= Outline of Belgium =

Country in Northwestern Europe

The flag of Belgium

The greater coat of arms of Belgium

The location of Belgium

Flag-map of Belgium

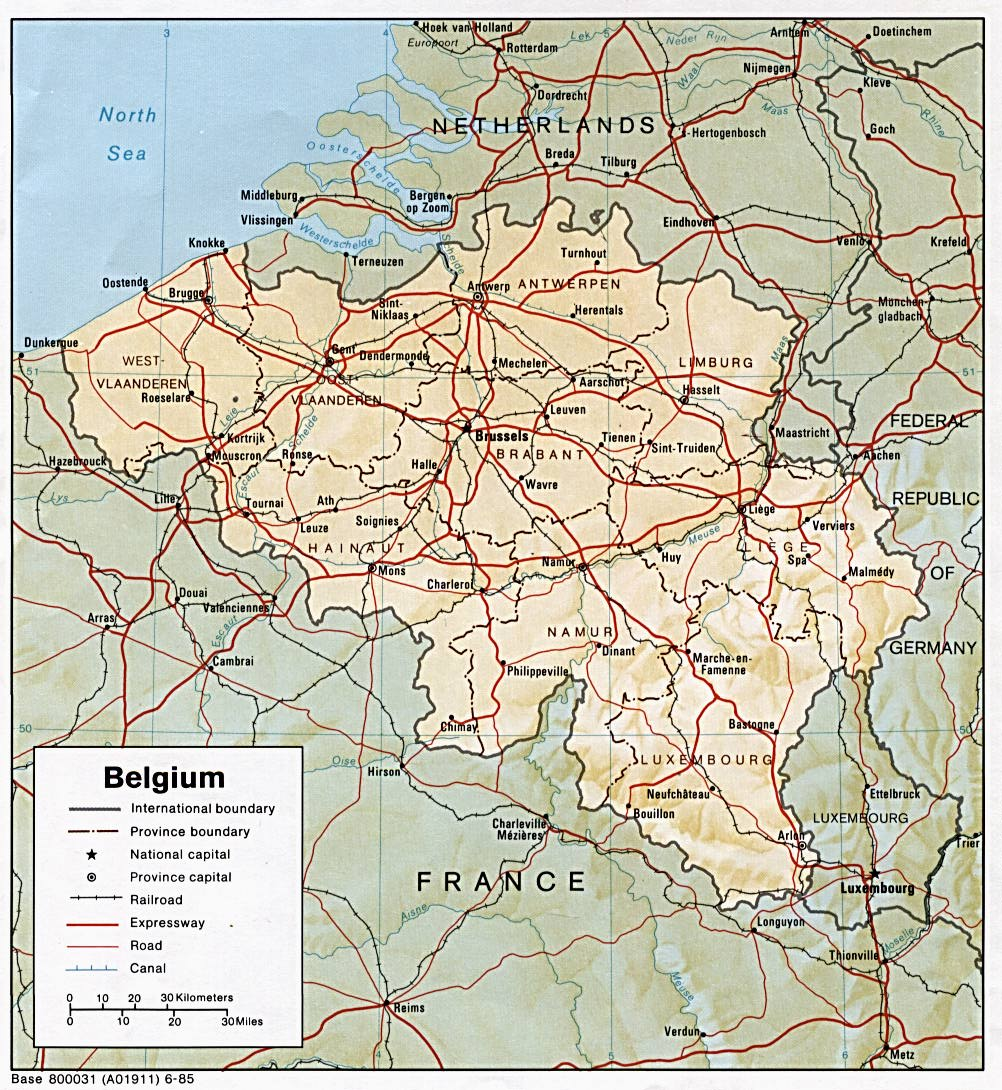
An enlargeable relief map of Belgium

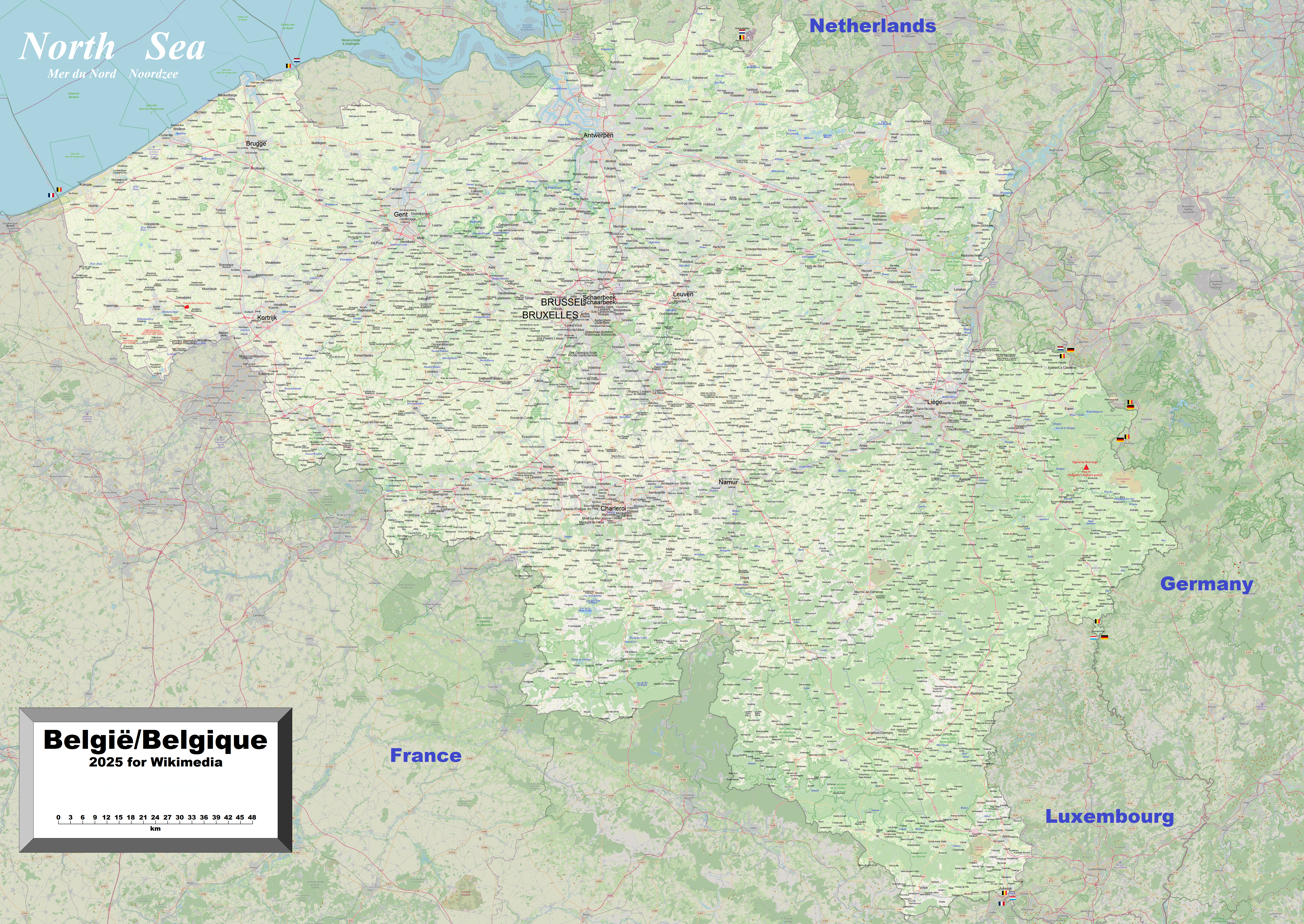
Map of Belgium's cities, towns and villages

The following outline is provided as an overview of and topical guide to Belgium:

Belgium – sovereign country located in northwest Europe. It is a founding member of the European Union and hosts its headquarters, as well as those of other major international organizations, including NATO, of which it is also a founding member. It is bordered by the Netherlands to the north, Germany and Luxembourg to the east, France to the south and southwest and the North Sea to the northwest. Brussels is its capital and largest city.

== General reference ==
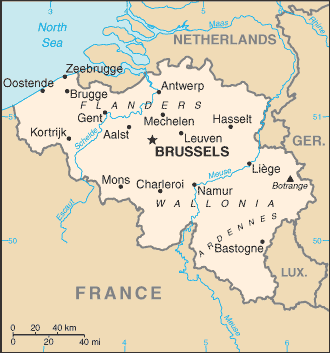
An enlargeable basic map of Belgium

- Pronunciation: /ˈbɛldʒəm/ BEL-jəm
- Common English country name: Belgium
- Official English country name: The Kingdom of Belgium
- Common endonym(s):
- Official endonym(s):
- Adjectival(s): Belgian
- Demonym(s): Belgians
- Etymology: Name of Belgium
- International rankings of Belgium
- ISO country codes: BE, BEL, 056
- ISO region codes: See ISO 3166-2:BE
- Internet country code top-level domain: .be

== Geography of Belgium ==
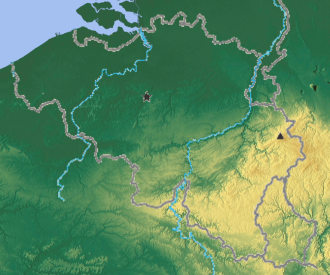
An enlargeable topographic map of Belgium

Geography of Belgium

- Belgium is a:
  - Country
    - Developed country
  - Nation state
    - Sovereign state
    - Member State of the European Union
    - Member state of NATO
- Location:
  - Northern Hemisphere and Eastern Hemisphere
  - Eurasia
    - Europe
      - Western Europe
  - Time zone: Central European Time (UTC+01), Central European Summer Time (UTC+02)
  - Extreme points of Belgium
    - High: Signal de Botrange 694 m (2,277 ft)
    - Low: North Sea 0 m
  - Land boundaries: 1,385 km

France 620 km
Netherlands 450 km
Germany 167 km
Luxembourg 148 km

- Coastline: 66.5 km

- Population of Belgium: 10,584,534(2007) - 82nd most populous country
- Area of Belgium: 30,528 square kilometres (11,787 sq mi) - 139th largest country
- Atlas of Belgium

=== Environment of Belgium ===
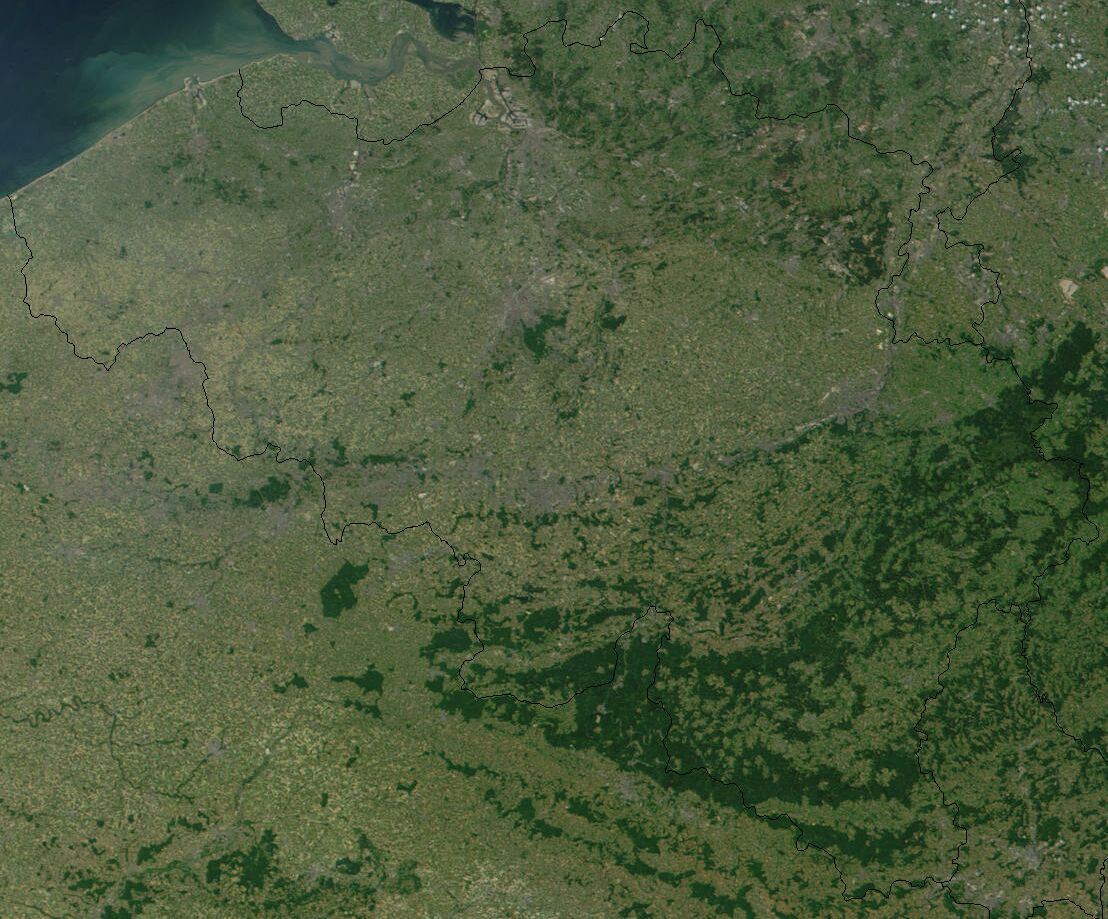
An enlargeable satellite image of Belgium

Environment of Belgium

- Climate of Belgium
- Renewable energy in Belgium
- Geology of Belgium
- Protected areas of Belgium
  - National parks of Belgium
- Wildlife of Belgium
  - Fauna of Belgium
    - Birds of Belgium
    - Mammals of Belgium

==== Natural geographic features of Belgium ====
- Lakes of Belgium
- Rivers of Belgium
- World Heritage Sites in Belgium

=== Regions of Belgium ===
==== Administrative divisions of Belgium ====
- Regions of Belgium
  - Provinces of Belgium
    - Arrondissements of Belgium
      - Municipalities of Belgium

Regions of Belgium

Flemish Region / Dutch language area Brussels-Capital Region / bilingual area Walloon Region / French and German language areas

Provinces of Belgium

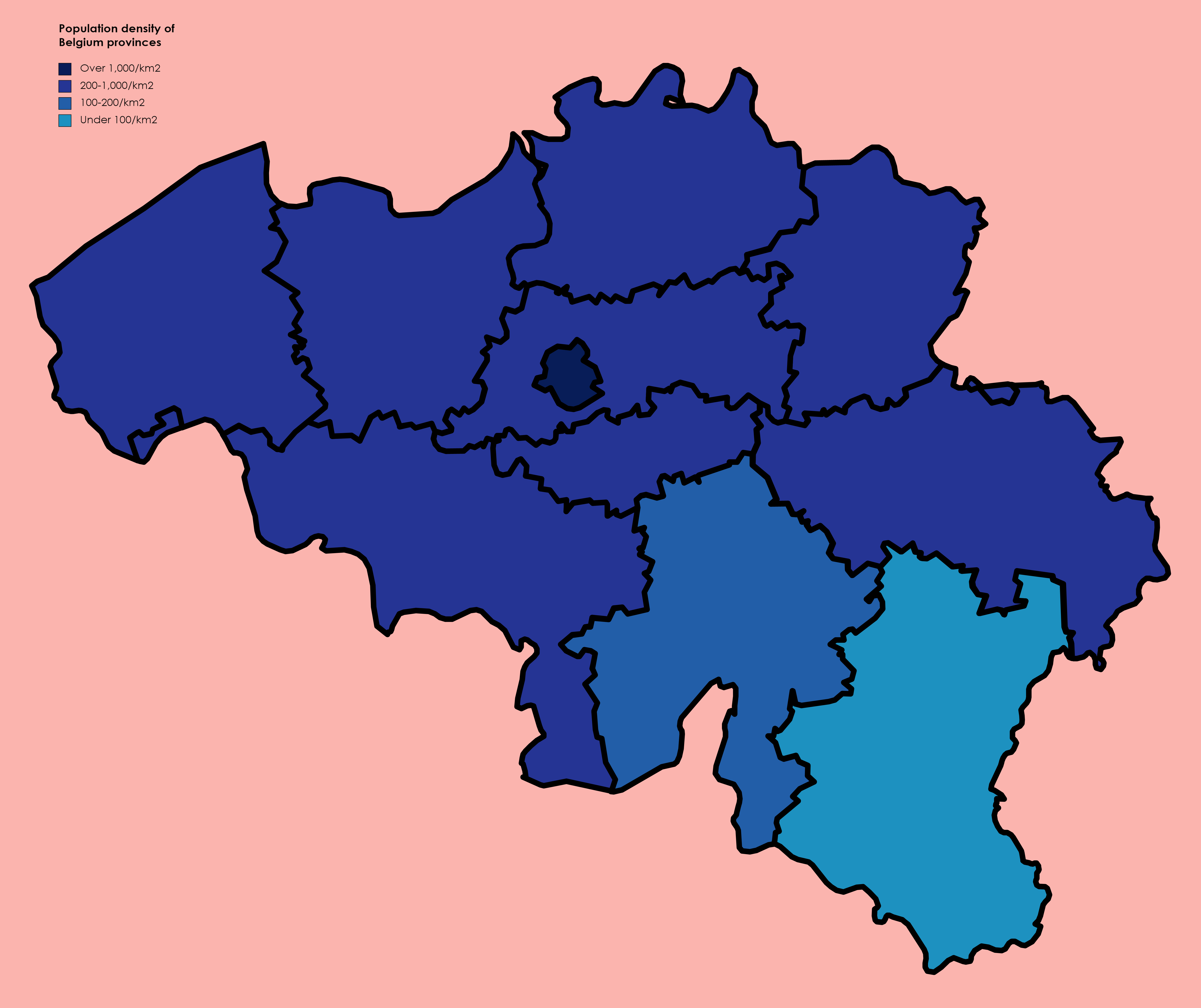
Provinces of Belgium (including the Brussels-Capital Region) by population density as of 1 January 2019

- Antwerp
- Limburg
- Flemish Brabant
- East Flanders
- West Flanders
- Hainaut
- Walloon Brabant
- Namur
- Liège
- Luxembourg

Municipalities of Belgium

- Capital of Belgium: Brussels
- Cities of Belgium

Belgium comprises 589 municipalities grouped into five provinces in each of two regions and into a third region, the Brussels-Capital Region, comprising 19 municipalities that do not belong to a province.

=== Demography of Belgium ===
Demographics of Belgium

== Government and politics of Belgium ==
Politics of Belgium

- Form of government: federal parliamentary representative democratic constitutional monarchy
- Capital of Belgium: Brussels
- Elections in Belgium
- Political parties in Belgium
- Political scandals of Belgium

=== Branches of government ===
Government of Belgium

==== Executive branch of the government of Belgium ====
- Head of state (ceremonial): King of the Belgians, Filip I
- Head of government: Prime Minister of Belgium, Bart De Wever
- Cabinet of Belgium

==== Legislative branch of the government of Belgium ====
- Belgian Federal Parliament (bicameral)
  - Upper house: Belgian Senate (Dutch: de Senaat, French: le Sénat, German: der Senat)
  - Lower house: Belgian Chamber of Representatives (Dutch: Kamer van Volksvertegenwoordigers, French: la Chambre des Représentants, German: die Abgeordnetenkammer)

==== Judicial branch of the government of Belgium ====
- Court of Cassation

=== Foreign relations of Belgium ===
Foreign relations of Belgium

- Diplomatic missions in Belgium
- Diplomatic missions of Belgium

==== International organization membership ====
The Kingdom of Belgium is a member of:

- African Development Bank Group (AfDB) (nonregional member)
- Asian Development Bank (ADB) (nonregional member)
- Australia Group
- Bank for International Settlements (BIS)
- Benelux Economic Union (Benelux)
- Confederation of European Paper Industries (CEPI)
- Council of Europe (CE)
- Economic and Monetary Union (EMU)
- Euro-Atlantic Partnership Council (EAPC)
- European Bank for Reconstruction and Development (EBRD)
- European Investment Bank (EIB)
- European Organization for Nuclear Research (CERN)
- European Space Agency (ESA)
- European Union (EU)
- Food and Agriculture Organization (FAO)
- Group of 9 (G9)
- Group of Ten (G10)
- Inter-American Development Bank (IADB)
- International Atomic Energy Agency (IAEA)
- International Bank for Reconstruction and Development (IBRD)
- International Chamber of Commerce (ICC)
- International Civil Aviation Organization (ICAO)
- International Criminal Court (ICCt)
- International Criminal Police Organization (Interpol)
- International Development Association (IDA)
- International Energy Agency (IEA)
- International Federation of Red Cross and Red Crescent Societies (IFRCS)
- International Finance Corporation (IFC)
- International Fund for Agricultural Development (IFAD)
- International Hydrographic Organization (IHO)
- International Labour Organization (ILO)
- International Maritime Organization (IMO)
- International Mobile Satellite Organization (IMSO)
- International Monetary Fund (IMF)
- International Olympic Committee (IOC)
- International Organization for Migration (IOM)
- International Organization for Standardization (ISO)
- International Red Cross and Red Crescent Movement (ICRM)
- International Telecommunication Union (ITU)
- International Telecommunications Satellite Organization (ITSO)
- International Trade Union Confederation (ITUC)
- Inter-Parliamentary Union (IPU)
- Multilateral Investment Guarantee Agency (MIGA)
- North Atlantic Treaty Organization (NATO)
- Nuclear Energy Agency (NEA)
- Nuclear Suppliers Group (NSG)
- Organisation internationale de la Francophonie (OIF)
- Organisation for Economic Co-operation and Development (OECD)
- Organization for Security and Cooperation in Europe (OSCE)
- Organisation for the Prohibition of Chemical Weapons (OPCW)
- Organization of American States (OAS) (observer)
- Paris Club
- Permanent Court of Arbitration (PCA)
- Schengen Convention
- Southeast European Cooperative Initiative (SECI) (observer)
- United Nations (UN)
- United Nations Conference on Trade and Development (UNCTAD)
- United Nations Educational, Scientific, and Cultural Organization (UNESCO)
- United Nations High Commissioner for Refugees (UNHCR)
- United Nations Industrial Development Organization (UNIDO)
- United Nations Interim Force in Lebanon (UNIFIL)
- United Nations Mission in the Sudan (UNMIS)
- United Nations Organization Mission in the Democratic Republic of the Congo (MONUC)
- United Nations Relief and Works Agency for Palestine Refugees in the Near East (UNRWA)
- United Nations Truce Supervision Organization (UNTSO)
- United Nations University (UNU)
- West African Development Bank (WADB) (nonregional)
- Western European Union (WEU)
- World Confederation of Labour (WCL)
- World Customs Organization (WCO)
- World Federation of Trade Unions (WFTU)
- World Health Organization (WHO)
- World Intellectual Property Organization (WIPO)
- World Meteorological Organization (WMO)
- World Trade Organization (WTO)
- Zangger Committee (ZC)

=== Law and order in Belgium ===
Law of Belgium

- Capital punishment in Belgium
- Constitution of Belgium
- Crime in Belgium
- Human rights in Belgium
  - LGBT rights in Belgium
  - Freedom of religion in Belgium
  - Voting rights in Belgium
  - Women in Belgium
  - Same-sex marriage in Belgium
- Law enforcement in Belgium

=== Military of Belgium ===
Military of Belgium

- Command
  - Commander-in-chief: Gerard Van Caelenberge
  - Defence minister: Theo Francken
    - Ministry of Defence of Belgium
- Forces
  - Army of Belgium
  - Navy of Belgium
  - Air Force of Belgium
  - Special forces of Belgium
  - Cyber Force of Belgium
- Military history of Belgium
- Military ranks of Belgium

=== Local government in Belgium ===
Local government in Belgium

== History of Belgium ==
History of Belgium

- Timeline of the history of Belgium
- Current events of Belgium
- Military history of Belgium

== Culture of Belgium ==
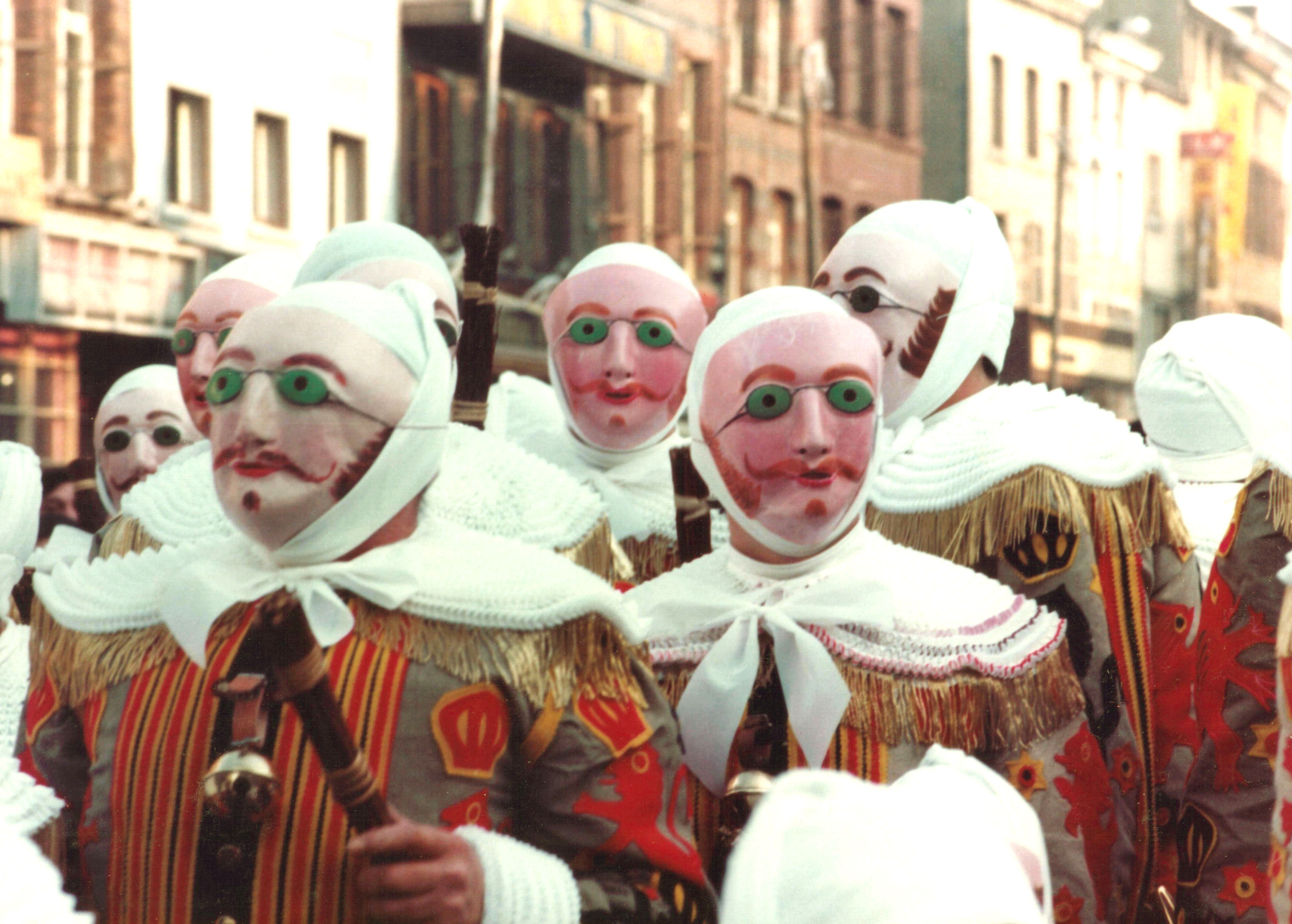
The Gilles of Binche, in costume, wearing wax masks

Culture of Belgium

- Architecture of Belgium
  - Neoclassical architecture in Belgium
- Cuisine of Belgium
- Languages of Belgium
- Media in Belgium
- National symbols of Belgium
  - Coat of arms of Belgium
  - Flag of Belgium
  - National anthem of Belgium
- People of Belgium
- Prostitution in Belgium
- Public holidays in Belgium
- Religion in Belgium
  - Buddhism in Belgium
  - Christianity in Belgium
  - Hinduism in Belgium
  - Islam in Belgium
  - Judaism in Belgium
  - Sikhism in Belgium
- World Heritage Sites in Belgium

=== Art in Belgium ===
- Art in Belgium
- Cinema of Belgium
- Literature of Belgium
- Music of Belgium
- Television in Belgium

=== Sports in Belgium ===
Sports in Belgium

- Football in Belgium
- Belgium at the Olympics

== Economy and infrastructure of Belgium ==
Economy of Belgium

- Economic rank, by nominal GDP (2007): 19th (nineteenth)
- Agriculture in Belgium
- Banking in Belgium
  - National Bank of Belgium
- Communications in Belgium
  - Internet in Belgium
- Companies of Belgium
- Currency of Belgium: Euro (see also Euro topics)
  - ISO 4217: EUR
- Energy in Belgium
  - Energy policy of Belgium
  - Oil industry in Belgium
- Health care in Belgium
- Mining in Belgium
- Belgium Stock Exchange
- Tourism in Belgium
- Transport in Belgium
  - Airports in Belgium
  - Rail transport in Belgium
  - Roads in Belgium
- Water supply and sanitation in Belgium

== Education in Belgium ==
Education in Belgium

- Open access in Belgium
- Academic grading in Belgium
- List of universities in Belgium

== See also ==
- List of Belgium-related topics
- List of international rankings
- Member state of the European Union
- Member state of the North Atlantic Treaty Organization
- Member state of the United Nations
- Outline of Europe
- Outline of geography
