= Fauna of Belgium =

Native animals of Belgium

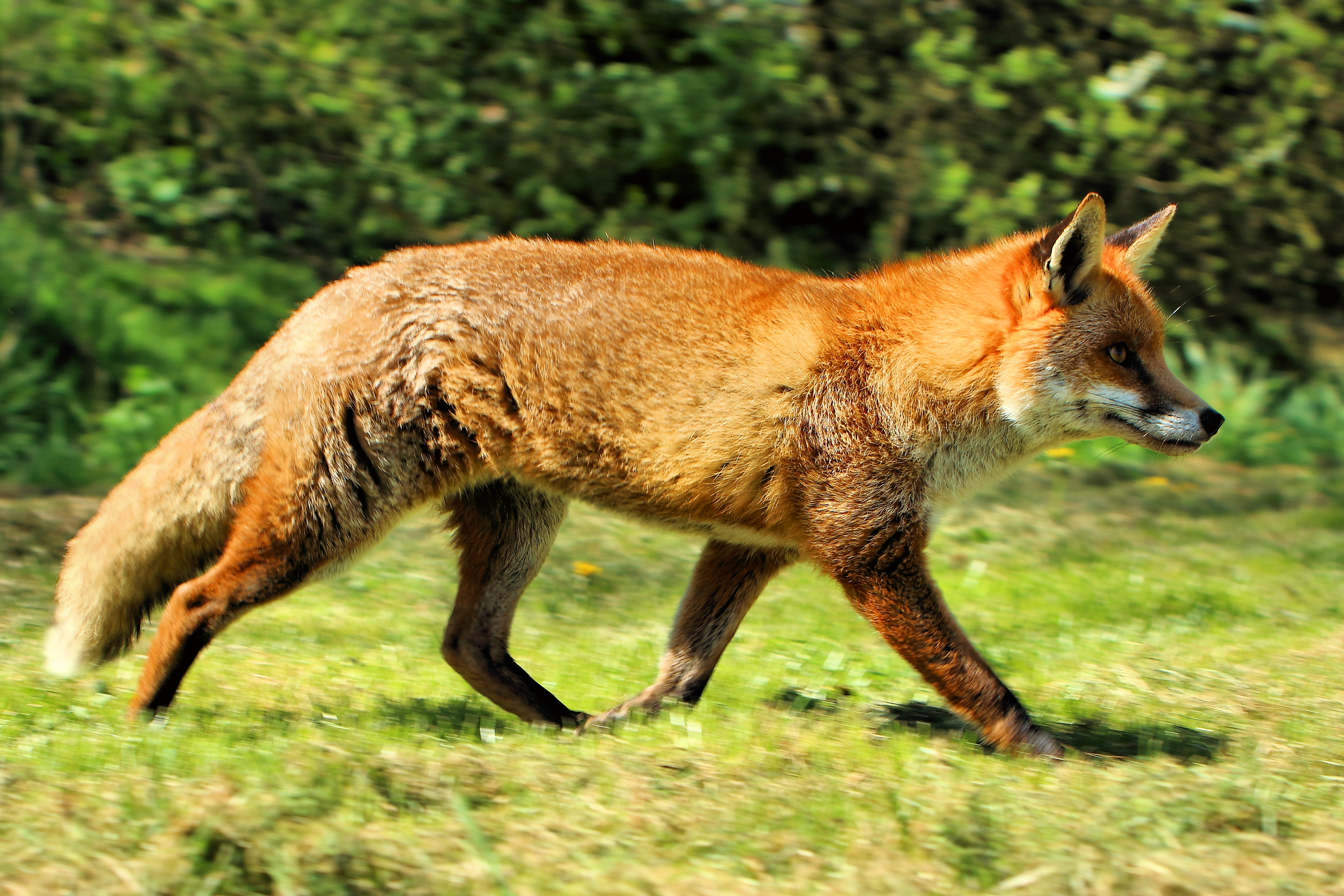
Red fox

Belgium is divided into distinct geographical regions with slightly different types of fauna.

== Birds ==
Belgium is home to over 400 species of birds. The wetlands in the High Fens have many species of migratory birds. The North Sea area itself has around 60 seabird species.

== Mammals ==
Belgium is home to at least 73 species of mammals. In 2024 2.4% of these were classified as threatened.

The forests of the Ardennes region contain red deer, European badgers, Eurasian beavers, and others.

== Marine fauna ==
The North Sea region of Belgium has a wide variety of fauna, with 140-150 different fish and many harbour porpoises and seals.

== See also ==
- Outline of Belgium

== Sources ==
Geography of Belgium

List of birds of Belgium

List of mammals of Belgium

bch-CBD.naturalsciences.be
