= 1983 Liège earthquake =

Uncommon earthquake near Liège, Belgium

- Location within Belgium
- UTC time: 1983-11-08 00:49:32
- ISC event: 564506
- USGS-ANSS: ComCat
- Local date: 8 November 1983
- Local time: 01:49:32 CET
- Magnitude: 4.7 mb
- Depth: 14 km (9 mi)
- Epicenter: 50.696°N 5.346°E
- Areas affected: Belgium; Netherlands
- Total damage: €42 Million – €75 Million
- Max. intensity: MMI VIII (Severe); MSK-64 VIII (Damaging)
- Peak acceleration: 0.13–0.20 g
- Aftershocks: +10 aftershocks, the largest being a M_{L}3.4
- Casualties: 2 fatalities, 30 injuries

The 1983 Liège earthquake occurred on 8 November 1983 at 01:49 Central European Time, with an epicenter near Remicourt in Liège Province, Belgium. It had a body wave magnitude of 4.7, with a depth of around 14 km. A Modified Mercalli Intensity of VIII (severe) was observed. The event was followed by more than 10 aftershocks. 2 people died, 30 were injured and over 16,000 buildings were damaged. The cost of damages have been estimated at between 42 million and 75 million euros. It is the biggest earthquake to have ever occurred in Belgium since the 1938 Zulzeke earthquake.

== Geological setting ==
The region of Liège is tectonically situated on the southeastern corner of the Brabant Parautochthon and northeastern side of the Ardenne Allochthon, which are being seperared by the Midi-Eifelian Fault, a segment of the Variscan front thrust. The origins of the fault can be traced back to the Variscan orogeny, a late Paleozoic mountain formation process.

== Earthquake ==
The earthquake struck on 8 November at Remicourt northwest of Liège. It was the largest to have struck Belgium since the 1938 Zulzeke earthquake. It was widely felt in Belgium and neighboring countries including the Netherlands, Germany and Luxembourg. A maximum intensity of VIII (severe) was observed. More than 10 aftershocks were recorded, the largest was recorded at M_{L} 3.4.

The event occurred on the Midi-Eifellian fault, which is a right-lateral strike-slip fault, with a focal depth of 14 km. The estimated peak ground acceleration near the epicenter was between 0.13 and 0.20 g.

== Impact ==
The total cost of damages as a result of the earthquake ranged from €42 million to €75 million. Two individuals lost their lives, one after a ceiling of a bedroom collapsed and another due to a heart attack, along with 30 reported injuries. More than 16,000 structures received damage, including chimneys, roofs and walls. Over 700 families were relocated.

== Response ==
A few weeks after the earthquake, the Belgian government decided to reimburse part of the repair costs and invited the owners from the most affected localities to report the damage on their properties.

== See also ==
- 1692 Northwestern Europe earthquake
- List of earthquakes in 1983
- Geology of Belgium
