= Coat of arms of the German-speaking Community of Belgium =

Coat of arms

- Armiger: German-speaking Community of Belgium
- Adopted: 15 November 1990
- Shield: In Silber ein roter Löwe begleitet von neun blauen Fünfblättern, von einer Königskrone überhöht.

The coat of arms that serves as the symbol of the German-speaking Community of Belgium, a federal community in Belgium, was adopted in 1990.

== History ==
In 1989, there was a call for proposals for a flag and coat of arms of the German-speaking Community of Belgium. The decree establishing the symbols was adopted on 1 October 1990 and published on 15 November 1990.

== Design ==
The coat of arms of the German-speaking Community of Belgium is blazoned as In Silber ein roter Löwe begleitet von neun blauen Fünfblättern, von einer Königskrone überhöht, which is to say Argent, a lion Gules surrounded by nine cinquefoils Azure, surmounted by a royal crown.

The red lion alludes to the coat of arms of the Duchy of Luxemburg and the historical Duchy of Limburg, and symbolizes the historical affiliation of the German-speaking community to those states. The nine gentiana flowers represent the nine municipalities of the German-speaking community. Gentiana flowers grow in High Fens, an upland area and a nature reserve in the region. The crown further shows the allegiance of the German-speaking community of Belgium to the Kingdom of Belgium itself.

== See also ==
- Flag of the German-speaking Community of Belgium
- National symbols of Belgium
- Belgian heraldry
- German heraldry
