= Plain of Flanders =

Plain near the North Sea

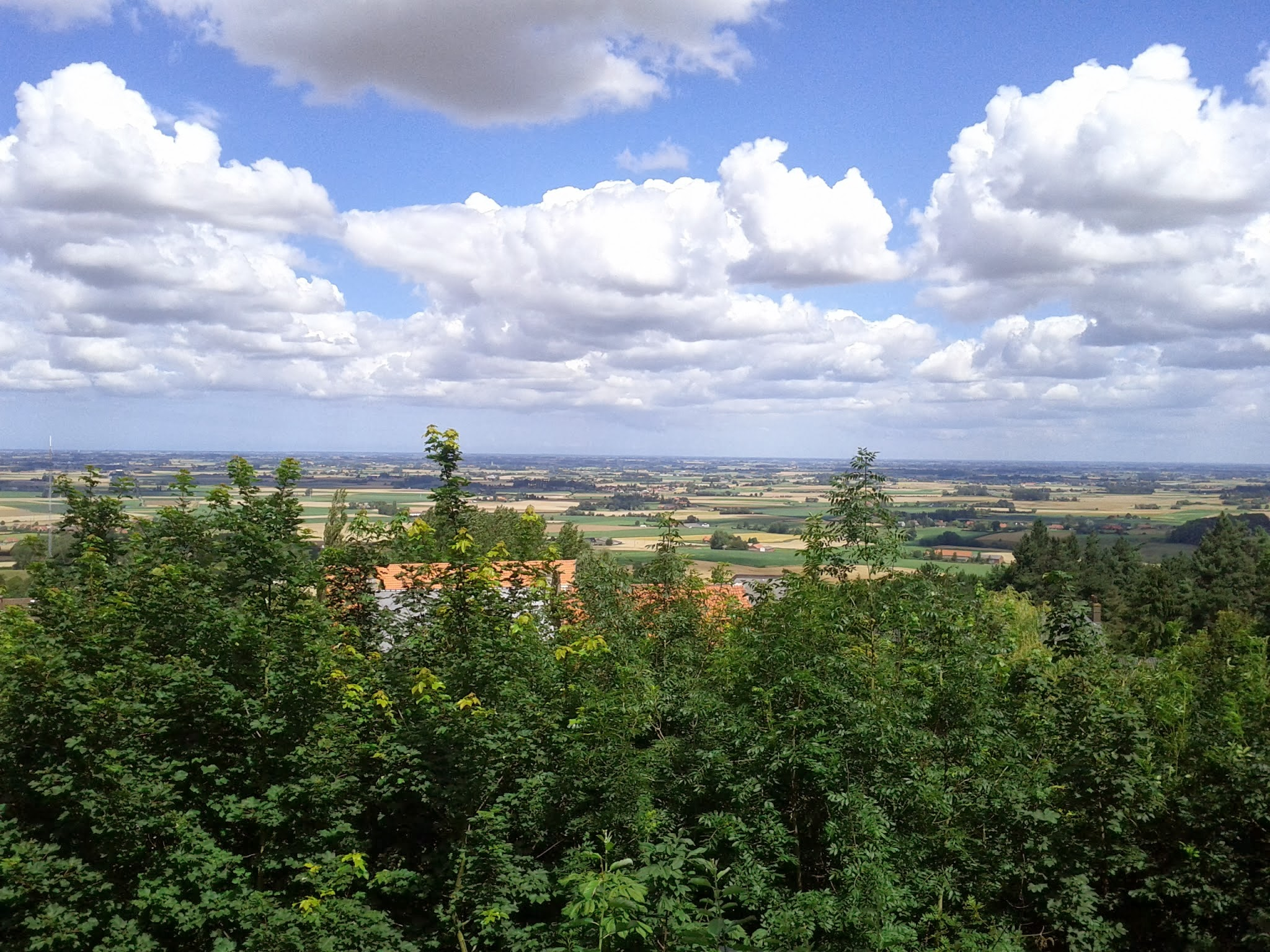
Western part of Plaine de Flandre, as viewed from Mount Cassel.

The Plain of Flanders (fr: Plaine de Flandre or plaine flamande) is a low-lying plain bordering the North Sea. It is part of the Low Countries, and the North European Plain. It extends through the territories of Northern France and Belgium. It has two main sections: Maritime Flanders and Interior Flanders. The coastal plain consists mainly of sand dunes and polders.

It is a feature of the Flanders Basin (fr: Bassin de Flandre), which is separated from the Parisian Basin by the Hills of Artois.

It is a formation dating the Cenozoic era.

Maritime Flanders also refers to the French Westhoek region. It refers more specifically to the Blootland (Dutch for "naked land") or the Maritime Plain (French: Plaine maritime) including Dunkirk, Bourbourg, Bergues and Hondschoote.

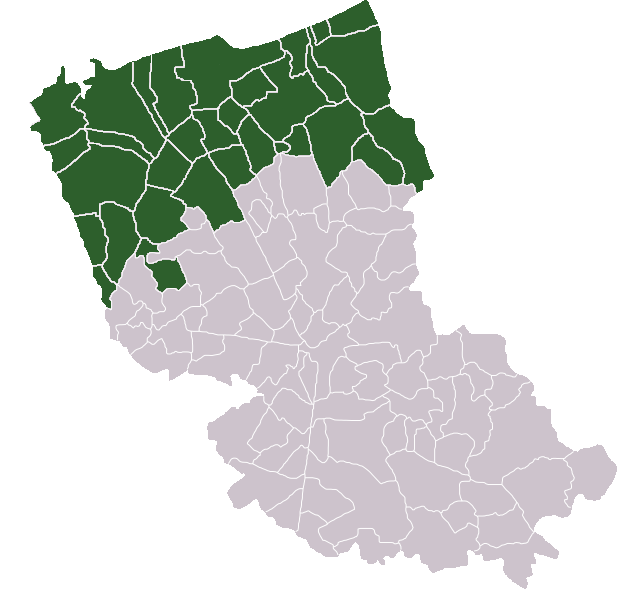
Blootland

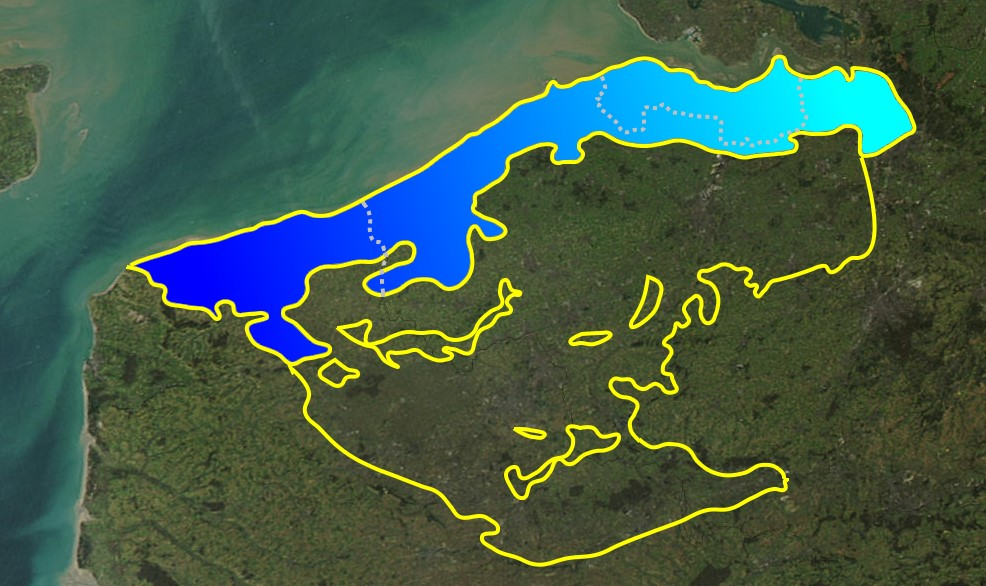
Map of plaine de Flandre

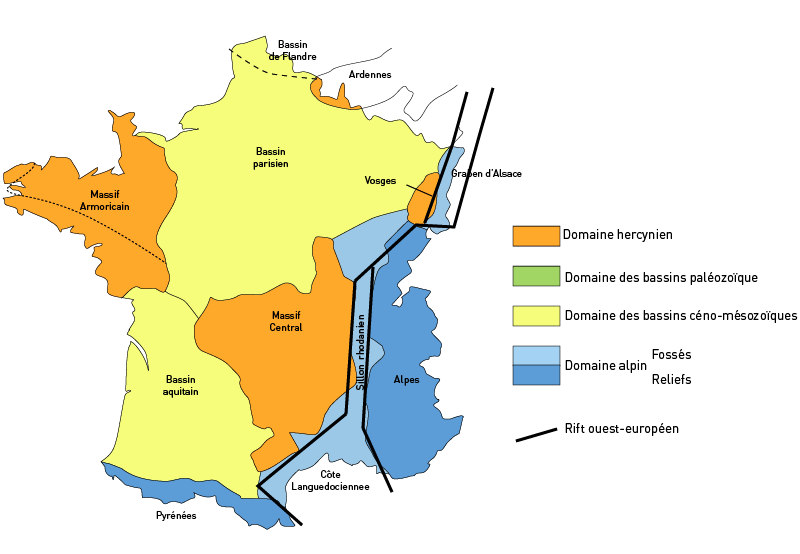
Geological domains of France

== See also ==
- Flanders
- Geography of Belgium
