= Rouvroy, Belgium =

Municipality in Wallonia, Belgium

Rouvroy Rouvrou (Gaumais)
- Municipality
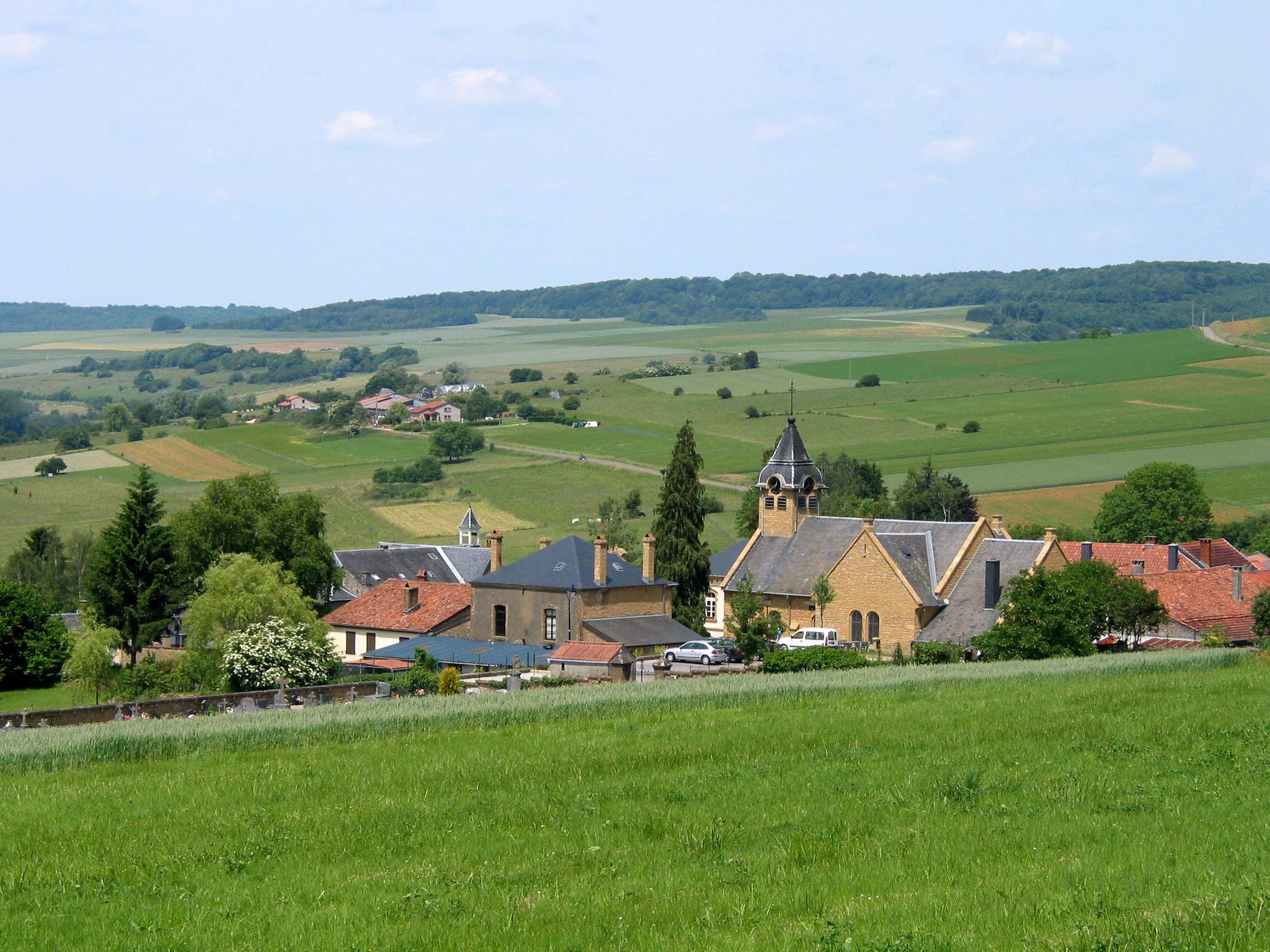
- Torgny, southernmost place in Belgium

- Flag Coat of arms

- Location of Rouvroy in Luxembourg province
- Interactive map of Rouvroy
- Location in Belgium
- Coordinates: 49°32.3′N 5°29.45′E
- Country: Belgium
- Community: French Community
- Region: Wallonia
- Province: Luxembourg
- Arrondissement: Virton

Government
  - Mayor: Carmen Ramlot
  - Governing party: GO

Area
  - Total: 28.1 km^{2} (10.8 sq mi)

Population (2018-01-01)
  - Total: 2,082
  - Density: 74.1/km^{2} (192/sq mi)
- Postal codes: 6767
- NIS code: 85047
- Area codes: 063
- Website: (in French) rouvroy.be

Rouvroy (French pronunciation: [ʁuvʁwa]; Gaumais : Rouvrou; Walloon: Rovroe-e-Gåme) is a municipality of Wallonia located in the province of Luxembourg, Belgium.

On 1 January 2007 the municipality, which covers 27.68 km^{2}, had 2,007 inhabitants, giving a population density of 72.5 inhabitants per km^{2}. Wallonia and Belgium's southernmost point is situated in the municipality, at Torgny.

Formed in 1976, the municipality consists of the following district: Dampicourt, Harnoncourt, Lamorteau, Rouvroy, and Torgny. Other population centers include Couvreux and Montquintin.

== See also ==
- List of protected heritage sites in Rouvroy, Belgium
