= Flag of the German-speaking Community of Belgium =

German-speaking Community of Belgium
- 2:3 version
- Proportion: 2:3 (de facto); 1:1 or 13:15 (de jure)
- Adopted: 25 November 1990
- Design: White with a red lion surrounded by nine gentiana flowers.

The flag of the German-speaking Community of Belgium has a form of a white banner of arms depicting with a red lion surrounded by nine flowers. It was adopted on 25 November 1990.

== Design ==
The flag of the German-speaking Community of Belgium is a banner of arms of coat of arms of the region. It consists of the white background. In the centre is placed a red lion standing on its back legs with raised front paws and its tongue out. Around it are placed in a circle nine gentiana flowers that have five intense blue petals and white (silver) round centres. According to a drawing attached to the establishing decree prescribing the flag, it should be square with proportions 1:1 or 13:15, but it is always used with 2:3 proportions instead.

The red lion alludes to the coat of arms of the Duchy of Luxemburg and the historical Duchy of Limburg, and symbolizes the historical affiliation of the German-speaking community to those states. The nine gentiana flowers represent the nine municipalities of the German-speaking community. Gentiana flowers grow in High Fens, an upland area and a nature reserve in the region.

== History ==
In 1989, there was a call for proposals for a flag and coat of arms of the German-speaking Community of Belgium. The decree establishing the symbols was adopted on 1 October 1990 and published on 15 November 1990.

== See also ==
- Coat of arms of the German-speaking Community of Belgium
- National symbols of Belgium
- Flags of Belgium
