= Geography of Belgium =

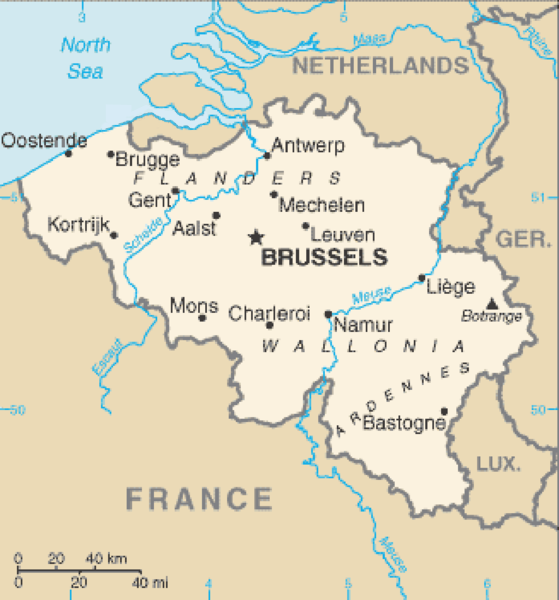
- Continent: Europe
- Region: Western Europe
- Coordinates: 50°50′N 4°00′E
- Area: Ranked 136th
  - Total: 30,689 km^{2} (11,849 sq mi)
  - Land: 99.36%
  - Water: 0.64%
- Coastline: 66.5 km (41.3 mi)
- Borders: Total land borders: 1,380/1,385 km
- Highest point: Signal de Botrange; 695 m (2,280 ft)
- Lowest point: De Moeren −3 m (−10 ft)
- Longest river: Escaut; 200 km

Belgium is a federal state located in Western Europe and is divided into three regions: the Flemish Region (Flanders), the Walloon Region (Wallonia), and the Brussels Capital Region (Brussels).

Belgium borders the North Sea and shares borders with the countries of France (620 km), the Netherlands (450 km), Germany (162/167 km) and Luxembourg (148 km).

== General information ==
Total renewable water resources: 20 cu km (2013)

Freshwater withdrawal (domestic/industrial/agricultural):
total: 6.22 cu km/yr (12%/88%/1%)
per capita: 589.8 cu m/yr (2007)

Natural hazards: flooding is a threat in areas of reclaimed coastal land, protected from the sea by concrete dikes

Geography – note: crossroads of Western Europe; majority of West European capitals within 1,000 km of Brussels which is the seat of both the EU and NATO

Longest Distances: 280 km SE-NW/ 222 km NE-SW

== Area ==
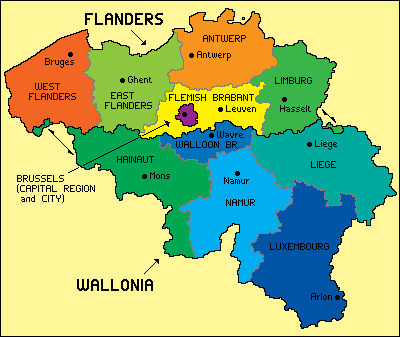
Map of Belgian regions and provinces.

Belgium has an area of 30,689 km² (11,849 sq mi), with 16,901 km^{2} (6,526 sq mi) or 55.1% for the Walloon Region, 13,626 km^{2} (5,261 sq mi) or 44.4% for the Flemish Region, and 162 km^{2} (63 sq mi) or 0.5% for the Brussels Capital Region.

Its land area is 30,494 km² (11,774 sq mi) or 99.36%, and its water area is 195 km² (75 sq mi) or 0.64%. Belgium has also 3,454 km² (1,334 sq mi) of sea territories in the North Sea; including this, its total territory is 34,143 km² (13,183 sq mi).

By provinces, the area (of 30,689 km²) is distributed as such:

- Luxembourg: 4,459 km^{2} (1,722 sq mi)
- Liège: 3,857 km^{2} (1,489 sq mi)
- Hainaut: 3,813 km^{2} (1,472 sq mi)
- Namur: 3,675 km^{2} (1,419 sq mi)
- West Flanders: 3,197 km^{2} (1,234 sq mi)
- East Flanders: 3,007 km^{2} (1,161 sq mi)
- Antwerp: 2,876 km^{2} (1,110 sq mi)
- Limburg: 2,427 km^{2} (937 sq mi)
- Flemish Brabant: 2,118 km^{2} (818 sq mi)
- Walloon Brabant: 1,097 km^{2} (424 sq mi)

For the purpose of total area, the Brussels-Capital Region should also be included, though no longer a province since the Brabant was split.

On 29 May 2000, 2,000 square meters were granted by the Netherlands to Belgium (a piece of land in Zelzate along the Ghent–Terneuzen Canal).

Compared to other countries, Belgium is 44% larger than Wales in the United Kingdom and about the size of Maryland in the United States. Belgium is actually used as an unusual unit of measurement in comparing country sizes.

In November 2016, Belgium and the Netherlands agreed to cede small, uninhabited parcels of land to reflect a change in course of the river Meuse (or Maas, in Dutch). The land swap is to take effect as of 2018.

== Physical geography ==
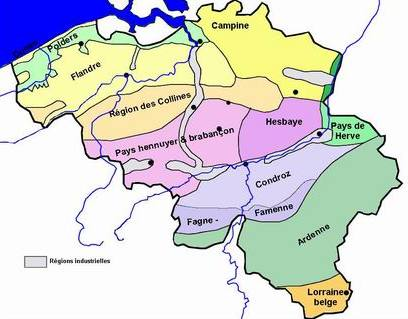
The natural regions of Belgium.

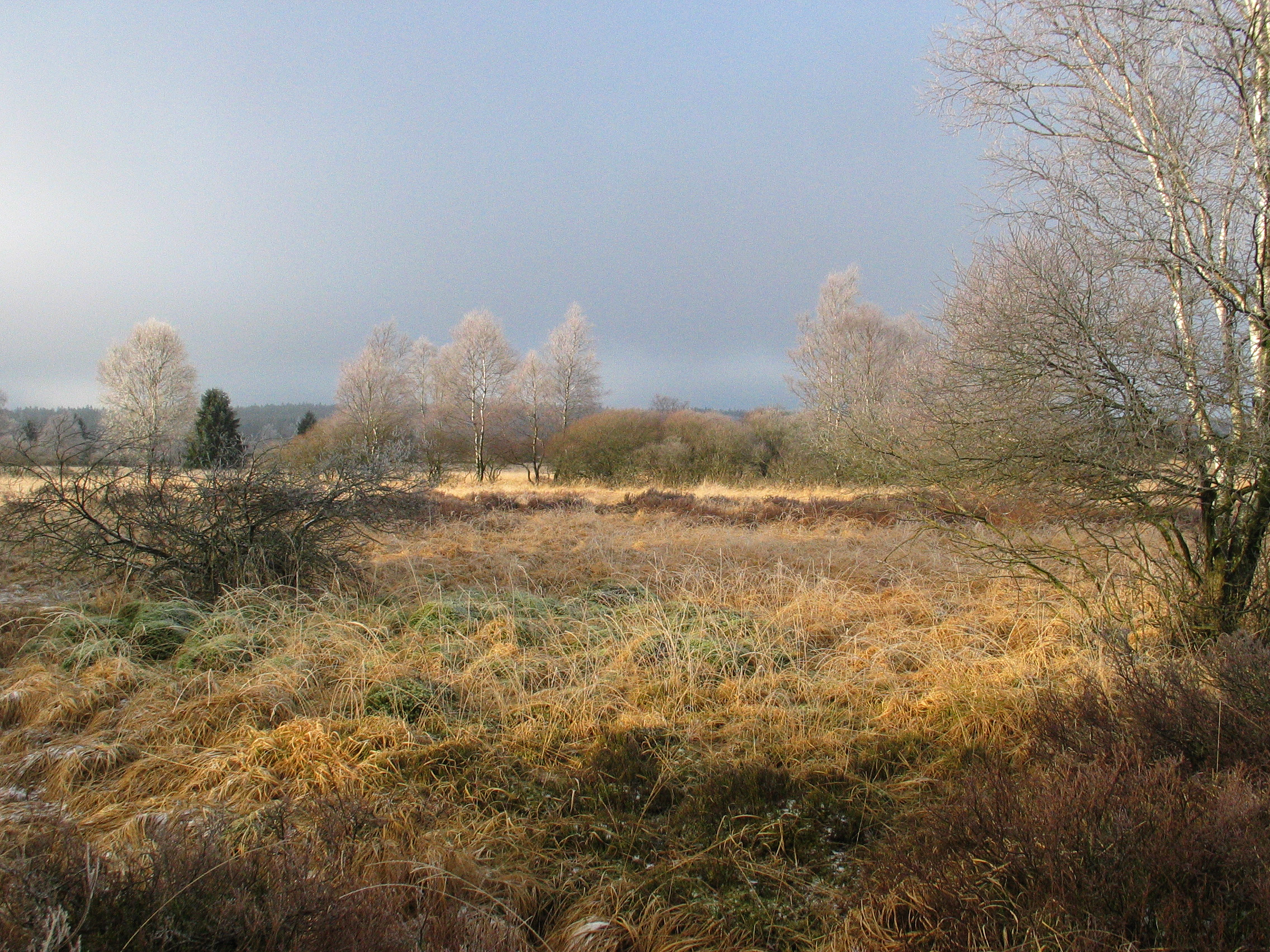
Landscape in the Hautes Fagnes, in the Ardennes

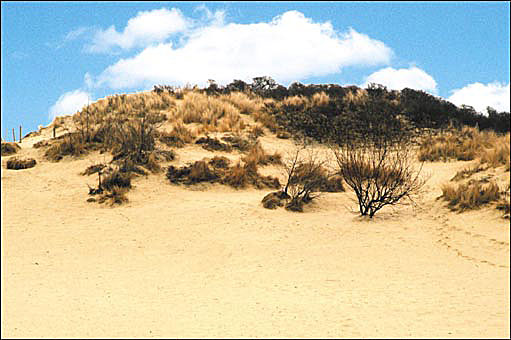
Dunes in Koksijde, at the North Sea

Belgium has three main geographical regions: the coastal plain in the north-west, the central plateau, and the Ardennes uplands in the south-east. The coastal plain consists mainly of sand dunes and polders. Polders are areas of land, close to or below sea level that have been reclaimed from the sea, from which they are protected by dikes or, further inland, by fields that have been drained with canals. The second geographical region, the central plateau, lies further inland. This is a smooth, slowly rising area that has many fertile valleys and is irrigated by many waterways. Here one can also find rougher land, including caves and small gorges. The third geographical region, called the Ardennes, is more rugged than the first two. It is a thickly forested plateau, very rocky and not very good for farming, which extends into northern France and in Germany where it is named Eifel. This is where much of Belgium's wildlife can be found. Belgium's highest point, the Signal de Botrange is located in this region at only 694 metres (2,277 ft). Belgium has relatively few natural lakes and none of any great size.

Notable natural regions include the Ardennes, Campine and High Fens.

=== Rivers and lakes ===
All of Belgium is drained into the North Sea, except the municipality of Momignies (Macquenoise), which is drained by the river Oise into the English Channel. Three major rivers flow into the sea: the Scheldt (200 km in Belgium, 350 km in total), the Meuse (183 km in Belgium, 925 km in total) and the Yser (50 km in Belgium, 78 km in total). Other rivers are the Rupel, Senne, Sambre, Lesse, Ourthe, Lys and Dijle. The main lakes include the Lake Genval, Lake Bütgenbach, Lake Eau d'Heure, Lake Gileppe, Lake Eupen and Lake Robertville.

=== Artificial waterways ===
Belgium also has many artificial waterways or canals, among others the Brussels–Scheldt Maritime Canal, the Brussels–Charleroi Canal, the Canal du Centre and the Albert Canal in Antwerp.

=== Climate ===
The Belgian climate, like most of northwest Europe, is maritime temperate, with significant precipitation in all seasons (Köppen climate classification: Cfb; the average temperature is 3 °C (37.4 °F) in January, and 18 °C (64.4 °F) in July; the average precipitation is 65 mm (2.6 in) in January, and 78 mm (3.1 in) in July). Belgium usually has cool winters but temperatures as low as −16 °C (3 °F) have been registered and summers are comfortably warm but temperatures can occasionally rise as high as 30 °C (86 °F).

Climate data for Uccle (Brussels-Capital Region) 1991–2020
Month	Jan	Feb	Mar	Apr	May	Jun	Jul	Aug	Sep	Oct	Nov	Dec	Year
Record high °C (°F)	15.3 (59.5)	20.0 (68.0)	24.2 (75.6)	28.7 (83.7)	34.1 (93.4)	38.8 (101.8)	39.7 (103.5)	36.5 (97.7)	34.9 (94.8)	27.8 (82.0)	20.6 (69.1)	16.7 (62.1)	39.7 (103.5)
Mean daily maximum °C (°F)	6.1 (43.0)	7.1 (44.8)	10.9 (51.6)	15.0 (59.0)	18.4 (65.1)	21.2 (70.2)	23.2 (73.8)	23.0 (73.4)	19.5 (67.1)	14.9 (58.8)	9.9 (49.8)	6.6 (43.9)	14.7 (58.4)
Daily mean °C (°F)	3.7 (38.7)	4.2 (39.6)	7.1 (44.8)	10.4 (50.7)	13.9 (57.0)	16.7 (62.1)	18.7 (65.7)	18.4 (65.1)	15.2 (59.4)	11.3 (52.3)	7.2 (45.0)	4.3 (39.7)	10.9 (51.7)
Mean daily minimum °C (°F)	1.4 (34.5)	1.5 (34.7)	3.5 (38.3)	6.0 (42.8)	9.2 (48.6)	12.0 (53.6)	14.1 (57.4)	13.9 (57.0)	11.3 (52.3)	8.1 (46.6)	4.6 (40.3)	2.1 (35.8)	7.3 (45.2)
Record low °C (°F)	−21.1 (−6.0)	−18.3 (−0.9)	−13.6 (7.5)	−5.7 (21.7)	−2.2 (28.0)	0.3 (32.5)	4.4 (39.9)	3.9 (39.0)	0.0 (32.0)	−6.8 (19.8)	−12.8 (9.0)	−17.7 (0.1)	−21.1 (−6.0)
Average precipitation mm (inches)	75.5 (2.97)	65.1 (2.56)	59.3 (2.33)	46.7 (1.84)	59.7 (2.35)	70.8 (2.79)	76.9 (3.03)	86.5 (3.41)	65.3 (2.57)	67.8 (2.67)	76.2 (3.00)	87.4 (3.44)	837.2 (32.96)
Average precipitation days (≥ 0.1 mm)	18.9	16.9	15.7	13.1	14.7	14.1	14.3	14.3	14.1	16.1	18.3	19.4	189.9
Average snowy days	3.8	4.9	2.7	0.6	0.0	0.0	0.0	0.0	0.0	0.1	1.2	3.7	17
Average relative humidity (%)	84.1	80.6	74.8	69.2	70.2	71.3	71.5	72.4	76.8	81.5	85.1	86.6	77.0
Mean monthly sunshine hours	59.1	72.9	125.8	171.3	198.3	199.3	203.2	192.4	154.4	112.6	65.8	48.6	1,603.7
Average ultraviolet index	1	1	3	4	6	7	6	6	4	2	1	1	4
Source 1: Royal Meteorological Institute
Source 2: Weather Atlas; 2019 July record high from VRT Nieuws

Climate data for Antwerp (1981–2010 normals), sunshine 1984–2013
Month	Jan	Feb	Mar	Apr	May	Jun	Jul	Aug	Sep	Oct	Nov	Dec	Year
Mean daily maximum °C (°F)	6.2 (43.2)	7.0 (44.6)	10.8 (51.4)	14.4 (57.9)	18.4 (65.1)	20.9 (69.6)	23.2 (73.8)	23.1 (73.6)	19.7 (67.5)	15.3 (59.5)	10.1 (50.2)	6.6 (43.9)	14.7 (58.5)
Daily mean °C (°F)	3.4 (38.1)	3.7 (38.7)	6.8 (44.2)	9.6 (49.3)	13.6 (56.5)	16.2 (61.2)	18.5 (65.3)	18.2 (64.8)	15.1 (59.2)	11.3 (52.3)	7.0 (44.6)	4.0 (39.2)	10.6 (51.1)
Mean daily minimum °C (°F)	0.7 (33.3)	0.5 (32.9)	2.8 (37.0)	4.8 (40.6)	8.8 (47.8)	11.7 (53.1)	13.8 (56.8)	13.2 (55.8)	10.6 (51.1)	7.4 (45.3)	4.1 (39.4)	1.5 (34.7)	6.7 (44.1)
Average precipitation mm (inches)	69.3 (2.73)	57.4 (2.26)	63.8 (2.51)	47.1 (1.85)	61.5 (2.42)	77.0 (3.03)	80.6 (3.17)	77.3 (3.04)	77.2 (3.04)	78.7 (3.10)	79.0 (3.11)	79.5 (3.13)	848.4 (33.40)
Average precipitation days (≥ 1.0 mm)	12.3	10.6	12.0	9.2	10.6	10.4	10.2	9.9	10.3	11.4	12.9	12.8	132.7
Mean monthly sunshine hours	57	77	122	177	208	202	214	202	144	116	62	47	1,625
Source: Royal Meteorological Institute

=== Mountain and hills ===
Belgium's highest point is the Signal de Botrange at 694 metres above the sea level. Other hills in Belgium include the Kemmelberg (159 m high) and the Koppenberg (77 m high) both known as part of the route of the cycle races Gent–Wevelgem and the Tour of Flanders respectively.

=== Extreme points ===
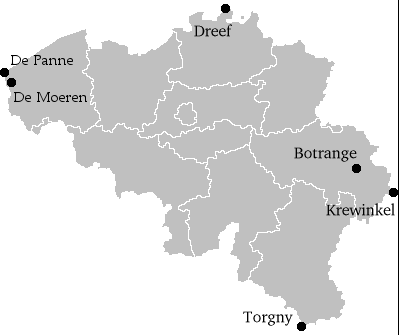
Extreme points of Belgium

This is a list of the extreme points of Belgium, the points that are farther north, south, east, west, high or low than any other location.

- Northernmost point — Dreef, municipality of Hoogstraten, Antwerp Province
- Southernmost point — Torgny, municipality of Rouvroy, Luxembourg
- Westernmost point — De Panne, West Flanders (also the northernmost point in France)
- Easternmost point — Krewinkel, municipality of Büllingen, Liège Province
- Highest point — Signal de Botrange (694 m)
- Lowest point — De Moeren (−3 m)

The Belgian National Geographic Institute calculated that the central point of Belgium lies at coordinates 50°38′28″N 4°40′05″E, in Nil-Saint-Vincent-Saint-Martin in the municipality of Walhain.

== Natural resources ==
Natural resources in Belgium include construction materials, silica sand and carbonates. Belgium used to have coal mines. As of 2012, the land use was as follows:

- Arable land: 26.49%
- Permanent crops: 0.79%
- Other: 72.72%

As of 2007, the estimated area of irrigated land was of 233.5 km^{2}.

== Environment ==
Because of its high population density and location in the centre of Western Europe, Belgium faces serious environmental problems. A 2003 report suggested that the water in Belgium's rivers was of the lowest quality in Europe, and bottom of the 122 countries studied. The environment is exposed to intense pressures from human activities: urbanisation, dense transportation network, industry, extensive animal breeding, and crop cultivation; air and water pollution also have repercussions for neighbouring countries; uncertainties regarding federal and regional responsibilities (now resolved) have slowed progress in tackling environmental challenges.

In Belgium forest cover is around 23% of the total land area, equivalent to 689,300 hectares (ha) of forest in 2020, up from 677,400 hectares (ha) in 1990. In 2020, naturally regenerating forest covered 251,200 hectares (ha) and planted forest covered 438,200 hectares (ha). For the year 2015, 47% of the forest area was reported to be under public ownership, 53% private ownership and 0% with ownership listed as other or unknown.

== Cities ==
The main cities in Belgium in terms of population are Brussels, Antwerp, Ghent, Charleroi and Liège. Other notable cities include Bruges, Namur, Leuven, Mons and Mechelen.
