= List of protected heritage sites in Rouvroy, Belgium =

This table shows an overview of the protected heritage sites in the Walloon town Rouvroy, Belgium. This list is part of Belgium's national heritage.

Object	Year/architect	Town/section	Address	Coordinates	Number^{?}	Image
Church of Saint-Quentin ^{(nl)} ^{(fr)}		Rouvroy	Montquintin	49.544904°N 5.473813°E	85047-CLT-0002-01 Info	Kerk Saint-Quentin More images
Ruins of castle Dampicourt ^{(nl)} ^{(fr)}		Rouvroy		49.545587°N 5.472679°E	85047-CLT-0003-01 Info	Ruines van kasteel Dampicourt More images
Entire site of Montquintin ^{(nl)} ^{(fr)}		Rouvroy		49.545569°N 5.472382°E	85047-CLT-0004-01 Info	Gebied van Montquintin comprenant (gebied van bijzondere waarde) More images
Manor farm of the castle (facades and roofs), all of the dovecote and the surrounding wall ^{(nl)} ^{(fr)}		Rouvroy	rue du Château fort, n°12	49.544774°N 5.472941°E	85047-CLT-0005-01 Info	
Museum of Rural Life, historical museum ^{(nl)} ^{(fr)}		Rouvroy	place Montseigneur de Hontheim	49.544774°N 5.473380°E	85047-CLT-0006-01 Info	Museum van het Landelijk Leven, voorheen museum More images
St. Martin's Church: tower ^{(nl)} ^{(fr)}		Rouvroy		49.538307°N 5.491373°E	85047-CLT-0007-01 Info	
farm ^{(nl)} ^{(fr)}		Rouvroy	rue Péchières, n°6	49.509174°N 5.473718°E	85047-CLT-0009-01 Info	
Nature reserve of Raymond Mayné ^{(nl)} ^{(fr)}		Rouvroy		49.511115°N 5.478620°E	85047-CLT-0011-01 Info	
Ensemble of Chapel of Notre-Dame de Luxembourg, the refuge area ^{(nl)} ^{(fr)}		Rouvroy	rue de l'Ermitage	49.508798°N 5.482190°E	85047-CLT-0013-01 Info	
Farm (facades and roofs) ^{(nl)} ^{(fr)}		Rouvroy	rue de Mathon, n°21	49.554305°N 5.499776°E	85047-CLT-0014-01 Info	
Washing place ^{(nl)} ^{(fr)}		Rouvroy	rue Grande	49.508106°N 5.474168°E	85047-CLT-0015-01 Info	
House ^{(nl)} ^{(fr)}		Rouvroy	rue Jean, n°15	49.506310°N 5.473180°E	85047-CLT-0016-01 Info	
Area Montquintin (area of special value) ^{(nl)} ^{(fr)}		Rouvroy		49.545569°N 5.472382°E	85047-PEX-0001-01 Info	Gebied van Montquintin (gebied van bijzondere waarde)

== See also ==
- List of protected heritage sites in Luxembourg (Belgium)
