= International rankings of Belgium =

These are the international rankings of Belgium.

== International rankings ==
Organization	Survey	Ranking	Out of	Year
Institute for Economics and Peace	Global Peace Index	11	158	2012
United Nations Development Programme	Human Development Index	18	187	2011
Transparency International	Corruption Perceptions Index	19	183	2011
World Economic Forum	Global Competitiveness Report	17	144	2012-2013
OECD	Physicians per 1000 population	2	30	2009
KOF Globalization Index	Globalization Index	1	181	2010
World Bank	Ease of doing business index	33	185	2013
Property Rights Alliance	International Property Rights Index	20	115	2007
J. David Singer	Composite Index of National Capability	43	193	2010
United Nations	UN e-Government Readiness Index	24	191	2010
Transparency International	Bribe Payers Index	3	28	2011
The Heritage Foundation	Index of Economic Freedom	38	179	2012
Reporters Without Borders	Press Freedom Index	20	179	2011-2012
Yale University and Columbia University	Environmental Performance Index	24	132	2012
University of Leicester	Satisfaction with Life Index	28	178	2006
Legatum	Legatum Prosperity Index	17	142	2012
International Telecommunication Union	Number of broadband Internet subscriptions	22	186	2010
E-readiness companies	E-readiness	20	70	2009
Economist Intelligence Unit	Quality-of-life Index	24	111	2005
UN DESA	Life expectancy	21	197	2011
United Nations	GDP (nominal)	23	195	2011
United Nations	GDP (nominal) per capita	19	194	2011
Organisation for Economic Co-operation and Development	Program for International Student Assessment	13	30	2006
United Nations	Education Index	18	181	2009
World Intellectual Property Organization	Global Innovation Index	22	139	2026
