= Torgny (village) =

Coordinates: 49.5072°N 5.4758°E

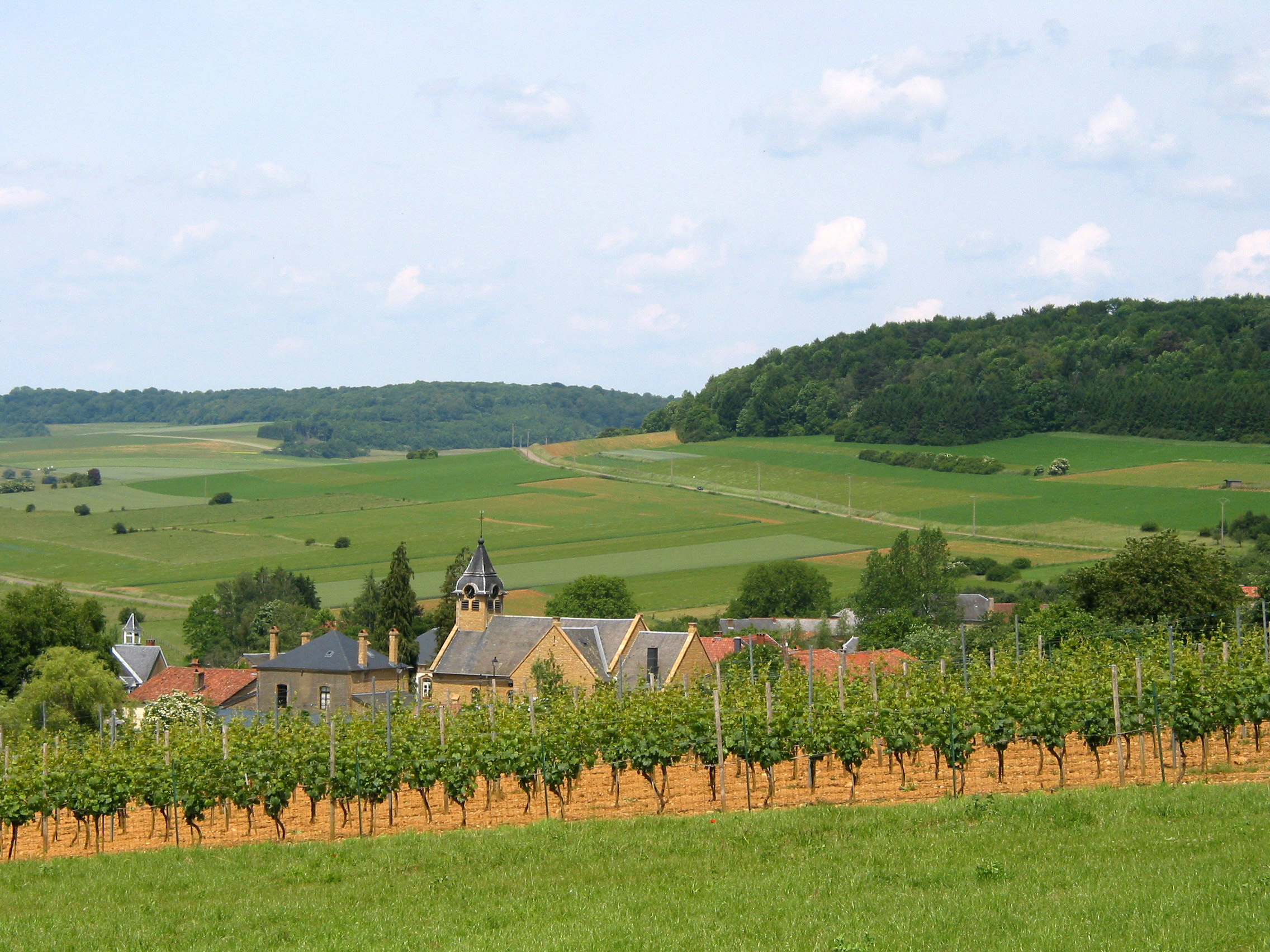
Torgny with vineyard

Torgny (French pronunciation: [tɔʁɲi]; Gaumais: Toûrgny) is a village of Wallonia and a district of the municipality of Rouvroy, located in the province of Luxembourg, Belgium.

It has about 200 inhabitants and is the southernmost place of Belgium. Till 1977 Torgny was a municipality.

The river Chiers borders the municipality of Rouvroy near Torgny.
