= Geology of Belgium =

The geology of Belgium encompasses rocks, minerals and tectonic events stretching back more than 500 million years. Belgium covers an area of about 30,507 square kilometers and was instrumental in the development of geology. The extensive outcrops in Belgium became the standard reference points in stratigraphy as early as the mid-19th century. Some of them are internationally recognized features related to the Carboniferous and the Devonian periods. These rocks were folded by two mountain building events: the Hercynian orogeny and Caledonian Orogeny. Paleozoic basement rocks cover much of the country and are overlain by Mesozoic and Cenozoic sediments.

== Physiography ==
Belgium is divided into three physiographic sections (lower, middle, and upper Belgium) extending from east to west. The middle part is composed Paleozoic rocks that are partially covered by Cenozoic sediments; while the upper part is made up of chains of rock related to the Caledonian orogeny and Hercynian orogeny. If the post-Paleozoic rock cover were to be removed from the basement complex, several other major rock groups would be exposed:

- The Brabant Massif
- The Caledonian complexes with Rocroi Massif, Serpont Massif, and Stavelot Massif, from north to south respectively
- The Dinant Synclinorium
- The Ardennes Anticlinorium
- The Hercynian complexes
- The Silurian Sambre et. Meuse Trough that is bound by the Condroz Thrust Fault
- The Condroz Thrust Fault that extends from northern France to Aachen in Germany
- The Campine Belt which is a Hercynian belt of sediments extending to the north of Brabant Massif and is covered by the post-Paleozoic cover

After the erosion of the Hercynian chain, there was a continuous intrusion of the basement rock by younger rocks and crustal warping. The evidence of Triassic and Permian sequences are visible in some of the boreholes in the Campine Belt, due to preservation by block faulting. The Jurassic outcrops found in the south-east of Ardennes are made up of littoral sandy facies of the Gaume (French Jurassic basin). In the Pays de Herve and Haine Gulf there are Cretaceous rocks found mainly in the gentle trough along the Condroz Fault.

== Stratigraphy and Sedimentation ==
=== Paleozoic ===
The stratigraphic column includes a series of repeated subsidence events, interrupted by diastrophism, with occasional uplifts, volcanism, and flysch sedimentation. The only exception to this is pattern are Cambrian and Silurian sediments. During the Devonian period, deposition left sediments that increase in thickness from north to south. The location of the continental masses was in the northern part of Belgium up to the Carboniferous period. Troughs were connected to basins in what is now France and parts of the Paleozoic period are absent from the stratigraphic column due to erosion, particularly in Brabant and the Ardennes. Early Devonian rocks are miogeosynclinal, while the middle and the upper Devonian preserve unstable basin and shelf sequences. Abraded continental blocks did not supply much of the detrital sedimentary material; with the exception of Famennian rocks. Arenite formed in these rocks as a result of early Hercynian orogeny tectonic activity.

The Dinantian carbonate shelf was preceded by sedimentation with infrequent marine incursions, and numerous coal seams. This sedimentation was later interrupted in the latter part of the Westphalian by the thrusting of the Ardennes and Dinant Synclinorium.

=== Mesozoic and Cenozoic ===
The Mesozoic is usually characterized by the stability and the peneplanation of the basement rock. The Germanic continental facies mark the Triassic, and a series of marine transgression events took place during the Albian, Maastrichtian, Hettangian and Bajocian. This peneplane was invaded from the northwest repeatedly by shallow seas in the Cenozoic period. This transgression rarely crossed the Condroz Fault system that acted as a hinge between the slightly elevated Dinant Synclinorium and the downwarped crust in northern Belgium.

Since the Quaternary was a period of extreme weather events, most of the geologic features (such as terraces and valleys) in Belgium developed during that time. For example, the Ardennes upland was mostly subjected to severe weathering related to glaciation. During the Holocene, and Flandrian, sections developed that were characterized by fluctuations in sea level that resulted in dunes and thin peat deposits.

== Economic geology ==
Due to the presence of the Westphalian coal deposits, the industrial revolution in Belgium paralleled that of England. The coal from the mines was used in the industries to produce steam. The main industries that were supported by coal include steel, cement, and glass industries. Most of these industries are found along the Hercynian axis. However, since the 1990s, the coal industry in Belgium has been depressed due to the unstable coal mines (caused by complicated tectonic movements) and struggled to compete with those in neighboring Germany and France. Steady production of coal, even from modern mines in Campine on the northern flank of the Brabant Massif, decreased from 30 million tons between 1930 and 1950 to about 10 million tons in 1970—a drop of about 20 million tonnes in a span of 20 years.

In Belgium, there are also quarries that produce Marbre Noir de Dinant, Red Frasnian Marble, and Bleu Belge, although most of them have closed due to the depletion of the mineral deposits. These marbles were exported to other parts of Europe as decorative and building stones as early as the Roman period. Operational mines produced three million tons of ornamental stone in the late 1990s. In the Hercynian rocks are hydrothermal veins and metasomatic replacements in carbonates there exist other mineral deposits such as fluorite, barite, sphalerite, galena pyrite, and smithsonite. However other mineral deposits were largely exhausted by the beginning of the 20th century.

Oil prospection has not been successful in Belgium due to the deformation and metamorphosis of the Paleozoic rocks.
