= List of mammals of Belgium =

This list of mammals of Belgium shows the IUCN Red List status of mammal species occurring in Belgium.

Icons which state each species' global IUCN status:
CR	Critically Endangered	In imminent risk of extinction in the wild
VU	Vulnerable	Facing a high risk of extinction in the wild
NT	Near Threatened	Doesn't meet any criteria that would categorise it as risking extinction but likely to in the future
LC	Least Concern	No current identifiable risks to this species
DD	Data Deficient	Inadequate information to make an assessment of the risks to this species

== Order: Artiodactyla (even-toed ungulates) ==
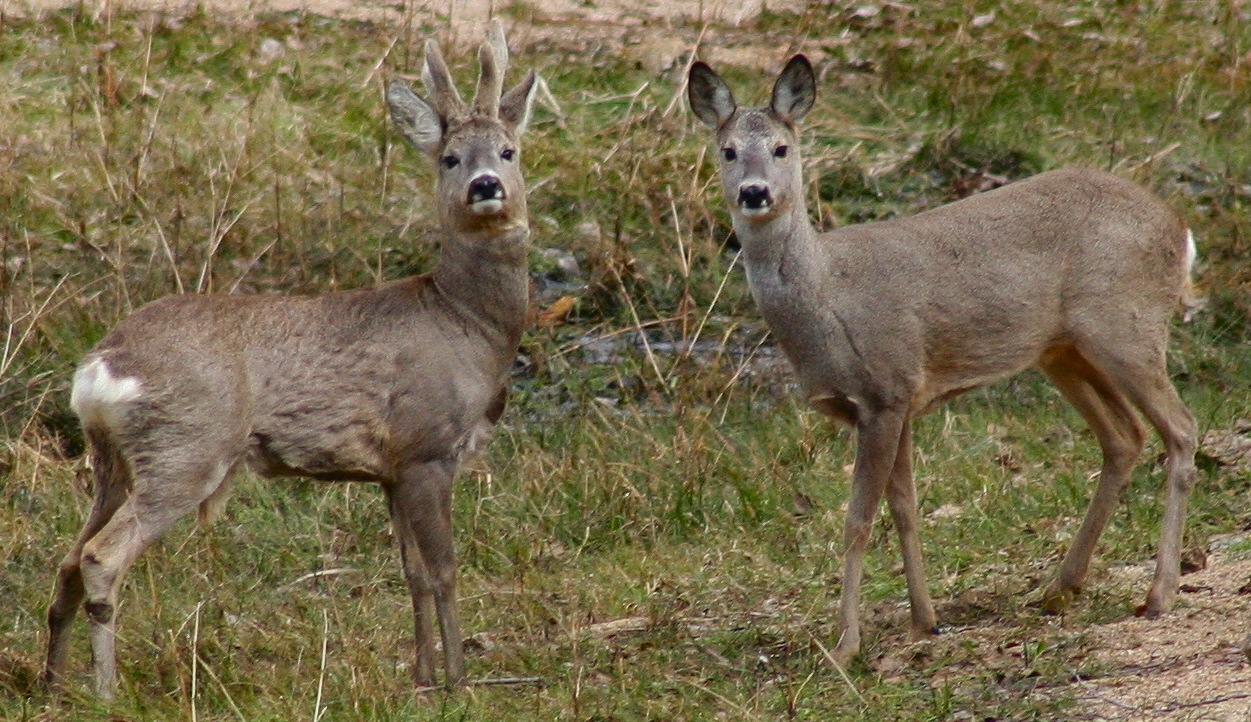
Roe deer

The even-toed ungulates are ungulates whose weight is borne about equally by the third and fourth toes, rather than mostly or entirely by the third as in perissodactyls. There are about 220 artiodactyl species, including many that are of great economic importance to humans.

- Family: Cervidae (deer)
  - Subfamily: Capreolinae
    - Genus: Capreolus
      - Roe deer, C. capreolus LC
  - Subfamily: Cervinae
    - Genus: Cervus
      - Red deer, C. elaphus LC
    - Genus: Dama
      - European fallow deer, D. dama LC introduced
- Family: Suidae (pigs)
  - Subfamily: Suinae
    - Genus: Sus
      - Wild boar, S. scrofa LC

== Order: Carnivora (carnivorans) ==
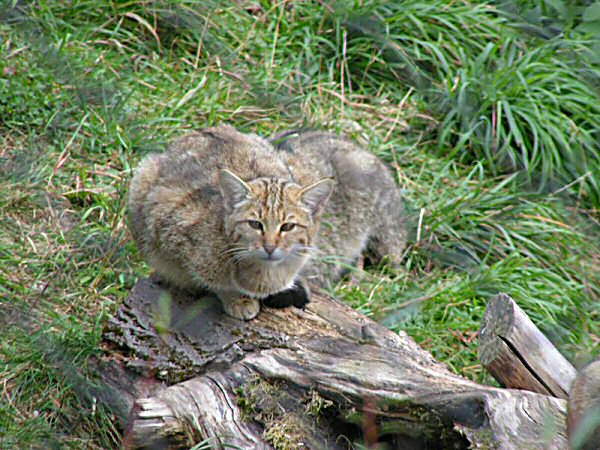
European wildcat

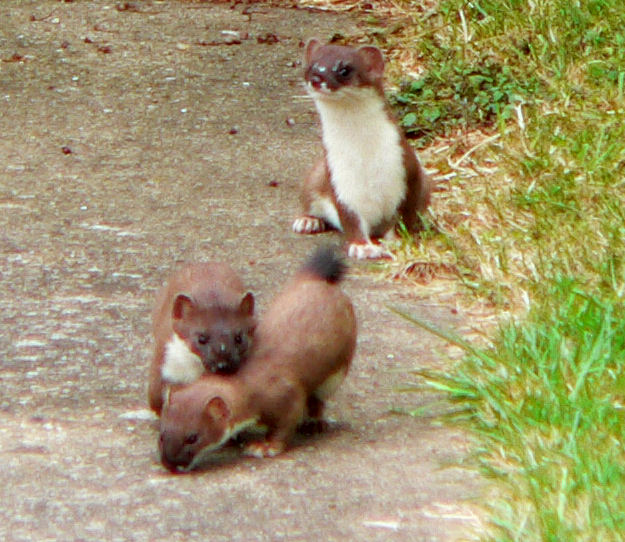
Stoat

There are over 260 species of carnivorans, the majority of which feed primarily on meat. They have a characteristic skull shape and dentition.

- Suborder: Feliformia
  - Family: Felidae (cats)
    - Subfamily: Felinae
      - Genus: Felis
        - European wildcat, F. silvestris LC
  - Family: Viverridae
    - Subfamily: Viverrinae
      - Genus: Genetta
        - Common genet, G. genetta LC introduced, presence uncertain
- Suborder: Caniformia
  - Family: Canidae (dogs, foxes)
    - Genus:Canis
      - Gray wolf, C. lupus LC
    - Genus: Vulpes
      - Red fox, V. vulpes LC
  - Family: Ursidae (bears)
    - Genus: Ursus
      - Brown bear, U. arctos LC presence uncertain
  - Family: Mustelidae (mustelids)
    - Genus: Lutra
      - European otter, L. lutra NT
    - Genus: Martes
      - Beech marten, M. foina LC
      - European pine marten, M. martes LC
    - Genus: Meles
      - European badger, M. meles LC
    - Genus: Mustela
      - Stoat, M. erminea LC
      - Least weasel, M. nivalis LC
      - European polecat, M. putorius LC
    - Genus: Neogale
      - American mink, N. vison LC presence uncertain, introduced
  - Family: Phocidae (earless seals)
    - Genus: Phoca
      - Common seal, P. vitulina LC
    - Genus: Halichoerus
      - Grey seal, H. grypus

== Order: Cetacea (whales) ==
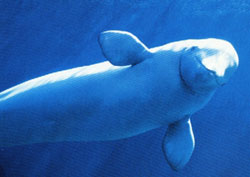
Beluga

The order Cetacea includes whales, dolphins and porpoises. They are the mammals most fully adapted to aquatic life with a spindle-shaped nearly hairless body, protected by a thick layer of blubber, and forelimbs and tail modified to provide propulsion underwater.

- Suborder: Mysticeti
  - Family: Balaenidae (right whales)
    - Genus: Balaena
      - Bowhead whale, Balaena mysticetus LC vagrant
    - Genus: Eubalaena
      - North Atlantic right whale, Eubalaena glacialis CR almost extinct in eastern North Atlantic
  - Family: Megapterinae (humpback whales)
    - Genus: Megaptera
      - Humpback whale, Megaptera novaeangliae LC
  - Family: Balaenopteridae
    - Subfamily: Balaenopterinae (rorquals)
      - Genus: Balaenoptera
        - Fin whale, Balaenoptera physalus VU
        - Minke whale, Balaenoptera acutorostrata LC
- Suborder: Odontoceti
  - Superfamily: Platanistoidea
    - Family: Physeteridae
      - Genus: Physeter (sperm whales)
        - Sperm whale, Physeter macrocephalus VU
    - Family: Kogiidae
      - Genus: Kogia (pygmy sperm whales)
        - Pygmy sperm whale, Kogia breviceps LC
    - Family: Monodontidae
      - Genus: Delphinapterus (beluga and narwhals)
        - Beluga, Delphinapterus leucas LC
    - Family: Phocoenidae
      - Genus: Phocoena (harbor porpoises)
        - Harbour porpoise, Phocoena phocoena LC
    - Family: Ziphidae
      - Subfamily: Hyperoodontinae
        - Genus: Mesoplodon (beaked whales)
          - Sowerby's beaked whale, Mesoplodon bidens LC
    - Family: Delphinidae (marine dolphins)
      - Genus: Lagenorhynchus
        - White-beaked dolphin, Lagenorhynchus albirostris LC
      - Genus: Leucopleurus
        - Atlantic white-sided dolphin, Leucopleurus acutus LC
      - Genus: Stenella
        - Striped dolphin, Stenella coeruleoalba LC
      - Genus: Tursiops
        - Common bottlenose dolphin, Tursiops truncatus LC
      - Genus: Delphinus
        - Short-beaked common dolphin, Delphinus delphis LC
        - Long-beaked common dolphin, Delphinus capensis LC
      - Genus: Steno
        - Rough-toothed dolphin, Steno bredanensis LC
      - Genus: Grampus
        - Risso's dolphin, Grampus griseus LC
      - Genus: Globicephala
        - Pilot whale, Globicephala melas LC
      - Genus: Orcinus
        - Orca, Orcinus orca DD
      - Genus: Pseudorca
        - False killer whale, Pseudorca crassidens NT

== Order: Chiroptera (bats) ==
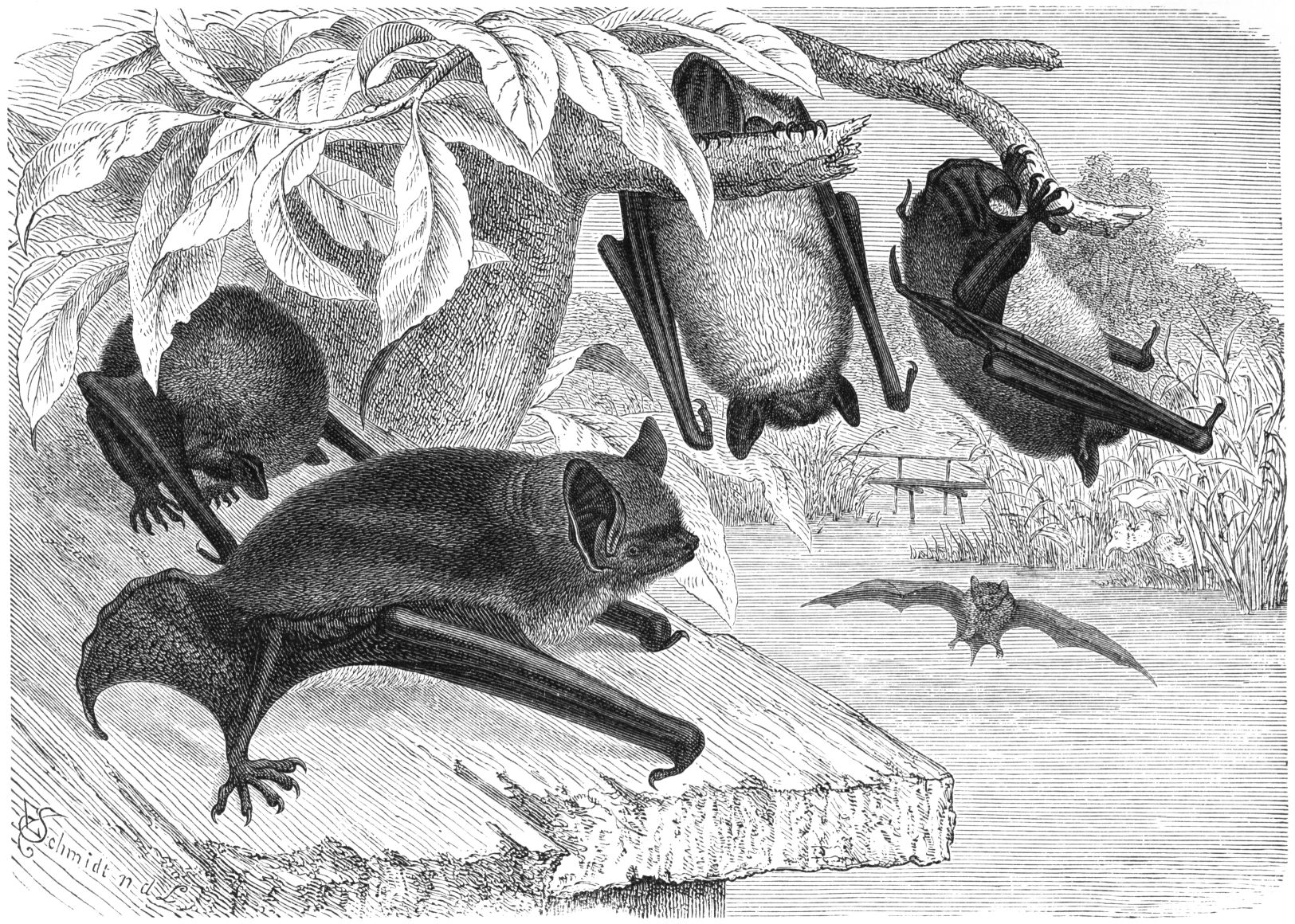
Daubenton's bat

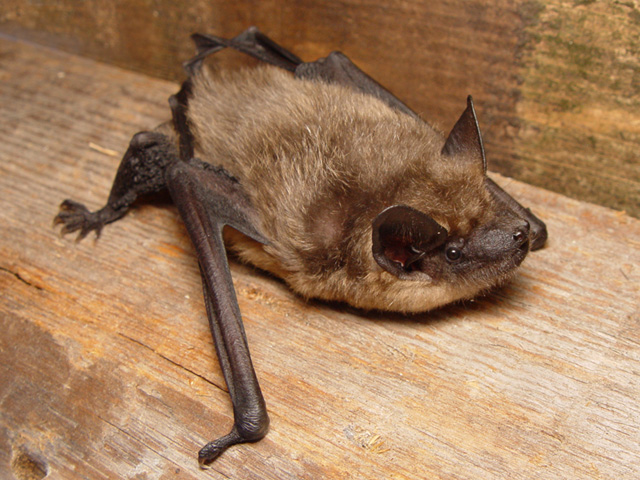
Serotine bat

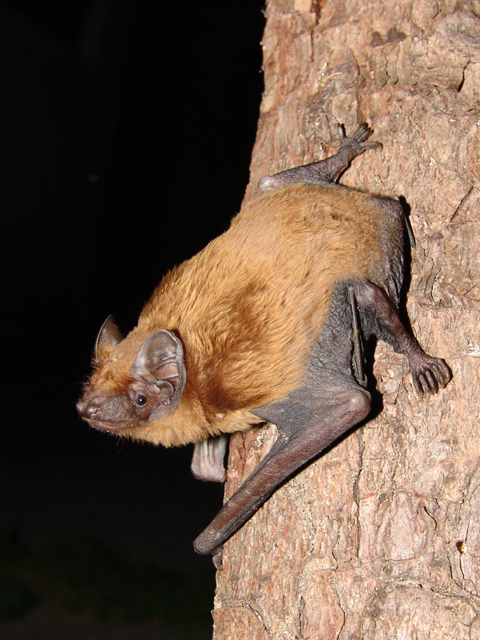
Common noctule

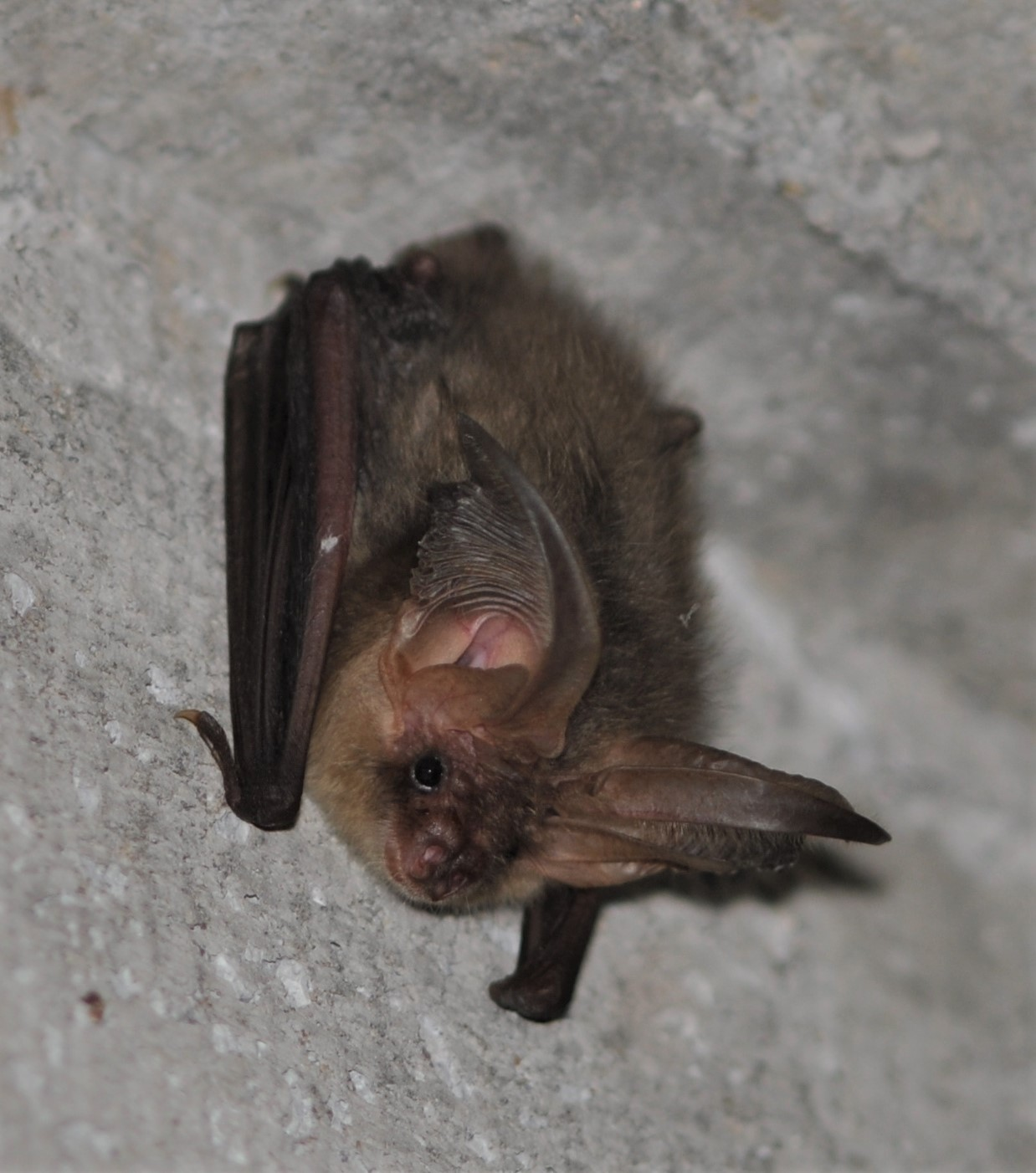
Brown long-eared bat

The bats' most distinguishing feature is that their forelimbs are developed as wings, making them the only mammals capable of flight. Bat species account for about 20% of all mammals.

- Family: Vespertilionidae
  - Subfamily: Myotinae
    - Genus: Myotis
      - Bechstein's bat, M. bechsteini NT
      - Brandt's bat, M. brandti LC
      - Pond bat, M. dasycneme NT
      - Daubenton's bat, M. daubentonii LC
      - Geoffroy's bat, M. emarginatus LC
      - Greater mouse-eared bat, M. myotis LC
      - Whiskered bat, M. mystacinus LC
      - Natterer's bat, M. nattereri LC
  - Subfamily: Vespertilioninae
    - Genus: Barbastella
      - Western barbastelle, B. barbastellus NT
    - Genus: Eptesicus
      - Northern bat, Eptesicus nilssoni LC
      - Serotine bat, Eptesicus serotinus LC
    - Genus: Nyctalus
      - Common noctule, N. noctula LC
      - Lesser noctule, N. leisleri LC
    - Genus: Pipistrellus
      - Nathusius' pipistrelle, P. nathusii LC
      - Common pipistrelle, P. pipistrellus LC
    - Genus: Plecotus
      - Brown long-eared bat, P. auritus LC
      - Grey long-eared bat, P. austriacus NT
- Family: Rhinolophidae
  - Subfamily: Rhinolophinae
    - Genus: Rhinolophus
      - Greater horseshoe bat, R. ferrumequinum LC extirpated
      - Lesser horseshoe bat, R. hipposideros LC

== Order: Eulipotyphla (hedgehogs, shrews and moles) ==
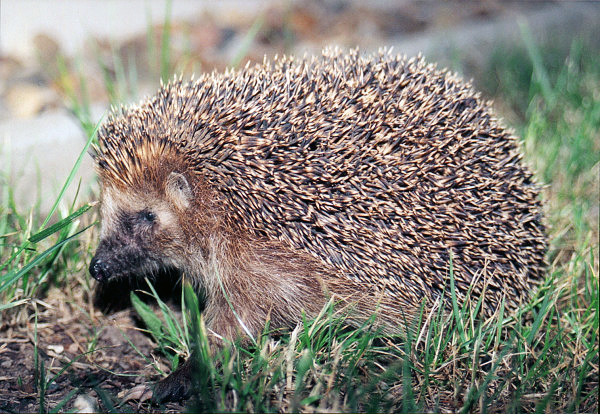
West European hedgehog

Hedgehogs are easily recognised by their spines, shrews closely resemble mice, and moles are stout-bodied burrowers.

- Family: Erinaceidae (hedgehogs)
  - Subfamily: Erinaceinae
    - Genus: Erinaceus
      - West European hedgehog, E. europaeus NT
- Family: Soricidae (shrews)
  - Subfamily: Crocidurinae
    - Genus: Crocidura
      - Bicolored shrew, Crocidura leucodon LC
      - Greater white-toothed shrew, Crocidura russula LC
  - Subfamily: Soricinae
    - Tribe: Nectogalini
      - Genus: Neomys
        - Southern water shrew, Neomys anomalus LC
        - Eurasian water shrew, Neomys fodiens LC
    - Tribe: Soricini
      - Genus: Sorex
        - Crowned shrew, Sorex coronatus LC
        - Eurasian pygmy shrew, Sorex minutus LC
- Family: Talpidae (moles)
  - Subfamily: Talpinae
    - Tribe: Talpini
      - Genus: Talpa
        - European mole, Talpa europaea LC

== Order: Lagomorpha (lagomorphs) ==
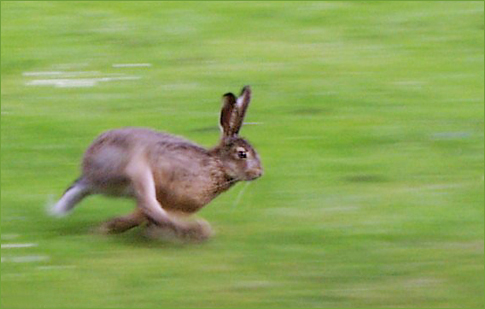
European hare

The lagomorphs comprise two families, Leporidae (hares and rabbits), and Ochotonidae (pikas). Though they can resemble rodents, and were classified as a superfamily in that order until the early twentieth century, they have since been considered a separate order. They differ from rodents in a number of physical characteristics, such as having four incisors in the upper jaw rather than two.

- Family: Leporidae (rabbits, hares)
  - Genus: Lepus
    - European hare, L. europaeus LC
  - Genus: Oryctolagus
    - European rabbit, O. cuniculus NT introduced

== Order: Rodentia (rodents) ==
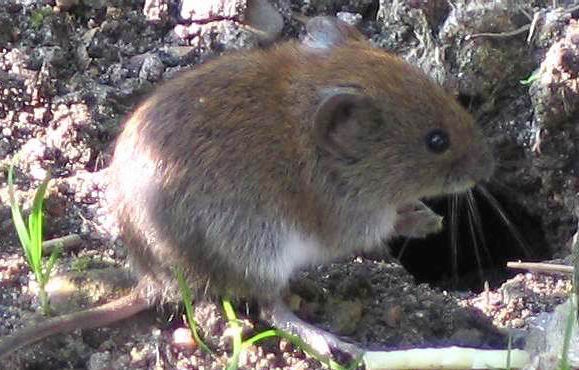
Bank vole

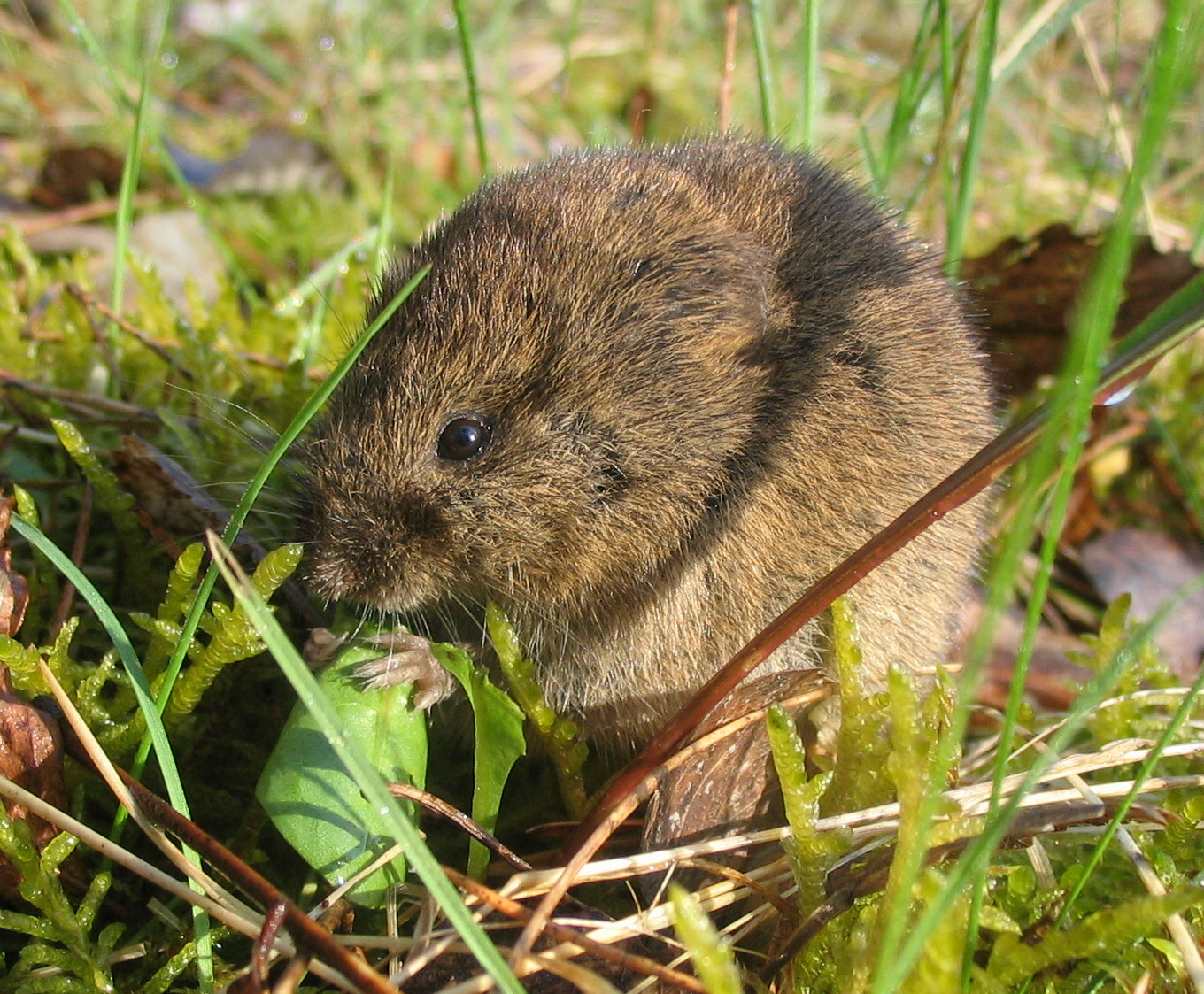
Common vole

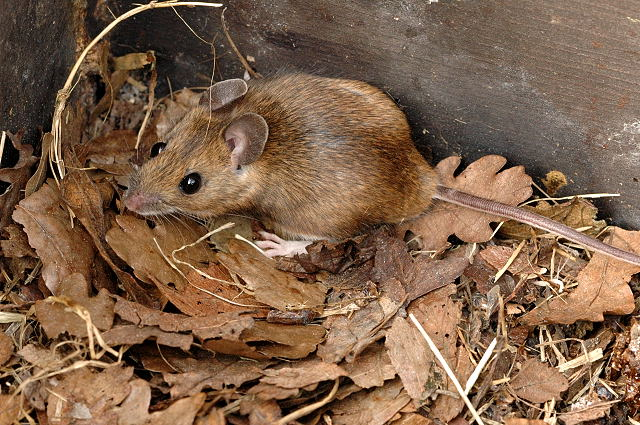
Yellow-necked mouse

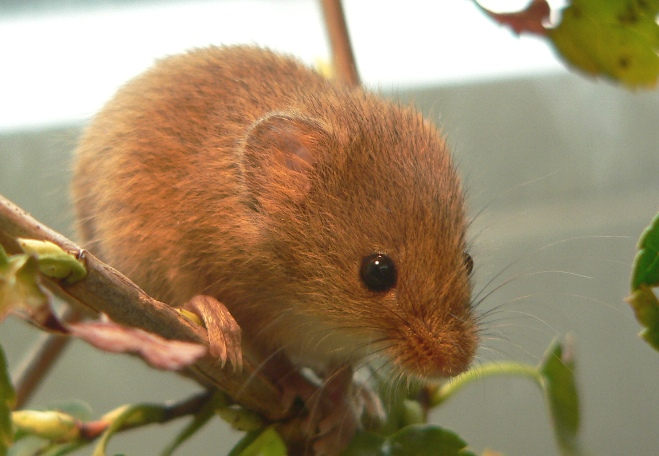
Eurasian harvest mouse

Rodents make up the largest order of mammals, with over 40% of mammalian species. They have two incisors in the upper and lower jaw which grow continually and must be kept short by gnawing.

- Suborder: Sciurognathi
  - Family: Castoridae (beavers)
    - Genus: Castor
      - Eurasian beaver, C. fiber LC
  - Family: Sciuridae (squirrels)
    - Subfamily: Sciurinae
      - Tribe: Sciurini
        - Genus: Sciurus
          - Red squirrel, S. vulgaris LC
  - Family: Gliridae (dormice)
    - Subfamily: Leithiinae
      - Genus: Eliomys
        - Garden dormouse, E. quercinus NT
      - Genus: Muscardinus
        - Hazel dormouse, M. avellanarius LC
    - Subfamily: Glirinae
      - Genus: Glis
        - European edible dormouse, Glis glis LC
  - Family: Cricetidae
    - Subfamily: Cricetinae
      - Genus: Cricetus
        - European hamster, C. cricetus CR
    - Subfamily: Arvicolinae
      - Genus: Arvicola
        - European water vole, A. amphibius LC
      - Genus: Clethrionomys
        - Bank vole, Clethrionomys glareolus LC
      - Genus: Microtus
        - Field vole, Microtus agrestis LC
        - Common vole, Microtus arvalis LC
        - European pine vole, Microtus subterraneus LC
  - Family: Muridae (mice, rats, voles, gerbils, hamsters, etc.)
    - Subfamily: Murinae
      - Genus: Mus
        - House mouse, M. musculus LC
      - Genus: Apodemus
        - Yellow-necked mouse, Apodemus flavicollis LC
        - Wood mouse, Apodemus sylvaticus LC
      - Genus: Micromys
        - Eurasian harvest mouse, Micromys minutus LC
      - Genus: Rattus
        - Brown rat, Rattus norvegicus LC
  - Family: Myocastoridae
    - Genus: Myocastor
      - Coypu, Myocastor coypus LC introduced

== Locally extinct ==
- European bison, Bison bonasus

== See also ==
- List of chordate orders
- Lists of mammals by region
- List of prehistoric mammals
- Mammal classification
- List of mammals described in the 2000s
