= National symbols of Belgium =

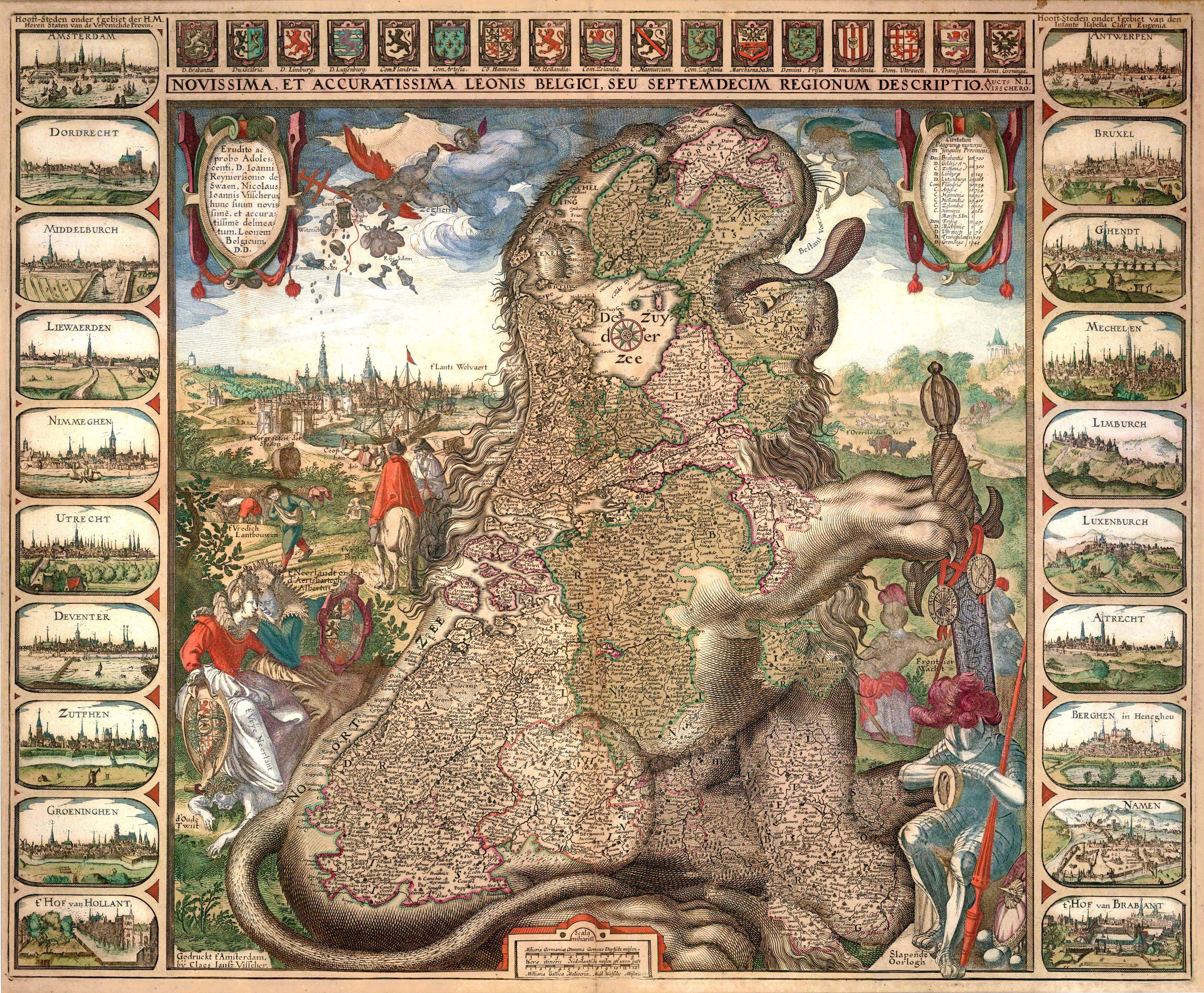
Leo Belgicus

National symbols of Belgium are the symbols used to represent the Kingdom of Belgium. Article 193 of the Belgian Constitution is dedicated to specifying the national flag, colours, coat of arms, and motto. It says the following: "The Belgian nation takes red, yellow and black as colours, and as state coat of arms the Belgian lion with the motto Unity makes strength."

== National day ==
The national holiday of Belgium, Belgian National Day, is commemorated annually on 21 July, but even though it is official, it is usually not considered a national symbol. The Flemish holiday is celebrated on 11 July, the Walloon holiday is celebrated on the third Sunday in September, the French-speaking Community's holiday is celebrated on 27 September, the German-speaking Community's holiday is celebrated on 5 November and the Brussels holiday is celebrated on 8 May.

== Kingdom of Belgium ==
Flag	Heraldry	Motto	Anthem
Flag of Belgium	Coat of arms of Belgium	Unity Makes Strength Dutch: Eendracht Maakt Macht French: L'Union Fait La Force German: Einigkeit Macht Stark	Brabançonne

== Regions and Communities ==
	Brussels-Capital Region	Flemish Community	Flemish Region	French-speaking Community	Walloon Region	German-speaking Community
Flag	Flag of the Brussels-Capital Region	Flag of Flanders		Flag of Wallonia		Flag of the German-speaking Community
Heraldry	None	Coat of arms of Flanders		Coat of arms of Wallonia		Flag of the German-speaking Community
Anthem	None	De Vlaamse Leeuw		Le Chant des Wallons		None
Floral emblem	Yellow iris	Poppy		Gaillardia		Gentiana
Motto	None	None		French: Wallon toujours		None
Animal	None	Lion		Rooster		None
Patron Saint	St. Michael	St. Ludgardis		None		None

== Unofficial symbols ==
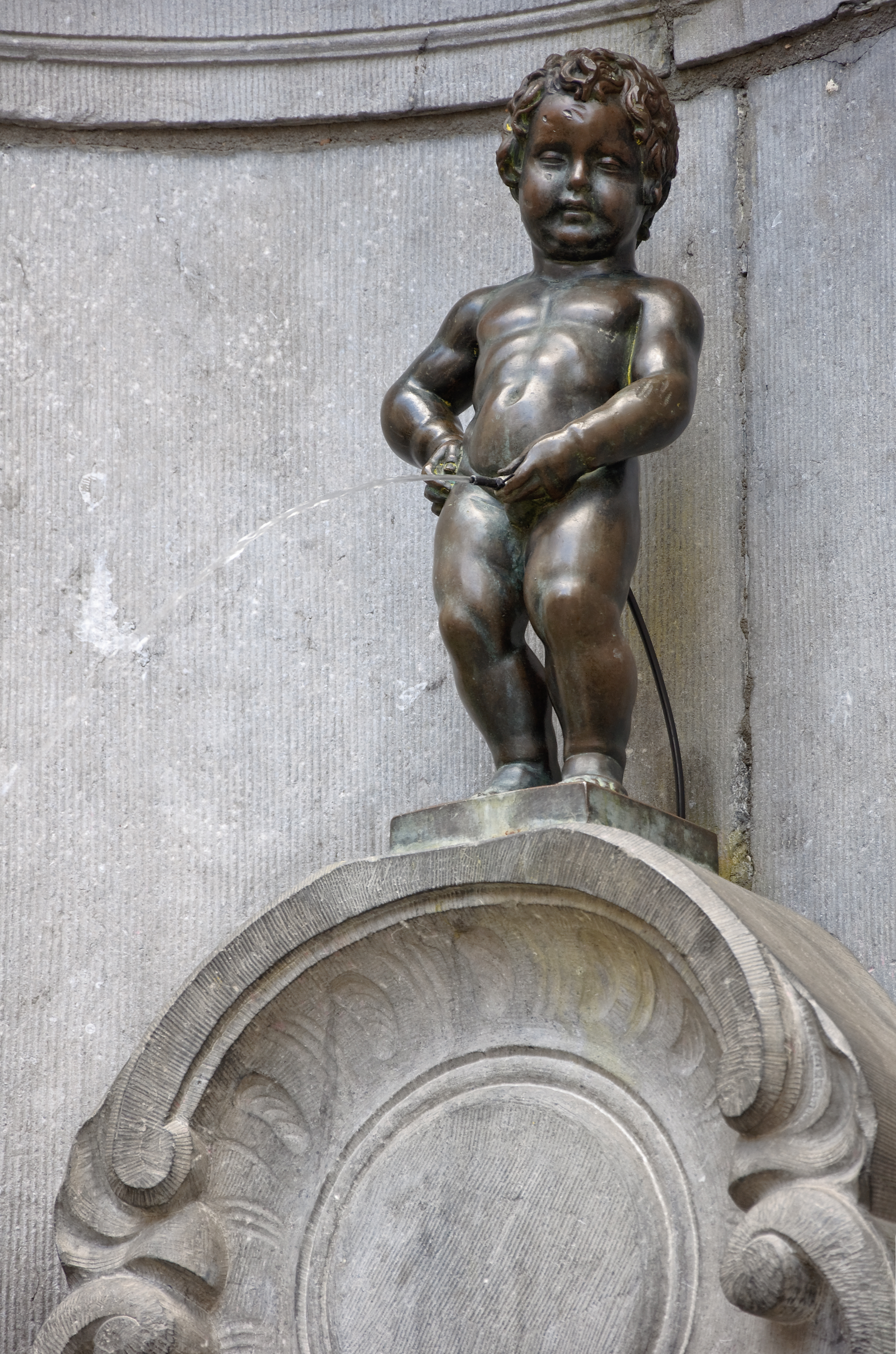
Manneken Pis

The lion, especially the Leo Belgicus (Latin for "Belgian Lion") has been used as a heraldic animal to represent the Benelux for centuries. A heraldic lion can be seen on the Belgian coat of arms and can be seen as the countries de facto national animal. Moules-frites is often considered the unofficial national dish of Belgium. The red poppy (papaver rhoeas) is often considered the national unofficial national flower of Belgium. Other symbols of Belgium might include Manneken Pis, the Atomium, Belgian waffles, and Belgian fries, which were invented in Belgium.

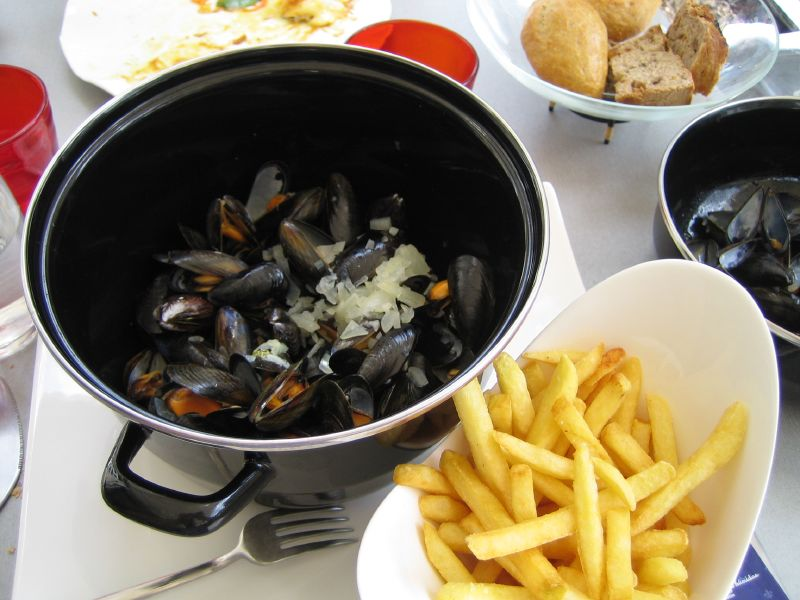
Moules-frites

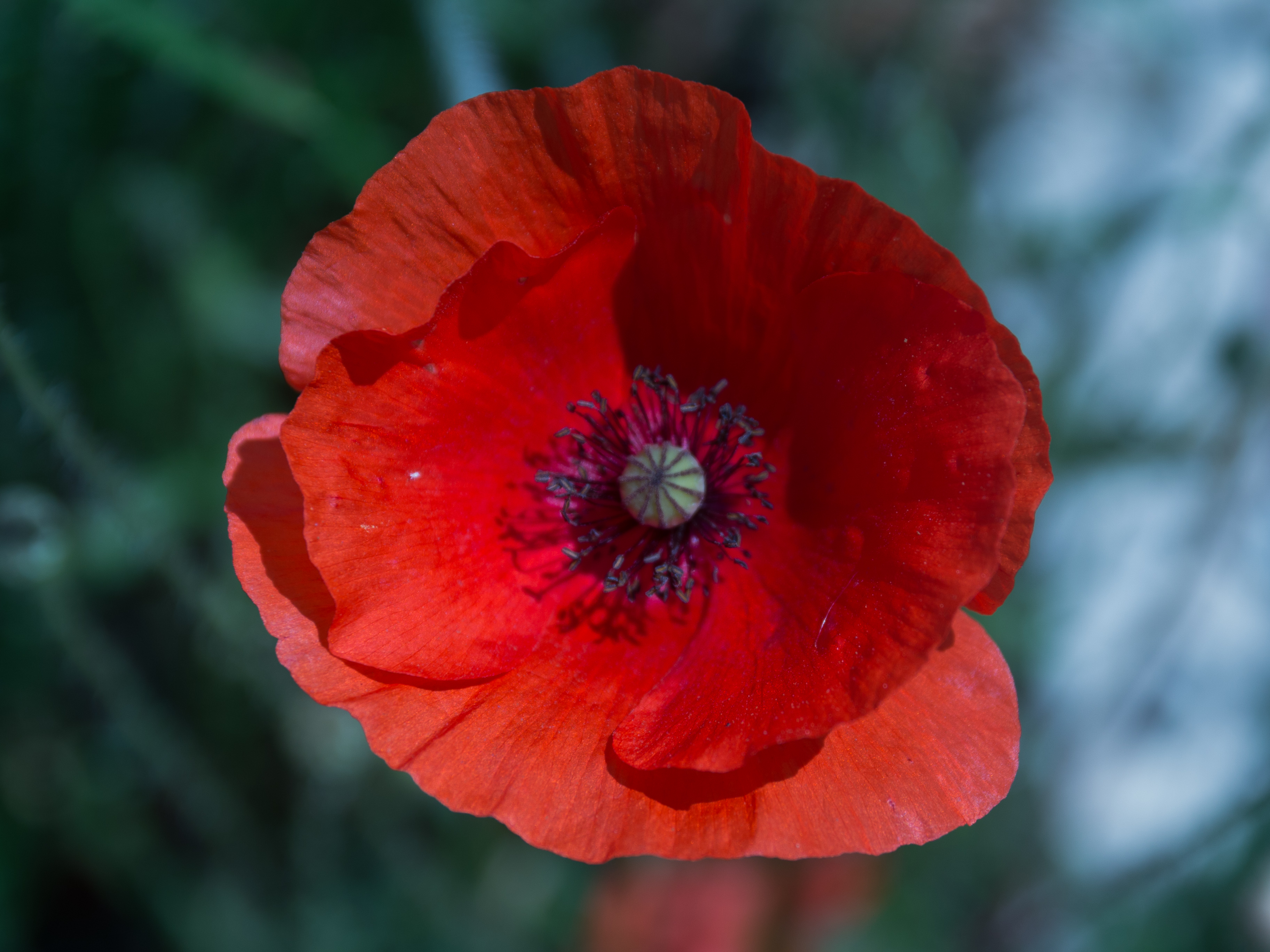
Red poppy

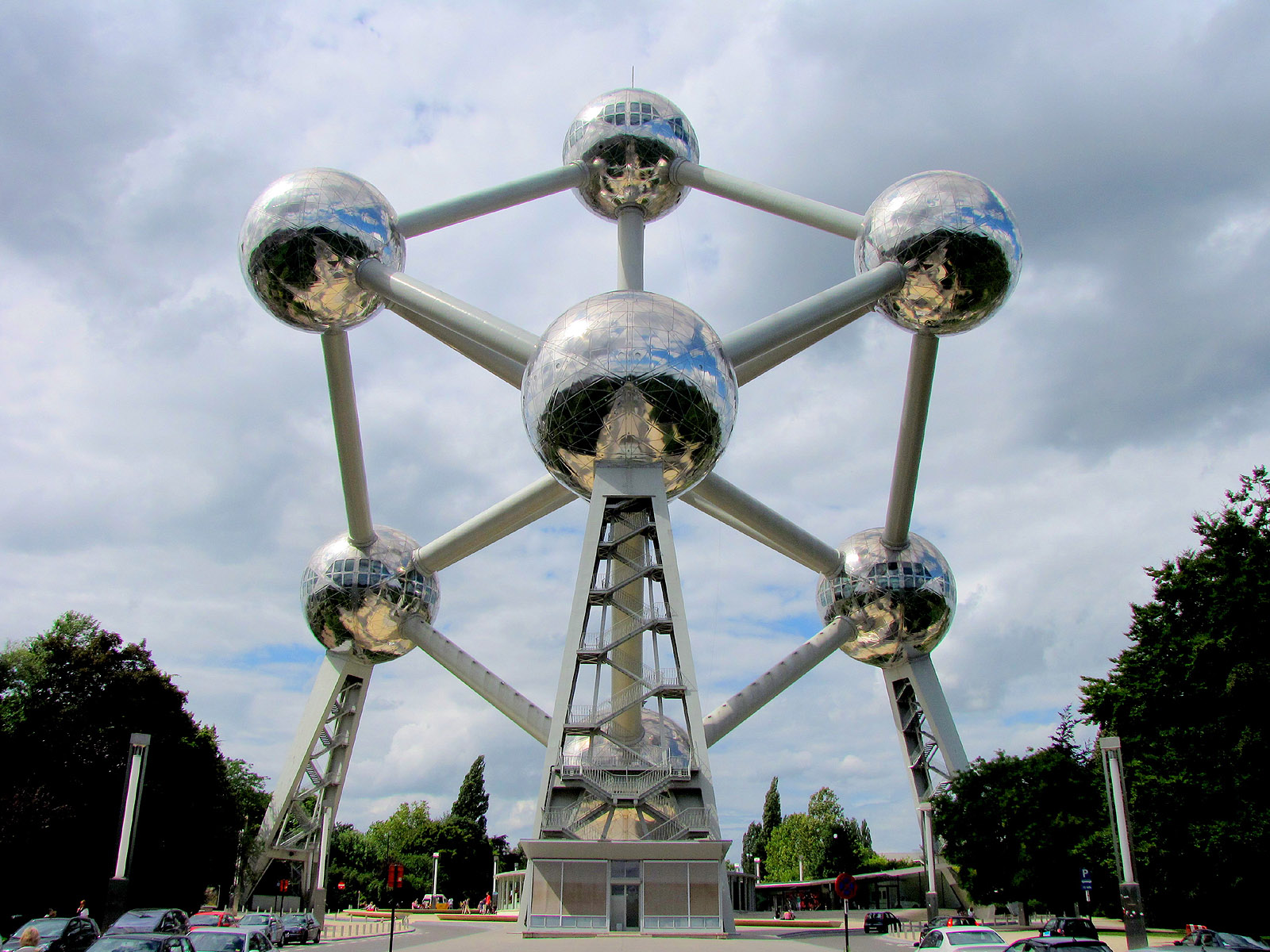
The Atomium

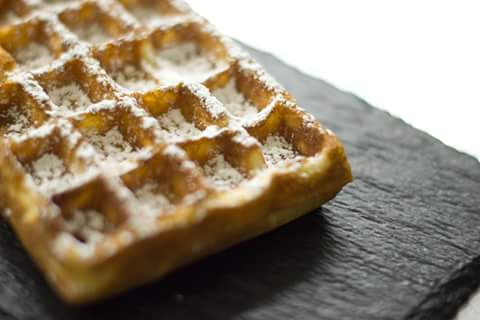
Brussels waffle

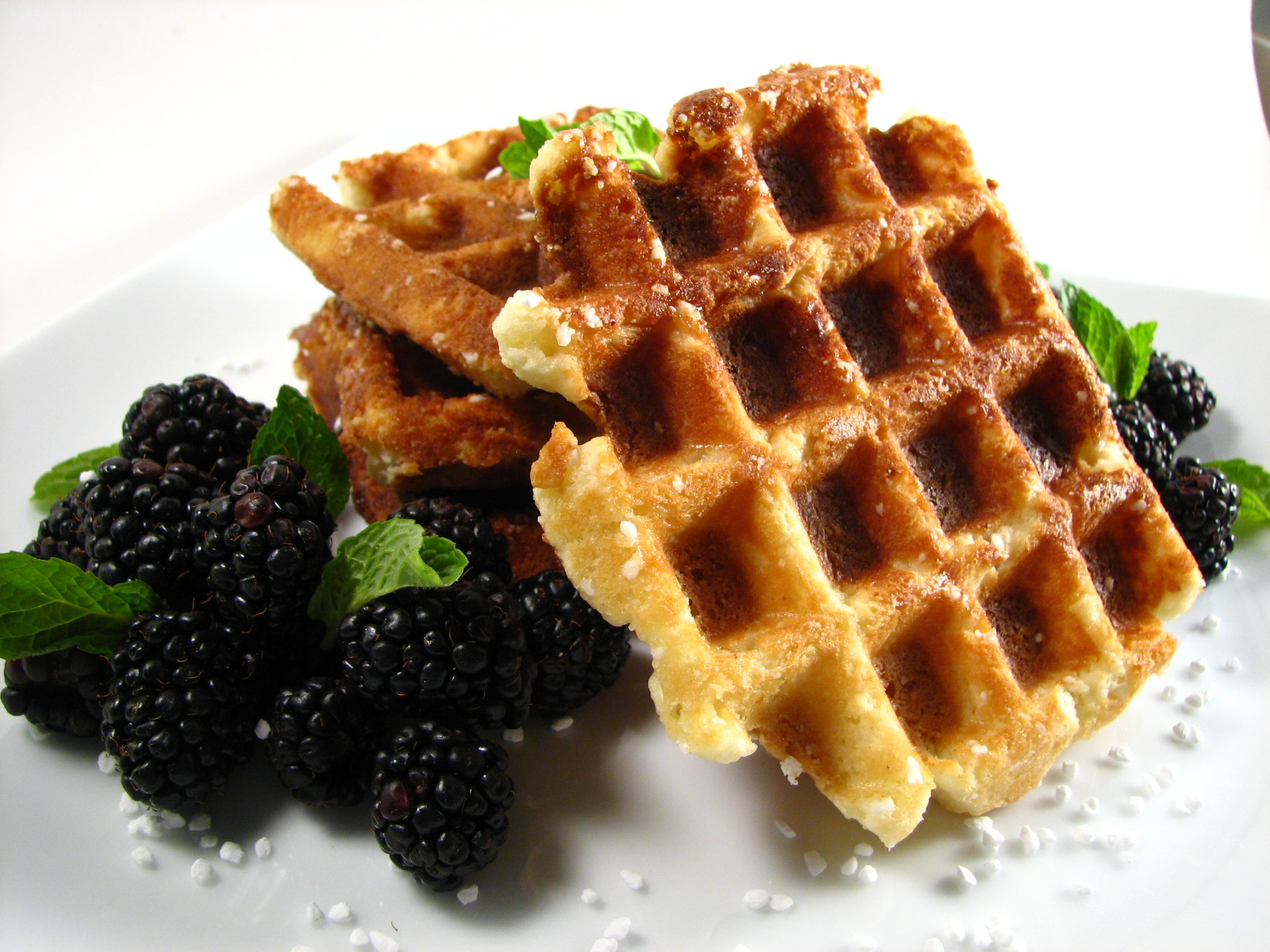
Liège waffle

== See also ==
- Belgian heraldry
- Coats of arms of Belgium
