= Environment of Belgium =

The environment of Belgium is generally affected by the high population density in most of the country. However, due to consistent efforts by the various levels of government in Belgium, the state of the environment in Belgium is gradually improving. These efforts have led to Belgium being ranked as one of the top 10 countries (9 out of 132) in terms of environmental protection trends. However, water quality still suffers from a relatively low, yet increasing percentage of sewage waste-water treatment, and from historical pollution accumulated in sediments. Air quality is generally good to average, but is affected by emissions from traffic and house heating, and industrial air pollution blowing over from the neighboring heavily industrialized Ruhr-area in Germany. Biodiversity is lower in Flanders than in Wallonia because of population density and fragmentation of habitats, but efforts are being made to boost bio-diversity through connecting fragmented forests and national parks through wildlife crossing "ecoducts" such as in Kikbeek.

Belgium has one of Europe's highest waste recycling rates. In particular, the Flemish region of Belgium has the highest waste diversion rate in Europe. Almost 75% of the residential waste produced there is reused, recycled, or composted.

Since the 1993 State Reform, the environment is a regional responsibility, with the Flemish, Walloon and Brussels-Capital Regions responsible for environmental matters in their respective territories. This has led to differences in legislation and separation of measurements and publication of statistics.

== Air ==
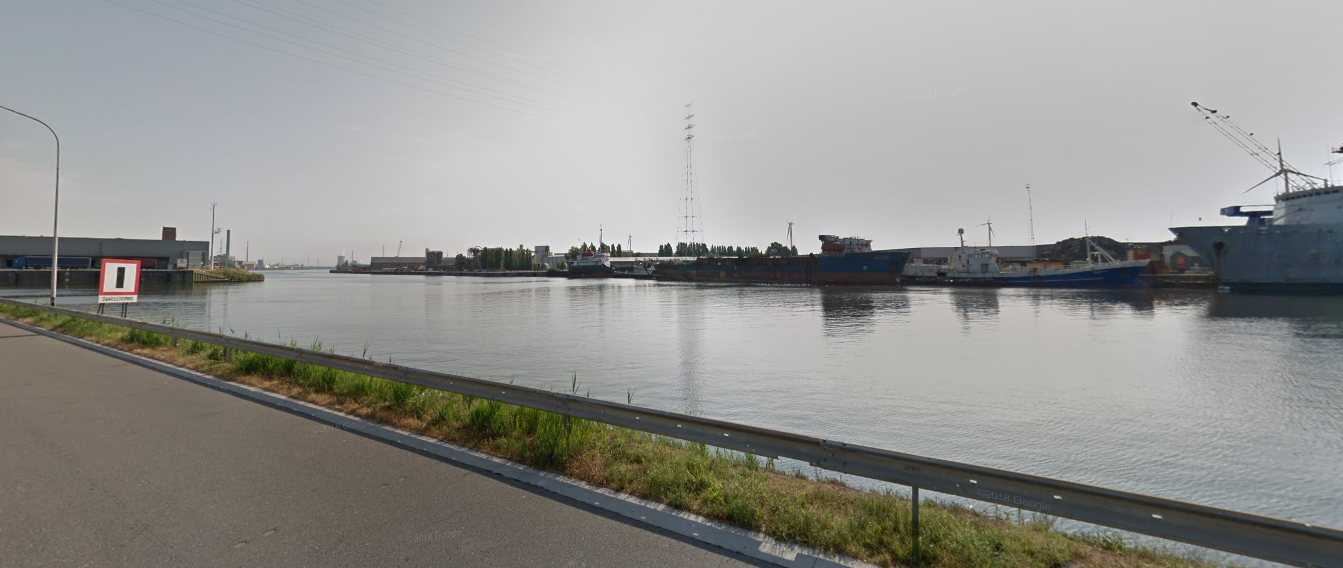

In Flanders, emission of non-methane VOCs has decreased from 200 kton in 1990 to around 100 kton in 2006, because of lower emissions from transport and industry. These two however remain the most important VOC polluters.

Particulate matter emissions and environmental concentrations have decreased since 1995, but little improvement is visible since 2000. European Union targets for average daily PM10 concentrations in 2005 have not been met and a significant increase was seen in 2006 compared to 2005. The problem is mostly situated in cities and industrial areas.

Total acidifying emissions have decreased very rapidly since 1990, but NOx still remains a problem. Half of NOx emissions are due to transport.

Photo-chemical air pollution remains a problem. On hot summer days, ozone levels frequently surpass EU targets. In 2006, the average was 6970 ug/m3 while the EU target is 5800 ug/m3.

Greenhouse gas emissions have fallen from 90 Mton CO_{2}-eq in 2003 to 85 Mton CO_{2}-eq in 2006. The Kyoto target for Flanders is 82.5 Mton during the period 2008-2012.

Belgium was poorly ranked in the Climate Change Performance Index due to the lack of regional teamwork. Wallonia has decreased its emissions by 34% since 1990, the highest reduction rate out of the three regions. It was the only region to respect the ulterior targets set by the European Commission, while Flanders and Brussels had poorer performance. This high reduction was mainly due to the 58% CO_{2} decrease in the industrial sector, by closing a huge part of its coal and steel industry. Wallonia is, thus, the only region following European expectations, although the use of the car remains relatively high due to hilly terrain.

Many of the airports in Belgium have been carbon neutral relative to their activities since 2018.

== Waste Treatment ==
Although the generation of hazardous industrial waste remains high relative to population, Belgians generate less municipal waste than its neighbours, with 416 kilograms per capita compared to a European average of 505 kilograms. Belgium is also a leader in municipal waste treatment, with 98,5% of the waste recycled (34%), composted (20%), incinerated with energy recovery (42%), and anaerobically digested (2,5%). Only 1,5% of municipal waste ends up to definitive disposal (either through landfills or brute incineration), which means a bit more than 5 kgs per capita.

Belgium also has the best packaging recycling program, with its 88%. 100% of the glass thrown away is recycled, as well as 98% of metal, aluminum and wood, 93% of paper and card board, however, plastic remains relatively low, with only 44% of it recycled.

The generation of industrial waste is relatively high, as mentioned previously, but on average, 96% is treated, either in Europe or in Asian countries. Until 2021, when some asian countries banned certain quantities of waste exported to their countries, Belgium was a big exporter of industrial waste in Turkey, Malaysia, and China, where it was recycled or incinerated.

== Water ==
Although Belgium still faces challenges such as river water pollution, on average, the water quality is improving quickly, mainly because of increasing waste-water treatment. In recent years, salmon and trout is seen again in Belgium's main rivers. Moreover, according to the EU Commission (2015 report), the water quality at the Belgian coast was ranked excellent in over two out of three locations (i.e. 17) where samples were taken.

== Soil ==
Belgium has a relatively flat but diverse landscape and a variety of soils throughout the country.

Belgium has cooler and wetter conditions compared to much of the rest of Europe due to the North Sea. Flanders has mostly sandy and clay soil types due to the region's location near the sea. Wallonia has a more hilly terrain with the soil composed of limestone, phyllites, quartzite, shales, and sandstones.

=== Soil contamination ===
Parts of Flanders used thermal processes to extract zinc from zinc ore until 1970, resulting in heavy metal contamination in the area. In the south of Belgium, the deposition of airborne pollutants from the industrial areas of Antwerp and the Ruhr is contributing to the effects of soil contamination in acid sandy soils. Agricultural areas have high concentrations of phosphates due to heavy use of fertilizers in the past.

== Noise ==
Car traffic is the main cause of noise pollution in Belgium, with noise from trains, airplanes, and other transportation methods as contributing factors. In order to reduce noise pollution, the capital region of Brussels has announced several measures including support for quieter public and private transport fleets, extension of limited speed zones, increased use of quiet road pavement, and promotion of using acoustic insulators in construction and renovation of new buildings.

== Energy ==
A bit less than 70% of Belgium's overall energy supply comes from fossil fuels, which is under the OECD limit of 79%, but relatively high to many countries in Europe. Due to its lack of potential for renewable energy, nuclear energy dominates the clean energy sector.

Wallonia is able to get its energy from cleaner sources than in Flanders due to the fact that its electricity consumption is lower.

== Biodiversity ==
Following the approach of the Netherlands, a Red List was created for Belgium.

In regards to the native fish species, a list can be found here. At present, 8 of the 12 migratory fish (found in Belgium's rivers) are threatened. These include Coregonus oxyrinchus, Coregonus lavaretus, Alosa alosa, Acipenser sturio, Petromyzon marinus, Salmo salar, Alosa fallax, Salmo trutta trutta

== Protected areas ==
The pan-European ecological network Natura 2000 covers 428,908 hectares in Belgium, representing 12.6% of the land area and 12% of the territorial waters.

Famous protected areas include the High Fens, Belgium's first national park, and the Hoge Kempen National Park, which is the newest national park in Belgium, and opened in 2006.

== Forests ==
Belgium had a 2018 Forest Landscape Integrity Index mean score of 1.36/10, ranking it 163rd globally out of 172 countries. Forests cover ~29% of Belgium's territory.

== See also ==
- Belgium
