= Religion in Belgium =

Religion in Belgium (European Social Survey 2023)
1. No religion (59%)
2. Catholicism (31%)
3. Protestantism (1%)
4. Eastern Orthodoxy (1%)
5. Other Christians (1%)
6. Islam (6%)
7. Other religions (1%)
Religion in Belgium (Eurobarometer 2021)
1. Catholicism (44%)
2. Protestantism and other Christians (4%)
3. Eastern Orthodoxy (1%)
4. Nonbeliever (26%)
5. Atheism (15%)
6. Islam (2%)
7. Buddhism (1%)
8. Other religions (7%)

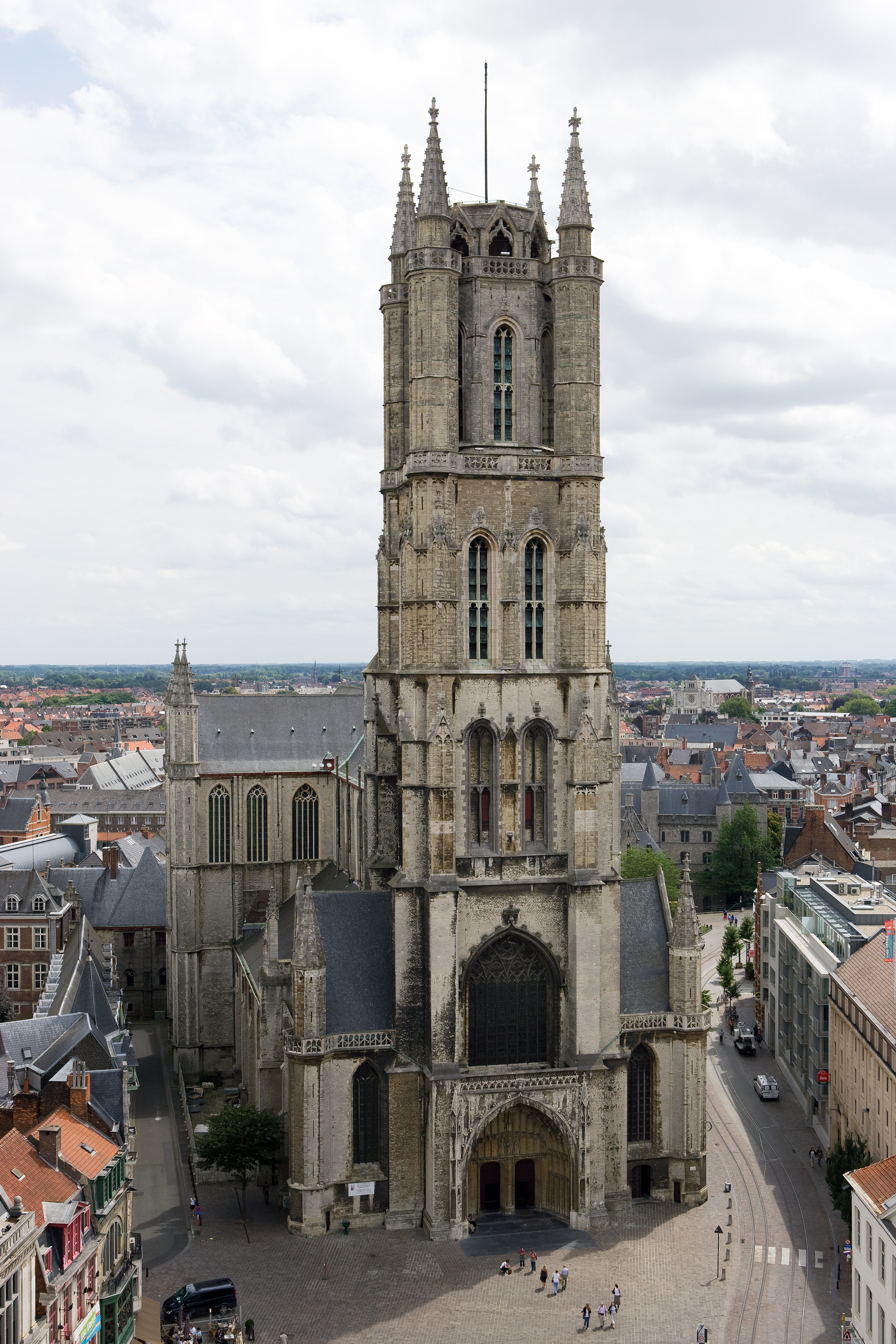
Saint Bavo's Cathedral in Ghent.

Most people in Belgium do not belong to a religion. Christianity is the largest religion, with the Catholic Church representing the largest community. Catholicism has experienced a significant decline since the 1950s when it was the nominal religion of over 80% of the population. Belgium's policy separates the state from the church, and freedom of religion is guaranteed by the country's constitution.

According to the European Social Survey in 2023, people who did not belong to a religion comprised 59% of the Belgian population. The share of Christians was 34%, with Catholicism being the largest denomination at 31% of the population. Protestants and other Christians comprised 2% and Orthodox Christians comprised 1%. Islam is the second largest religion with 6% of the population being Muslim.

== Beliefs and practices ==
According to a 2010 Eurobarometer poll:

- 37% of Belgian citizens believe there is a god.
- 31% believe there is some sort of spirit or life force.
- 27% do not believe there is any sort of spirit, God, or life force.
- 5% declined to answer.

In a 2022 Gallup International Association poll, 32% said that they believed in God, while 42% said that they did not.

In a 2023 European Social Survey, most respondents (59%) reported never praying when not at a religious service. A minority of 14% said they prayed daily.

=== Chronological statistics ===
==== Eurel ====
Religious group	Population % 1981	Population % 2009
Christianity	74.5%	52.5%
Catholic Christianity	72.0%	50.0%
Protestant Christianity and other Christians	2.5%	2.5%
Islam	3.0%	5.0%
Judaism	0.4%	0.4%
Buddhism	–	0.3%
Atheism	2.5%	9.2%
Not religious	21.5%	32.6%

==== Eurobarometer ====
Religious group	Population % 2015	Population % 2018	Population % 2019	Population % 2021
Christianity	59%	63%	60%	49%
Catholic Christianity	51%	57%	54%	44%
Protestant Christianity and other Christians	6%	5%	5%	4%
Orthodox Christianity	2%	1%	1%	1%
Islam	5%	8%	5%	2%
Buddhism	–	–	–	1%
Other religions and unspecified including "Refusal to answer" and "Do not know"	5%	–	4%	7%
Atheism	14%	9%	10%	15%
Not religious	17%	20%	21%	26%

==== European Social Survey ====
The European Social Survey holds regular surveys to measure religious belonging in various countries. They use a two question approach. The first question asked is: "Do you consider yourself as belonging to any particular religion or denomination?". If this question is answered in the affirmative, the second question is "Which one?". The table is calculated by combining the answers to both questions.

Religious group	2002	2004	2006	2008	2010	2012	2014	2016	2018	2020	2023
No religion	50.2%	54%	56.2%	55.8%	57.8%	58.6%	58.8%	54.2%	53.8%	57.6%	58.7%
Christian	45.9%	41.3%	40.4%	38.9%	36.8%	33.9%	34.8%	37.2%	37%	35.1%	33.9%
Roman Catholic	43.9%	40%	38.8%	36.9%	34.3%	31.8%	31.6%	35.1%	33.6%	31.2%	31.1%
Protestant	0.6%	0.5%	0.6%	1%	1.1%	1.1%	0.9%	0.8%	1.4%	1.4%	1.3%
Eastern Orthodox	0.1%	0.2%	0.4%	0.4%	0.4%	0.7%	1.3%	0.8%	1.2%	1.7%	0.6%
Other Christian	1.3%	0.6%	0.6%	0.6%	1%	0.3%	1%	0.5%	0.8%	0.8%	0.9%
Islam	2.8%	3.9%	3.2%	4.1%	4.7%	6.5%	5.8%	7.4%	7.7%	7%	6.4%
Jewish	0.1%	0%	0.2%	0.1%	0.3%	0.2%	0%	0%	0.2%	0.2%	0.1%
Eastern religions	0.2%	0.5%	0.1%	0.4%	0.3%	0.4%	0.4%	0.5%	0.7%	0.2%	0.2%
Other	0.6%	0.3%	0%	0.6%	0.1%	0.5%	0.2%	0.6%	0.6%	0.2%	0.6%

=== Attendance at religious services ===
In 2023 most Belgians (59%) never attended religious services apart from special occasions such as weddings and funerals. Only 7% responded that they had taken part at least once a week.

== Government and religion ==
The Belgian constitution provides for freedom of religion, and the government generally respects this right in practice. However, government officials have the authority to research and monitor religious groups that are not officially recognised. There are a few reports of societal abuses or discrimination based on religious belief or practice, and some reports of discrimination against minority religious groups.

Belgian law officially recognizes many religions, including Catholicism, Protestantism, Anglicanism, Islam, Judaism, and Eastern Orthodoxy, as well as non-religious philosophical organizations (Dutch: vrijzinnige levensbeschouwelijke organisaties; French: organizations laïques). Buddhism is in the process of being recognized under the secular organization standard. Official recognition means that priests (called "counselors" within the secular organizations) receive a state stipend. Also, parents can choose any recognized denomination to provide religious education to their children if they attend a state school. Adherents to religions that are not officially recognized are not denied the right to practice their religion but do not receive state stipends.

After attaining autonomy from the federal government in religious matters, the Flemish Parliament passed a regional decree installing democratically elected church councils for all recognised religious denominations and making them subject to the same administrative rules as local government bodies, with important repercussions for financial accounting and open government. In 2006, however, Catholic bishops still appointed candidates to the Catholic Church councils because they had not decided on the criteria for eligibility; they were afraid that candidates might be merely baptized Catholics. By 2008, however, the bishops decided that candidates for the church councils had only to prove that they were over 18, a member of the parish church serving the town or village in which they lived, and baptized Catholic.

In 2022, the country was scored 3 out of 4 for religious freedom.

== Irreligious people ==
Religion has declined in Belgium, though Catholicism still remains large among the Belgian population. A 2018 report by Pew Research Centre showed that Belgium had 54% who "Do not Believe in God". In 2021, the Eurobarometer survey found that 41% of Belgians considered themselves irreligious: 26% of Belgians identified as non-believer or agnostic, while 15% identified as atheist.

== Religions ==
=== Christianity ===
==== Catholicism ====
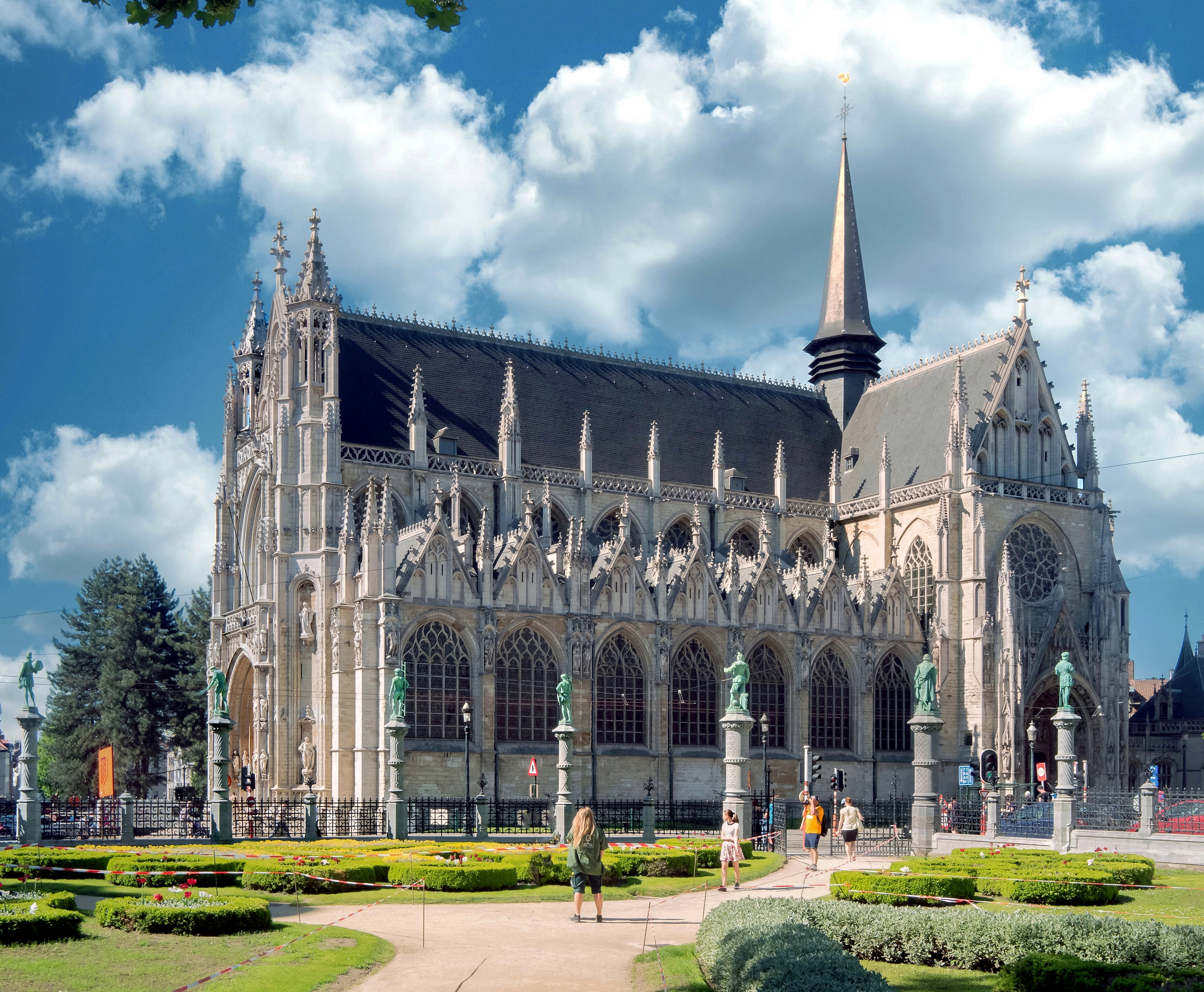
Church of Our Lady of Victories at the Sablon in Brussels

Catholicism has traditionally been Belgium's majority religion, with particular strength in Flanders. However, by 2009, Sunday church attendance was 5.4% in Flanders, down from 12.7% in 1998. Nationwide, Sunday church attendance was 5% in 2009, down from 11.2% in 1998.

Until 1998, the Catholic Church annually published key figures such as Sunday mass attendance and the number of baptized children. In 2006, it announced that mass attendance for the Christmas period was 11.5%, and weekly mass attendance (not only on Sundays) was 7%, for the Flanders region. Since 2000, Sunday church attendance in Flanders has dropped by an average of 0.5%–1% each year. In the years 2010 to 2016, 12,442 people in Flanders formally left the Catholic Church.

The “Catholic Church in Belgium 2023” report said that 50% of Belgium's population identified as Catholic in 2022 down from 53% in 2017 with 8.9% attending Mass at least once a month.

==== Protestantism ====
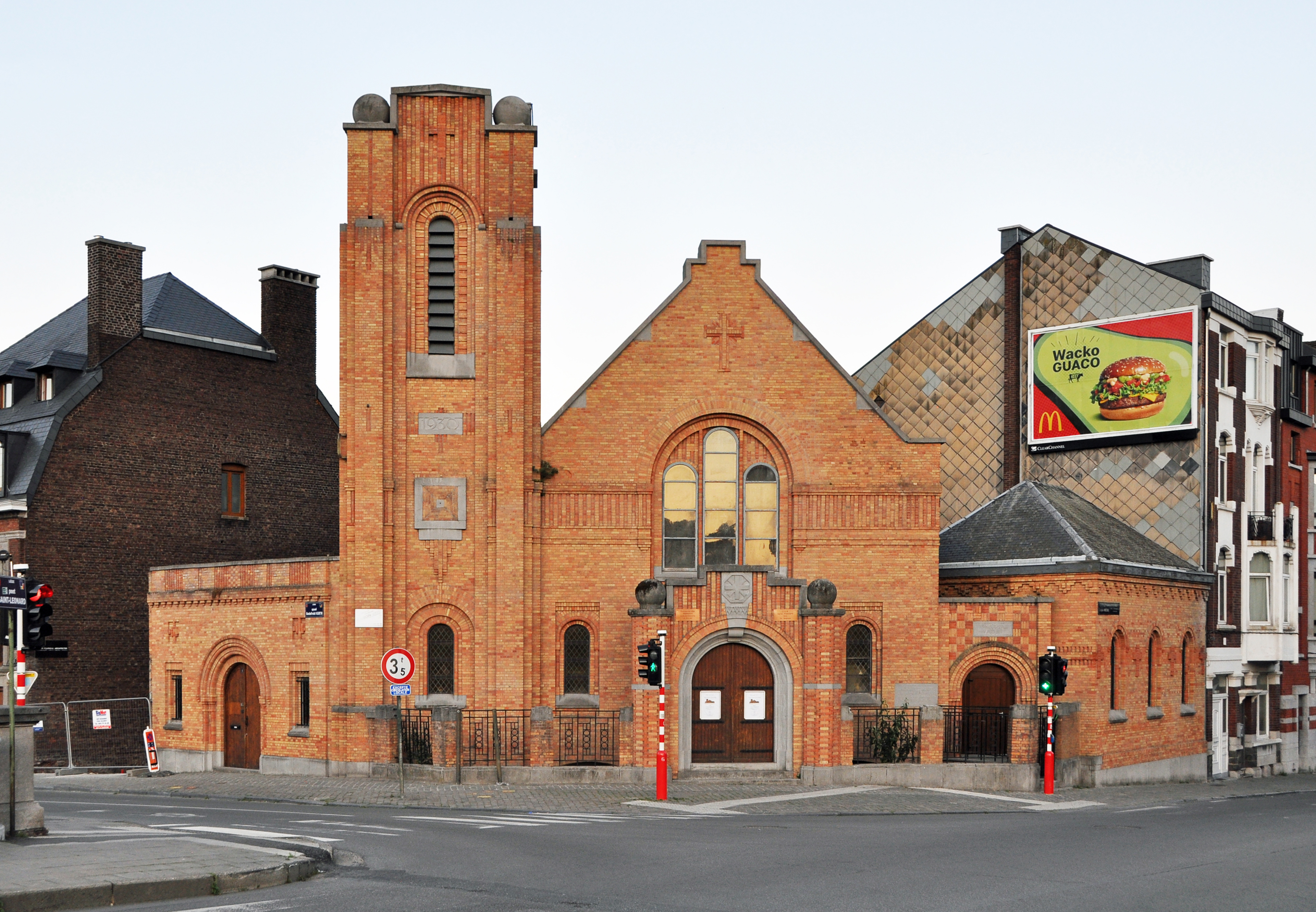
Church of Redemption, a 1930s Protestant church in Quai Godefroid Kurth, Liège

In 1566, at the peak of Belgian Reformation, there were an estimated 300,000 Protestants, or 20% of the Belgian population. The Spanish reconquest of the Southern Netherlands in the Eighty Years' War prompted most of the Belgian Protestants to flee to the north or convert, causing the region to again be overwhelmingly Catholic. As of 2017, Protestantism represented 4% of the total population, according to Pew Research.

The Administrative Council of Protestant and Evangelical Religion in Belgium is a coordinating group that mediates between many Protestant groups and the government. The largest Protestant denomination is the United Protestant Church in Belgium, with some 138 affiliated churches.

Belgium had thirteen Anglican churches as of 2012, including the pro-cathedral, Holy Trinity, Brussels. They are part of the Church of England's Diocese in Europe, and of the Convocation of Episcopal Churches in Europe.

==== Eastern Orthodoxy ====
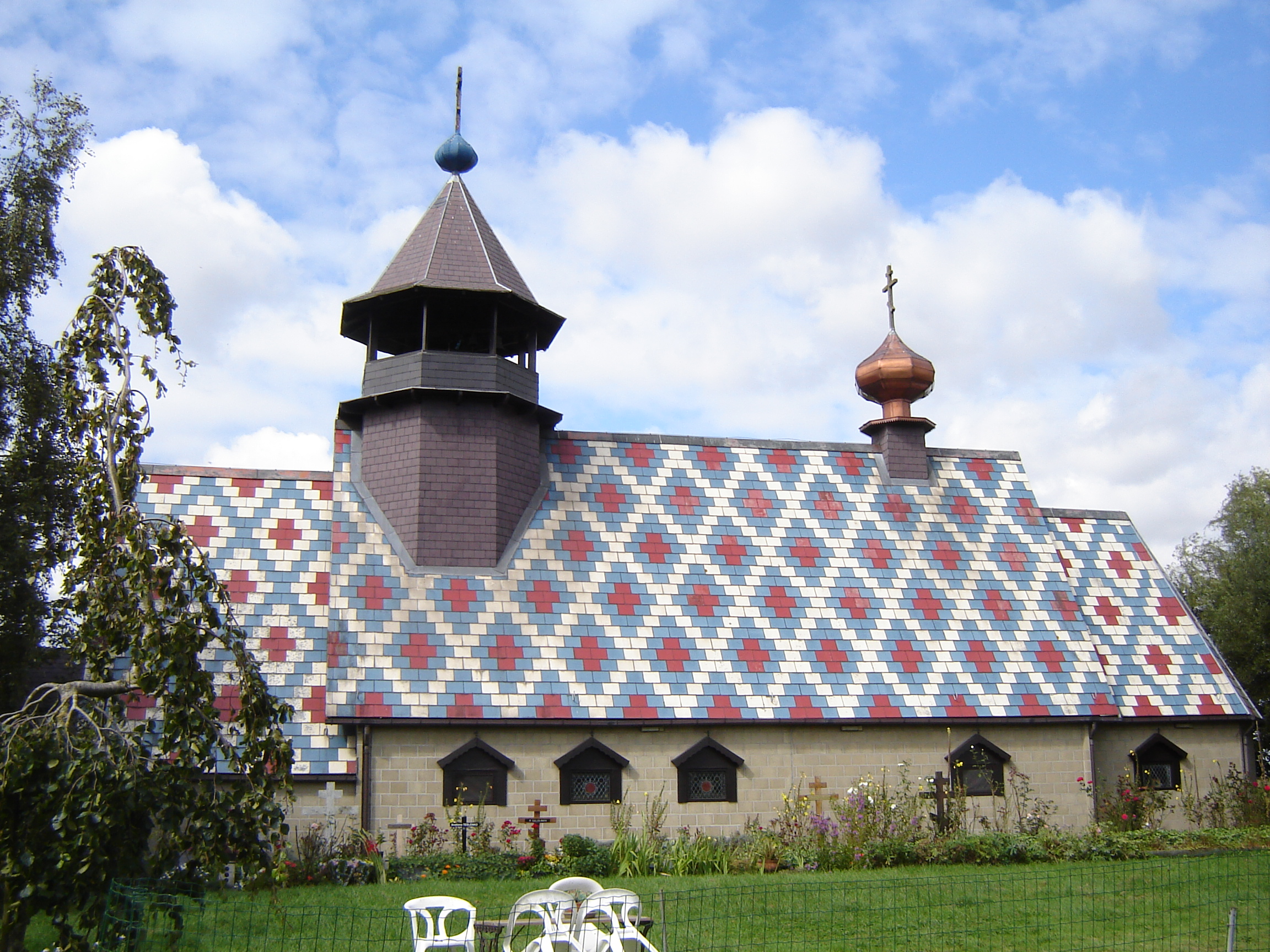
Russian Orthodox church in Lampernisse, Diksmuide

Eastern Orthodox Christians made up 1.6% of the total Belgian population in 2015. The region with the greatest proportion of Eastern Orthodox Christians was the Bruxelles-Capital Region, in which they formed 8.3% of the population. The Eastern Orthodox Church in Belgium is subdivided into several canonical jurisdictions: Russian, Ecumenical, Serbian, Romanian, and Bulgarian.

==== Oriental Orthodoxy ====
There are significant Armenian communities that reside in Belgium, many of them are descendants of traders who settled during the 19th century. Most Armenian Belgians are adherents of the Armenian Apostolic Church, with smaller numbers belonging to the Armenian Catholic Church or the Armenian Evangelical Church. These churches have not yet received official recognition.

==== Other Christians ====
The Church of Jesus Christ of Latter-day Saints has had a presence in Belgium as early as 1888. On 4 April 2021, church president Russell M. Nelson announce church's intent to construct the Brussels Belgium Temple, the church's first temple in Belgium. The groundbreaking for the temple occurred in 2025. There are an estimated 7000 members of the church in Belgium as of 2025.

=== Islam ===
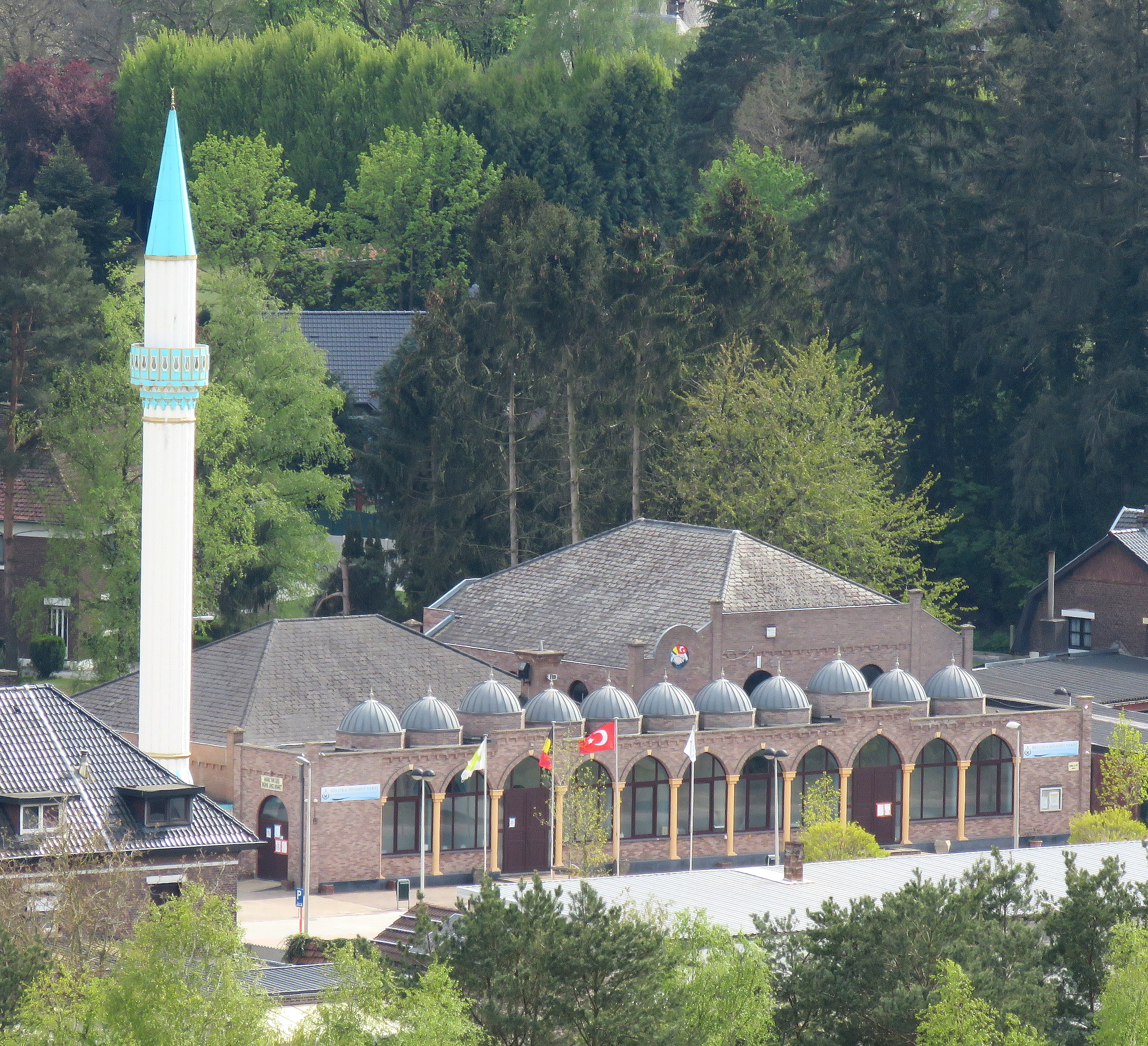
Mosque in Maasmechelen

In 2015, according to the Eurobarometer survey made by the European Commission, 5.2% of the total Belgian population was Muslim.

As of 2015, it was estimated that 7% of the Belgians (781,887) were Muslims, including 329,749 in Flanders (forming 5.1% of the region's population), 174,136 in Wallonia (4.9%), and 277,867 in Brussels (23.6%).

=== Judaism ===
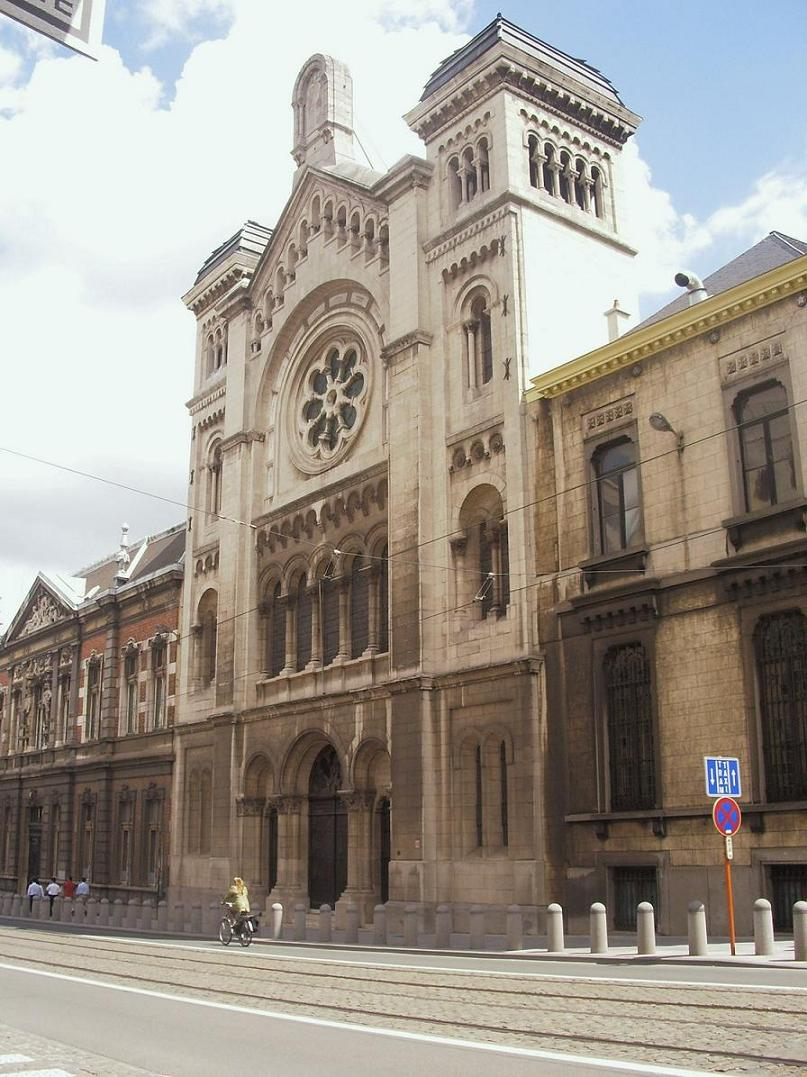
Great Synagogue of Europe in Brussels

There is a small but long-standing Jewish community concentrated in Antwerp.

=== Buddhism ===
Eurobarometer 2015 found only 0.2% of the total Belgian population declaring to be Buddhist. Despite that, one year later Ipsos found that 2% of the working-age, internet connected Belgians were Buddhists.

=== Confucianism ===
According to Ipsos, 1% of the working-age, internet-connected Belgians declared that they believed in Confucianism. This segment of the population may include many – if not all – the Chinese communities in Belgium.

=== Hinduism ===
Hinduism forms a negligible but growing minority in Belgium. In 2006, there were about 6,500 Hindus in the country. this increased to 7,901 Hindus in 2015 and 10,000 in 2020. The majority of Hindus in Belgium originate from Nepal, some come from diamond trading communities in India, and some are native converts, mostly of the ISKON movement. In 2023, Hindus in Belgium advocated for official state recognition as a religion in Belgium. Doing so would allow Hindu chaplains and priests to visit prisons and hospitals.

=== Antoinism ===
Antoinism is a Christian-inspired new religious movement which was created by Louis-Joseph Antoine (1846–1912). It remains the only significant such movement to originate in Belgium and has adherents in France and elsewhere.

=== Jainism ===
Jainism is an Indian religion which has around 2,000 adherents in Belgium (as of 2020), consisting mainly of Indian migrants who specialize in the diamond trade within Antwerp. The Shankheswar Parshvanath Jain temple, which is located in the Antwerpian municipality of Wilrijk, remains the only Jain temple within continental Europe.

== History ==
Southern part of the Low Countries with bishopry towns and abbeys, in about the 7th century

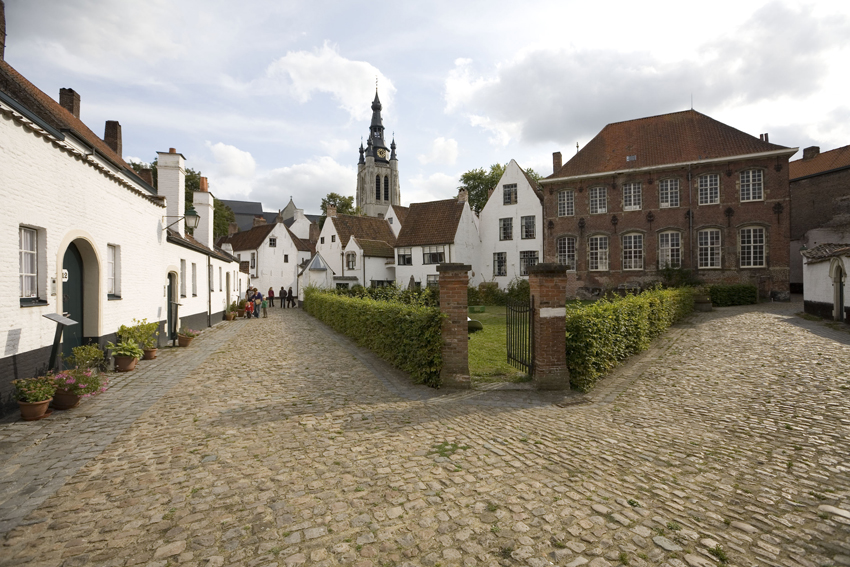
Beguinage of Kortrijk, where the last one of the Beguines, a medieval Christian lay, semi-monastic order, died in 2013

=== 6th–7th century: Christianisation ===
After the Roman period, Christianity was brought back to the southern Low Countries by missionary saints like Willibrord and Amandus. In the 7th century, abbeys were founded in remote places, and it was mainly from these abbeys that the Christianization process was started. This process was expanded under the auspices of the Merovingian dynasty, and later by Charlemagne, who even waged war to impose the new religion.

=== 17th–18th century: Catholicism as the state religion ===
From the Spanish military conquest of 1592 until the re-establishment of religious freedom in 1781 by the Patent of Toleration under Joseph II of Austria, Catholicism was the only religion allowed, on penalty of death, in the territories now forming Belgium. However, a small number of Protestant groups managed to survive at Maria-Horebeke, Dour, Tournai, Eupen, and Hodimont.

=== 19th–20th century ===
Religion was one of the differences between the almost solidly Catholic south and the predominantly Protestant north of the United Kingdom of the Netherlands, formed in 1815. The union broke up in 1830 when the south seceded to form the Kingdom of Belgium. In Belgium's first century, Catholicism was such a binding factor socially that it prevailed over the language divide (Dutch versus French). The decline in religion's importance as a social marker across late-20th-century Western Europe explains to a large extent the current centrifugal forces in Belgium, with language differences (increasingly reinforced by a positive feedback effect in the media) no longer being kept in check by a religious binding factor. If anything, the Catholic Church has acquiesced to these changes by having a Dutch-speaking university (Katholieke Universiteit Leuven) and a French-speaking university (Universite Catholique de Louvain).

Until the late 20th century, Catholicism played an important role in Belgian politics. One significant example was the so-called Schools' Wars (Dutch: schoolstrijd; French: guerres scolaires) between the country's philosophically left-wing parties (liberals at first, joined by Socialists later) and the Catholic party (later the Christian Democrats), which took place from 1879 to 1884 and from 1954 to 1958. Another important controversy happened in 1990, when the Catholic monarch, King Baudouin I, refused to ratify an abortion bill that had been approved by Parliament. The king asked Prime Minister Wilfried Martens and his government to find a solution, which proved novel. The government declared King Baudouin unfit to fulfill his constitutional duties as monarch for one day. Government ministers signed the bill in his place and then proceeded to reinstate the king after the abortion law had come into effect.

=== 21st century ===
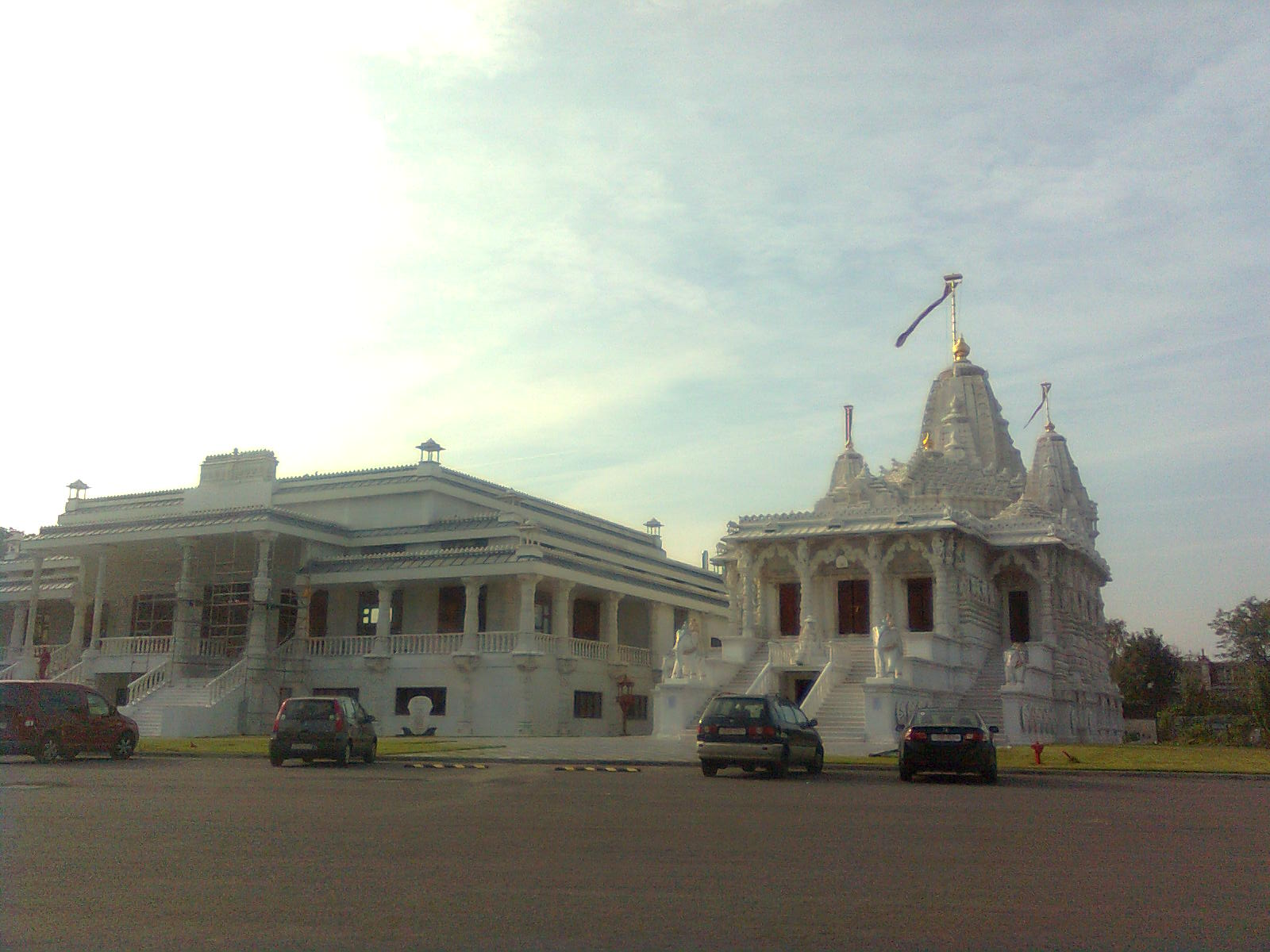
Jain temple of Antwerp

In 2002, the officially recognized Protestant denomination at the time, the United Protestant Church of Belgium (consisting of around 100 member churches, usually with a Calvinist or Methodist past) and the unsubsidized Federal Synod of Protestant and Evangelical Churches (which had 600 member churches in 2008 but did not include all Evangelical and Charismatic groups outside the Catholic tradition) together formed the Administrative Council of the Protestant and Evangelical Religion (ARPEE in Dutch, CACPE in French). The council is now the accepted mouthpiece of Protestantism in all three linguistic communities of Belgium: Dutch, French, and German.

The 21st century has witnessed significant changes in the religious demography of Belgium, characterized by a decline of Catholicism and the growth of irreligion and other religions, some of them brought by waves of immigration from foreign countries, including Pentecostalism, Orthodox Christianity, Islam, Hinduism, Buddhism and Chinese religions.

Apart from Islam, however, these groups are very small demographically, especially alongside the unaffiliated demographic of 37%.

== Recent changes in religious practice ==
In 2024, the Belgian Catholic Bishops’ Conference reported a slight increase in Sunday Mass attendance, with an average of 173,335 people attending on a “regular Sunday in October,” up from 167,360 in 2023.

The number of adult baptisms (catechumens) has also risen: from around 180 in 2015 to 362 in 2024, with 536 expected in 2025.

However, regular attendance remains low in comparison with earlier decades, and identity‐based affiliation (identifying as Catholic) continues to exceed levels of active participation.

=== Law and religious symbols ===
In May 2024 the European Court of Human Rights upheld the admissibility of Belgium's ban on visible religious symbols (including headscarves) in the Flemish Community's public school network, finding that a policy of state neutrality may justify general prohibitions when applied without discrimination.

Similarly, under Belgian law, public sector employers may enforce neutrality policies regarding visible religious symbols provided such rules are general, nondiscriminatory, and necessary to the functioning of the institution.

=== Discrimination and social experience ===
Data from the European Union Fundamental Rights Agency indicate a rising incidence of discrimination against Muslims in Belgium, particularly in employment and housing.

== See also ==
- History of religion in the Netherlands
- History of the Jews in Belgium
- Buddhism in Belgium
- Catholic Church in Belgium
- Hinduism in Belgium
- Islam in Belgium
- Irreligion in Belgium
- Jainism in Belgium
- Scientology in Belgium
- Sikhism in Belgium
