= Hinduism in Belgium =

Belgian Hindus

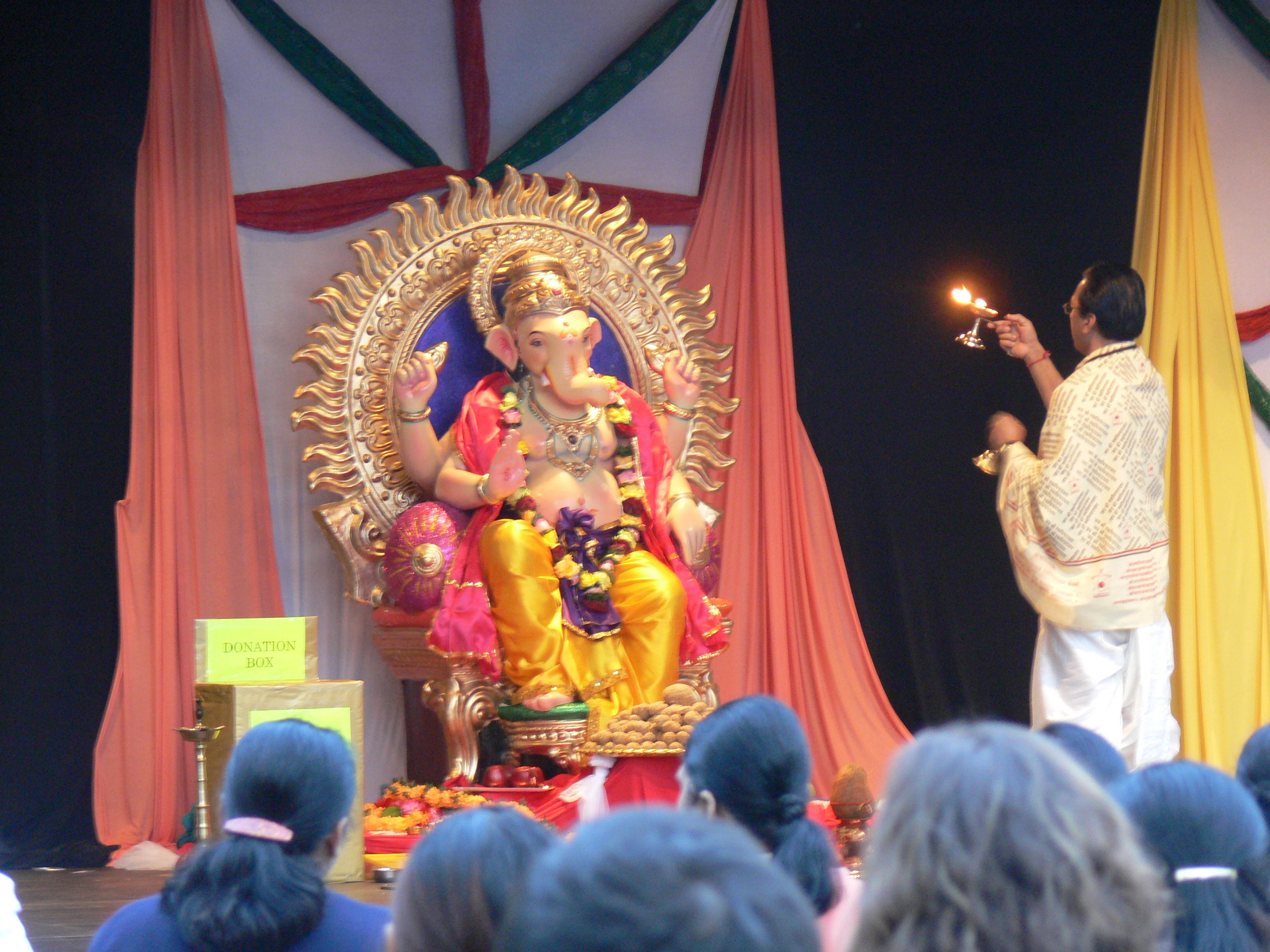
- Ganesh Chaturthi festival in Antwerp

Total population
- ▲10,000 (2020); 0.08% of total population

Religions
- Hinduism

Scriptures
- Bhagavad Gita & Vedas

Languages
- Sanskrit (Sacred); Hindi, Tamil, Telugu, Kannada, Malayalam, Bengali, Pashto, Dari, Sarnami, Nepali, Balinese, English · Dutch · French · German (Majority)

Hinduism in Belgium is practised by both immigrants from across Asia and native Belgians. Hinduism is not officially recognised in Belgium, although attempts have been made by the Hindu Forum of Belgium (HFB) to make Hinduism an officially-recognised religion in Belgium. Hinduism has existed in Belgium since the 1940s, through the influence of the Theosophical society in Europe as well as through the interest of the Queen of Belgium in the 1940s. As Hindu leaders travelled to Belgium and migration occurred, the number of Hindus in Belgium, both of diasporic and Belgium origin, increased. Many Hindu temples and organisations exist in Belgium.

== Demographics ==
Hindu population in Belgium
Year	Pop.	±%
2006	6,500	—
2015	7,901	+21.6%
2020	10,000	+26.6%

A survey conducted by universities across Belgium in 2001 reported that there were about 6,500 Hindus in the country. In 2015, the Association of Religion Data Archives reported that there were 7,901 Hindus in Belgium. In 2010 and 2020 the population of Hindus was less than 0.1% of the general population, according to Pew research data. In 2014, Hinduism was reported to be growing 'quickly' in Belgium. In 2023, the Hindu Forum of Belgium estimated the Hindu population to be 40,000 of which half are Western converts to Hinduism.

Hindus in Belgium have a variety of nationalities. Alongside people of Belgian origin, Hindus in Belgium come from Sri Lanka, South Africa, Nepal, Mauritius, Malaysia, Indonesia, Bangladesh and Afghanistan.

== History ==
Due to the influence of the Theosophical society in Europe, Hindu philosophy was introduced to Belgium in the late nineteenth century. The Belgian Theosophical society at the time had 500 members.

=== Influence of Yoga ===
Hinduism garnered royal interest when Queen Elisabeth began to practice yoga in the 1940s after the World War. Andrê Van Lysebeth, a Belgian yoga instructor referred to as the 'cobra man', introduced yoga to a wider audience in the 1960s.

=== 1970s Movements ===
In the 1970s, Osho gained a following in Belgium and an ashram was established in Leuven in 1974. The Transcendental Meditation movement became popular in Belgium in the 1970s. Its founder, Maharishi Mahesh Yogi, visited Belgium in 1972 and spread his teachings whilst residing in Knokke. The Flemish Transcendental Meditation society was established in 1972 in conjunction with this movement.

=== Migration ===
Hinduism expanded in Belgium through the process of migration. Hannelore Roos identifies three periods of South Asian migration in Belgium. The first period involved merchants that migrated along diamond trading routes established during the British colonial rule. These merchants were largely Jain, rather than Hindu, and settled in Antwerp in the 1960s.Their success attracted more Indian diamond merchants to migrate, including a lower socieconomic class of Hindus from Kathiawar and Jain and Hindu merchants from Rajasthan. By 2012, around 500 Indian families lived in Antwerp, of which 300 were Jain and 200 were Hindu. The second period of migration were political refugees that arrived in Belgium. In the 1970s Asians fled Idi Amin's government in Uganda and in the 1980s Sikhs fled violence in Punjab. The third most recent period of migration is the arrival of highly skilled Indian professionals in the 2000s. According to the National Informatics Centre in India, illegal immigrants from India work in Belgian farms and shops.

A distinct wave of later migration from Nepal occurred to in the coastal city of Ostend. A government amnesty programme regularised the migrants in 2009 and by 2012 there were around 150 Nepalese residents in Ostend.

== Temples and Organisations ==
Hindu temples and organisations in Belgium cater to both diaspora communities as well as western converts.

=== Temples ===
Brussels is home to the Brussels Mandir and the Ram Mandir. The Brussels mandir in Evere is managed by the Indian Cultural Centre, a non-profit organisation. Indian professionals regularly gathered informally in local schools and churches in the early 2000s. In 2012, through donations and fundraising, the organisation converted an office building into a mandir. Alongside traditional worship, yoga and classical Indian dance classes take place at the mandir. The Ram Mandir in Etterbeek was inaugurated in 2011. The murtis of Rama, Laksmana, Sita, Durga, and Lakshmi are housed in the mandir. The BAPS Swaminarayan mandir in Antwerp was inaugurated in 2003 in an 'inconscpicuous' building. Hindus meet regularly at the mandir on Sundays. The Govinda Vedic Cultural Centre is located in Gloriantlaan, Antwerp. Hindus also meet at the centre regularly on Sundays. The Hindu Temple Society established a temple in Ostend in 2004, worshipping Ravidas. Ico Maly, having conducted fieldwork in Ostend in 2014, states that the temple is located in a private house and mainly serves Nepali migrants. Hindu refugees from Afghanistan inaugurated the Asamai Mandir Belgium in 2013 in Kortrijk, converting a warehouse into a mandir. The Asamai Mandir Belgium association itself was founded in 2001 with the aim of bringing together Hindus from across West Flanders. A previously existing Shiva Temple in Oudenaarde was closed in October 2024.

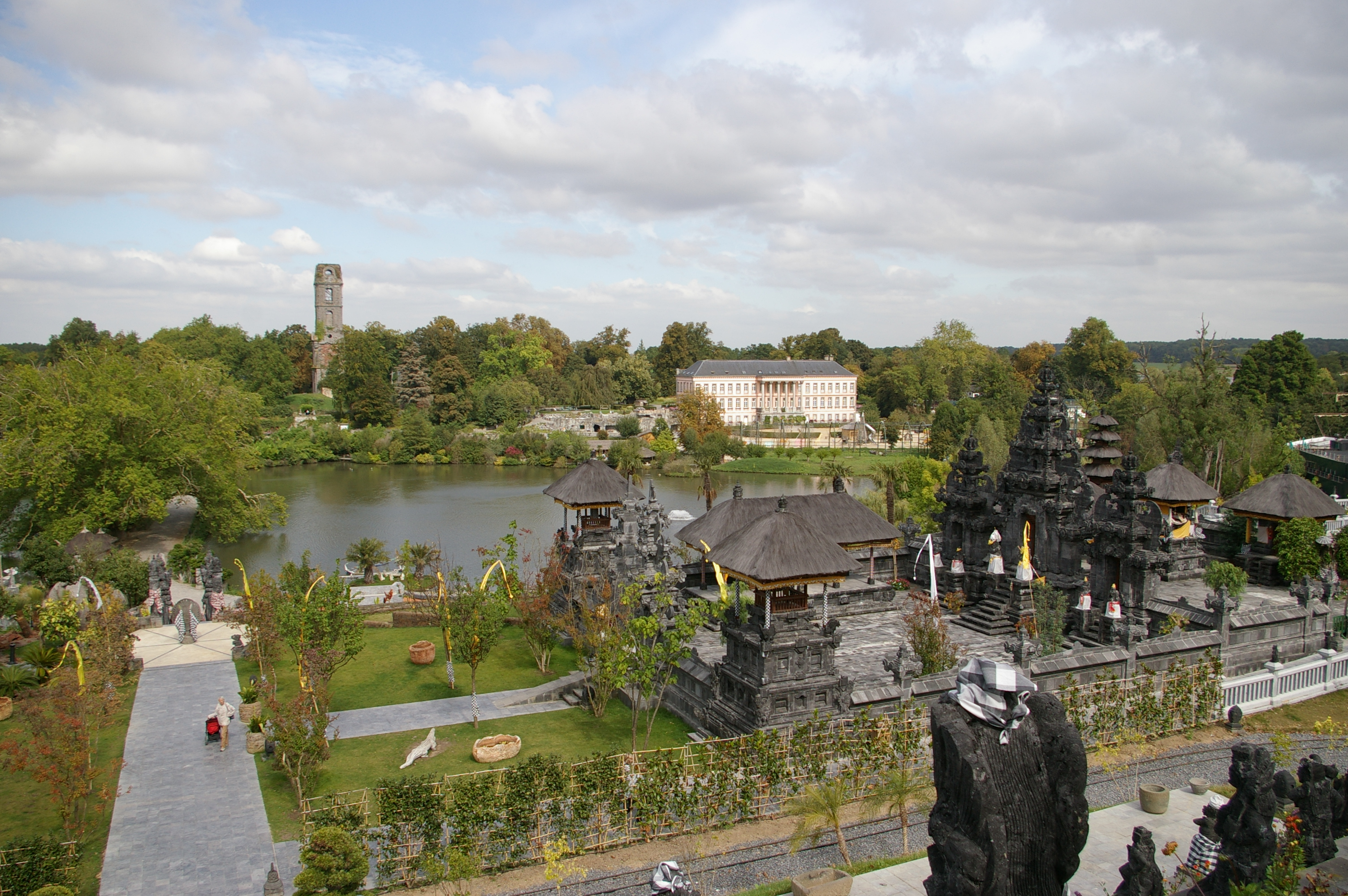
Kingdom of Ganesha

Two Balinese Temples exist in the Pairi Daiza botanical garden in Belgium. The 4-hectare (9.9-acre) Kingdom of Ganesha, which was opened in 2009, is the largest Indonesian garden in Europe, and reproduces the plant life and feel of the Indonesian archipelago, particularly Bali. Its collections include Pura Agung Shanti Buwana Balinese Hindu temple, East Nusa Tenggara and Toraja traditional houses and miniature replicas of Borobudur and Prambanan temples. In August 2009 the Indonesian government has sent a pair of Sumatran elephants to enliven the Indonesian Park. It is the first endangered animal breeding loan program that Indonesia ever had in Europe.

=== Organisations ===
Some Hindu organisations hold religious and cultural events. The Brussels Puja Committee hosts multicultural Hindu events. It was founded in 1994 by Indian, Bengali and Nepali students at Vrije Universiteit Brussels to celebrate Saraswati Puja and has since grown. The committee has members that originate from 'Afghanistan, Bangladesh, Belgium, India, Indonesia, Mauritius, Nepal [and] Sri Lanka'. The Sarbajanin Puja Samity Belgium (SPSB) in Anderlecht hosts Bengali Hindu events such as Durga Puja, Kali Puja, Saraswati Puja and Rabindra Jayanti. The organisation brings together Bengali Hindus of Indian and Bangladeshi origin. Two Nepali Hindu organisations exist in Belgium, the Sanatan Dharm Seva Parisad and the Jayatu Sanskritam association. Both were established in 2008. The Hindu Forum of Belgium (HFB or FHB) was created by Hindu organisations in Belgium. It was launched on 16 March 2007 in Brussels.

The International Society for Krishna Consciousness (ISKCON), a Gaudiya Vaishnava movement, has been active in Belgium since the 1970s. The organisation's main centre is Radhadesh in Septon-Durbuy in the Ardennes. Enrico Castro Montes and Idsebald Goddeeris note that the site was procured at the end of 1979, and Johan Leman and Hannelore Roos state that the organisation officially moved to the Radhadesh site in 1981. All four scholars concur that the site was officially named 'Radhadesh' and provided non-profit status in 1980. Bhaktivedanta College, founded in 2002, is a Hindu university run by ISKCON at the Radhadesh site. Since 1998, the organisation distributes weekly free vegetarian meals in Liège. Unlike other Hindu organisations in Beligum, ISKCON's membership is mainly made up of western converts rather than Hindus of South Asian origin.

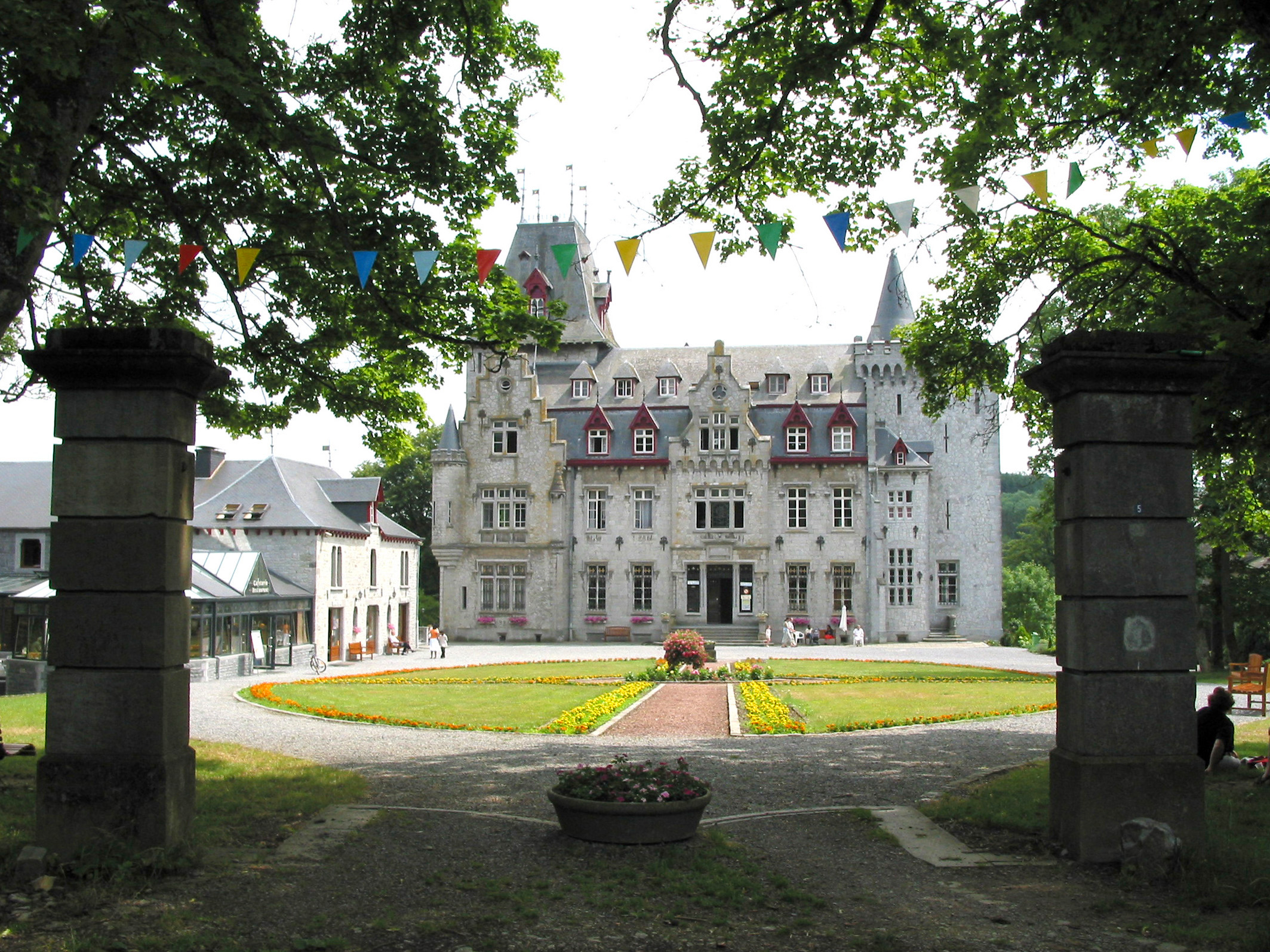
Bhaktivedanta College, the only Hindu Vaishnava university in Belgium

== Festivals ==
Every year, since 2006, the Sarbajanin Puja Samity commissions a murti of Durga to be made in Kumortuli, Kolkata and has it flown to Belgium for the annual Durga Puja celebrations. The Durga Puja celebrations last for five days and the festival ends with the immersion of the murti in water. The Brussels Puja Committee has hosted Saraswati Puja since 1994 as well the Bengali New Year celebrations. The Ganesh Chaturthi festival is celebrated annually in Antwerp, since 2007 by the BAPS Swaminarayan community in conjunction with the local government. A murti of Ganesha is transported from Mumbai each year and carried in a procession, with music and dancing. At the end of the festival the murti is immersed in the river Scheldt and prasada is distributed. Hannelore Roos notes that the festival demonstrates the diaspora's cultural heritage to Antwerp and creates opportunities for engagement with non-Indian residents of the city. The Rath Yatra festival in Antwerp is organised annually by ISKCON with the sponsorship of Indian companies in Belgium. In addition, ISKCON conduct musical street processions across Belgium. Holi and Diwali are celebrated annually by various organisations. The Brussels Mandir hosts an annual Holi celebration open to non-Hindus. The Antwerp Indian Association, founded in 1979, regularly celebrates Diwali and Holi. The Indian Students Association of Leuven, founded in 1972, also celebrate Holi and Diwali, extending their invitations to Indians beyond the Hindu community. The Hindu Forum of Belgium have organised Diwali events at the European Parliament since 2012.

== State Recognition ==
In 2013, the Hindu Forum placed an application for official recognition of Hinduism as a religion by the state. In 2022, a subsidy grant was awarded to the Belgian Hindu community, an initial step towards official recognition. The Belgian government provides state funding for officially recognised religions. That year 281.7 million Euros were awarded to officially recognised religions, out of which 41,500 Euros was granted to the Belgian Hindu community for use in 2023. This amount is said to double annually.

=== Community Recognition ===
The reception of Hindus in Belgium is mixed. According to an Ipsos survey conducted in 2018, about 40% of the participants considers Hindus as real Belgians and about 35% stated that Hindus are not true Belgians. Hannelore Roos' ethnographic research on Hindus in Belgium records non-Hindu Belgian nationals having a positive view towards Hindus in Belgium. One person interviewed stated, "I have seen the city changing. The Indian community is part of the population in Antwerp, so why shouldn't they celebrate their cultural traditions and folklore here in public?"

== See also ==
- Jainism in Belgium
- Sikhism in Belgium
- Buddhism in Belgium
- Hinduism in Austria
- Hinduism in the Netherlands
- Hinduism in Germany
- Hinduism in Luxembourg
