= Centre d'action laïque =

- Abbreviation: CAL
- Formation: 29 March 1969
- Type: Nonprofit organisation
- Purpose: Promoting secularism
- Headquarters: Brussels
- Region served: French-speaking Belgium
- President: Henri Bartholomeeusen
- Website: laicite.be

The Centre d'action laïque (CAL; English: Centre for Secular Action) is the umbrella organisation of numerous secularist associations in French-speaking Belgium since 1969. It is integrated in the Central Secular Council (Conseil central laïque), which also coordinates deMens.nu (formerly UVV) in Flanders.

== Philosophical principles ==
The CAL asserts that a secular state or system treats all citizens according to the same standard, or confers on them the same rights and duties, regardless of their religion and their philosophical convictions.

In French-speaking Belgium, the term laïcité ("secularity" or "secularism") is both used for designating the secular movement that groups associations and individuals who, besides their struggle in favour of the secularity of the state, share a conception of life free of any reference to the supernatural. Alongside the traditional faith communities, the Belgian state recognises and finances the nonreligious community. The laïcité concept supports universality, equality and non-discrimination between human beings.

The laïques ("secularists") are working to ensure that the state, its laws and organisation defends these values. This idea of secularism as the basis of common values is one of the democratic principles that govern modern states. It relies in particular on the principles expressed in the Universal Declaration of Human Rights.

== Activities ==
The Centre d'Action Laïque (CAL) is an association without lucrative purpose (asbl) founded on 29 March 1969. It assures the defence and promotion of secularism in French-speaking Belgium.

Through its various regional and local entities, the CAL is involved in urban life. It thinks about, debates and acts on all aspects of life and society: gender equality, education, the beginning and end of life, interculturalism, incarceration, addiction, freedom... Its principles are solidarity and the promoting of critical thinking.

== Organisation ==
The CAL federates 7 regional branches and coordinates 28 secularist associations. The CAL's regional branches are organised by province, with the exception of Hainaut that has two (Mons and Charleroi) and Brussels (which is not a province). Each local establishment chooses privileged areas of application and defines its organisation according to its environment, its audiences and goals to achieve.

The CAL's Flemish equivalent is deMens.nu. Together, they constitute the Conseil Central Laïque/Centrale Vrijzinnige Raad (CCL/CVR, "Central Secular Council/Central Freethought Council"), the representative organ of the nonreligious community of Belgium.

On European level, the Centre d'Action Laïque is member of the European Humanist Federation (EHF). On global level, it is member of the International Humanist and Ethical Union (IHEU).

== Publications ==
The Centre d'Action Laïque publishes the monthly magazine Espace de libertés ("Space of Liberties"), Outils de réflexion ("Tools for thought"), the collection of essays Liberté, j'écris ton nom ("Freedom, I write your name") and various works including Découvrir la laïcité ("Discovering Secularism"). It also produces video broadcastings Libres, ensemble ("Free, together").

== Presidents ==
- 1972–1975: Paul Backeljauw
- 1975–1983: Georges Liénard
- 1983–1987: Jean Michot
- 1987–2006: Philippe Grollet
- 2006–2014: Pierre Galand
- 2014–present: Henri Bartholomeeusen

== See also ==
- Comité Para
- Het Denkgelag
- Irreligion in Belgium
- Organized secularism
- SKEPP
- Université libre de Bruxelles
- List of secularist organizations
