= Secularization (disambiguation) =

Secularization or secularisation may refer to:

- Secularization (church property), seizure of church property by a state
  - Secularization of monastic estates in Romania
- Secularization movement in the Philippines
- Secularization of Christmas
- Secularization of knowledge, separating knowledge from religion
- Secularization, the sociological process of religion declining in cultural significance

== See also ==
- Secular (disambiguation)
