= The Church of Jesus Christ of Latter-day Saints in Belgium =

- Area: Europe Central
- Members: 7,164 (2025)
- Stakes: 2
- Wards: 9
- Branches: 5
- Total congregations: 14
- Temples: 1 under construction
- FamilySearch Centers: 8

The Church of Jesus Christ of Latter-day Saints in Belgium refers to the Church of Jesus Christ of Latter-day Saints and its members in Belgium. Most of the growth of the church in Belgium occurred during the 1960s and 1970s. This growth has since slowed.

Membership in Belgium
Year	Membership
1930	339
1940	264
1950	459
1960	540
1970	2,667
1979	4,347
1989*	4,400
1999	5,771
2009	5,980
2019	6,605
2025	7,164
*Membership was published as a rounded number. Source: Wendall J. Ashton; Jim M. Wall, Deseret News, various years, Church Almanac Country Information: Belgium

== History ==
The first known member to come to Belgium is Mischa Markow, a Hungarian native who was converted in Turkey, who visited in 1888. He preached and baptized Belgium's first know converts, Henreite Esselman and her son, Fredrick Esselman on October 17, 1888. Other members of their family were baptized later. A branch in Antwerp was formed in January 1891. Belgium was added to the Netherlands Mission that same year. Proselyting ceased during World War I and only a few scattered members lived in Belgium in 1930. Elder Charles Didier of the Presidency of the Seventy noted that when he and his family first attended an LDS Church service in the 1950s, there were fewer than 15 members in the congregation, five of whom were members of his family.

Three missionaries were injured during the 2016 Brussels bombings.

== Stakes and congregations ==
Stake Centers in Belgium

As of September 2026, the following stakes and congregations exist in Belgium:

Brussels Belgium North Stake (Flanders)

- Antwerpen 1st Ward
- Brussels Grimbergen Ward
- Gent Ward
- Hasselt Branch
- Roeselare Ward
- St Niklaas Ward
- Antwerpen 2nd Branch (Spanish)
- Heerlen Military Ward (Military)

Brussels Belgium Stake (Brussels and Wallonia)

- Charleroi 2nd Ward
- Charleroi 1st Branch
- Liège Ward
- Namur Ward
- Nivelles Ward
- Brussels Central Ward (French)
- Ixelles Branch (Spanish)
- Shape Branch (English)

== Missions ==
The Franco Belgian Mission was created in 1963 as a division of the French Mission. The name was changed to the France Belgium on June 10, 1970 then The Belgium Brussels Mission on June 20, 1974. A second Belgium mission, Belgium Antwerp Mission existed, from 1975 to 1982, and from 1990 to 1995. In 2002, the Belgium Brussels mission was renamed Belgium Brussels/Netherlands Mission, and in 2010 was renamed to Belgium/Netherlands Mission with the southern portion going to the France Paris Mission.

Belgium is currently split between the church's Belgium/Netherlands Mission (north) and the church's France Paris France North Mission (south).

== Temples ==
On April 4, 2021, the intent to construct the Brussels Belgium Temple was announced by church president Russell M. Nelson.

273. Brussels Belgium Temple (Under construction); Official website; News & images	
Location: Announced: Groundbreaking: Size:	Brussels, Belgium; 4 April 2021 by Russell M. Nelson; 22 November 2025 by Jack N. Gerard; 25,500 sq ft (2,370 m^{2}) on a 0.3-acre (0.12 ha) site

== See also ==
- Religion in Belgium
