= Central Secular Council =

The Central Secular Council (Dutch: Centrale Vrijzinnige Raad (CVR), full name Centrale Vrijzinnige Raad der niet-confessionele levensbeschouwelijke Gemeenschappen van België vzw; French: Conseil central laïque (CCL), full name Conseil central des communautés philosophiques non confessionnelles a.s.b.l.) is the highest body of nonreligious organisations in Belgium. It federates the French-speaking Centre d'Action Laïque (CAL) and the Dutch-speaking Unie Vrijzinnige Verenigingen (UVV or deMens.nu). It was founded on 21 June 1972.

The Central Secular Council

- represents the nonreligious communities in their relations with the civil government;
- coordinates the organisation and working of the nonreligious moral services, and management of the material and financial interests of the nonreligious communities it comprises;
- regulates the functioning of the office of representatives who provide moral services based on a nonreligious worldview, and their appointment with regard to the state.
