= Hinduism in Luxembourg =

Hindus in Luxembourg
Regions with significant populations
- Luxembourg City, Howald

Hinduism is a minority faith in Luxembourg practised mainly by the Indian community.

== Hindu Forum Luxembourg ==
Hindu Forum Luxembourg (HFL) is the major Hindu organisation in the country. It has 21 founder-trustees. Its an umbrella organisation for Hindus as well as those who love Hinduism, regardless of country of origin and religion. It is part of the Hindu Forum of Europe. It was founded in September 2017 by Hindus from members India, Nepal, Mauritius, Sri Lanka and Germany. One of the main objectives of the organisation is to build Shiva Vishnu Hindu Temple in Luxembourg or in Germany near Luxembourg's border. According to Ambi Venkataraman, president of HFL, the temple-building project is ongoing, but delayed due to the COVID-19 pandemic. The temple would be a hub for religious and cultural practice.

== Temple ==
A Hindu center was formed in 2018 in the Beggen district by HFL. The HFL is also planning to build a temple. The Mata Amritanandamayi centre and Sahaja Yoga centre is also present.

== Demographics ==
The Hindu community is mainly concentrated in Luxembourg City and Howald.

The official Hindu population is not available as the Luxembourgish government does not collect statistics on religious affiliation. The Indian population in the country is 5,700 people in 2024 and the Nepali population is 450, the majority of whom are presumed to be Hindu. According to the Pew Research 2025, the Hindu population is less than 1% in the country. The ARDA estimated the Hindu population to be 283 in 2015, and the Nation Master estimated it to be 336 in 2011.

== Community Life ==
According to the 2013 Survey by TNS Ilres for the question: 'Which religion do you know thoroughly?' only 6% said Hinduism, which is one of the lowest compared to other minority religions like Islam (22%), Buddhism (15%) and Judaism (14%).

Hindu festivals like Holi, Diwali, Krishna Janmashtami, Durga Puja are celebrated.

== See also ==
- Religion in Luxembourg
- Hinduism in Belgium
- Hinduism in Germany
