= Irreligion in Belgium =

Religion in Belgium (2023)
1. No religion (59%)
2. Roman Catholic (31%)
3. Protestant (1%)
4. Eastern Orthodox (1%)
5. Other Christian (1%)
6. Islam (6%)
7. Other (1%)

Irreligion in Belgium pertains to citizens of Belgium that are atheist, agnostic, or otherwise unaffiliated with any religion. Most inhabitants of Belgium are irreligious. The largest religion remains Catholicism.

== History ==
The Constitution of Belgium guaranteed the right to freedom of religion when it was enacted in 1831. Articles 19-21 provide for protections of secularism: the Constitution of Belgium guarantees the freedom of worship and its public practice, forbids the obligation of any religious practices, and disallows government intervention or involvement in a religion's leadership.

The First School War was a dispute between Catholicism and secularism in schools in the 1880s. The dispute was revived in the Second School War in the 1950s.

== Demographics ==
Religion has declined in Belgium, though Catholicism still remains large among the Belgian population. A 2018 report by Pew Research Centre showed that Belgium had 54% who "Do not Believe in God". In 2021, the Eurobarometer survey found that 41% of Belgians considered themselves irreligious: 26% of Belgians identified as non-believer or agnostic, while 15% identified as atheist.

== Secular groups ==
Due to pillarization which is in place in Belgium, irreligious individuals and families who desire to receive counseling and celebration for life moments often go to institutions of organized secularism, including secular organizations or liberal philosophical organizations (Dutch: vrijzinnige levensbeschouwelijke organisaties, French: organisations laïques) which are headed and led by clergy-like officials known as "counsellors".

Organized secularism is recognized by Belgium as a philosophy that exists alongside religious groups and receives state funding.

== See also ==
- Demographics of Belgium
- Freedom of religion in Belgium
- Irreligion in France
- Irreligion in Germany
- Irreligion in Luxembourg
- Irreligion in the Netherlands
- Religion in Belgium
