= Secular (disambiguation) =

Secular is an adjective describing something separate from religion.

Secular may also refer to:

== Aperiodic ==
- Secular basis, a long-term financial basis
- Secular equilibrium, a situation in which the quantity of a radioactive isotope remains constant
- Secular Games, an ancient Roman religious celebration, held irregularly
- Secular_stagnation, a condition of little or low economic growth
- Secular variation, the long-term non-periodic variation of a time series
- Secular phenomena, non-periodic astronomical perturbations

== Separate from religion ==
- Secular clergy, clergy who are not monks
- Secular state, legal status of countries in relation to religion
- Secular education, public education in countries with a secular government
- Secular humanism, philosophy of being moral and ethical without religious belief
- Secular institute, a Catholic organization of individuals who are consecrated persons while living in the world
- Organized secularism, moral support for non-confessional citizens in Belgium
- Mexican secularization act of 1833

== See also ==
- Secularism
- Secularization
