= Buddhism in Belgium =

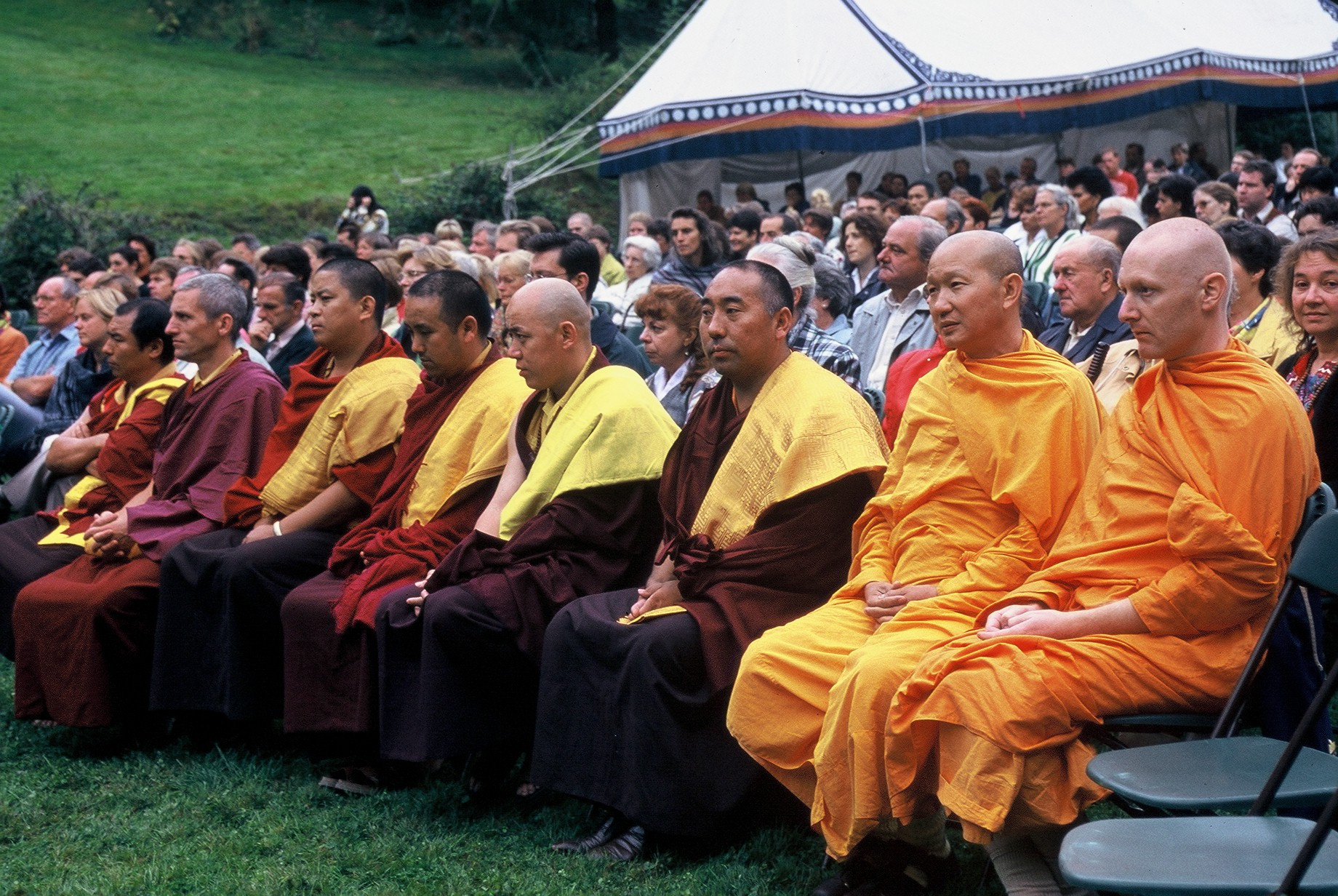
Meeting of Belgian Buddhist representatives at Yeunten Ling Tibetan Institute, Huy on 3 September 1997

Buddhism is a small religion in Belgium but despite lack of official recognition by the Belgian government has grown rapidly in recent years. In a 1997 estimate, 29,497 Belgian people identified their religion as Buddhist (about 0.29% of the total population).

== Buddhism in Belgium before official recognition ==
Belgium has been comparatively slow in the absorption of Buddhism compared with other countries in Europe because there were no Buddhist countries amongst the territories colonized by Belgium. Alexandra David-Néel introduced the Maha Bodhi Society to the Congress of Free Thinkers in Brussels as early as 1910. There was reportedly a group of those interested in Buddhism who met in Brussels in the period between the Wars. Buddhism had already come to the attention of Belgians academically through the works and translations of the two famous Indologists Louis de La Vallée Poussin at the Ghent University and his disciple Étienne Lamotte at the Catholic University of Louvain, founders of what is internationally known as the Belgian School of Buddhist studies, still now active in Ghent (with the Ghent Centre for Buddhist Studies of the UGent) and Louvain-la-Neuve (at the Institut orientaliste de l'Université catholique de Louvain). There was also for a while in Brussels an Institut Belge des Hautes Etudes Bouddhiques where several Belgian scholars (Jean Dantinne, José Van den Broeck, Charles Willemen) published translations of Buddhist texts between 1969 and 1980.

Belgium has remained wary of new religions (even though in many cases they are historically much older than Christianity) and the general attitude has been illustrated by the Government publication of a blacklist of 189 organizations (including two Buddhist ones) in its ‘witchhunt’ for sects of 1997 and in the ongoing attitudes especially in the French-speaking community of Belgium. Nonetheless, in 1999 there were about thirty active Buddhist organizations and centres in Belgium, representing all traditions of Buddhism. A Buddhist Union of Belgium was set up in 1997 bringing together the various centres of Buddhism in Belgium that had been established through charitable and private organizations. The 2001 census estimated that there were 10,000 Buddhists of Belgian nationality - however, the numbers of Buddhists in the immigrant population alone exceeded 20,000.

== Hope for Buddhism attaining official recognition in Belgium ==
The government was first approached on 10 June 2005 to grant official recognition for Buddhism - a process which is expected to be completed in 2008. Independent sources now estimate the numbers of Buddhists in Belgium at 29,467.

== Institutes ==
- Tibetaans Instituut, Schoten
  - Naropa Instituut, Cadzand
  - Nalanda Instituut, Brussels
  - Yeunten Ling, Huy
- Zangdok Palri Institute, Florennes

== Literature ==
- Bouddhismes en Belgique by Bernard De Backer. Courrier hebdomadaire, n°1768-1769, CRISP, Bruxelles, 2002, pp. 5–70
