= Scientology in Belgium =

Scientology has operated in Belgium since 1972. In 2003, Scientology opened an international office near the European Union headquarters to lobby for recognition as an official religious group.

== Investigation ==
=== Background ===
Belgium only officially recognizes six religions: Roman Catholicism, Protestantism, Anglicanism, the Eastern Orthodox Church, Judaism and Islam.

A parliamentary commission engaged to "recommend a policy to deal with the potential dangers that sects may represent to society", published its report in 1997, attaching a list of 189 organizations mentioned during testimony but not specifically characterize as harmful—Parliament adopted the report's recommendations, but not the attached list of sects.

After allegations of fraud, forgery and tax evasion, and former Scientologists reporting they had been subjected to intimidation and extortion, Belgian authorities began investigating the practices and finances of the Church of Scientology in Belgium.

In 2001, the Church of Scientology sued over the report and alleged "that its reputation [had] been sullied".

=== 2007 trial proposal ===
Concluding the ten-year investigation, on September 4, 2007, a Belgian prosecutor recommended that 12 individuals associated with Scientology and two legal entities – the Belgian Church of Scientology and Scientology's Office of Human Rights – should be prosecuted on counts of extortion, fraud, organized crime, obstruction of medical practice, illegal medical practice, invasion of privacy, conspiracy and commercial infractions like abusive contractual clauses. An administrative court would decide if the case would go ahead and charges would be pressed. The court's decision was expected to be announced within a few months.

The U.S. State Department has criticized several European countries "for labeling Scientology as a cult or sect and enacting laws to restrict its operations", and their comment on the Belgium case was "If Belgian authorities have evidence that individuals violated Belgian law, they should take appropriate legal steps, consistent with Belgium's international obligations to protect freedom of thought, conscience, and religion. [The US] would, however, oppose any effort to stigmatize an entire group based solely upon religious beliefs and would be concerned over infringement of any individual's rights because of religious affiliation."

=== 2015 trial ===
In October 2015, a criminal trial started against twelve leaders of Scientology in Belgium. Charges against them were bribery, extortion, fraud, violation of the privacy and unlicensed practicing of medicine.

=== Acquittal ===
In March 2016, the Church of Scientology was acquitted of all charges, and demands to close its Belgian branch and European headquarters were dismissed. The presiding judge, Yves Regimont, criticized the investigators and prosecutors, "The entire proceedings are declared inadmissible for a serious and irremediable breach of the right to a fair trial. The defendants were prosecuted primarily because they were Scientologists". The case was not appealed.

== See also ==
- Scientology status by country
- Scientology and law
