= Yeunten Ling =

Coordinates: 50.5160°N 5.2662°E

Yeunten Ling is a Tibetan Buddhist institute in Huy in the province of Liège in Belgium. It is one of the largest Buddhist Dharma centres in Europe. The centre is part of the Tibetan Institute.

The name of the centre means the "Garden of Qualities" and was given by Kalu Rinpoche, a Rinpoche who founded several centres in Europe. The centre focuses on intensive courses and retreats.

== Gallery ==
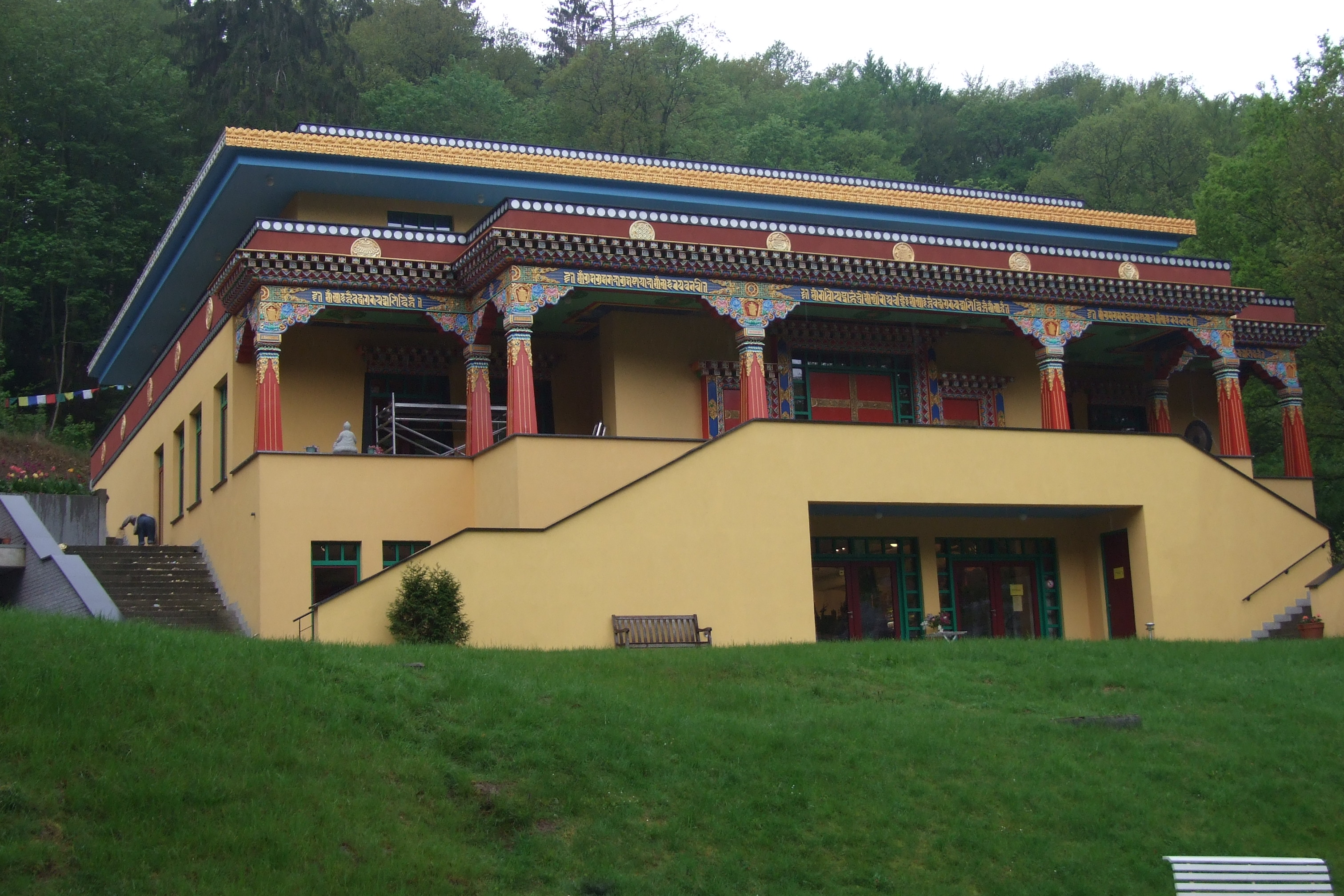

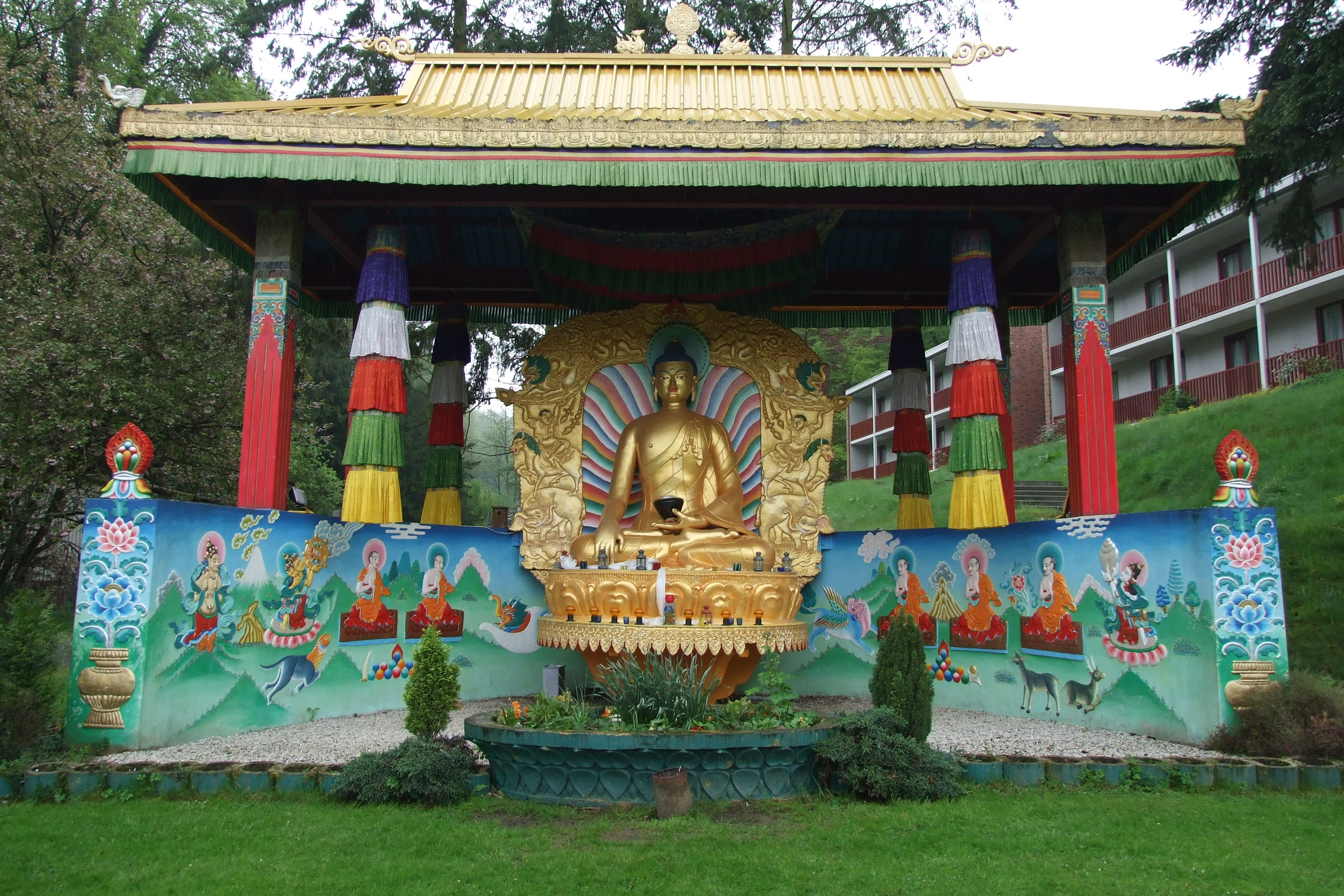

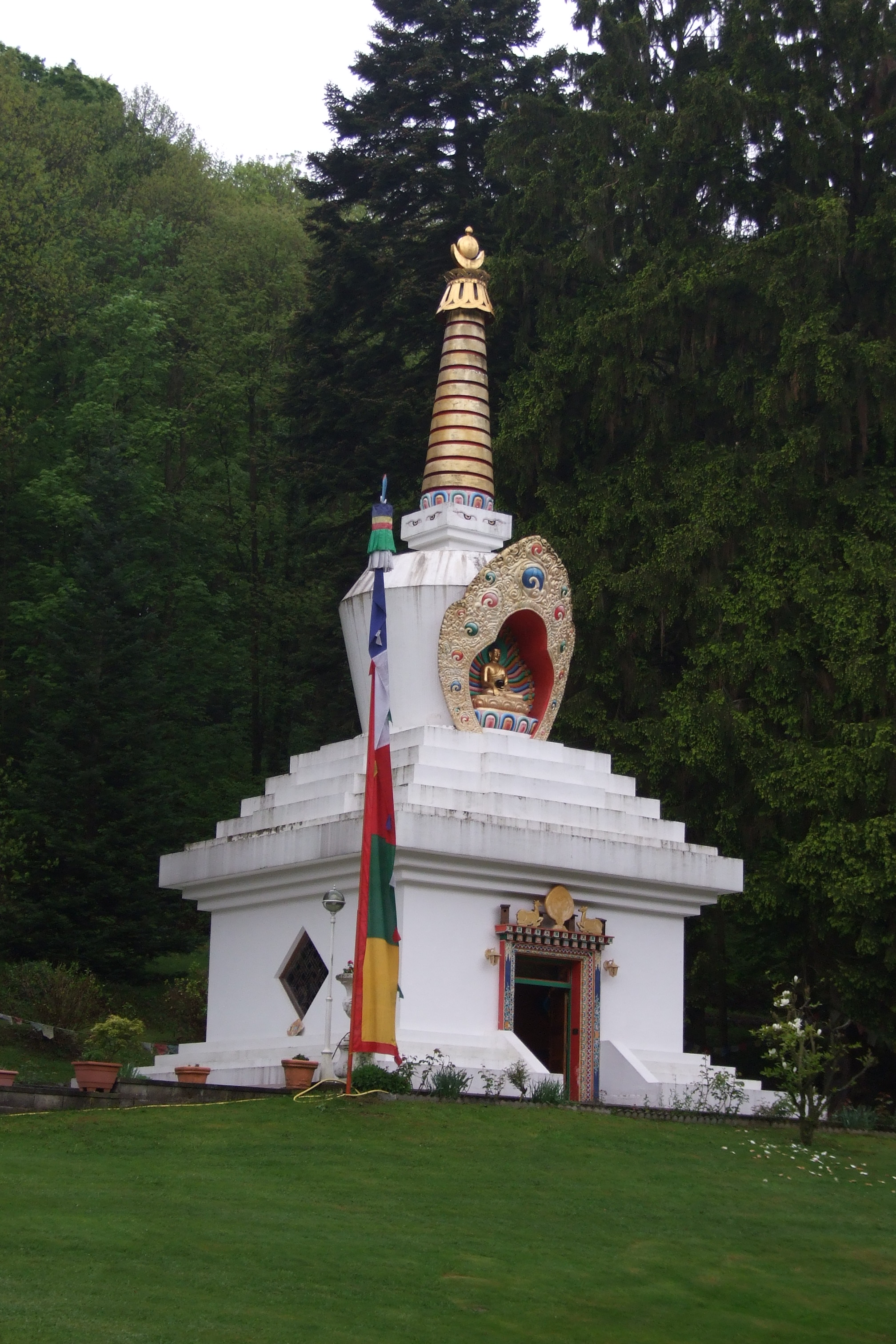

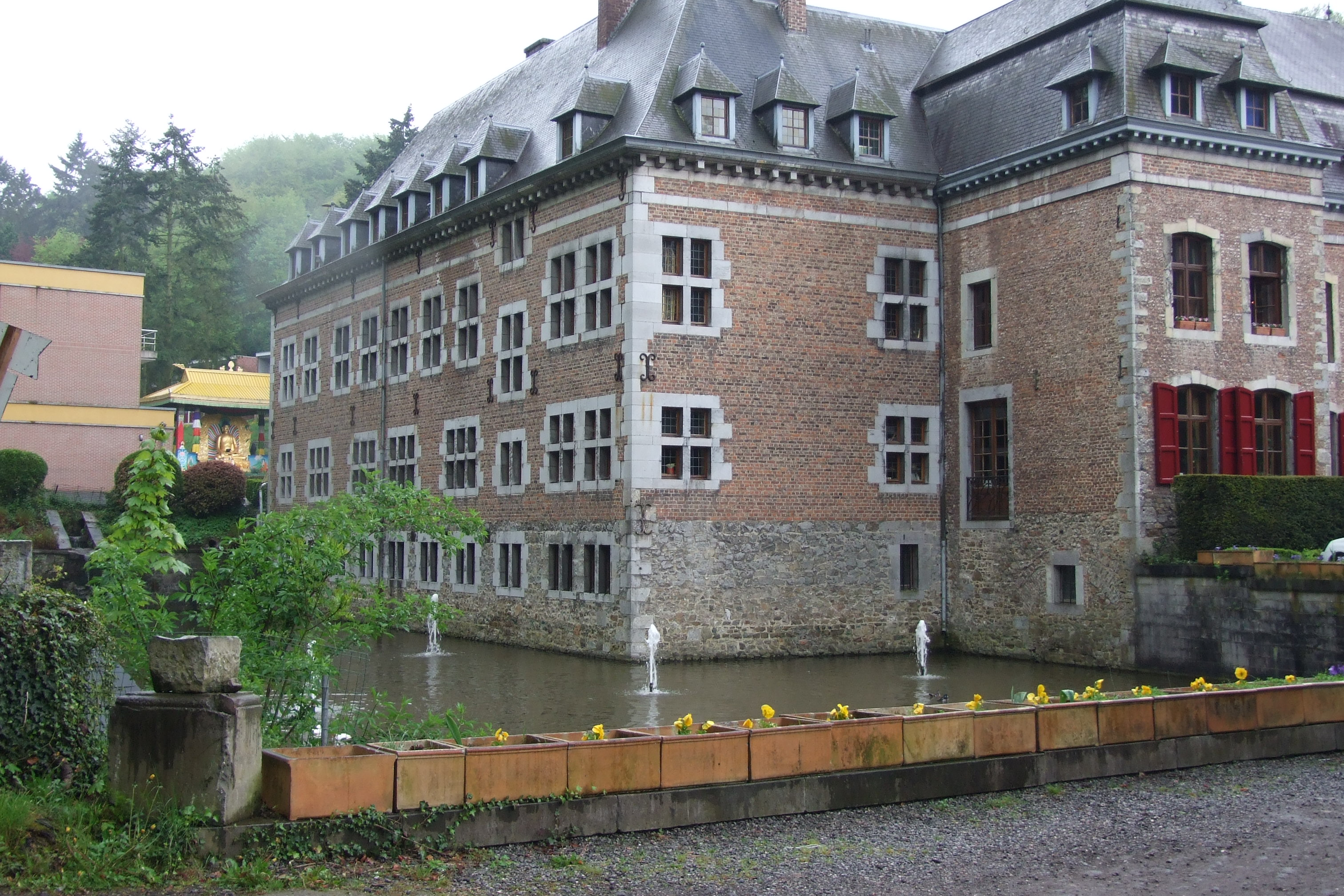
