= Jainism in Belgium =

Belgium Jains
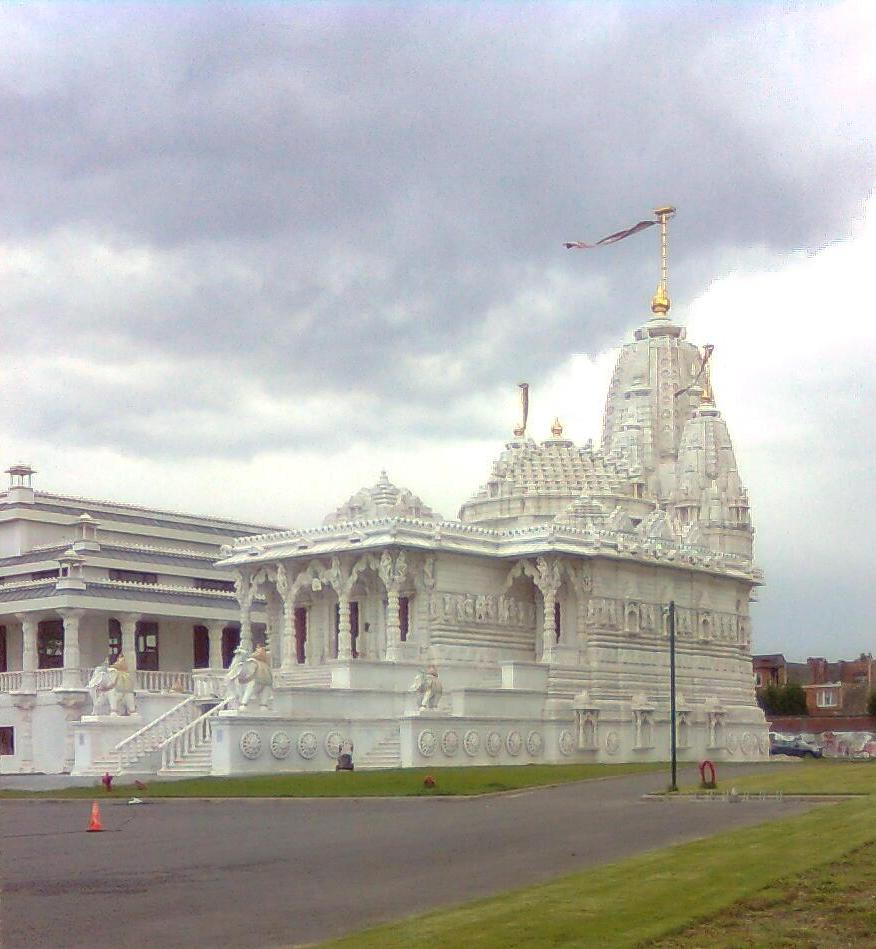
- Jain temple, Antwerp

Total population
- 1,500

Languages
- Belgium Language; Indian Languages

Religion
- Jainism

Jainisms is a minority followed by about 1,500 people to 2000 people in Belgium.

The majority live in Antwerp, particularly Wilrijk District, where their main temple is also located. Most of the Jains came from the Palanpur region in Gujarat and are involved in the diamond business.

== History ==
The Jains starting arriving in Belgium in the 1960s. They initially traded low quality rough diamonds, with very small margins of profit, while the local Jewish merchants dealt in larger stones. Most of the Jains were from Palanpur in Gujarat, belonging to Shahs and Mehtas castes.

In 1990, the Shankheshwar Parshvanath Jain Temple was constructed and in 1992, the Jain Cultural Centre of Antwerp was formed.

== Jainism today ==
Majority of the diamond traders in Belgium are Jains.

== Leaders within the community ==
Mr Ramesh Mehta, a leader of the community, is a full-fledged member of the Belgian Council of Religious Leaders put up on 17 December 2009.

== Photo gallery ==
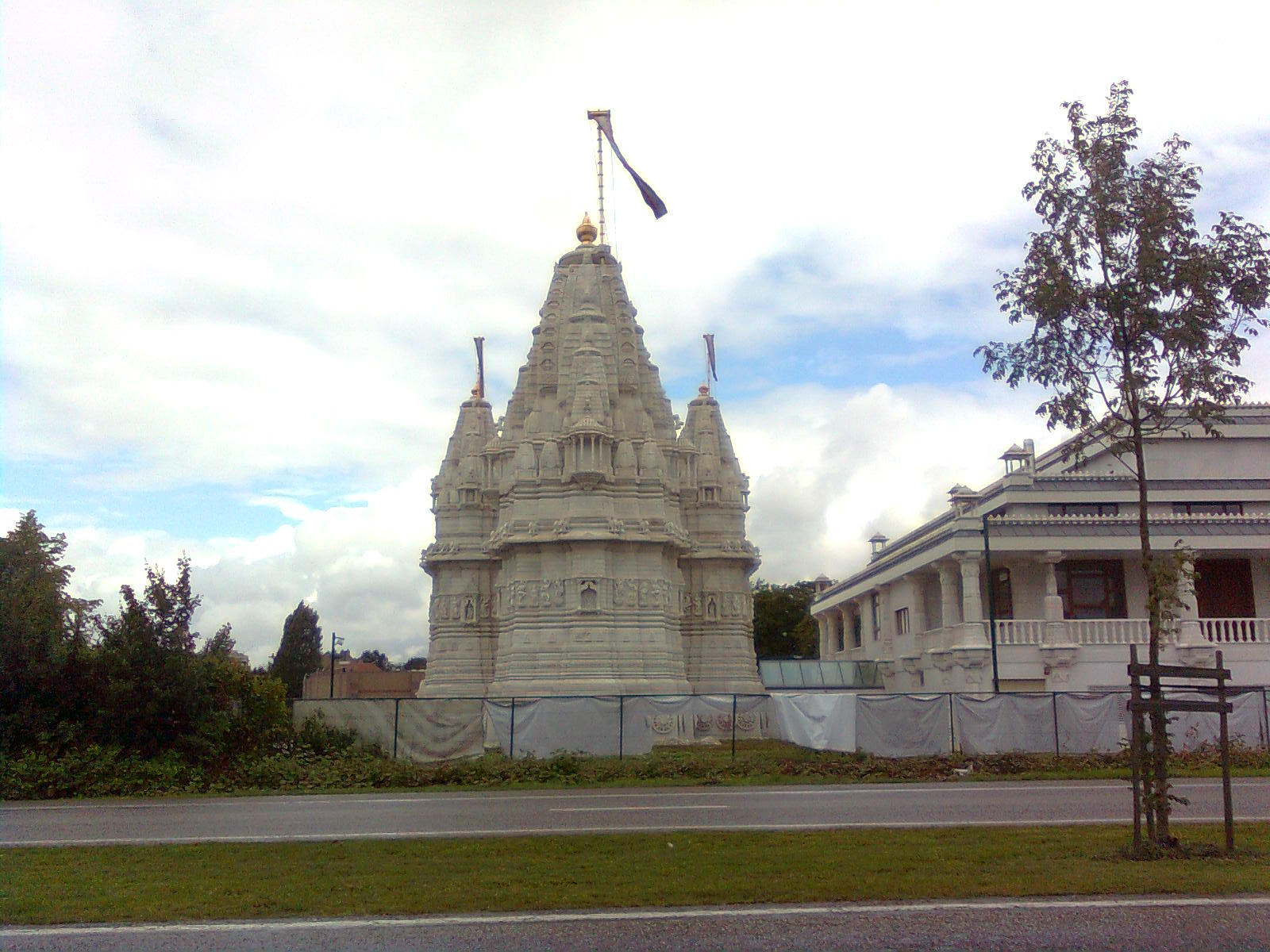

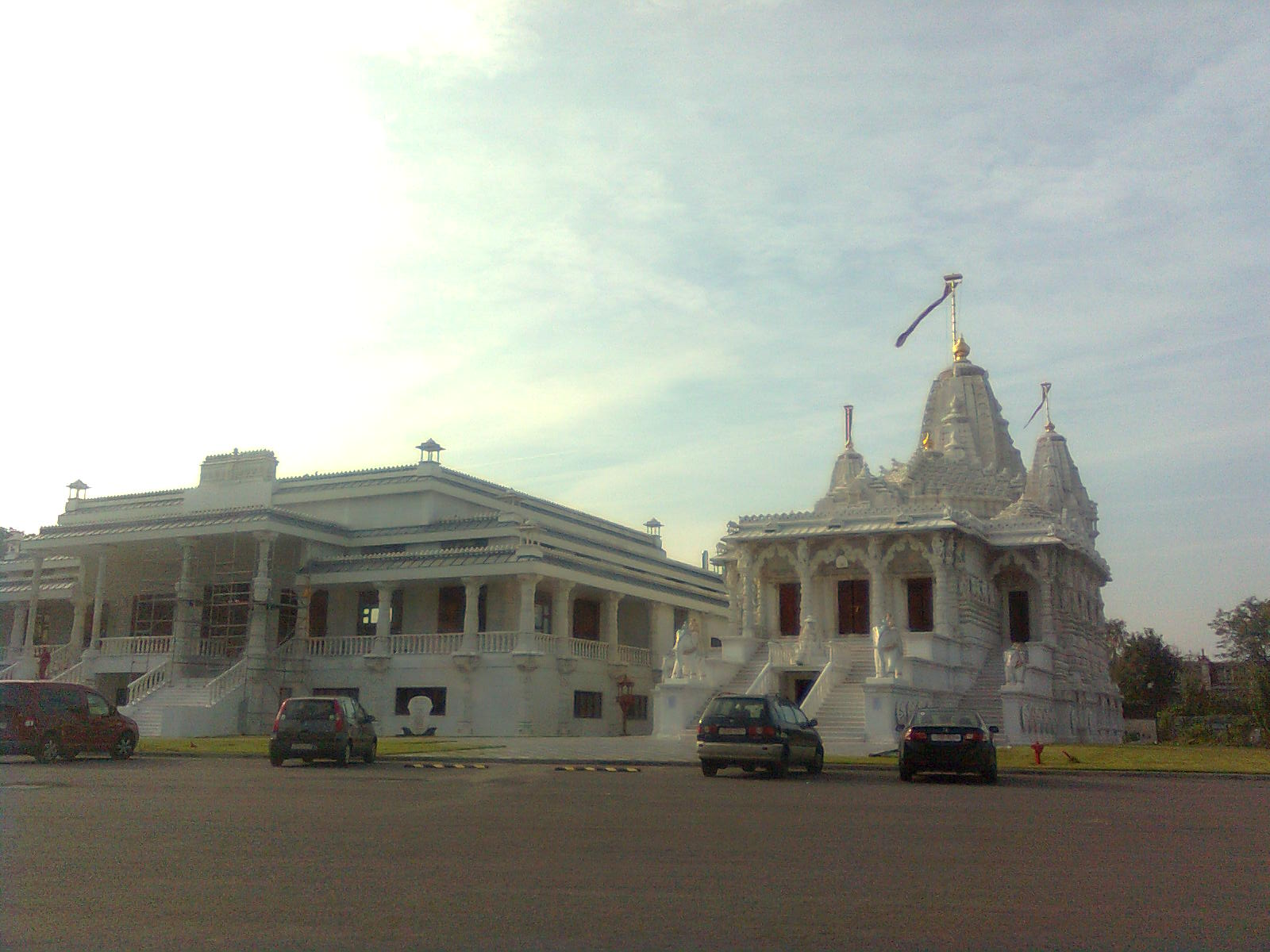

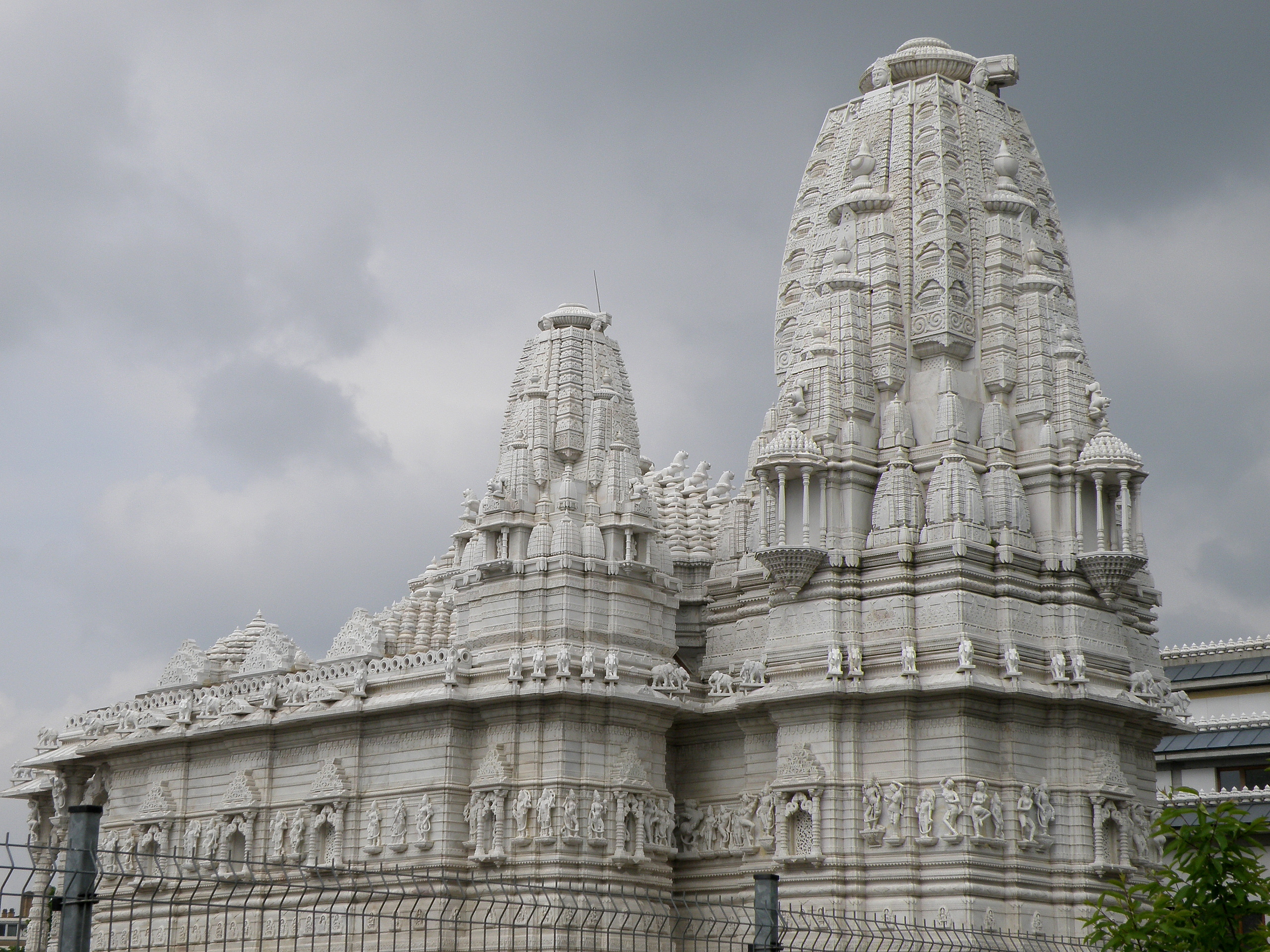

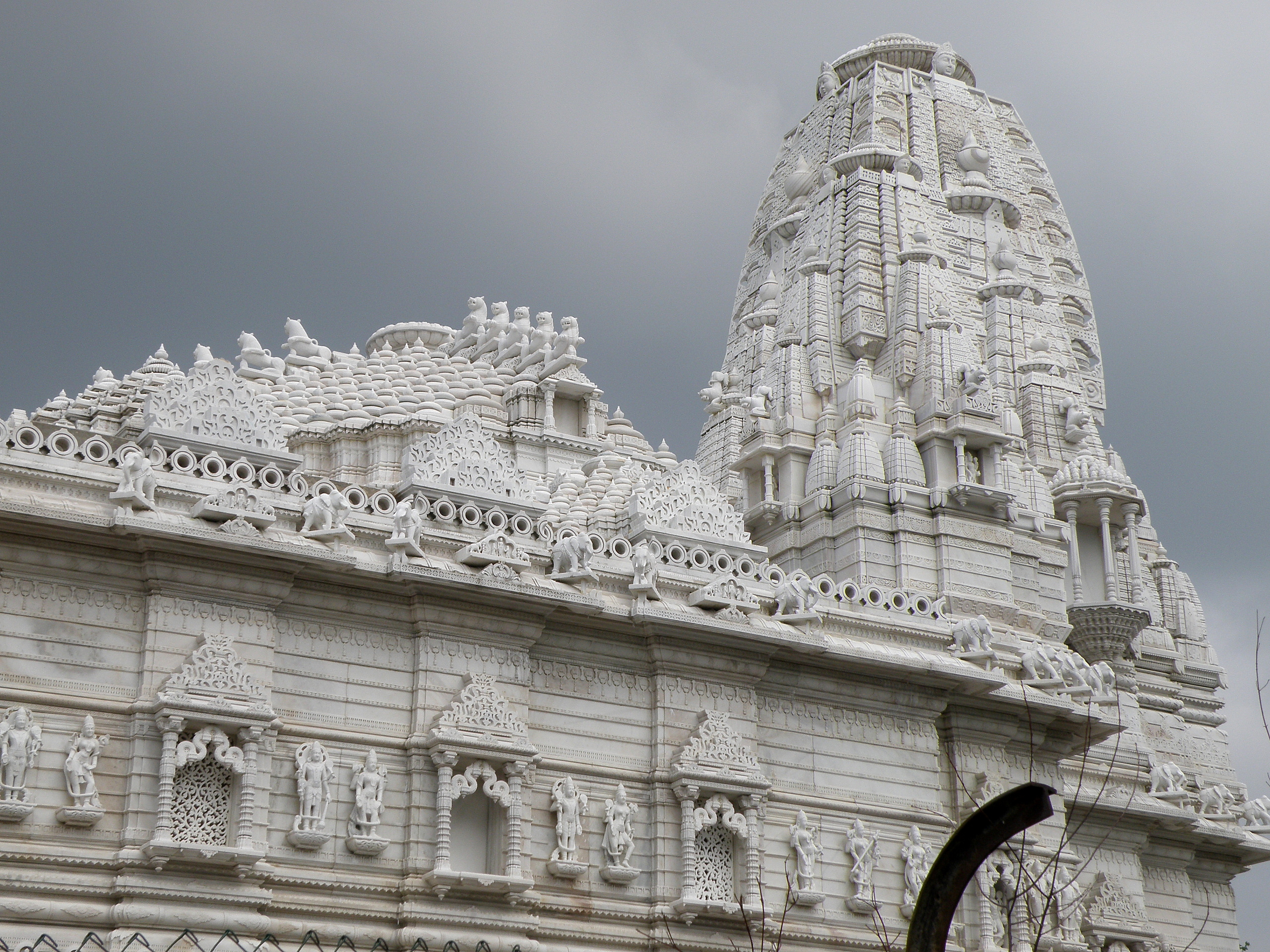

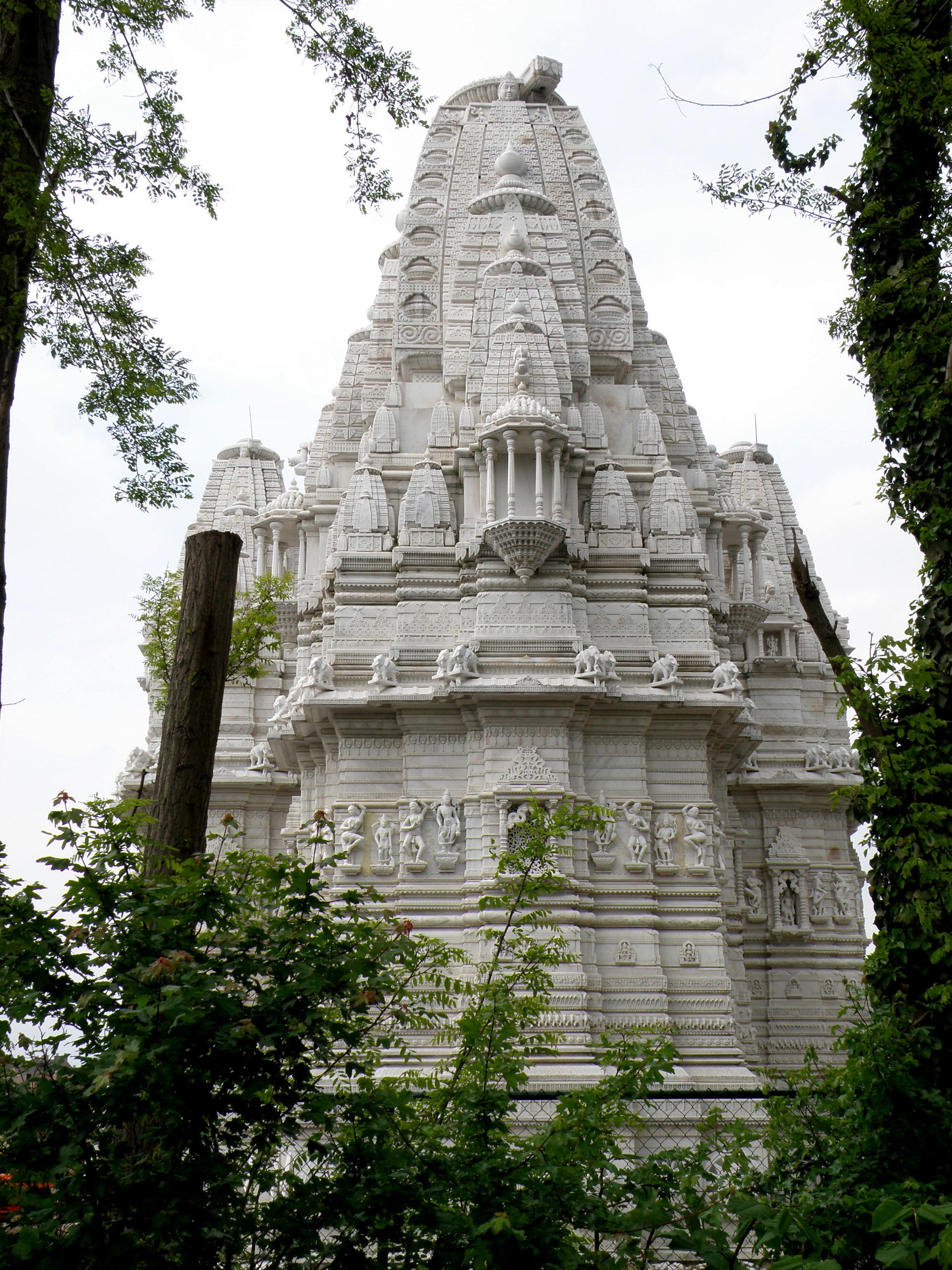

== See also ==
- Jainism
- Jainism in Europe
- Jainism in the United States
- Jainism in Africa
- Jainism in India
- Religion in Belgium
- Brampton Jain Temple
- History of the Jews in Antwerp
