= Shankheshwar Parshvanath Jain Temple =

Jain temple in Belgium

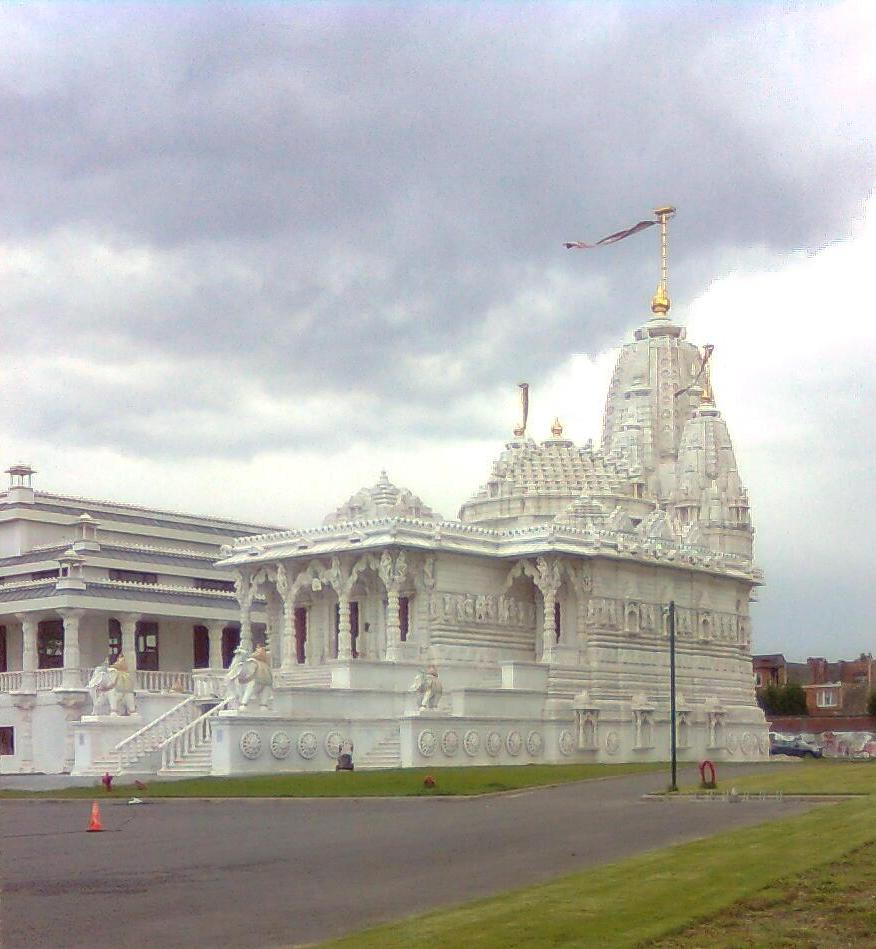
- Jain temple, Antwerp

Religion
- Affiliation: Jainism
- Deity: Parshvanatha
- Festivals: Mahavir Jayanti, Paryushana

Location
- Location: Wilrijk, Belgium
- Interactive map of Shankheshwar Parshvanath Jain Temple
- Coordinates: 51°10′24.8″N 04°23′47″E

Architecture
- Established: 1990
- Temple: 1

Website
- https://jccaantwerp.com/

The Shankheshwar Parshvanath Jain Temple is a Jain temple located in the district Wilrijk of the city of Antwerp, Antwerp Province, Belgium. It is currently the only Jain temple in continental Europe.

== History ==
The building has a surface area of 1,000 m^{2} and has been in use since 2010. Construction started in 1990 in India. After it was completed in 2000, the building was dismantled piece by piece, shipped to Belgium and rebuilt on its current location. The white marble design is inspired by traditional Jain temples.

== About temple ==
It is the biggest Jain temple outside of India. The temple houses an information centre about Jainism.

== See also ==
- Jainism in Belgium
