= Organized secularism =

Belgian irreligious union

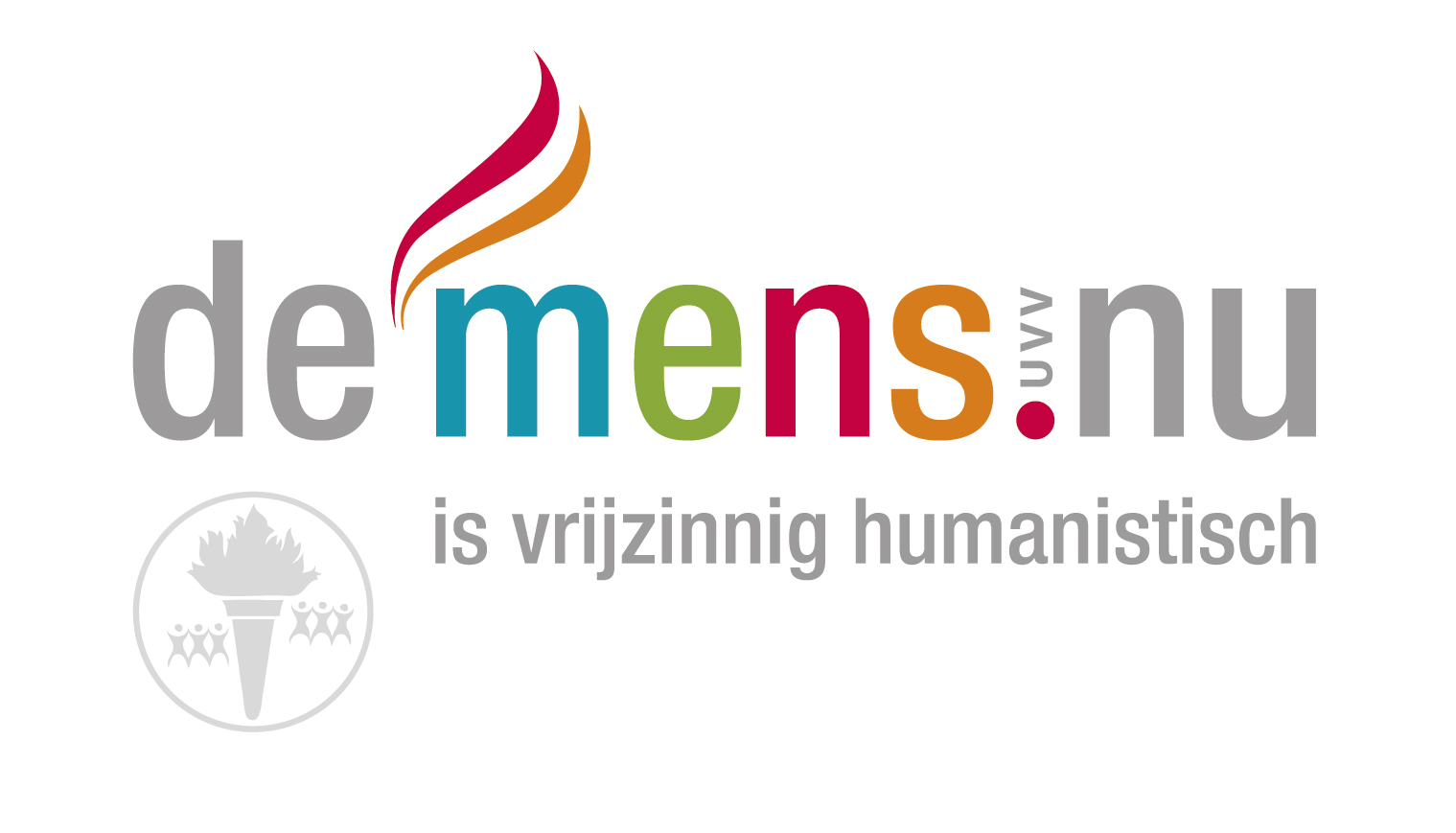
Logo deMens.nu

In Belgium, organized secularism (French: Laïcité organisée, Dutch: georganiseerde vrijzinnigheid) is the local associations and organizations which provide moral support for naturalist, atheist, agnostic, secular humanist, freethinking, Bright, or irreligious and non-confessional citizens. A person who subscribes to such entities or ideologies, or at least espouses an interest in "free inquiry" apart from religious traditions is described as a "secular" or "free-thinker" (French: laïque, Dutch: vrijzinnig).

In Dutch-speaking Belgium, the leading humanist group is deMens.nu (Humanity Now, formerly known as the Union of Liberal Associations), which acts as a national federation for the non-religious and an umbrella group for local "liberal humanist" and freethought associations. In French-speaking Belgium it is the Centre d'Action Laïque (CAL, or Centre for Secular Action).

In contrast to the French model for communal organization for irreligionists and nontheists, the Belgian model is considerably more structured and tight-knit due to the Netherlands-like pillarization of Belgian religious systems and communities; in such a structure, various social organizations, such as scouting troops, trade unions and cooperatives and mutual societies are duplicated for each religious or philosophical community (Catholic, Protestant, Jewish, Muslim, socialist, liberal, etc.). Hence, many Belgian nontheists and secular humanists participate in congregation-style services led by secular pastors and chaplains. This parallels the distinction in the United States between secular humanists and religious humanists, who differ according to their view of humanism as an analytical term for their implicit beliefs or a distinct religion-like philosophy.

== Belgian law ==
Currently, section 181 of the Belgian Constitution provides as follows:

- "§ 1st. Salaries and pensions of ministers of religion are the responsibility of the state the amounts necessary to deal with them is the annual budget.
- § 2. Salaries and pensions to representatives of organizations recognized by law as providing moral assistance according to a philosophical non-religious charge of the state the amounts necessary to deal with them is the annual budget. "

Under § 1st, recognized the Catholic religion, the Protestant, the Anglican, Orthodox worship, Jewish worship and the Muslim faith.

Under § 2, "Act of June 21, 2002 on the Central Council of Philosophical non-denominational Communities of Belgium, delegates and institutions responsible for the management of financial and material interests of recognized non-confessional philosophical communities" recognizes a "philosophical non-confessional community" by province and at national level a "Central Secular Council", composed of the "Secular Action Center" on the French side and the "United Liberal Associations" on the Dutch side.

- "In the capital of each province there is established a public institution called" the establishment of legal assistance of the Central Council secular ", with legal personality and responsible management of financial and material interests of the philosophical community nondenominational recognized and accepted legal assistance services, which are located on the territory of the province "(Article 5 of the Act).

As part of that public status, there are many secular organizations – often much older than the public forum which are also meeting places for people with a common conception of life and homes of secularism have been started in many places for this purpose (sometimes with the support of municipal authorities).

Some associations offer legal assistance on a non-denominational philosophical basis and therefore constitute an alternative to chaplains in hospitals, prisons, army or in the city. Some of these associations organize ceremonies celebrating locally for those who ask some key moments of life:

- sponsorship (on the occasion of the birth of a child)
- the secular celebration of youth
- secular marriage (as distinct from civil marriage)
- secular funeral

These ceremonies are an alternative rite of passage for those who wish to socialize some important moments of their lives without recourse to the splendours of a religion in which they can identify.

The budget at the expense of the Belgian state in 2003 for these grants amounted to €9,010,190.

== Composition of Central Secular Council ==
The Central Secular Council, consisting of the Secular Action Center (Walloon-oriented) and the Union of Liberal Associations (Flemish-oriented), assembles a large number of civil organizations which service non-confessional individuals and families.

== Organized secularism outside Belgium ==
=== In Europe ===
Of course, associations "secular" in this sense also exist in France and in many other countries. A public status, assimilating this type of organization to a "recognized religion" are particularly Norway and Germany. The Norwegian organization has even won the right to solemnize marriages valid under civil law as well as the recognized churches.

In the United Kingdom, Humanists UK (which inherited the British wing of the Ethical Culture movement) is the largest provider of Humanist officiants and celebrants for ceremonies and rituals.

=== In North America ===
In the United States, Freethought congregations have existed since the mid-19th century, when German freethinkers and anti-clericalists emigrated from their homeland in the midst of the 1848 Revolution; they were among the first to establish openly "free congregations" in the country. Today, Greg Epstein currently heads the Humanist Chaplaincy at Harvard University, which was founded in 1974 by current Chaplain Emeritus and former Roman Catholic priest Tom Ferrick.

In addition, the Ethical Culture movement and most Unitarian Universalist churches carry out services for, and welcome participation from, non-theists and secular humanists.

== See also ==
- Irreligion in Belgium
