= Freedom of religion in Belgium =

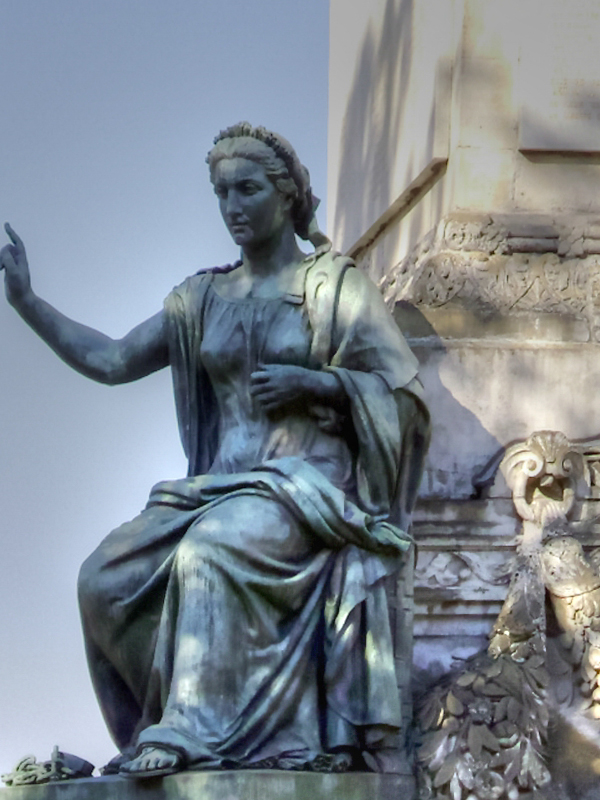
Personification of "Freedom of Worship" on the Congress Column in Brussels

In 2022, the constitution of Belgium provides for freedom of religion. The law prohibits discrimination based on religious orientation; however federal law bans face-coverings being worn in public.

In 2022, the country was scored 3 out of 4 for religious freedom; this was due mainly to discrimination against Muslims and the rise of far-right parties.

== Religious demography ==
The Government of Belgium does not keep statistics listing religious affiliation but the population is predominantly Roman Catholic, according to a 2006 government report and a university study issued in 2000.

In 2018, the German GESIS-Leibniz Institute for the Social Sciences surveyed religious belief in the country with results showing that 57.1% of residents were Roman Catholic, 20.2% "nonbeliever/agnostic," 9.1% atheist, 6.8% Muslim (mostly Sunni), 2.8% other non-Orthodox Christian, 2.3% Protestant, 0.6% Orthodox Christian, 0.3% Jewish, 0.3% Buddhist, and 0.5% "other." A 2015 study by the Catholic University of Lovain estimated that the Muslam population are based in Flanders, Brussels and Wallonia.

In 2007 religion played a role in some life events in Belgium: 25.6% of couples opted for a marriage in the Church, 58.4% of funerals included religious services and 54.6% of the children born in the country were baptized. Only 8.5% of the population went to church on Christmas in 2007. In Brussels, the capital city of Belgium, religious events were a much smaller part of life; in 2007, only 7.2% opted for a marriage in the Church, 22.6% of funerals included religious services and 14.8 of children born in Brussels were baptized.

In 2005, the country consisted of 42–43% non-believers.

A 2005 report of the Université libre de Bruxelles estimated that 15% of the Catholic population regularly attended religious services, and 10% of the Muslim population were "practicing Muslims."

== Status of religious freedom ==
=== Legal and policy framework ===
The constitution provides for freedom of worship. It states no person can be required to participate in any religious group’s ceremonies or to observe the group’s religious days of rest. It also bars the state from interfering in the appointment of religious clergy and obligates the state to pay the salaries and pensions of clergy in recognized houses of worship.

The Government accords "recognized" status to Catholicism, Protestantism (including Evangelicals and Pentecostals), Judaism, Anglicanism (separately from other Protestant groups), Islam, and Orthodox (Greek and Russian). Representative bodies for these religious groups receive subsidies from government revenues. The Government also supports the freedom to participate in secular organizations. These secular humanist groups serve as a seventh recognized "religion," and their organizing body, the Central Council of Non-Religious Philosophical Communities of Belgium, receives funds and benefits similar to those of the other recognized religious groups. Unrecognized groups can worship freely, but will not receive any government funding.

=== Formal limitations ===
Belgium has prohibited the wearing of niqab and other face-covering garments in public, officially due to the state's claim of the importance of "living together". In two cases in 2017 the European Court of Human Rights recognized this policy, whereas the United Nations Human Rights Committee in 2019 criticized Belgium for this policy as being against freedom of religion.

=== Education ===
The constitution requires religious teaching in public schools to be neutral; there is no definition of 'neutral' in the constitution. Students in Flanders can opt out of these classes; outside of Flanders, these courses are mandatory. Francophone schools must legally offer a mandatory one-hour per week philosophy and citizenship course and a one-hour mandatory course on either philosophy and citizenship or one of the recognized religions.

=== Antisemitism ===
Federal law prohibits public statements inciting religious hatred, including Holocaust denial; the maximum sentence for Holocaust denial is one year in prison. An antiracism law that prohibits discrimination based on nationality, race, skin color, ancestry, national origin, or ethnicity can legally be applied to cases of antisemitism.

=== Societal abuses and discrimination ===
According to the Jewish Policy Research in the UK, Belgium had the lowest level of antisemitic incident across the 12 European countries they analysed.

In 2021, the Unia agency reported 81 antisemitic incidents, a decrease from 2020; half of these were online. Unia also reported 243 cases of other religious discrimination or harassment in 2021, a decrease from 2020; most of these were against Muslims, although 4 were against Christians.

== See also ==
- Religion in Belgium
- Human rights in Belgium
