= Sikhism in Belgium =

Total population
- 10,000

Regions with significant populations
- Watermael-Boitsfort • Sint-Truiden • Vilvoorde • Borgloon • Liège • Alken • Ostend • Ghent

Languages
- Punjabi • Languages of Belgium

Sikhism is a minority religion in Belgium, but Sikhs have played a role in Belgian history; during World War I, many Sikhs fought in Belgium.

== Migration to Belgium ==
The first eight Sikhs who came to Belgium as private citizens arrived on 8 November 1972 as political exiles. They were expelled from Uganda; at the time, it was under the dictatorial rule of Idi Amin, who drove all Indians from the country. Other Sikhs who arrived before 1985 (only a handful, among them Jarnail Singh Alhuwalia) were workers at the Indian Embassy. Most Sikhs arrived in the wake of Sukhdev Singh Jalwehra in 1985, after the storming of the Golden Temple in Amritsar by Indian troops the previous year. When Jalwehra arrived in Belgium, a ban existed on the wearing of turbans in passport or identity-card photos. Jalwehra fought the case and won, and Sikhs were no longer required to remove their turbans. In 1993, when King Baudouin I died, Sukhdev Singh Jalwerha paid respect at the palace with a group of other Sikhs as representatives of the Belgian Sikh community.

The first Sikhs in Belgium were predominantly male laborers with limited education, sharing a rented house and dividing the costs. Since they were accustomed to working in agriculture, they looked for work in that sector and found seasonal jobs in the Flemish province of Limburg on fruit farms. Later Sikhs immigrated for economic reasons; they had been living in impoverished regions of the Punjab and came looking for a better life in Belgium. At first they also found employment on fruit farms but when they could afford to do so they established their own shops, particularly shops remaining open at night in Brussels. As immigrants, completing the necessary paperwork was challenging. Sikh women are now arriving in Belgium in greater numbers, many to reunite their families.

== Persecution ==
In 1994, the government of the United States noted that while Belgium has freedom of religion and has not seen much systematic violence directed against religious minorities or newcomers, an exception occurred in 1993 against Sikhs. In Sint-Truiden, Sikh workers in agriculture were bullied by some citizens and one Sikh was shot. A house belonging to Sikhs was bombed, with no fatalities. There were arrests in the aftermath.

== Official Intervention ==
Following problems with immigration documentation which gave rise to concerns about possible human trafficking, the Mayor of Vilvoorde closed the local Gurdwara between October and December 2014, and following disturbances in the Temple, again in September 2016.

== Gurdwaras ==
There are seven Gurdwaras in Belgium; the oldest was founded in Sint-Truiden in 1993.

Gurdwaras in Belgium are:

- Gurdwara Sangat Sahib, Watermaal and Sint-Truiden (Founded in 1993)
- Gurdwara Guru Nanak Sahib, Vilvoorde, Brussels (1999)
- Gurdwara Guru Ram Dass Sikh Study and Cultural Center, Borgloon (2005)
- In Liège (2005)
- Gurdwara Singh Sabha, Alken (2013), Gurudwara Official website
- Gurdwara Shri Guru Ravidass Sabha, Ostend
- Gurdwara Mata Sahib Kaur Ji Ghent
- Gurdwara Guru Har Rai Sahib Ji Antwerpen

== Sikh population ==
According to a Dutch newspaper, there are approximately 10,000 Sikhs in Belgium. A Sikh stronghold is Sint-Truiden (Limburg), where the first Sikh Gurdwara was built. There are about 3,000 Sikhs in Limburg, 2,000 in Liège and more than 2,000 in Brussels. The remainder live throughout Belgium.

Cities with significant Sikh populations are:

- Vilvoorde
- Sint-Truiden
- Liège
- Borgloon
- Tienen
- Ostend
- Ghent
- Antwerp
- Leuven
- Alken
- Hasselt
