= Economy of Belgium =

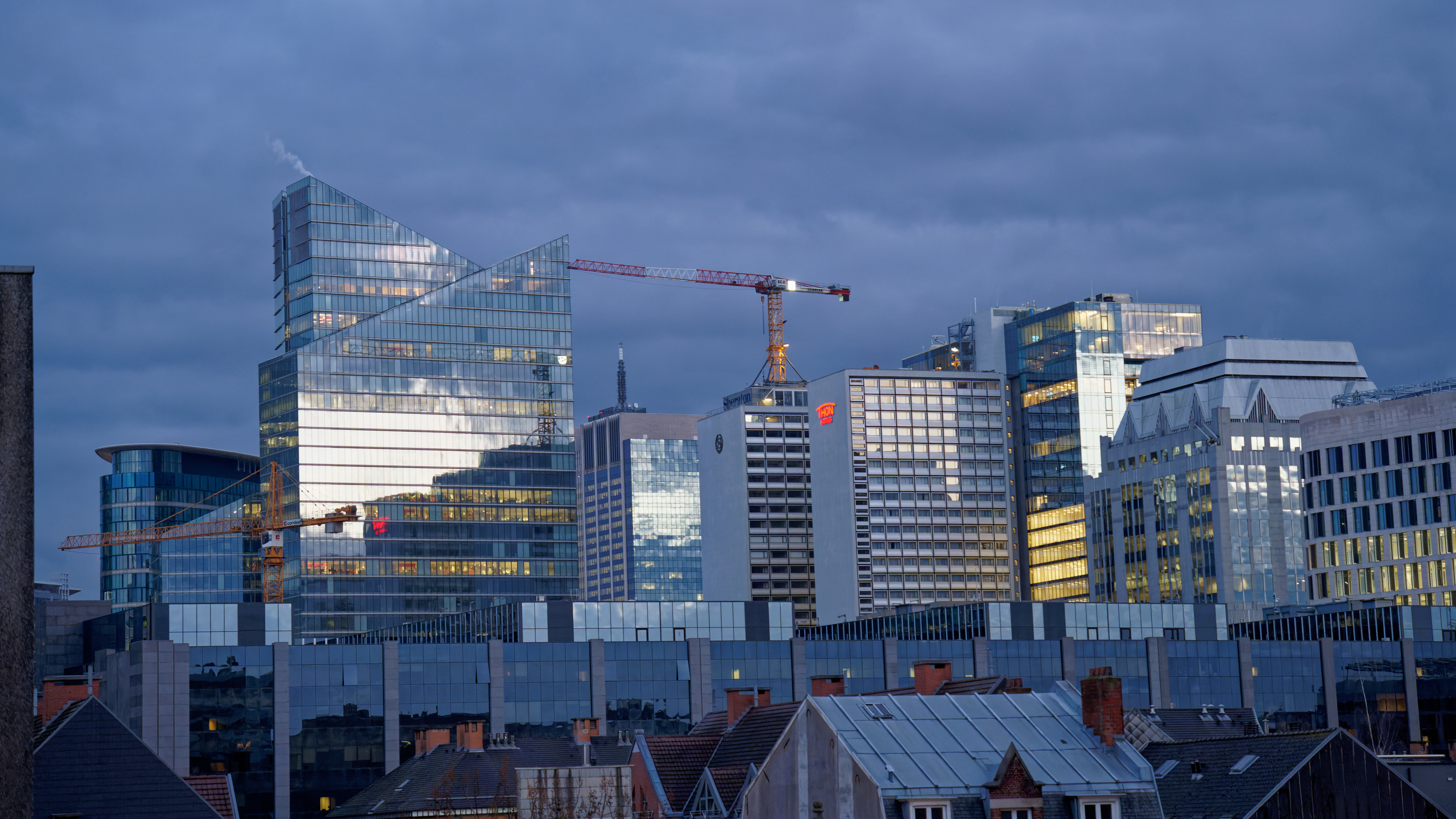
- Brussels is the economic centre of Belgium.
- Currency: Euro (EUR, €)
- Fiscal year: Calendar year
- Trade organisations: EU, OECD, WTO
- Country group: Advanced economy; High-income economy

Statistics
- Population: ▲11,549,888 (1 January 2020)
- GDP: ▲$689.36 billion (nominal, 2025); ▲$889.83 billion (PPP, 2025)
- GDP rank: 22nd (nominal, 2024); 37th (PPP, 2024)
- GDP growth: 1.2% (2025)
- GDP per capita: ▲$58,256 (nominal, 2025); ▲$75,199 (PPP, 2025)
- GDP per capita rank: 15th (nominal, 2024); 19th (PPP, 2024)
- GDP per capita growth: 0.3% (2025)
- GDP by sector: Agriculture: 0.7%; Industry: 22.1%; Services: 77.2%; (2017 est.)
- Inflation (CPI): 2.3% (2023); 3.6% (2024)
- Population below national poverty line: 19.5% at risk of poverty or social exclusion (AROPE, 2019)
- Gini coefficient: 25.1 low (2019, Eurostat)
- Human Development Index: 0.942 very high (2022) (12th); 0.878 very high (11th) (2022)
- Corruption Perceptions Index: 73 out of 100 points (2023) (17th)
- Labour force: 5,105,726 (2020); ▲72.1% employment rate (2023)
- Labour force by occupation: Agriculture: 1.3%; Industry: 18.6%; Services: 80.1%; (2013 est.)
- Unemployment: 5.1% (August 2020); 13.0% youth unemployment (15 to 24 year-olds; June 2020)
- Average gross salary: €5,070 monthly (2024)
- Average net salary: €3,056 monthly (2024)
- Main industries: Engineering and metal products, motor vehicle assembly, transportation equipment, scientific instruments, processed foods and beverages, chemicals, pharmaceuticals, base metals, textiles, glass, petroleum

External
- Exports: $432 billion (2023)
- Export goods: Chemicals, machinery and equipment, finished diamonds, metals and metal products, foodstuffs
- Main export partners: France 19%; Netherlands 14.9%; Germany 13.8%; Italy 6.3%; United States 5.2%; United Kingdom 4.3%; (2023)
- Imports: $472 billion (2023)
- Import goods: Raw materials, machinery and equipment, chemicals, raw diamonds, pharmaceuticals, foodstuffs, transportation equipment, oil products
- Main import partners: Netherlands 18.4%; Germany 13%; France 10.7%; United States 7.1%; China 4.6%; Italy 4.2%; United Kingdom 4.1%; (2023)
- FDI stock: $1.035 trillion (31 December 2017 est.); Abroad: $1.159 trillion (31 December 2017 est.)
- Current account: $1.84 billion (2019 est.)
- Gross external debt: ▲$1.281 trillion (31 March 2016 est.)

Public finance
- Government debt: 98.6% of GDP (2019); €467.160 billion (2019)
- Foreign reserves: $31.76 billion (April 2021 est.)
- Budget balance: €9.0 billion deficit (2019); −1.9% of GDP (2019)
- Revenue: 50.3% of GDP (2019)
- Spending: 52.2% of GDP (2019)
- Economic aid: €2.3 billion from European Structural and Investment Funds (2007–2013)
- Credit rating: Standard & Poor's: AA (Domestic); AA (Foreign); AAA (T&C Assessment); Scope: A+; Outlook: Stable
- All values, unless otherwise stated, are in US dollars.

Belgium has a highly developed high-income mixed economy. The Belgian economy has capitalised on the country's central geographic location, and has a well-developed transport network, and diversified industrial and commercial base. Belgium was the first continental European country to join the Industrial Revolution in the early 19th century. It has since developed a highly-developed transportation infrastructure made up of ports (most notably the Port of Antwerp), canals, railways, and highways, in order to integrate its industry with that of its neighbours. Among OECD nations, Belgium has a highly efficient and strong social security system; social expenditure accounts for roughly 29% of GDP.

Belgium's industry is concentrated mainly in the populous region of Flanders in the north, around Brussels and in the two biggest Walloon cities, Liège and Charleroi, along the Sillon industriel. Belgium imports raw materials and semi-finished goods that are further processed and re-exported. Except for its coal, which is no longer economical to exploit, Belgium has few natural resources other than fertile soil. Despite the heavy industrial component, services dominate the country's economy and account for 77.2% of Belgium's gross domestic product (GDP), while agriculture accounts for 0.7%.

With exports equivalent to over two-thirds of the country's gross national income (GNI), Belgium depends heavily on world trade. Belgium's trade advantages are derived from its central geographic location and a highly skilled, multilingual, and productive work force. One of the founding members of the European Community, Belgium strongly supports deepening the powers of the present-day European Union (EU) to integrate European economies further. About three-quarters of its trade is with other EU countries. In 2021, Belgium's public debt was about 108% of the country's gross domestic product (GDP).

== History ==
=== In the twentieth century ===
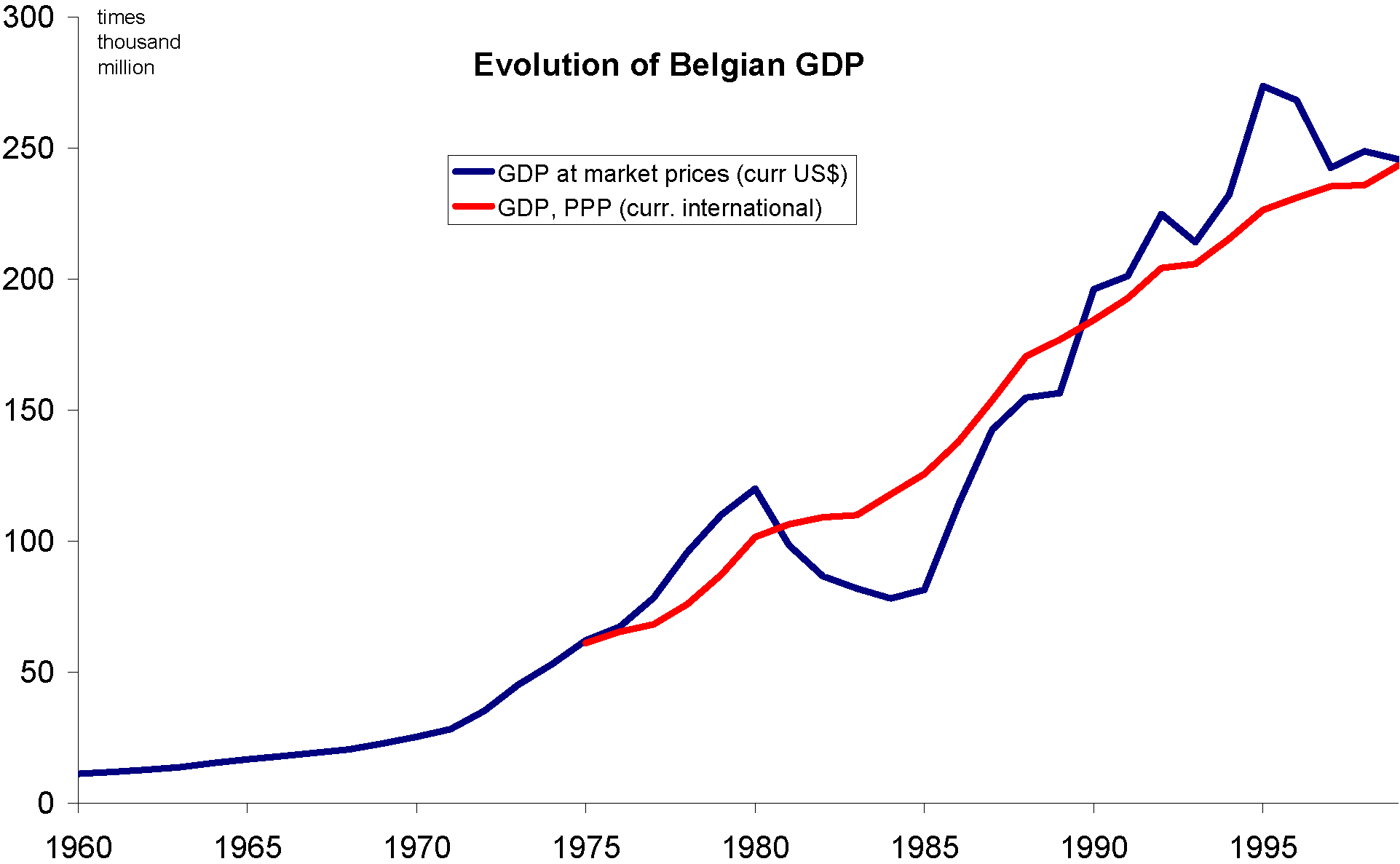
Evolution of the Belgian GDP

For 50 years through World War II, French-speaking Wallonia was a technically advanced, industrial region, with its industry concentrated along the sillon industriel, while Dutch-speaking Flanders was predominantly agricultural with some industry, mainly processing agricultural products and textiles. This disparity began to fade during the interwar period. When Belgium emerged from World War II with its industrial infrastructure relatively undamaged thanks to the Galopin doctrine, the stage was set for a period of rapid development, particularly in Flanders. The postwar boom years, enhanced by the establishment of the European Union and NATO headquarters in Brussels, contributed to the rapid expansion of light industry throughout most of Flanders, particularly along a corridor stretching between Brussels and Antwerp, which is the second-largest port in Europe, after the port of Rotterdam.

Foreign investment contributed significantly to Belgian economic growth in the 1960s. In particular, U.S. firms played a leading role in the expansion of light industrial and petrochemical industries in the 1960s and 1970s.

The older, traditional industries of Wallonia, particularly the steel industry, began to lose their competitive edge during this period, but the general growth of world prosperity masked this deterioration until the 1973 and 1979 oil price shocks and resultant shifts in international demand sent the economy into a period of prolonged recession. In the 1980s and 1990s, the economic center of the country continued to shift northwards to Flanders with investments by multinationals (automotive industry, chemical industry) and growing local industrial agriculture (for textiles and food).

The early 1980s saw the country facing a difficult period of structural adjustment caused by declining demand for its traditional products, deteriorating economic performance, and neglected structural reform. Consequently, the 1980–82 recession shook Belgium to the core—unemployment mounted, social welfare costs increased, personal debt soared, the government deficit climbed to 13% of GDP, and the national debt, although mostly held domestically, mushroomed.

Against this grim backdrop, in 1982, Prime Minister Martens' center-right coalition government formulated an economic recovery program to promote export-led growth by enhancing the competitiveness of Belgium's export industries through an 8.5% devaluation. Economic growth rose from 2% in 1984 to a peak of 4% in 1989. In May 1990, the government linked the Belgian franc to the Deutsche Mark, primarily through closely tracking German interest rates. Consequently, as German interest rates rose after 1990, Belgian rates have increased and contributed to a decline in the economic growth rate. In 1992–93, the Belgian economy suffered the worst recession since World War II, with the real GDP declining 0.96% in 1993.

On 1 May 1998, Belgium became a first-tier member of the European Monetary Union.

=== In the twenty-first century ===
Belgium switched from the Belgian franc to the euro as its currency after 1 January 2002. Belgian per capita GDP ranks among the world's highest. In 2008, the per capita income (PPP) was $37,500. The federal government has not managed to present balanced budgets in recent years and public debt remains high, at 99% of 2009 GDP. In 2009, during the Great Recession, Belgium suffered negative growth and increased unemployment. GDP growth in 2009 was −1.5%.

=== Economic policy & impact of COVID-19 ===
During the Covid-19 Pandemic, the Belgian government implemented a number of safety measures such as the temporary closing of non-essential businesses, mandatory work from home, as well as heavily limiting international travel. The disruptions caused by the Covid-19 pandemic, as well as the measures to contain it, affected most businesses in the country, although not necessarily to the same extent. The sectors most impacted by the pandemic were entertainment, non-food trade, and accommodations, experiencing around 70% - 90% (2020) loss of revenue, while sectors like public administration and education experienced a 4% - 21% loss of revenue. These conditions caused the GDP to decrease by 3.3% as the end of the first quarter neared, then by 11.9% by the second quarter. After a pickup through the third quarter and stabilization during the fourth, the GDP collectively dropped 6.3% (2020).

Maritime trade, which makes up about 7% of Belgium's GDP, fell approximately 3.4% (2020). Sectors like automotive declined and continue to see a decline to this day.

Household incomes experienced drops in the face of COVID-19, with an approximate 40% who became unemployed and about a 65% decrease in market incomes overall (2020). During this time employment began to shift from on-site labor to off-site from home labor, with an approximate 62% working remotely.

Belgium adopted various support policies as a response to the virus' shut down of various businesses and to tackle the rising unemployed population. They extended the duration of unemployment benefits from June to August, increased the benefits from 65% - 70% of previous wage, and provided a daily supplement of 5.63 euro (2020). Following their economic implementations, they also faced a debt of 117.8% of their GDP (2021).

=== Trade unions ===
With 65% of the workers belonging to a union, Belgium is a country with one of the highest percentages of trade union membership. Only the Scandinavian countries have a higher trade union density. The biggest union with around 1.7 million members is the Christian democrat Confederation of Christian Trade Unions (ACV-CSC) which was founded in 1904. The origins of the union can be traced back to the "Anti-Socialist Cotton Workers Union" that was founded in 1886. The second biggest union is the socialist General Federation of Belgian Labour (ABVV-FGTB) which has a membership of more than 1.5 million. The ABVV-FGTB traces its origins to 1857, when the first Belgian union was founded in Ghent by a group of weavers. This and other socialist unions became unified around 1898. The ABVV-FGTB in its current form dates back to 1945. The third major multi-sector union in Belgium is the liberal (classical liberal) union General Confederation of Liberal Trade Unions of Belgium (ACLVB-CGSLB) which is relatively small in comparison to the first two with a little under 290 thousand members. The ACLVB-CGSLB was founded in 1920 in an effort to unite the many small liberal unions. Back then the liberal union was known as the "Nationale Centrale der Liberale Vakbonden van België". In 1930, the ACLVB-CGSLB adopted its current name.

Besides these "big three" there are a number of smaller unions, some more influential than others. These smaller unions tend to specialize in one profession or economic sector. Next to these specialized unions there is also the Neutral and Independent Union that rejects the pillarization of the "big three" trade unions (their affiliation with political parties). There is also a small Flemish nationalist union that exists only in the Flemish-speaking part of Belgium, called the Vlaamse Solidaire Vakbond. The last Belgian union worth mentioning is the very small, but highly active anarchist union called the Vrije Bond.

== Employment ==
The social security system, which expanded rapidly during the prosperous 1950s and 1960s, includes a medical system, unemployment insurance coverage, child allowances, invalid benefits, and other benefits and pensions. With the onset of a recession in the 1970s, this system became an increasing burden on the economy and accounted for much of the government budget deficits. The national unemployment figures mask considerable differences between Flanders and Wallonia. Unemployment in Wallonia is mainly structural, while in Flanders it is cyclical. Flanders' unemployment levels are generally only about half those of Walloon. The southern region continues a difficult transition out of sunset industries (mainly coal and steel), while sunrise industries (chemicals, high-tech, and services) dominate in Flanders.

Belgium's unemployment rate was 6.5% in 2008. A total of 4.99 million people make up Belgium's labor force. The vast majority of these people (80%), work in the service sector. The Belgian Industry claims 19% of the labor force; and agriculture claims 1%. As in other industrialized nations, pension and other social entitlement programs have become a major economic and political concern as the baby boomers approach retirement age.

== Budget ==
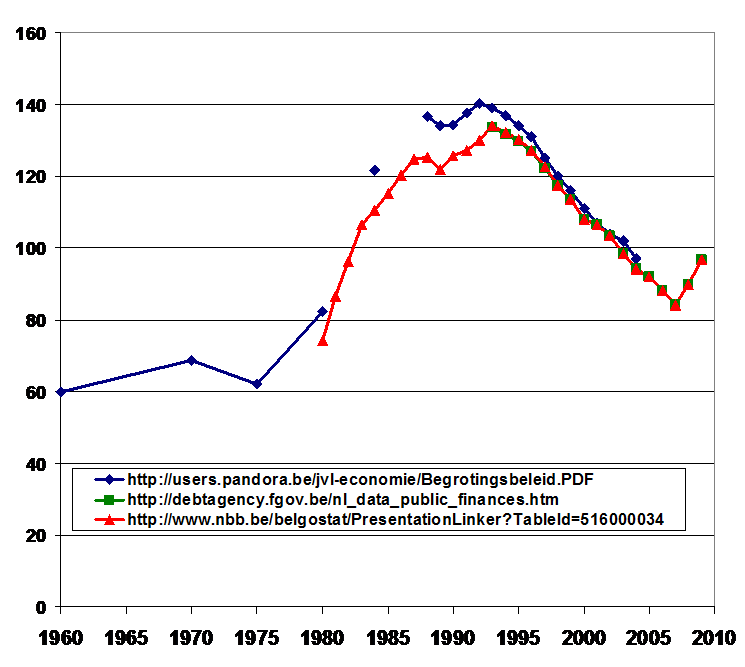
Evolution of the Belgian public debt as % of Belgian GDP

Although Belgium is a wealthy country, public expenditures far exceeded income for many years, and taxes were not diligently pursued. The Belgian Government reacted to the 1973 and 1979 oil price hikes by hiring the redundant work force into the public sector and subsidizing industries like coal, steel, textiles, glass, and shipbuilding, which had lost their international competitive edge. As a result, cumulative government debt reached 121% of GDP by the end of the 1980s. However, thanks to Belgium's high personal savings rate, the Belgian Government financed the deficit from mainly domestic savings, minimizing the deleterious effects on the overall economy.

The federal government ran a 7.1% budget deficit in 1992 at the time of the EU's Treaty of Maastricht, which established conditions for Economic and Monetary Union (EMU) that led to adoption of the common Euro currency on 1 January 2002. Among other criteria spelled out under the Maastricht treaty, the Belgian Government had to attain a budget deficit of no greater than 3% of GDP by the end of 1997; Belgium achieved this, with a total budget deficit in 2001 (just prior to implementation of the Euro) that amounted to 0.2% of GDP. The government has balanced the budget every year since, until 2009 where it ran a deficit of about $25 billion. Belgium's accumulated public debt remains high at 99% of 2009 GDP. A slight decrease in the accumulated public debt compared to GDP has been seen, however, thanks to a higher economic growth rate compared to the budget growth rate, which pushed the percentage from 99% of GDP in 2009 to 95% of GDP in 2011, a four-point decrease in two years, a feat rare enough to mention in the Western World.

== Sectors ==
=== Agriculture ===
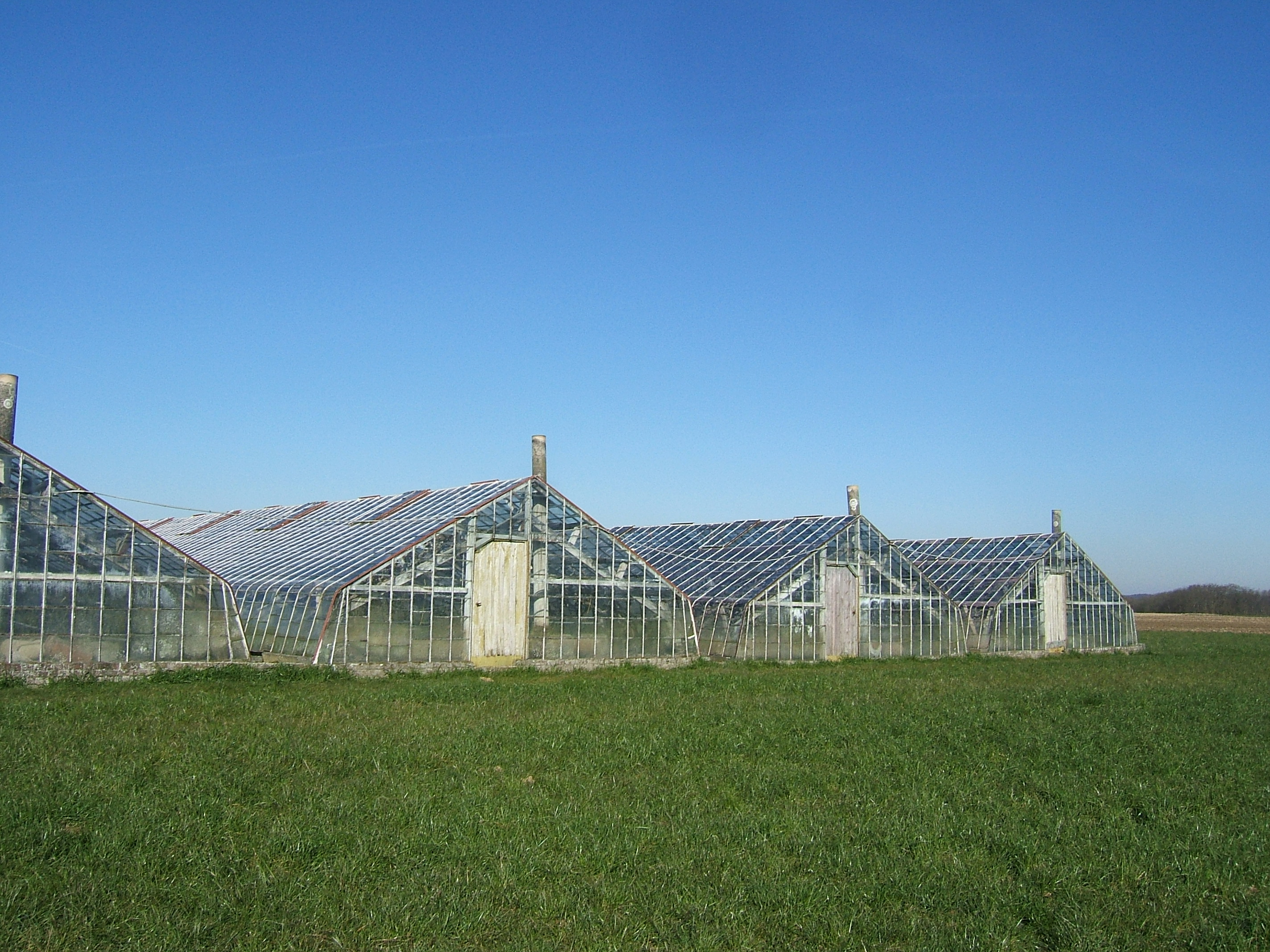
Greenhouses for grapes in Flemish Brabant

Agriculture and horticulture in Flanders has traditionally a familial character, but just like agriculture in other regions, is increasingly characterised by an increase in scale, modernisation and expansion. In Flanders, intensive sectors constitute the largest segment of agriculture: pig breeding, poultry and dairy farming, vegetables and fruit, and ornamental plant culture. In Wallonia, the French-speaking part of Belgium, the emphasis is more on arable farming and extensive soil-based cattle breeding.

=== Diamond industry ===
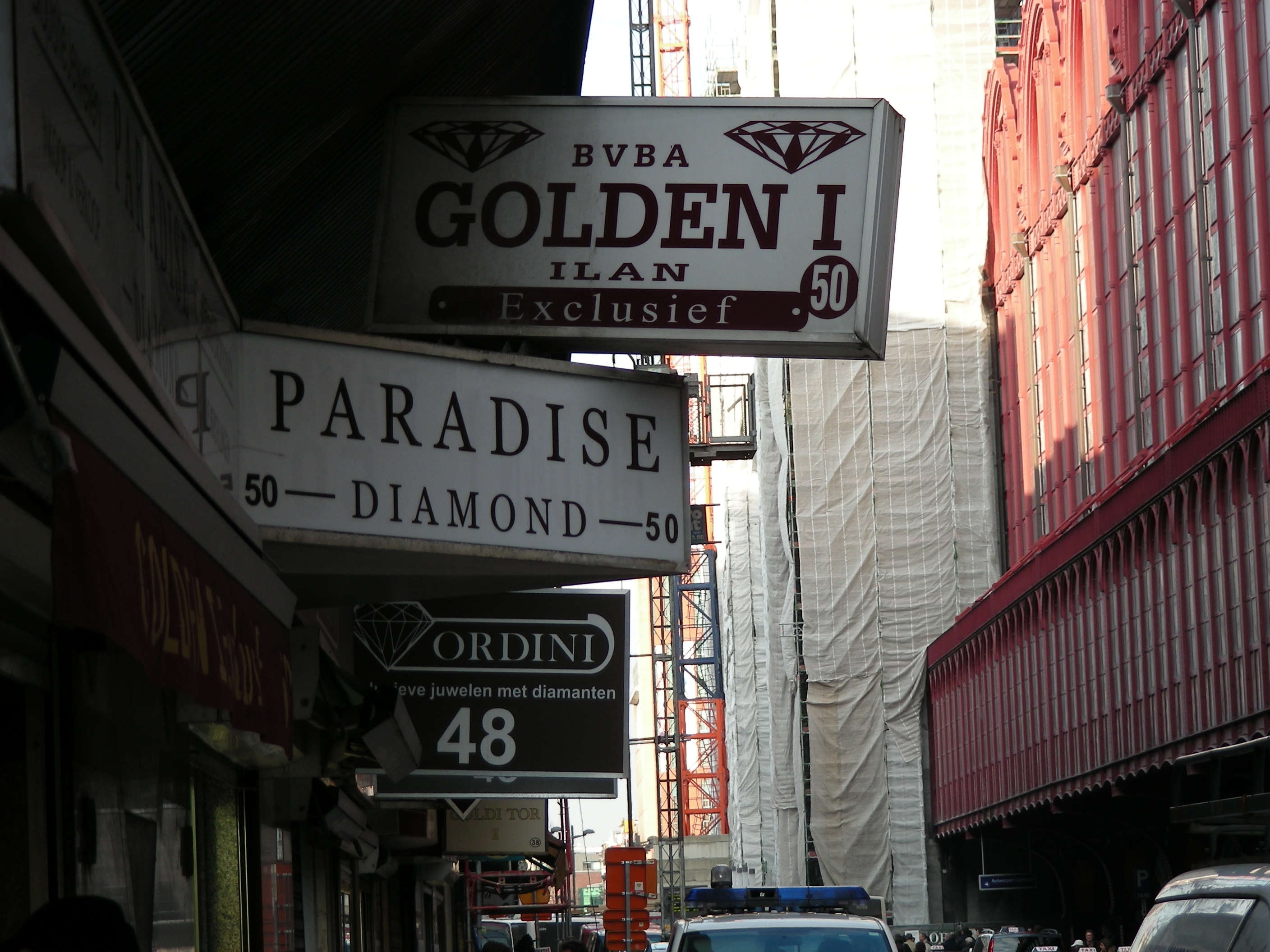
Diamond shops

Antwerp's diamond district, also known as the Diamond Quarter (Diamantkwartier), and dubbed the Square Mile, is an area within the city of Antwerp, Belgium. It consists of several square blocks covering an area of about one square mile. While as of 2012, much of the gem cutting and polishing work historically done in the neighborhood had moved to low wage centers elsewhere, about 84% of the world's rough diamonds passed through the district, making it the largest diamond district. In 2011, it had a turnover of $56 billion dollars. Each year, approximately 50% of the rough diamonds return to Antwerp for cutting and polishing such as The Black Falcon, the world's largest cut diamond.

Over $16 billion in polished diamonds pass through the district's exchanges each year. There are 380 workshops that serve 1,500 companies. There are also 3,500 brokers, merchants and diamond cutters. In 2017, roughly 234 million carats were traded in the district, an area with a workforce of 30,000 people. Over 80% of rough diamonds were purchased in Antwerp.

Within the area is the Antwerp World Diamond Centre, and four trading exchanges including the Diamond Club of Antwerp and the Beurs voor Diamanthandel, both of which were founded by Hasidic diamantaires, the Antwerpsche Diamantkring and the Vrije Diamanthandel.

The neighborhood is dominated by Jewish, Jain Indians, Lebanese Maronite Christian, and Armenian dealers, known as diamantaires. More than 80% of Antwerp's Jewish population works in the diamond trade; Yiddish was, historically, a main language of the diamond exchange. No business is conducted on Saturdays.

=== Tourism ===
Tourism in Belgium is one of Belgium's industries. Its accessibility from elsewhere in Europe makes it a popular tourist destination. The tourist industry generates 2.8% of Belgium's gross domestic product and employs 3.3% of the working population (142,000 people). 6.7 million people travelled to Belgium in 2005. Two-thirds of them come from the larger nearby countries - France, The Netherlands, the United Kingdom, and Germany; there are also many tourists from Spain and Italy.

Like many national institutions in Belgium, the national tourist agencies are split along regional lines with two tourist agencies. They are the Belgian Tourist Office Brussels & Wallonia for the regions of Wallonia and Brussels Capital-Region, and Toerisme Vlaanderen covering Flanders, although it covers Brussels as well.

In 1993, 2% of the total workforce was employed in tourism, less than in many neighbouring countries. Much of the tourism industry is located either on the heavily developed coastline or in the Ardennes. Brussels and the Flemish cities of Bruges, Ghent, Antwerp, Leuven, and Mechelen, the Flemish Cities of Art, attract many cultural tourists. Much tourism in Brussels is business tourism.

Yearly tourist arrivals in millions

Belgium was ranked 21st on the World Economic Forum's 2017 Travel and Tourism Competitiveness report. The country was placed 4th for "health and hygiene" and 6th for "ground and port infrastructure", but only 105th in the world for "price competitiveness" and 122nd for "natural resources". In recent years, the number of international tourists has exponentially grown as key figures shown by Tourisme Vlaanderen.

== Infrastructure ==
=== Energy ===
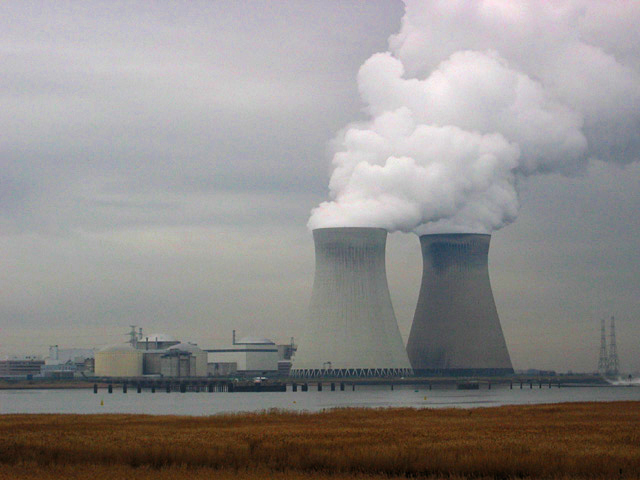
Doel Nuclear Power Station

Energy in Belgium describes energy and electricity production, consumption and import in Belgium.

It is governed by the energy policy of Belgium, which is divided between several levels of government. For example, regional governments are responsible for awarding green certificates (except for offshore wind parks) while the national government is responsible for all nuclear power. As a member country of the European Union Belgium also complies with its energy policy.

Belgium is heavily reliant on aging nuclear reactors and gas-powered generators, although renewables (especially wind power) are generating an increasing percentage of electricity consumed.

The energy plan for Brussels is for it to be carbon neutral by 2050, with emissions down by 40% in 2030, 67% in 2040 and 90% in 2050 compared to 2005. Belgium as a whole has a target of a 55% reduction in emissions by 2030.

==== Electricity ====
Electricity generation in Belgium

Electricity production in Belgium totaled 65.8 TWh in 2025. Nuclear power accounted for 34.2% of generation, followed by natural gas at 18.7%, solar power at 15.3%, onshore wind at 10.3%, and offshore wind at 8.4%. Electricity consumption was 80.1 TWh.

Belgium's federal electricity policy aimed to enhance renewable energy, increase cross-border interconnection capacity, and phase out nuclear power by 2025. A key initiative includes promoting offshore wind energy through competitive auctioning processes. In response to the nuclear phase-out, Belgium is set to introduce between 2.0 and 3.6 gigawatts (GW) of new capacity by 2025.

=== Transport ===
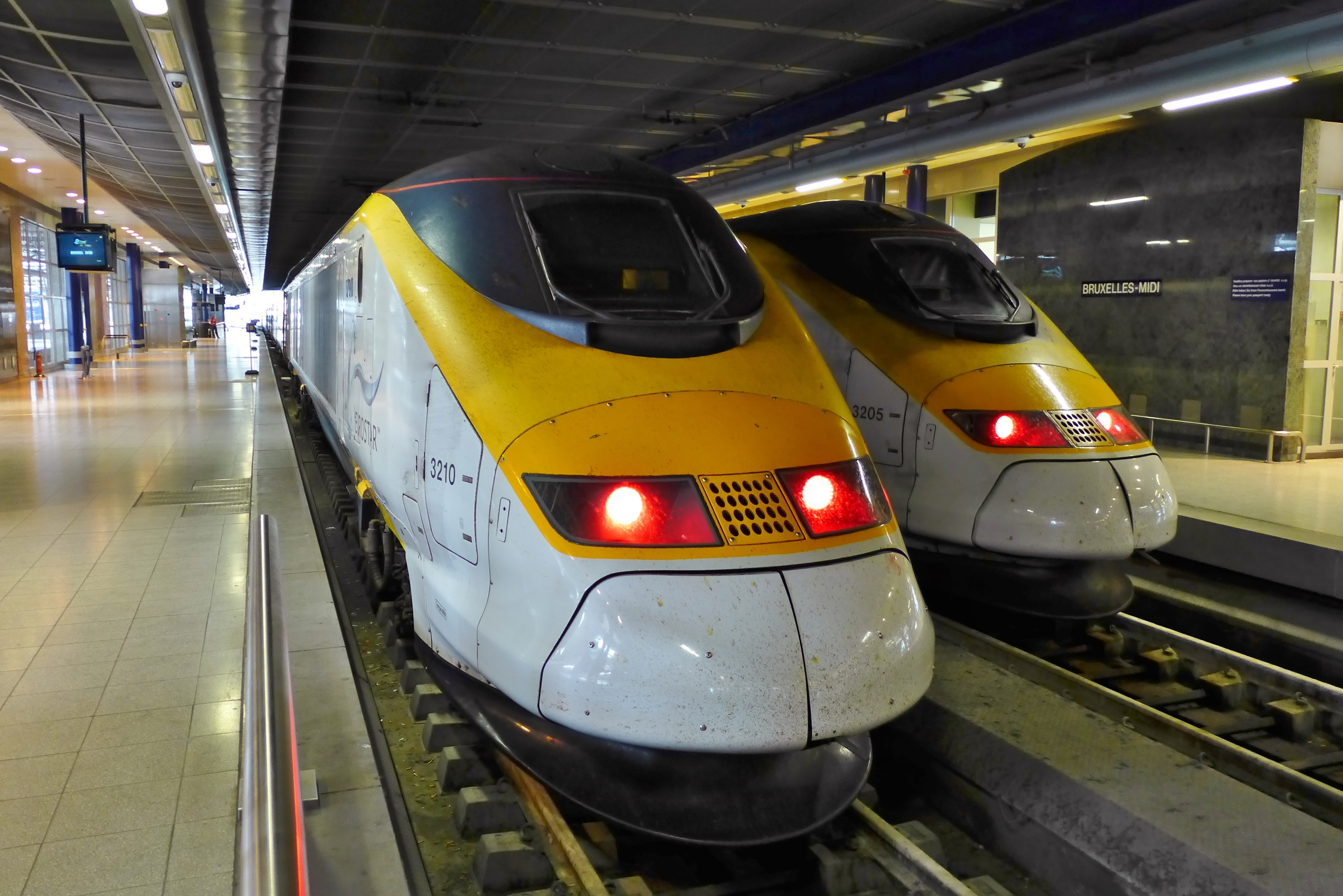
Eurostar trains in Brussel Zuid-Bruxelles Midi station.

Transport in Belgium is facilitated with well-developed road, air, rail and water networks. The rail network has 2,950 km (1,830 mi) of electrified tracks. There are 118,414 km (73,579 mi) of roads, among which there are 1,747 km (1,086 mi) of motorways, 13,892 km (8,632 mi) of main roads and 102,775 km (63,861 mi) of other paved roads. There is also a well-developed urban rail network in Brussels, Antwerp, Ghent and Charleroi. The ports of Antwerp and Zeebrugge are two of the biggest seaports in Europe. Brussels Airport is Belgium's biggest airport.

=== Telecommunications ===
Internet in Belgium has a high level of adoption and engagement, with a 93% uptake rate among individuals as of 2022, higher than the EU average of 89%. The country is on par with the EU average regarding digital skills, with 54% of its population having at least basic digital competencies. Illustrated through initiatives like the BeCentral digital campus, Belgium has created programs to boost digital literacy, and has trained over 425,000 students since 2017 to narrow the digital skills gap.

In 2022, Belgium's fixed broadband adoption, providing speeds of at least 100 Mbps, was 67%, higher than the EU average of 55%. Mobile broadband in Belgium saw growth with the adoption rate reaching 90% in 2021, slightly above the EU average of 87%. Additionally, Belgium advanced in digital public services, exceeding the EU average in several key indicators.

Law enforcement in Belgium does take action against crimes committed on the Internet and filters websites hosting content that is illegal under Belgian law. Individual freedom of expression online is typically not violated by the government unless the expression could be classified as holocaust denial or incitement to hatred.

=== Water supply and sanitation ===
Water supply and sanitation in Belgium is provided by a large variety of organizations: Most of the 581 municipalities of Belgium have delegated the responsibility for water supply and sanitation to regional or inter-municipal utilities. There are more than 62 water supply utilities, including 2 regional, 30 inter-municipal and 30 municipal utilities. Another 100 mostly small municipalities provide services directly without having a legally of financially separate entity for water supply. Water is not scarce in Belgium and water supply is generally continuous and of good quality. However, wastewater treatment has long lagged behind and Brussels only achieved full treatment of its wastewater in 2007. In 2004 the European Court of Justice ruled condemning Belgium's failure to comply with the EU wastewater directive, and the ruling has not been fully complied with so far. Wallonia satisfies 55% of the national needs in drinking water while it counts only 37% of the population. Flanders and Brussels are dependent on drinking water from Wallonia, at a level of 40% and 98% respectively.

An interesting aspect of the Belgian water and sanitation sector is the recognition of a basic right to water. The Walloon and Brussels Regions have set up Social Funds for Water, which provide financial support to people having difficulties to pay their water bill. In Flanders a social tariff, people who qualify only pay 1/5th of the base tariff. Every Flemish person used to have the right to a minimal supply of 15 m^{3} (41 liter/capita/day) of free water per person per year, but this benefit was revoked on January 1, 2016.

The average water tariff in Belgium for large users in 2008 was Euro 8.92 per cubic meter, the second-highest among 14 industrial countries compared in a recent survey. Between 2003 and 2008 water tariffs in Belgium had increased by 80%, the highest increase in that period among all 14 countries.

== Regional differences ==
The economy of Belgium is varied and cannot be understood without taking the regional differences into account. Indeed, the Flemish and Walloon economies differ in many respects (consider for instance Eurostat and OECD statistics), and cities like Brussels, Antwerp, Liège, Bruges, Charleroi, or Ghent also exhibit significant differences. Brussels' GDP per capita is much higher than either region, although this is misleading, as many of those that work in the Brussels-Capital Region live in Flanders or Wallonia. Their output is counted in Brussels and not where they live, artificially raising the per capita GDP of Brussels and slightly lowering that of Flanders and Wallonia.

Unemployment has remained consistently more than twice as high in Wallonia than in Flanders, and has been even higher in Brussels, during most of the last 20 years (2012: Flanders: 4.55%; Wallonia: 10.12% and Brussels: 17.47%).

Gross Domestic Product in Belgium (2022)
Rank	NUTS region	Per capita in Euros	% of EU average
1	Brussels	69,500	196
2	Flemish Region	43,800	124
3	Walloon Region	30,700	87

=== Brussels ===
Being the de facto capital of the European Union, its economy is very service-oriented. It has a number of regional headquarters of multinational corporations. It is also host to a great number of European institutions, in addition to the Belgian federal government, the government of the Flemish Community and the government of the French Community. Brussels also has many commuters, with 230,000 coming from Flanders, and 130,000 from Wallonia. Much of the success of Brussels is based on the high educational skills of its workforce. As of July 2012, however, the statistical unemployment rate in Brussels was 20.6%.

=== Flanders ===
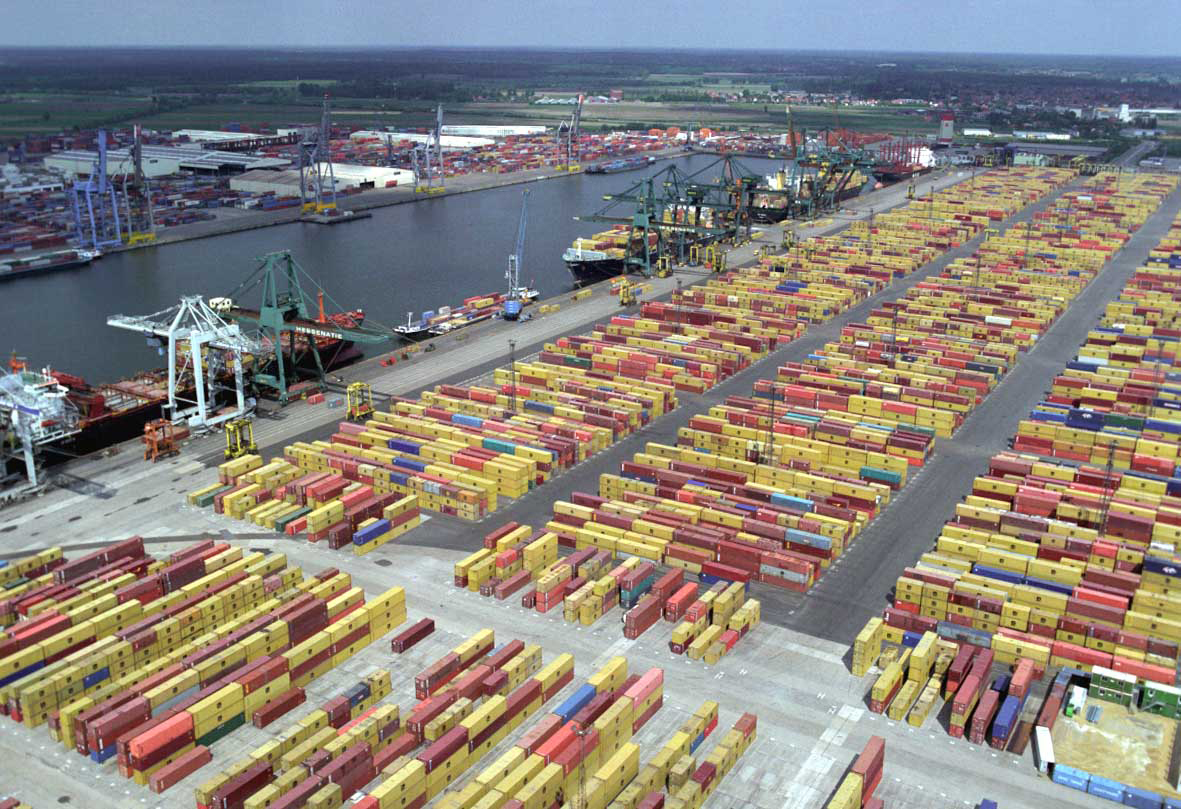
The Bevrijdingsdok container terminal in the port of Antwerp

In 2004, the port of Antwerp was the second-largest European sea port by cargo volume, and the Antwerp freight railway station accounts for one-third of Belgian freight traffic. Antwerp is the first diamond market in the world, diamond exports account for roughly 1/10 of Belgian exports. The Antwerp-based BASF plant is the largest BASF-base outside Germany, and accounts on its own for about 2% of Belgian exports. Other industrial and service activities include car manufacturing, telecommunications, and photographic products.

The port of Bruges-Zeebrugge is one of the most important, modern and fastest growing ports in Europe. It is Europe's largest port for RoRo traffic and natural gas. It also is the world's largest port for the import and export of new vehicles. Tourism is also a major component of the economy of Bruges. Due to its pristine medieval city centre, Bruges has become a popular tourist destination. Annually about 2.5 million day tourists visit the city and in 2007 there were about 1.4 million overnight stays.

The port of Ghent, in the north of the city, is the third-largest port of Belgium. It is accessed by the Ghent–Terneuzen Canal, which ends near the Dutch port of Terneuzen on the Western Scheldt. The port houses, among others, big companies like ArcelorMittal, Volvo Cars, Volvo Trucks, Volvo Parts, Honda, and Stora Enso. Ghent University, the second-largest university of Belgium by number of students, and a number of research-oriented companies are situated in the central and southern part of the city. Tourism is increasingly becoming a major employer in the local area. Begonias have been cultivated in the Ghent area since 1860. Belgium is the world's largest producer of begonias, planting 60 million tubers per year. Eighty percent of the crop is exported.

=== Wallonia ===
In the past, Liège was one of the most important steel-making centres in Europe. Starting in 1817, John Cockerill extensively developed the iron and steel industry. The industrial complex of Seraing was the largest in the world. Although now a shadow of its former self, steel production and the manufacture of steel goods remain important.

Liège has also been an important centre for gunsmithing since the Middle Ages, and the arms industry is still strong with the headquarters of FN Herstal. The economy of the region is now diversified, the most important centers are mechanical industries (aircraft engine and spacecraft propulsion), space technology, information technology, biotechnology and also production of water, beer, and chocolate. Liège Science Park, south-east of the city, near the University of Liège campus, houses spin-offs and high technology businesses. Liège is also a very important logistics center: the city possesses the third-largest river port in Europe, directly connected to Antwerp, Rotterdam and Germany via the Meuse river and the Albert Canal. In 2006, Liège Airport was the 8th most important cargo airport in Europe. A new passenger terminal was opened in 2005. It is also the main hub and the headquarters of TNT Airways.

Charleroi features an industrial area, iron and steel industry, glassworks, chemicals, and electrical engineering. Charleroi is in the center of a vast coal basin, called Pays Noir. Many slag heaps still surround the city. Charleroi is also known for its publishing industry with Dupuis, one of the main publishers of Franco-Belgian comics, located in Marcinelle.

== Trade ==
Exports of Belgium by product category (2019) Chemical products Transportation Machines Mineral products Plastics and rubbers Metals Foodstuffs Precious metals Textiles Instruments Animal products Vegetable products Paper goods Footwear and headwear Miscellaneous Stone and glass Wood products Animal and vegetable bi-products Animal hides Arts and antiques Weapons

About 80% of Belgium's trade is with fellow EU member states. Given this high percentage, it seeks to diversify and expand trade opportunities with non-EU countries. The Belgian authorities are, as a rule, anti-protectionist and try to maintain a hospitable and open trade and investment climate. The European Commission negotiates on trade issues for all member states, which, in turn lessens bilateral trade disputes with Belgium.

The Belgian government encourages new foreign investment as a means to promote employment. With regional devolution, Flanders, Brussels, and Wallonia are now courting potential foreign investors and offer a host of incentives and benefits. Foreign companies in Belgium account for approximately 11% of the total work force, with the U.S.

Attracted by the EU 1992 single-market program, many foreign firms and lawyers have settled in Brussels since 1989.

== Data ==
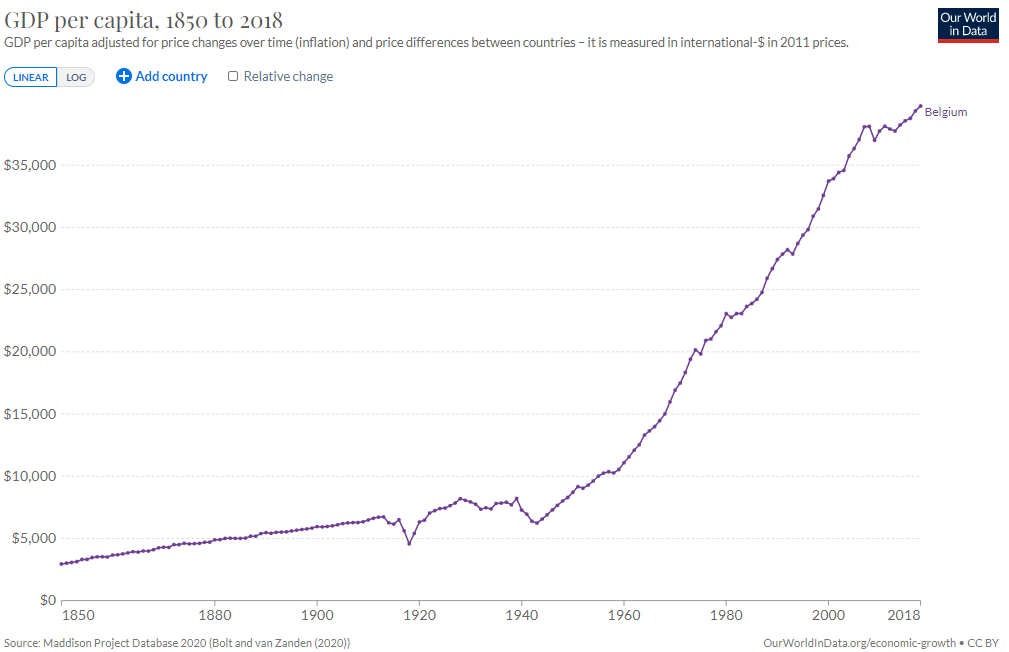
GDP per capita development of Belgium

The following table shows the main economic indicators in 1980–2021 (with IMF staff estimates in 2022–2027). Inflation under 5% is in green.

Year	GDP (in Bil. US$PPP)	GDP per capita (in US$ PPP)	GDP (in Bil. US$nominal)	GDP per capita (in US$ nominal)	GDP growth (real)	Inflation rate (in Percent)	Unemployment (in Percent)	Government debt (in % of GDP)
1980	106.1	10,769.0	123.5	12,529.3	▲4.4%	▲6.7%	8.3%	76.8%
1981	▲115.8	▲11,745.0	▼102.2	▼10,366.1	▼-0.3%	▲7.6%	▲10.0%	▲89.7%
1982	▲123.7	▲12,556.1	▼90.0	▼9,128.6	▲0.6%	▲8.7%	▲11.5%	▲99.6%
1983	▲129.0	▲13,083.9	▼85.0	▼8,626.2	▲0.3%	▲7.7%	▼10.7%	▲110.3%
1984	▲136.9	▲13,897.6	▼81.2	▼8,244.8	▲2.5%	▲6.3%	▲10.8%	▲114.6%
1985	▲143.6	▲14,566.9	▲84.5	▲8,568.7	▲1.7%	▲4.9%	▼10.1%	▲119.4%
1986	▲149.2	▲15,129.2	▲117.1	▲11,873.8	▲1.8%	▲1.3%	10.1%	▲124.7%
1987	▲156.4	▲15,851.6	▲145.4	▲14,740.5	▲2.3%	▲1.6%	▼9.8%	▲129.2%
1988	▲169.5	▲17,166.6	▲158.1	▲16,008.6	▲4.7%	▲1.2%	▼8.8%	▲129.7%
1989	▲182.3	▲18,362.2	▲159.8	▲16,098.2	▲3.5%	▲3.1%	▼7.4%	▼126.4%
1990	▲195.0	▲19,607.2	▲200.1	▲20,119.9	▲3.1%	▲3.5%	▼6.6%	▲130.3%
1991	▲205.3	▲20,560.9	▲205.4	▲20,563.7	▲1.8%	▲3.2%	▼6.5%	▲131.8%
1992	▲213.2	▲21,276.7	▲228.7	▲22,823.0	▲1.5%	▲2.3%	▲7.1%	▲134.7%
1993	▲216.2	▲21,472.2	▼218.7	▼21,723.6	▼-1.0%	▲2.5%	▲8.6%	▲138.9%
1994	▲227.9	▲22,566.2	▲238.6	▲23,624.5	▲3.2%	▲2.4%	▲9.8%	▼137.1%
1995	▲238.3	▲23,519.1	▲288.3	▲28,458.5	▲2.4%	▲1.3%	▼9.7%	▼131.3%
1996	▲245.8	▲24,236.3	▼279.3	▼27,535.3	▲1.3%	▲1.8%	▼9.6%	▼129.0%
1997	▲259.6	▲25,521.1	▼253.0	▼24,878.7	▲3.8%	▲1.5%	▼9.2%	▼124.3%
1998	▲267.6	▲26,257.7	▲258.9	▲25,399.2	▲2.0%	▲0.9%	▲9.3%	▼119.2%
1999	▲281.0	▲27,513.1	▼258.5	▼25,309.1	▲3.5%	▲1.1%	▼8.4%	▼115.4%
2000	▲298.1	▲29,110.0	▼236.9	▼23,136.5	▲3.7%	▲2.7%	▼6.9%	▼109.6%
2001	▲308.1	▲30,021.8	▼236.7	▼23,067.2	▲1.1%	▲2.4%	▼6.6%	▼108.2%
2002	▲318.3	▲30,870.9	▲258.2	▲25,044.3	▲1.7%	▲1.5%	▲7.5%	▼105.4%
2003	▲327.9	▲31,665.3	▲318.0	▲30,707.7	▲1.0%	▲1.5%	▲8.2%	▼101.7%
2004	▲348.7	▲33,545.0	▲369.0	▲35,497.6	▲3.6%	▲1.9%	▲8.4%	▼97.2%
2005	▲368.0	▲35,232.8	▲385.9	▲36,945.5	▲2.3%	▲2.5%	▲8.5%	▼95.1%
2006	▲389.1	▲37,014.5	▲408.3	▲38,841.8	▲2.6%	▲2.3%	▼8.3%	▼91.5%
2007	▲414.3	▲39,140.3	▲471.0	▲44,496.8	▲3.7%	▲1.8%	▼7.5%	▼87.3%
2008	▲424.1	▲39,760.0	▲517.3	▲48,493.1	▲0.4%	▲4.5%	▼7.0%	▲93.2%
2009	▼418.2	▼38,891.8	▼482.7	▼44,892.2	▼-2.0%	▲0.0%	▲8.0%	▲100.2%
2010	▲435.4	▲40,162.4	▼481.8	▼44,448.2	▲2.9%	▲2.3%	▲8.4%	▲100.3%
2011	▲451.9	▲41,082.4	▲523.2	▲47,564.4	▲1.7%	▲3.4%	▼7.2%	▲103.5%
2012	▲469.7	▲42,409.3	▼496.5	▼44,824.2	▲0.7%	▲2.6%	▲7.7%	▲104.8%
2013	▲487.3	▲43,755.2	▲521.8	▲46,848.6	▲0.5%	▲1.2%	▲8.6%	▲105.5%
2014	▲503.6	▲45,043.2	▲535.5	▲47,897.0	▲1.6%	▲0.5%	▲8.7%	▲107.0%
2015	▲521.0	▲46,365.2	▼462.4	▼41,147.3	▲2.0%	▲0.6%	8.7%	▼105.2%
2016	▲550.6	▲48,679.7	▲475.9	▲42,076.4	▲1.3%	▲1.8%	▼7.9%	▼105.0%
2017	▲575.8	▲50,726.6	▲502.6	▲44,274.1	▲1.6%	▲2.2%	▼7.2%	▼102.0%
2018	▲600.5	▲52,678.4	▲543.6	▲47,689.5	▲1.8%	▲2.3%	▼6.0%	▼99.8%
2019	▲624.1	▲54,481.0	▼535.4	▼46,740.5	▲2.1%	▲1.2%	▼5.5%	▼97.7%
2020	▼595.7	▼51,703.3	▼521.3	▼45,238.7	▼-5.7%	▲0.4%	▲5.8%	▲112.8%
2021	▲659.3	▲57,054.5	▲599.1	▲51,849.3	▲6.2%	▲3.2%	▲6.3%	▼108.4%
2022	▲723.1	▲62,065.1	▼589.5	▼50,597.9	▲2.4%	▲9.5%	▼5.4%	▼103.9%
2023	▲751.7	▲64,125.3	▲596.7	▲50,906.1	▲0.4%	▲4.9%	▲5.6%	▲105.1%
2024	▲778.3	▲66,336.5	▲619.3	▲52,786.0	▲1.4%	▲1.8%	5.6%	▲107.2%
2025	▲802.1	▲68,219.2	▲642.3	▲54,627.8	▲1.2%	▲1.7%	5.6%	▲109.7%
2026	▲827.5	▲70,140.6	▲666.5	▲56,487.1	▲1.2%	▲1.7%	▼5.5%	▲112.3%
2027	▲853.6	▲72,111.5	▲690.7	▲58,351.9	▲1.2%	▲1.7%	5.5%	▲115.1%

== Companies ==
In 2022, the sector with the highest number of companies registered in Belgium is the Services sector with 433,375 companies, followed by Finance, Insurance, and Real Estate with 169,544 companies.

== See also ==
- Agriculture in Flanders
- Commemorative coins of Belgium
- ISPA Belgium
- List of largest companies in Belgium
- Science and technology in Belgium
