= Agriculture in Flanders =

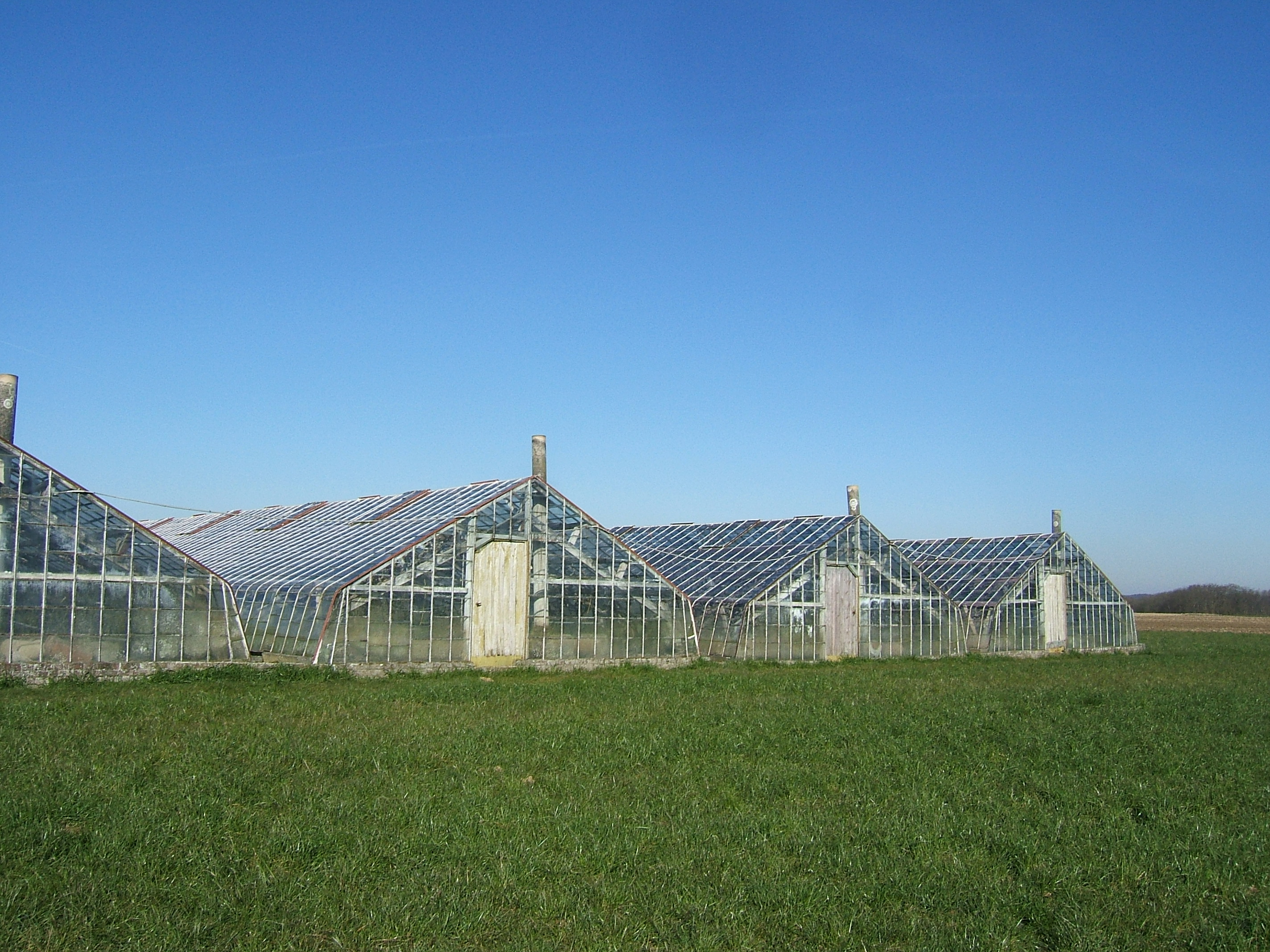
Greenhouses for grapes in Flemish Brabant

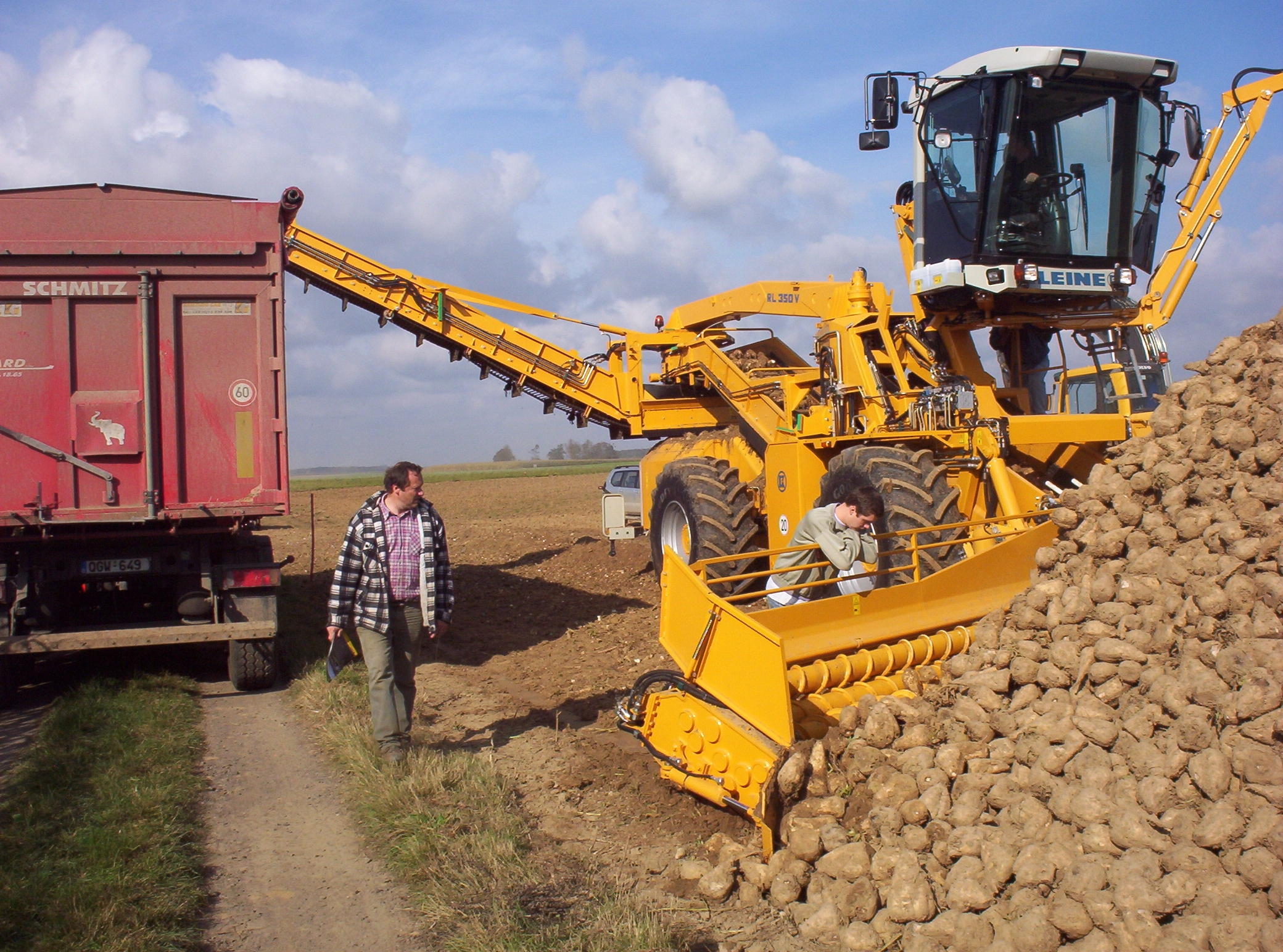
Harvest of sugar beets in Tienen

Agriculture and horticulture in Flanders has traditionally a familial character, but just like agriculture in other regions, is increasingly characterised by an increase in scale, modernisation and expansion. In Flanders, intensive sectors constitute the largest segment of agriculture: pig breeding, poultry and dairy farming, vegetables and fruit, and ornamental plant culture. In Wallonia, the French-speaking part of Belgium, the emphasis is more on arable farming and extensive soil-based cattle breeding.

== Structural aspects ==
In 2013, there were 24,884 agricultural businesses in Flanders. Over the last ten years, the number has declined by 30%. That is a decrease of almost 4% per year. At the same time there was a continual increase in scale. In comparison to 2004, the average arable area per business has increased by 40% to 25 hectares. The livestock population per business is increasing as well. Nowadays an average cattle business counts 119 animals, a pig business 1,848 and a poultry business 47,092. Over the last ten years, the total arable area has remained relatively stable (-1.7%). 46% of the Flemish arable area, or 622,738 ha, is utilised for agriculture and horticulture. Meadows, pasturelands, and fodder crops account for 56% of the total area. The arable surface is 36% owned, the rest is on lease.

The agriculture is characterized by a strong degree of specialization. Almost nine out of ten companies specialize in one of three subsectors. 54% of the companies have a specialization in cattle breeding, 21% in arable crops, and 13% in horticulture.

In 2013, organic farming utilised a cultivated area of 5 065 ha in Flanders, 0.8% of the total arable area. The number of organic farms amounts to 319 units. Over the last years, the cultivated area and the number of holdings has steadily increased, in part under the impulse of the Strategic Action Plan for Organic Agriculture, from which the second programme is running from 2013 to 2017.

== Economic importance ==
In 2013, the final production value of the Flemish agricultural and horticultural sectors’ sales activity was estimated at 5,5 billion euros. Of the total production value, livestock is good for 65%, horticulture 26% and arable farming 9%. The five most important agricultural products are pork (1,46 billion euros), dairy products (844 million euros), beef (712 million euros), vegetables (602 million euros) and ornamental horticulture products (512 million euros).

In 2013, 51,583 people were regularly employed in agriculture and horticulture. Because there are great many non-regular employees working in agriculture, such as seasonal workers and contractors, we count that figure among the full-time workers. Flemish agriculture and horticulture employs 41,141 full-time workers, or on average 1.65 per business. 34% of the full-time workers work in livestock businesses (dairy, pork, beef and poultry) 32% in horticultural businesses, 13% in arable crops businesses and 19% in mixed businesses.

In 2012, the gross value added of the primary sector (including forestry and fishery) had a 0.9% share in the total Flemish gross value added. In the European Union the average share is 1.7%.

In 2013, the total Belgian trade in agricultural products recorded a positive trade balance. Export is good for 39.4 billion euros, while import amounts to 34.5 billion euros. Some important export products are chocolate products (2.1 billion euros), potato preparations and pork (each 1.4 billion), beer and frozen vegetables (each 1.1 billion). Belgium has an 8% share of total agricultural exports from the EU-28 and thus holds the fifth place in the EU ranking, after Germany, the Netherlands, France and Spain. Flanders takes in account 80% of the Belgian agricultural exports.

== Regional distribution ==
The importance of the agricultural sector in Flanders depends on the region. Aclassification of municipalities with similar agricultural activity shows the typical regions: fruit around Sint-Truiden and vegetables around Sint-Katelijne-Waver, Roeselare and Hoogstraten. Ornamental horticulture is practiced around Ghent. Pig breeding makes its home in West Flanders, Meetjesland, Waasland and the Campine. Dairy cattle is important in the Flemish Ardennes and Pajottenland, and in combination with breeding in the Campine. Cattle are primarily found in the region around Bruges, the southern parts of West and East Flanders and in combination with arable farming in Flemish Brabant and South Limburg.

The explanation for this variation is found in history and in factors of soil physics. Breeding farms have installed themselves in the immediate vicinity of the mixed feed industry and the slaughterhouses. Vegetable and fruit cultivation is concentrated around the auction and its derivative industry. Arable farming primarily occurs on rich soils and cattle breeding on poorer soils.

== Agriculture and environment ==
To get an idea of the eco-efficiency of Flemish agriculture we compare pressure indicators to an economic indicator. In the period 2007-2012 the final production remains more or less stable, while the environmental indicators evolve. As to the emission of very fine particles, the phosphorus fertilizer use and the pressure by chemical pesticides, the eco-efficiency improves thanks to the manure policy, rising fertilizer prices and the switch to natural gas in horticulture. In contrast, the increasing livestock from 2008 and the increasing number of cogeneration plants (combined heat and power) in greenhouses are the main reasons that there is no decrease in energy consumption, greenhouse gas emissions and potential acidifying emissions.

In 2012, the net primary energy use by the agricultural sector amounts to 24 916 TJ. Greenhouse horticulture remains with 46% the largest energy user. The share of natural gas increased from 21% in 2007 to 58% in 2012 while the share of oil in that period drops to 35%. Heavy fuel oil is completely faded away, from 21% to 2%. Since 2010, the Flemish agricultural sector is a net producer of electricity. The excess of self-produced electricity from its own cogeneration or solar panels is in practice put back on the net and is not necessarily used by the agricultural sector.

The share of agriculture in the total Flemish greenhouse gas emissions is 10% in 2011. The relatively large share of agriculture is due to the fact that 53% of nitrous oxide emissions and 76% of methane emissions come from agriculture. Both gases have a much bigger greenhouse effect than carbon dioxide. In 2011, total emissions of greenhouse gases from agriculture amounted to 8 636 kt CO_{2} equivalents, a decrease of 19% compared to 1990. However, since 2008 the emissions increased again by 3.5%. Methane emissions are primarily derived from digestion processes from livestock farming. Nitrous oxide emission is largely directly from the soil.

The exact contribution of Flemish agricultural emissions to total air PM concentrations and to negative health effects is not well known.

== Agricultural policy ==
The agricultural and food sector is, through various complex interactions, connected with the rest of the economy. Further globalization profoundly affects the sector. Other international developments affect agriculture in Flanders, too: the growing world population, climate change, the depletion of fossil fuels and non-renewable raw materials, price fluctuations of food products, the policy concerning genetically modified organisms. In the future, the agricultural sector will also be confronted with an increasing liberalisation of world trade and globalisation of food chains.

The reformed Common Agricultural Policy for the period 2014-2020 is strongly linked to the overall Europe 2020 strategy for smart, sustainable and inclusive growth. The CAP is aiming for increased competitiveness, improved sustainability and increased efficiency. The aid will be distributed differently between and within EU Member States. Direct aid will be 'greener' by introducing three mandatory greening practices. The importance of rural development increases.

In 2013, Flemish farmers received 258.8 million euros in direct support. Entitlement rights were good for 228.2 million euros of this amount, and the suckler cow premium for 27.3 million euros. With 23%, dairy farming had in the period 2007-2012 the greatest share of direct support. A significant part goes to beef cattle farming and arable crops. The business types pigs and horticulture traditionally receive little or no direct support. For the overall agricultural and horticultural sector, the share of direct support in the farm income is on average 24%.

In 2013, there were 115.2 million euros in government subsidies for the Rural Development Programme in Flanders. In the period 2007-2013, 67% of the budget went to the improvement of competitiveness (mainly investments in farms), 20% to the improvement of the environment (especially agri-environmental measures such as water management agreements) and 9% to the quality of life in rural areas. The sectors pigs and poultry, dairy and horticulture received most Pillar 2 support.

== Social aspects ==
The Boerenbond is the major representative farmers' union in Flanders.

The average age of operators of professional agricultural businesses has risen in recent years from 48 years in 2004 to 52 years in 2013. 11% of the farmers are women. Female farmers are on average one and a half years older than the male. Increasing age is associated with the small number of young farmers. In 2013, only 5% of the farmers were under 35 years old, both male and female farmers. The proportion of over-65s is significantly higher: 11% of men and 17% of women. The major part of the operators is between 50 and 55 years. Ten years ago it was between 40 and 45 years.

A survey conducted in 2012 among the participants of the Farm Accountancy Data Network showed that the average satisfaction of the farmers is 6.5 out of ten. 64% of respondents were satisfied or very satisfied, 25% are moderately satisfied and 11% dissatisfied. A relatively higher satisfaction prevails in the arable sector. In the pig sector, respondents appeared relatively less satisfied. A sore point is stress, because 52% of respondents are complaining about high to very high stress. The average income satisfaction is also only 4.5 out of ten.

Some farm families are facing serious financial difficulties or mental health and relationship problems. The number of farmers in distress who come to the association Farmers at a Crossroads (Boeren op een Kruispunt) is hovering around 200 applicants each year.

== Innovation ==
Innovation is of great importance for the economic development of agriculture and horticulture in Flanders. Innovation helps to maintain competitiveness, but can also meet global challenges such as feeding the growing world population, the supply of adequate fiber, biomass and bio-materials and the limited availability of natural resources.

A survey carried out in 2014 among the LMN farmers shows that 43% of the businesses carried through an innovation on the farm in the past two years. This percentage is highest in the horticultural sector (52%) and lowest in cattle (35%). In horticulture, ornamental plants sector has with 62% the highest proportion of innovative businesses.

The results show that process innovations are most prevalent. More than half of the companies mainly invests in machinery and infrastructure such as sheds and greenhouses, followed by innovations in marketing, such as the switch to another distribution channel or the start with various forms of short-chain sales. In third place come organizational innovations, such as the recruitment of additional workers, the takeover by a new manager and the adaptation of the legal structure.

== Agriculture within the agro-business complex ==
The agricultural sector does not stand alone, but is a part of a much broader agro-business complex. Alongside the agricultural and horticultural sectors, an important role is also played by agricultural suppliers, the food industry and distribution. The trend is that a decreasing number of businesses generate an increasing turnover and value added. According to the latest figures, the Flemish agro-business complex counts 35 471 businesses, achieves a turnover of 61 billion euro and a value added of 8.4 billion euro, and employs 159 104 people. The food industry is the largest employer and is responsible for the largest share of turnover and net added value.

A major problem for agriculture is the price-making The farmer is faced with rising commodity prices which makes production more expensive. Input prices, costs for energy, feed and machinery, exhibit both in Belgium and the EU on an upward trend. On the revenue side, there are more volatile and lower selling prices. That price volatility is partly due to the reduction of the market support at European level, making farms to become more sensitive to developments in the global market. On the other hand, the primary sector must withstand consolidated chain links such as processing and distribution. Their power is magnified by scale and concentration.

== See also ==
- Economy of Belgium

== Literature ==
- Agency for Agriculture and Fisheries (2024) Agriculture report 2024 (LARA). Flemish agriculture in figures, Brussels.
- Bernaerts E. (2014) Productierekening van de Vlaamse land- en tuinbouw 2014, Department of Agriculture and Fisheries, Division for Agricultural Policy Analysis, Brussels.
- Bral L. (ed.) (2014) Vlaamse Regionale Indicatoren 2014, Research Centre of the Flemish Government, Brussels.
- Danckaert S., Lenders S. & Oeyen A. (2009) De landbouwactiviteit in Vlaamse gemeenten, proeve van typologie, Department of Agriculture and Fisheries, Division for Agricultural Policy Analysis, Brussels.
- Dumez L. (2014) Vlaams Programma voor Plattelandsontwikkeling 2007-2013, Jaarverslag 2013, Department of Agriculture and Fisheries, Division for Agricultural Policy Analysis, Brussels.
- Focke R. (2014) Jaarverslag 2013, vzw Boeren op een Kruispunt.
- Janssens R. (2014) De buitenlandse handel in land- en tuinbouwproducten: stand van zaken in 2013, Department of Agriculture and Fisheries, Division for Agricultural Policy Analysis, Brussels.
- Lenders S., D’hooghe J. &. Tacquenier B. (2013) Gebruik van energie, gewasbescherming, water en kunstmest in de Vlaamse landbouw. Resultaten op basis van het Landbouwmonitoringsnetwerk 2005-2011, Department of Agriculture and Fisheries, Division for Agricultural Policy Analysis, Brussels.
- Lenders S., Oeyen A., D’hooghe J. & Overloop S. (2012) Bodembalans van de Vlaamse landbouw, cijfers voor 2007-2009, Department of Agriculture and Fisheries, Division for Agricultural Policy Analysis, in collaboration with The Flemish Environment Agency, Brussels.
- Maertens E., Bernaerts E., Oeyen A. & Tacquenier B. (2013) Economische resultaten van de Vlaamse land- en tuinbouw 2011-2012, Department of Agriculture and Fisheries, Division for Agricultural Policy Analysis, Brussels.
- Mahy L., Verspecht A., Van Huylenbroeck G. & Buysse J. (2014) Economische en politieke ontwikkelingen op internationaal vlak. Land- en tuinbouw in breder perspectief. Achtergronddocument bij het Landbouwrapport 2014, Department of Agriculture and Fisheries, Division for Agricultural Policy Analysis, Brussels.
- Mathijs E. (KU Leuven), Nevens F. (VITO) & Vandenbroeck P. (shiftN) (2012) Transition to a sustainable agro-food system in Flanders: a system analysis, MIRA and AMS, Brussel.
- Platteau J., Van Gijseghem D.& Van Bogaert T (eds.) (2014) Landbouwrapport 2014, Departement Landbouw en Visserij, Brussel.
- Platteau J. & Van Bogaert T. (eds.) (2014) Agriculture Horticulture 2013 Flanders, Department of Agriculture and Fisheries, Brussels.
- Samborski V., Van Bellegem L. & Platteau J. (2014) De biologische landbouw. Stand van zaken 2013, Department of Agriculture and Fisheries, Division for Agricultural Policy Analysis, Brussels.
- Samborski V. (2013) Het Vlaamse agrovoedingscomplex. Stand van zaken, Department of Agriculture and Fisheries, Division for Agricultural Policy Analysis, Brussels.
- Van Buggenhout E., Vuylsteke A., Deuninck J. & Van Gijseghem D. (2013) Boer(in) in hoofd, hart en nieren. Onderzoek naar sociale duurzaamheid in de Vlaamse land- en tuinbouw anno 2012, Department of Agriculture and Fisheries, Division for Agricultural Policy Analysis, Brussels.
- Van Steertegem M. (ed.) (2013) MIRA Indicatorrapport 2012, Environmental Report Flanders, The Flemish Environment Agency.
- Vuylsteke A., Bergen D. & Demuynck E. (2014) Schaalgrootte en schaalvergroting in de Vlaamse land- en tuinbouw, Department of Agriculture and Fisheries, Division for Agricultural Policy Analysis, Brussels.
- Vuylsteke A. & Van Gijseghem D. (2014)Innovatie in de Vlaamse land- en tuinbouw. Resultaten 2014 van het Landbouwmonitoringsnetwerk, Department of Agriculture and Fisheries, Division for Agricultural Policy Analysis, Brussels.
