= ISPA Belgium =

The Internet Service Providers Association (ISPA) is a Belgian trade association composed of access, hosting, service, and transit providers that advocates for the Internet sector in Belgium. The association currently consists of 25 members that have a public price list in Belgium for offering Internet or other IP services. The creation date is May 30th, 1997

ISPA Belgium is the Belgian member of EuroISPA, a pan-European association of ISPAs.

== Statistics ==
Every quarter, ISPA publishes a quarterly market survey with statistics of residential and business connections in Belgium.
