= Water supply and sanitation in Belgium =

Data
- Water coverage (broad definition): 100%
- Sanitation coverage (broad definition): 100%
- Continuity of supply: Continuous
- Average water use (L/person/day): 106 in 2005
- Average urban water and sanitation tariff (US$/m^{3}): 2.92 Euro/m3 (2006), incl. sanitation
- Share of self-financing by utilities: High
- Share of tax-financing: Low
- Share of external financing: Zero

Institutions
- Decentralization to municipalities: Partial
- Water and sanitation regulator: None
- Sector law: None

Water supply and sanitation in Belgium is provided by a large variety of organizations: Most of the 581 municipalities of Belgium have delegated the responsibility for water supply and sanitation to regional or inter-municipal utilities. There are more than 62 water supply utilities, including 2 regional, 30 inter-municipal and 30 municipal utilities. Another 100 mostly small municipalities provide services directly without having a legally of financially separate entity for water supply. Water is not scarce in Belgium and water supply is generally continuous and of good quality. However, wastewater treatment has long lagged behind and Brussels only achieved full treatment of its wastewater in 2007. In 2004 the European Court of Justice ruled condemning Belgium's failure to comply with the EU wastewater directive, and the ruling has not been fully complied with so far. Wallonia satisfies 55% of the national needs in drinking water while it counts only 37% of the population. Flanders and Brussels are dependent on drinking water from Wallonia, at a level of 40% and 98% respectively.

An interesting aspect of the Belgian water and sanitation sector is the recognition of a basic right to water. The Walloon and Brussels Regions have set up Social Funds for Water, which provide financial support to people having difficulties to pay their water bill. In Flanders a social tariff, people who qualify only pay 1/5th of the base tariff. Every Flemish person used to have the right to a minimal supply of 15 m^{3} (41 liter/capita/day) of free water per person per year, but this benefit was revoked on January 1, 2016.

The average water tariff in Belgium for large users in 2008 was Euro 8.92 per cubic meter, the second-highest among 14 industrial countries compared in a recent survey. Between 2003 and 2008 water tariffs in Belgium had increased by 80%, the highest increase in that period among all 14 countries.

== Water resources ==
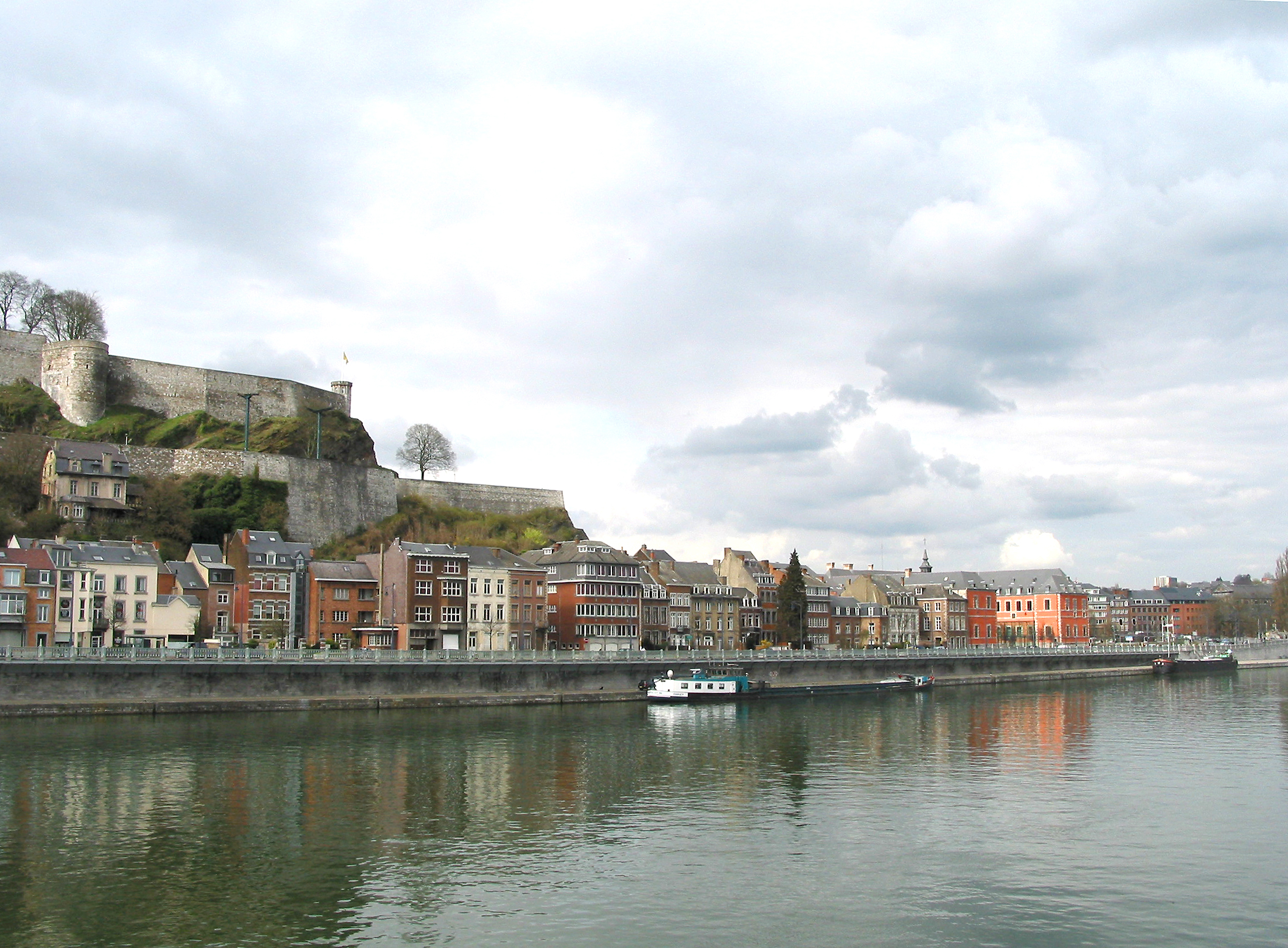
The Meuse, shown here at Namur, is one of Belgium's main water resources. The river provides 30% of Brussel's water supply.

Belgium's water resources are distributed among five river basins, the two main ones being the Meuse and the Scheldt that both take their source in France and flow into the sea in the Netherlands. The major aquifers are located in Wallonia. Belgium does not face water stress, despite its high density of population. Internal water availability is around 12,000 million m^{3}/year (average 1990–2004), or 1,168 m^{3}/capita/year. The yield of groundwater is around 900 million m^{3}, exploited at a rate of 75%. This picture hides strong regional disparities, with the North dependent from the South. Wallonia satisfies 55% of the national needs in drinking water while it counts only 37% of the population. Flanders and Brussels are dependent on drinking water from Wallonia, at a level of 40% and 98% respectively. The picture is complicated by the strong dependence of the Netherlands on the water of the Meuse for its drinking water production.

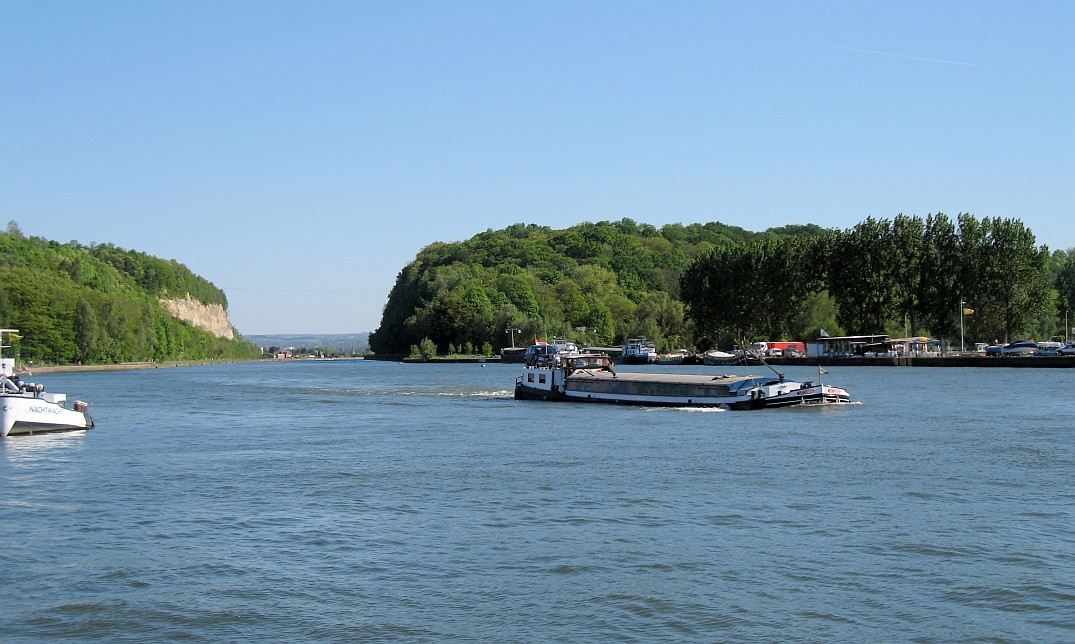
The Albert Canal, shown here near Kanne, Limburg, is an important source for drinking water supply for Antwerp, Belgium's second largest city

Drinking water production withdraws 707 million m^{3} in 2005 (10% of the total withdrawals), 65% produced from groundwater, often distributed without prior treatment, and 35% from surface water, more expensive to produce. For example, Brussels receives its water from springs, groundwater and the Meuse, all located in Wallonia. Modave in the Hoyoux valley, located more than 100 km Southwest of Brussels, produces about 20% of the capital's water supply from galleries in the hills surrounding the valley. In Mons surface water from the Meuse is treated to provide another 30% of the city's water needs; in Vedrin, part of Namur, water is pumped from an abandoned pyrite mine; springs in Genappe, wells in Waterloo and Zaventem, and mines in Ligny and Écaussinnes provide the remainder of Brussel's water supply. The city of Antwerp is supplied with water from the Albert Canal. The city of Liège is supplied from wells pumping from the Hesbaye aquifer.

Distribution losses are estimated at 13%. According to some sources residential water consumption was 106 liter/capita/day, while other sources say it was 135 liter/capita/day in 2003, down from 171 liter/capita/day in 1995.

== Infrastructure ==
In 2005 the length of the drinking water network was 101,026 km with 4 million connections. In 2001 Belgium had 511 wastewater treatment plants serving 6.6 m inhabitants. 90% of the population was connected to sewers and 47% of the population had its wastewater treated in a public wastewater treatment plant. In 2003 the number of wastewater treatment plants had increased to 541.

== History and recent developments ==
=== Attempt at creating basin agencies ===
Before World War II, Belgian policymakers focused on drinking water supply with little emphasis on sanitation. The national water company Société Nationale de Distribution d'Eau (SNDE) or Nationale Maatschappij der Waterleidingen was set up in 1923 to provide water supply where municipalities did not have the ability to do so on their own. After the war the emphasis moved to the management of wastewater with an initial focus on industries. In 1963, authorities admitted that there was a lack of implementation and the institutional arrangement was redesigned: Through the law of 1967 on the regulation of non-navigable rivers and the laws of 1971 on the protection of surface and groundwater the Central State attempted to reinforce its competence to the detriment of the municipalities. The Minister of Public Health promoted the creation of three public companies of purification responsible of the collective systems of purification and with a power of advice on industrial discharges in surface water. The territory of the companies corresponded to three water basins (the Coast, Meuse and Scheldt), and not to the three Belgian regions. This design did not anticipate the federalisation process launched in 1970. Implementation thus failed once again: The laws on the protection of groundwater and surface water have not been implemented and the purification companies have functionally created.

=== The regionalization of policy and institutions ===
The Regions start to develop their own water policy from 1974 onwards. Intercommunales were created in Wallonia since 1977. In the 1980s the first regional water decrees focus on the protection of potential drinking water. The SNDE breaks apart in the early 1980s, splitting into the Société Wallonne des Distributions d'Eau (SWDE) renamed Société wallonne des eaux and the Vlaamse Maatschappij voor Watervoorziening (VMW), renamed De Watergroep According to The Evolution of the Natural Water Regime in Belgium, "[t]he different regional water regimes end up being very dissimilar, as they are inspired by different models from abroad (France and the Netherlands)."

=== Lagging behind on wastewater treatment ===
The 1994 European directive on wastewater raises the pressure on Member States to act on wastewater treatment. Despite major efforts undertaken in this respect, Belgium lagged behind in its implementation of the directive. In 2000 the European Commission observed that the Flanders Region has failed to identify sensitive areas correctly, that the Walloon Region has failed to apply the treatment requirements for urban waste waters discharged into sensitive areas, that both the Brussels and Walloon Regions have failed to provide the Commission with adequate implementation programs and that all the Belgian Regions have failed to ensure that appropriate collection and treatment systems have been established. In 2004 the European Court of Justice ruled condemning Belgium's failure to comply with the wastewater directive in that 114 settlements in Flanders, 60 in Wallonia and Brussels-Capital had either no wastewater collection systems or did not ensure that wastewaters were made subject to specific phosphorus and nitrogen treatment before being discharged into the natural environment.

=== Case study:Wastewater treatment in Brussels ===
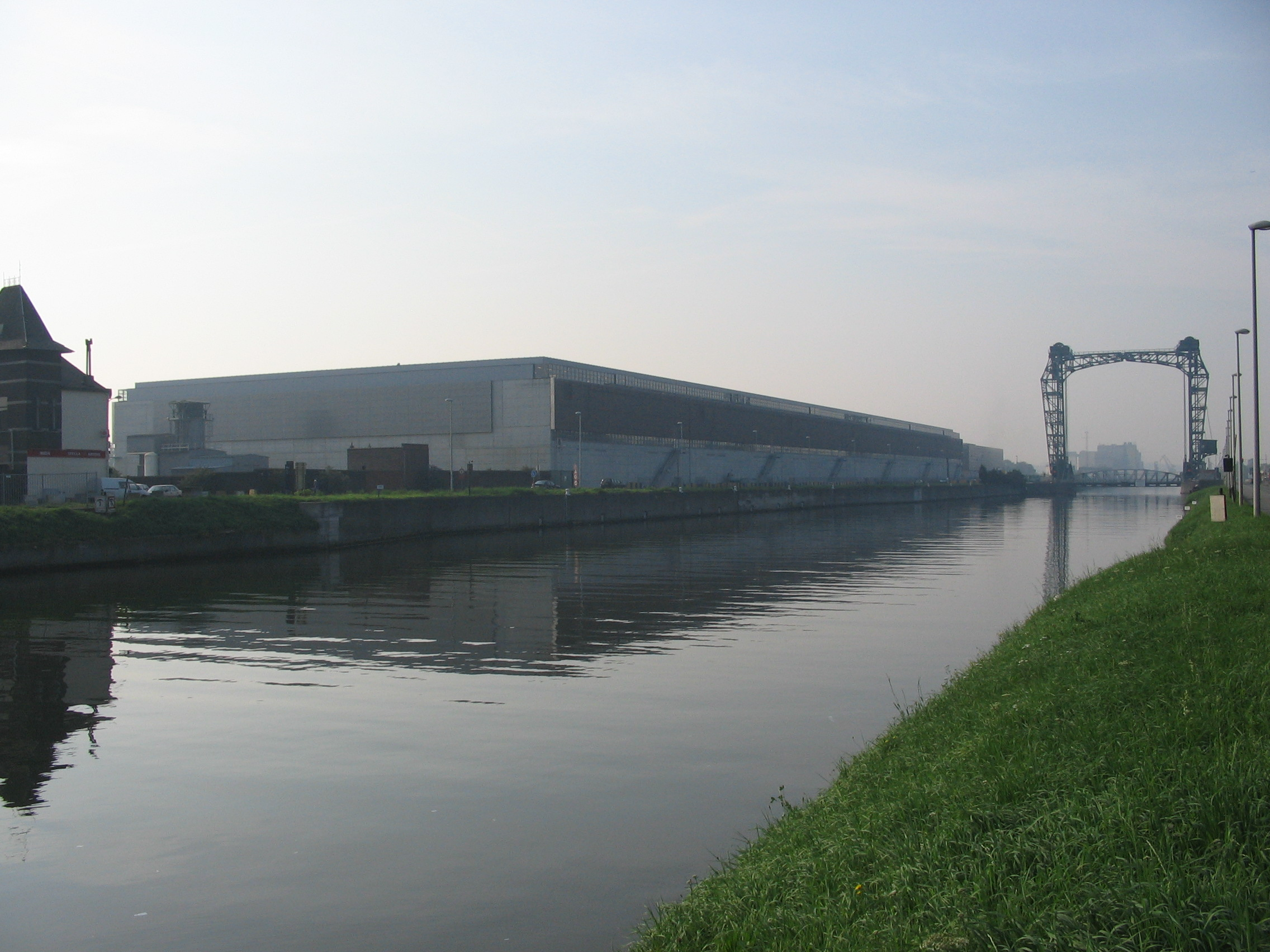
The Brussels-North wastewater treatment plant, before its 2007 completion (September 2006)

The Brussels-Capital Region is part of the Senne basin, itself being part of the Scheldt (Escaut) basin. The Senne, which had become a heavily polluted drain, was covered at the end of the 19th century when parts of the river disappeared under boulevards. During the 1950s it was completely covered, with a mixture of storm water and untreated wastewater being discharged into the environment until 2007. To remedy this situation, a wastewater management plan was put together in the 1980s and early 1990s by the Brussels and Flanders regions. It foresaw the construction of two wastewater treatment plants, one in the South and the other in the North. The Brussels-South wastewater treatment plant, situated between Anderlecht and Forest, came into service in July 2000. It treats about a third of the Brussels's wastewater. A 20-year Built-Operate Transfer contract for the larger Brussels-North wastewater treatment plant was awarded to Acquiris, a consortium led by Veolia Water, in 2001. The plant was completed in March 2007 and discharges into the Brussels–Scheldt Maritime Canal.

=== Introducing the basic right to water ===
Flemish Region. Since 1997, the Flemish Region has recognised that "every customer is entitled to a basic uninterrupted supply of [...] water for household purposes in order to be able to live decently according to prevailing living standards".

Walloon region. Since 2003, the right to equitable access to water for everyone has been a point of Walloon law, with a tax of 0,0125 euros/m^{3} going into a Social Fund set up to help pay for water for those in francophone areas who cannot afford it. There was no assistance provided for communities speaking German. In 2008, the IELRC reported that Wallonia was also "in the process of introducing a new water tax to finance water projects in selected developing countries".

Belgian constitution. If a 2006 proposal before the Belgian Senate is passed, the Constitution of Belgium will be amended with a new paragraph on Article 23 recognising a constitutional "right to an adequate water supply, sufficient in quality and quantity".

== Responsibility for service provision ==
Belgium is a Federal State composed by three regions: the Flemish region, the Walloon region and the Brussels-Capital region.

=== Policy and regulation ===
The governments of the regions are responsible policy and regulation related to water supply and sanitation, and for environmental policy more generally. Within the regional governments, the leading role is assured by the regional administrations of the environment: The Flemish Ministry Energy, the Environment and Nature with its environmental agency in Flanders, the Direction générale des Ressources naturelles et de l'Environnement (DGRNE) in Wallonia and the Institut Bruxellois pour la Gestion de l'Environnement (IBGE) in Brussels. The Federal Government has only a very limited role in water supply and sanitation.

=== Service provision ===
The 589 municipalities of Belgium (308 in the Flemish region with 6.2 million inhabitants, 262 in Wallonia with 3.4 million inhabitants and 19 in Brussels with 1.1 million inhabitants) are responsible for providing drinking water and sanitation services. However, most municipalities have delegated this task to regional or inter-municipal water or sanitation companies. In total, according to one source there were 72 water supply companies in Belgium in 2005. However, another source indicates that there were more than about 62 water supply companies, including 2 regional companies, 30 inter-municipal utilities and 30 municipal utilities. Another 100 mostly small municipalities provide services directly without having a legally of financially separate entity for water supply.

==== Flanders ====
De Watergroep (formerly Vlaamse Maatschappij voor Watervoorziening, VMW) is the regional water company in Flanders providing water and sewer services to 2.6 million clients in 170 municipalities. Water-link (formerly Antwerp Water Works, Antwerpse Waterwerken, AWW) is the provider of drinking water to 7 municipalities in the Antwerp region - Antwerp, Mortsel, Boechout, Edegem, Kontich, Hove, Zwijndrecht and Kapellen - and FARYS (formerly TMVW) is the service provider in 67 municipalities in the Gent region. Aquafin is a regional wastewater treatment company in Flanders. It was established in 1990 by the Flemish government, which is also its major shareholder. Its mission is to design, finance, build and operate all supramunicipal infrastructure needed to treat domestic wastewater and to optimise all main sewer and sewage treatment plants which Aquafin took over from the Flemish Environmental Agency. The private British water company Severn Trent held a 20% minority share in Aquafin until it was sold to the Flemish government in 2006.

==== Wallonia ====
The Société wallonne des eaux (called SWDE after its former name Société Wallonne des Distributions d'Eau) is the most important water service provider in Wallonia with about 960,000 connections and 2.4 million clients in 200 municipalities, providing water to about 70% of the population of Wallonia. SWDE does not provide sanitation services.

Besides SWDE there are seven intermunicipal water utilities in Wallonia:

- AIEC - Association Intercommunale des Eaux du Condroz
- AIEM - Association Intercommunale des Eaux de la Molignée
- CIESAC - Compagnie Intercommunale des Eaux Source les Avins - Groupe Clavier
- CILE - Compagnie Intercommunale Liégeoise des Eaux in Liège
- IDEN - Intercommunale de Distribution d'eau de Nandrin-Tinlot et environs
- IECBW - Intercommunale des Eaux du Centre du Brabant Wallon
- INASEP - Intercommunale Namuroise de Services Publics

The towns of Chimay, Burg-Reuland, Trois-Ponts and St-Vith have their own municipal utilities.

There are also six intermunicipal sanitation utilities:

- AIDE - Association Intercommunale pour le Démergement et l'Epuration des communes de la Province de Liège
- AIVE - Association Intercommunale pour la Valorisation de l'eau pour la Province de Luxembourg
- IBW - Intercommunale du Brabant Wallon
- IGRETEC - Intercommunale pour la Gestion et la Réalisation d'Etudes Techniques et Economiques
- INASEP - Intercommunale Namuroise de Services Publics
- IPALLE - Intercommunale de Propreté Publique du Hainaut Occidental

There is also one intermunicipal water and sanitation utility: IDEA - Intercommunale de Développement Economique et d'Aménagement de la Région Mons-Borinage-Centre.

The seats in the boards of directors of the intercommunales are distributed according to political majorities in the communes. "Most intercommunales are controlled by coalitions between the (Walloon) Socialist Party and the (Walloon) Christian Democrats Party."

==== Brussels region ====
The Intercommunale bruxelloise de distribution d'eau (IBDE) is in charge of water distribution and billing for 19 municipalities in the Brussels region. Previously the Intercommunale Bruxelloise d'Assainissement (IBRA) had been in charge of stormwater drainage and sanitary sewers in the Brusels region, which had only been created in 2000 to replace four Intercommunales for Sanitation. The former Compagnie Intercommunale Bruxelloise des Eaux (CIBE), renamed Vivaqua in 2006, sells bulk water to the city of Brussels. It also operates its sewer network and the Brussels-South wastewater treatment plant on behalf of IBDE. Vivaqua also provides services to other municipalities and intermunicipal associations in both Flanders and Wallonia with a total of 309,000 connections and 2.1 million direct and indirect clients.

=== Associations ===
BELGAQUA is the Belgian federation for the water and sanitation sector representing its member utilities. It regroups three regional trade associations:

- AQUABRU for the Region of Brussels-Capital
- AQUAWAL for Wallonia
- AQUA FLANDERS for the Flemish Region.

Aquawal is the trade association of public water and sanitation service providers in Wallonia.

== Financial aspects ==
=== Tariffs ===
Water tariffs throughout Belgium are increasing-block tariffs with higher unit prices for higher consumption. The number and size of blocks as well as tariff levels for each block vary between regions and service providers. Although PIDPA (in the Flemisch Region, the Antwerp Campine (de Kempen in Dutch)) has changed this in 2009. The unit price has risen for those who have a low consumption (<250 Cu meter/year), and fallen for higher volumes (+ 250 Cu meter/year). The price is now the same.

Flemish region. Everyone has the right to a minimal supply of 15 cubic meters (41 liter/capita/day) of free water per person per year. Concerning sanitation, those living under the Minimum Subsistence Level are exempt from the sanitation tax.

Walloon region. For water, there is an increasing-block tariff with four blocks of consumption. The first block is up to 30 cubic meter per household per year (82 liter/household/day).

Brussels region. The increasing-block tariff has also four blocks, the highest beginning at 60 cubic meter per person per year. The first cubic meter costs 3.8 times less than the highest one. A Social Fund for Water has also been set up, financed by a tax of 0.01 Euro/cubic meter.

=== Financing ===
Walloon region. The Walloon region has established a public company dedicated to the financing and operation of sanitation infrastructure and watershed protection. The Société Publique de Gestion de l'Eau (SPGE), created in 1999, operates under five-year performance contracts with the government. Tariffs are being monitored by an independent entity (Comité de Contrôle) and results are independently monitored by a Collège d'Evaluation. Its two core functions are carried out in two different ways:

- For the financing of sanitation infrastructure, it signs a contract with utilities that obliges them to carry out the investment and operate the infrastructure. SPGE perceives sewer tariff revenues to recoup its investment and to finance the operation of the sanitation infrastructure.
- For watershed protection, it signs a contract with utilities under which they pay SPGE for its services.

SPGE finances its investments from its capital, through long-term loans from the European Investment Bank (EIB) and other sources, as well as through short-term borrowing.

More than 80% of SPGE is owned by public entities - almost 40% by the Walloon regional government, 24% by Aquawal and 20% by SWE - and less than 20% is owned by private companies, including about 10% by Dexia and 5% by Auxipar.

Flanders region. In Flanders, the public company Aquafin is a major financier of sanitation and also benefits from long-term lending provided by the EIB.
