= List of governments in Belgium =

Map indicating the language areas and provinces of Belgium. Provinces are marked by the thinner black lines.: Dutch-speaking / French-speaking; German-speaking / Bilingual French/Dutch; Community: / Region: Flemish / Flanders; French and Flemish / Brussels; French / Wallonia; German-speaking / Wallonia

This is a list of the Belgian federal, regional, and community governments.

== Federal government ==
The federal government of Belgium is the executive branch of Belgium.

Portfolio	Minister		Took Office	Left Office	Party
Portfolio	Image	Name	Took Office	Left Office	Party
Prime Minister
Prime minister of Belgium		Bart De Wever	3 February 2025	Incumbent	N-VA
Deputy Prime Ministers
Deputy Prime Minister & Minister of Finance, Pensions, National Lottery and Federal Culture Institutions		Jan Jambon	3 February 2025	Incumbent	N-VA
Deputy Prime Minister & Minister of Labour, Economy and Agriculture		David Clarinval	3 February 2025	Incumbent	MR
Deputy Prime Minister & Minister of Foreign Affairs, European Affairs and Development Cooperation		Maxime Prévot	3 February 2025	Incumbent	LE
Deputy Prime Minister & Minister of Health and Social Affairs		Frank Vandenbroucke	1 October 2020	Incumbent	Vooruit
Deputy Prime Minister & Minister of Budget and Administrative Simplification		Vincent Van Peteghem	3 February 2025	Incumbent	CD&V
Ministers
Minister of Defence and Foreign Trade		Theo Francken	3 February 2025	Incumbent	N-VA
Minister of Asylum, Migration, Integration and Urban policy		Anneleen Van Bossuyt	3 February 2025	Incumbent	N-VA
Minister of the Interior and in charge of Beliris		Bernard Quintin	3 February 2025	Incumbent	MR
Minister of the Middle Class, Self-Employed and SMEs		Eléonore Simonet	3 February 2025	Incumbent	MR
Minister of Energy		Mathieu Bihet	3 February 2025	Incumbent	MR
Minister of Mobility, Climate and Ecological Transition		Jean-Luc Crucke	3 February 2025	Incumbent	LE
Minister of Public Modernisation, Civil Service, Public Enterprises, Digitisation and Buildings Administration		Vanessa Matz	3 February 2025	Incumbent	LE
Minister of Consumer Affairs, Social Fraud, and Equal Opportunities		Rob Beenders	3 February 2025	Incumbent	Vooruit
Minister of Justice and the North Sea		Annelies Verlinden	3 February 2025	Incumbent	CD&V

== Flemish government ==
The Flemish Government is the executive branch of both the Flemish Region and the Flemish Community.

The coalition replaced the Jambon Government following the 2024 Belgian federal election and again consisted of three parties, together having a narrow majority of 65 seats out of 124 seats total. The N-VA (31 seats) and CD&V (16 seats) were already part of the outgoing coalition, with Vooruit (18 seats) now replacing the Open Vld.

Flemish Government - Diependaele 2024-current
Party	Name	Function
N-VA	Matthias Diependaele	Minister-President of the Flemish Government and Flemish Minister for Economy, Innovation en Industry, External Affairs, Digitalisation, and Facility Management
N-VA	Ben Weyts	Vice minister-president of the Flemish Government and Flemish Minister for Budget and Finance, Vlaamse Rand, Real Estate Heritage, and Animal Welfare
Vooruit	Melissa Depraetere	Vice minister-president of the Flemish Government and Flemish Minister for Housing, Energy and Climate, Tourism, and Youth
CD&V	Hilde Crevits	Vice minister-president of the Flemish Government and Flemish Minister of the Interior, Urban and Rural Policy, Society, Integration and Inclusion, Administration, Social Economy, and Marine Fishing
N-VA	Zuhal Demir	Flemish Minister for Education, Justice, and Employment
N-VA	Annick De Ridder	Flemish Minister for Mobility, Public Works, Ports, and Sport
N-VA	Cieltje Van Achter	Flemish Minister for Brussels, and Media
Vooruit	Caroline Gennez	Flemish minister for Welfare and Poverty Alleviation, Culture, and Equal Opportunities
CD&V	Jo Brouns	Flemish Minister for Agriculture and Environment

== Government of the French Community ==
The Government of the French Community is the executive branch of the French Community.

Government of the French Community – Degryse
Party	Name	Function
LR	Élisabeth Degryse	Minister President and Minister of Budget, Higher Education, School Buildings, Culture, Continuous Education, International Relations, and Francophony
MR	Valérie Glatigny	Vice-Minister President and Minister of Mandatory Education
LR	Valérie Lescrenier	Minister of Early Childhood and Youth Care
LR	Yves Coppieters	Minister of Health, Equal Opportunities, and Women's Rights
MR	Jacqueline Galant	Minister of Sports, Media, and Education in Wallonia & Brussels
MR	Adrien Dolimont	Minister of Scientific Research

== Government of the German-speaking Community ==
The Government of the German-speaking Community is the executive branch of the German-speaking Community.

Following the 9 June 2024 election, ProDG (8 seats) and PFF (3 seats) now formed a coalition with the CSP (5 seats) instead of the PS, which moved to the opposition for the first time since 1990.

Government of the German-speaking Community - Paasch III
Party	Name	Function
ProDG	Oliver Paasch	Minister-President; Minister of Finance and Urban Development
CSP	Jérôme Franssen	Minister of Education and Employment
PFF	Gregor Freches	Minister of Culture, Sport, Youth and Tourism
ProDG	Lydia Klinkenberg	Minister of Social Affairs

== Walloon Government ==
The Walloon Government is the executive branch of Wallonia.

Walloon Government - Dolimont
Function	Name	Party
Minister-president; Minister of Budget, Finance, Animal Welfare, International Affairs, and Firearms Licenses	Adrien Dolimont	MR
Vice-President; Minister of Urban Planning, Public Works, Traffic Safety; and Local Affairs	François Desquesnes	LE
Vice-President; Minister of Economy and Employment	Pierre-Yves Jeholet	MR
Minister of Agriculture and Rural Affairs	Anne-Catherine Dalcq	MR
Minister of Energy, Air-Climate Plan, Housing and Airports	Cécile Neven	MR
Minister of Sports, Infrastructure, and Media	Jacqueline Galant	MR
Minister of Tourism, Heritage, Infrastructure, and Childcare	Valérie Lescrenier	LE
Minister of Health, Environment, Social Economy, Social Action, Fight against Poverty, Handicapped, and Families	Yves Coppieters	LE

== Government of the Brussels-Capital Region ==
The Government of the Brussels-Capital Region is the executive branch of the Brussels-Capital Region.

Following the 7 June 2009 election, the French-speaking parties PS, Ecolo and CDH formed a coalition with the Dutch-speaking parties Open VLD, Sp.A, CD&V and Groen!. The government was originally led by Charles Picqué but he retired on 7 May 2013 and was replaced by Rudi Vervoort.

==== Composition 2019- ====
Government of the Brussels-Capital Region - Vervoort III
Party	Name	Function
PS	Rudi Vervoort	Minister-President; Minister of Urban Renewal, Spatial Development, Safety & Prevention, Tourism, the image of Brussels and bicultural issues of regional importance, Student Affairs and Paying Passenger Transport
Groen	Elke Van den Brandt	Minister of Mobility, Public Works and Road Safety
Ecolo	Alain Maron	Minister of Environment & Climate, Social Integration, Health, Energy, Water, Cleanliness and the Port of Brussels
Open Vld	Sven Gatz	Minister of Finance, Budget, Civil Service, Promotion of Multilingualism, Tourism, Statistics, Urbanism, Heritage, the image of Brussels and bicultural issues of regional importance
DéFI	Bernard Clerfayt	Minister of Employment, Professional Education, Local Authorities, Digitization, Animal Welfare and Child Benefits
PS	Nawal Ben Hamou	Secretary of State for Equal Opportunities and Housing
one.brussels-sp.a	Pascal Smet	Secretary of State for Urbanism, European and International Affairs, Foreign Trade, Fire Fighting and Emergency Medical Assistance
Ecolo	Barbara Trachte	Secretary of State for Economic Transition and Research

== See also ==
- List of national governments
- Politics of Belgium
