= Politics of Wallonia =

The politics of Wallonia concern the government of Wallonia, that is the southern Region of Belgium.

The capital is Namur, where are the seats of the Government of Wallonia, the Parliament of Wallonia and the Public Service of Wallonia.

== Political landscape ==
Wallonia is considered to be left-wing politically, in contrast to Flanders, which is more right-wing. The region has been described as one of the few places in Europe without a significant right-wing populism presence. In Wallonia, there is a cordon sanitaire in the media, where far-right politicians are banned from interviews and live appearances. The ban has also affected more mainstream right-wing parties such as the N-VA.

== Structures ==
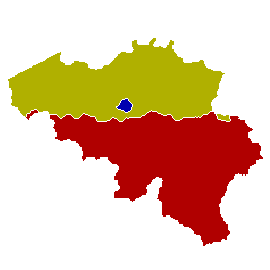
Regions of Belgium Brussels-Capital (blue) Wallonia (red) Flemish Region(yellow)

Since 23 April 1993, Belgium has been a federal state, divided into three geographical regions and three linguistic communities. The Walloon Region is one of the three regions, almost totally French-speaking. The other two geographical regions are the Flemish Region, a mainly Dutch-speaking region in the north and west, and the Brussels-Capital, bilingual French-Dutch administering the city of Brussels. Some governmental competencies are exercised by the linguistic communities, of which the French community of Belgium is the largest in Wallonia, while the German-speaking community of Belgium's responsibilities are for an area within Wallonia.

The Parliament of Wallonia is a unicameral legislature of 75 members elected to serve five-year terms. It is based in the former Hospice Saint-Gilles at Namur.

The Government of Wallonia is responsible to the Parliament. Excepting cultural and education matters, which are controlled by the linguistic communities, the Walloon Region's competences include local administration, housing, transport, training, employment, health and social policy. The region administers a number of companies, including those responsible for the provision of water and public transport.

The constitutional system of Belgium grants the Walloon Region its own legislative and executive powers in the fields for which it is competent:

- agriculture and rural renewal
- development of the territory and town planning
- economy and foreign trade
- employment and vocational training
- the environment, water and nature conservation
- housing
- local authorities, subsidized works and sports infrastructures
- scientific research, new technologies and energy
- international relations
- health and social affairs
- tourism and heritage
- regional transport, mobility and public works.

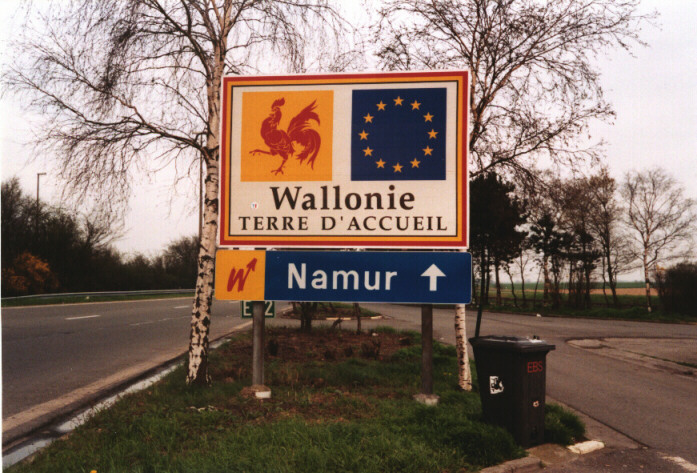
Motorways are attributed to Walloon Region in its territory.

== Parliament ==
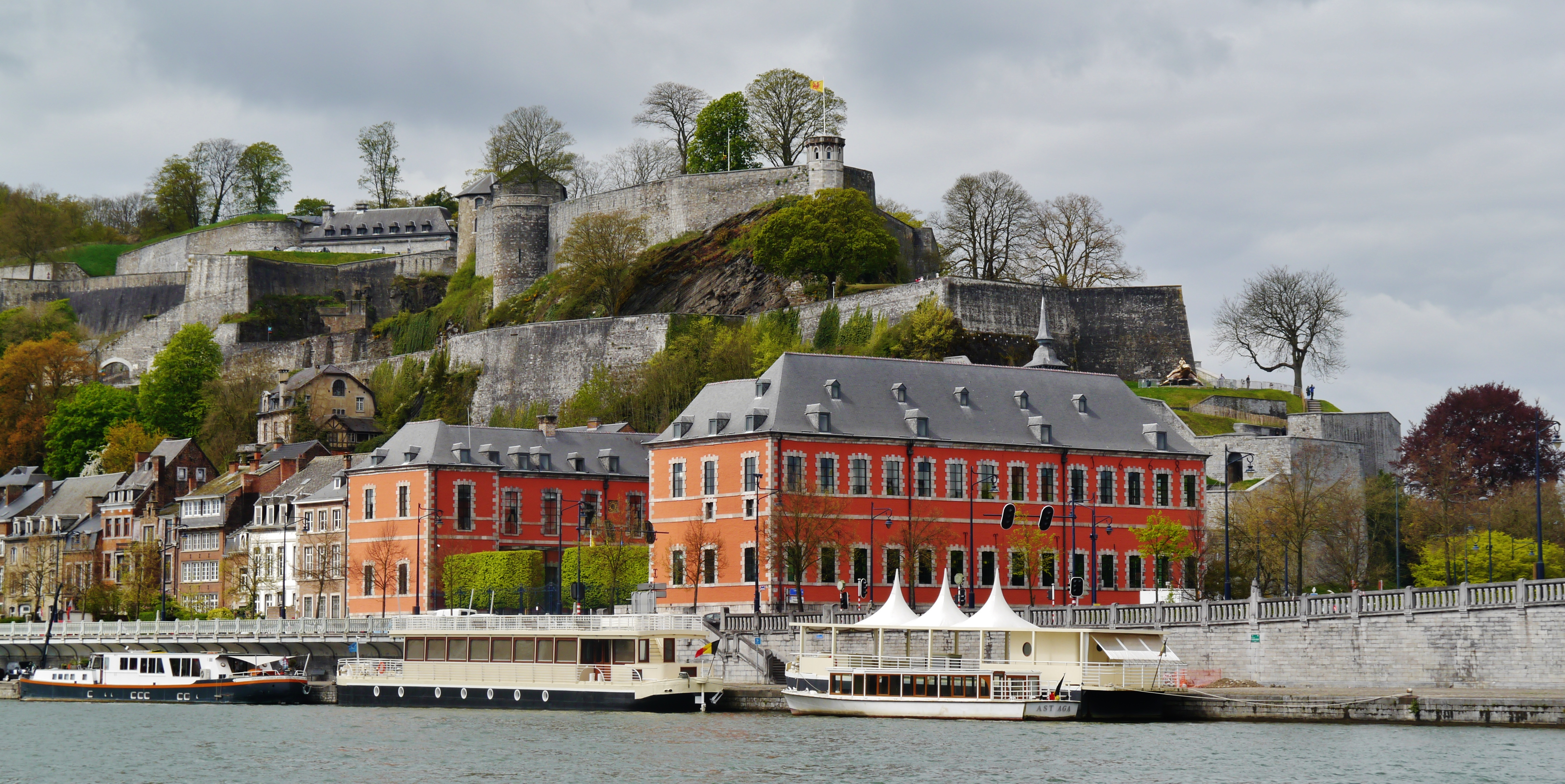
Namur : the Citadel and the Parliament of Wallonia.

The directly elected Walloon Parliament was created in June 1995, replacing the Conseil régional wallon (Regional Council of Wallonia). This first sat on 15 October 1980 and was composed of members of the Belgian Chamber of People's Representatives and the Belgian Senate elected from Wallonia.

The parliament exercises several functions:

- It discusses and passes decrees, and they can take initiatives to draw them up. After this, decrees are sanctioned and promulgated by the Walloon Government.
- It controls the Walloon Government. Control is exercised via the vote.
- It ratifies the international treaties linked to its powers.

The composition of the parliament for the 2004-2009 legislature was as follows:

- Parti Socialiste (PS) : 34
- Mouvement réformateur (MR) : 20
- Centre démocrate humaniste (CDH) : 14
- Front national (FN) : 4
- Ecolo : 3

The president of the parliament was José Happart (PS), the Vice-Presidents were Véronique Cornet (MR), Michel Lebrun (CDh) and Charles Janssens (PS).

The composition of the parliament for the 2009-2014 legislature is as follows:

- Parti Socialiste (PS) : 29
- Mouvement réformateur (MR) : 19
- Ecolo : 14
- Centre démocrate humaniste (CDH) : 13

The president of the parliament is Emily Hoyos.

The new coalition government is gathering the PS, the CDH and Ecolo and has the same minister-president.

The 75 members of the parliament (except German-speaking members, who are substituted by French-speaking members from the same party), together with 19 French-speaking members elected by the Parliament of the Brussels-Capital Region, form the Parliament of the French Community. Since 1999 elections have been held together with those for the European Parliament.

== Government ==
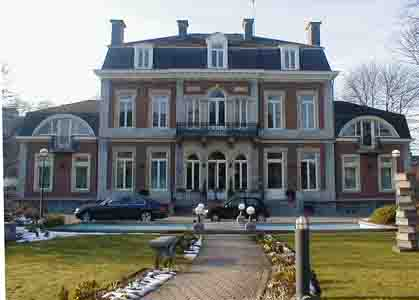
L'Élysette: seat of the Government of Wallonia, in Namur

The Government of Wallonia is the executive body of the Walloon Region.

Walloon Government - Dolimont
Function	Name	Party
Minister-president; Minister of Budget, Finance, Animal Welfare, International Affairs, and Firearms Licenses	Adrien Dolimont	MR
Vice-President; Minister of Urban Planning, Public Works, Traffic Safety; and Local Affairs	François Desquesnes	LE
Vice-President; Minister of Economy and Employment	Pierre-Yves Jeholet	MR
Minister of Agriculture and Rural Affairs	Anne-Catherine Dalcq	MR
Minister of Energy, Air-Climate Plan, Housing and Airports	Cécile Neven	MR
Minister of Sports, Infrastructure, and Media	Jacqueline Galant	MR
Minister of Tourism, Heritage, Infrastructure, and Childcare	Valérie Lescrenier	LE
Minister of Health, Environment, Social Economy, Social Action, Fight against Poverty, Handicapped, and Families	Yves Coppieters	LE

The Government of the French Community and the Government of the German-speaking Community are the executive bodies of respectively the French and German-speaking Communities.

== See also ==
- Science and technology in Wallonia
- Politics of Belgium, Politics of Flanders, Politics of Brussels
