= Politics of Belgium =

Politics of Belgium Politiek in België (Dutch) Politique en Belgique (French) Politisches System Belgiens (German)
- Coat of arms of Belgium
- Polity type: Federal parliamentary constitutional monarchy
- Constitution: Constitution of Belgium

Legislative branch
- Name: Federal Parliament
- Type: Bicameral
- Meeting place: Palace of the Nation
- Upper house
- Name: Senate
- Presiding officer: Stephanie D'Hose, President of the Senate
- Lower house
- Name: Chamber of Representatives
- Presiding officer: Eliane Tillieux, President of the Chamber of Representatives

Executive branch
- Head of state
- Title: Monarch
- Currently: Philippe
- Appointer: Hereditary
- Head of government
- Title: Prime Minister
- Currently: Bart De Wever
- Appointer: Monarch
- Cabinet
- Name: Council of Ministers
- Current cabinet: De Wever Government
- Leader: Prime Minister
- Deputy leader: Deputy Prime Minister
- Appointer: Monarch

Judicial branch
- Name: Judiciary of Belgium
- Court of Cassation
- Chief judge: Jean de Codt
- Constitutional Court
- Chief judge: François Daout; André Alen
- Council of State
- Chief judge: Wilfried Van Vaerenbergh

The politics of Belgium take place in the framework of a federal, representative democratic, constitutional monarchy. The King of the Belgians is the head of state, and the prime minister of Belgium is the head of government, in a multi-party system. Executive power is exercised by the government. Federal legislative power is vested in both the government and the two chambers of parliament, the Senate and the Chamber of Representatives. The federation is made up of (language-based) communities and (territorial) regions. Philippe is the seventh and current King of the Belgians, having ascended the throne on 21 July 2013.

Since around 1970, the significant Belgian national political parties have split into distinct representations for each communities' interests, besides defense of their ideologies. These parties belong to three main political families, though all close to the centre: the right-wing Liberals, the social conservative Christian Democrats and the Socialists forming the left-wing. Other important newer parties are the Green parties and, nowadays mainly in Flanders, the nationalist and far-right parties. Politics is influenced by lobby groups, such as trade unions and employers' organizations such as the Federation of Belgian Enterprises. Majority rule is often superseded by a de facto confederal decision-making process where the minority (the French-speakers) enjoy important protections through specialty majorities (2/3 overall and majority in each of the 2 main communities). According to the V-Dem Democracy indices, Belgium was, in 2024, the 5th most electoral democratic country in the world.

== Constitution ==
The Constitution of Belgium, the primary source of law and the basis of the political system of the Country, was established on February 7, 1831. It has been changed several times, but the most relevant reforms were made in 1970 and in 1993.

In 1970, in response to a growing civil conflict between the Dutch-speaking and French-speaking communities in Brussels, the Government declared that "the unitary state, its structure and functioning as laid down by law, had become obsolete". The new constitution recognised the existence of strong communitarian and regional differences within Belgium, but sought to reconcile these differences through a diffusion of power to the communities and the regions.

In 1993, the parliament approved a constitutional package transforming Belgium into a full-fledged federal state.

== Government ==
=== Executive ===
Main office-holders
Office	Name	Party	Since
King	Philippe	—N/a	21 July 2013
Prime Minister	Bart De Wever	N-VA	3 February 2025

==== Head of state ====
The King of the Belgians is the constitutional head of the Belgian state and holds office for life. The duties of the king are laid out by the Belgian Constitution and other laws enforced under it.

As titular head of state, the king plays a ceremonial and symbolic role in the nation. His main political function is to designate a political leader to form a new cabinet after an election or the resignation of a cabinet. In conditions where there is a "constructive vote of no-confidence," the government has to resign and the lower house of Parliament proposes a new prime minister to the king. The king is also seen as playing a symbolic unifying role, representing a common national Belgian identity.

Philippe succeeded his father Albert II on 21 July 2013 upon his abdication.

==== Federal government ====
The executive power is held by the prime minister and the ministers, who together form the Council of Ministers, and by the secretaries of state, each of whom is deputy to a minister and is part of the federal Government, but does not sit in the Council of Ministers.

Members of the Federal Government, who are formally appointed by the King, are in fact drawn from the political parties which form the government coalition.

The Federal Government must enjoy the confidence of the Chamber of Representatives.

The total number of ministers, excluding the prime minister, cannot exceed 15. Also, the number of Dutch- and French-speaking ministers must be equal, with the possible exception of the prime minister.

Ministers head executive departments of the government. The prime minister and his ministers administer the government and the various public services and the ministers must defend their policies and performance in person before the Chamber.

==== Regional and community governments ====
The regional and community parliaments and governments have jurisdiction over transportation, public works, water policy, cultural matters, education, public health, environment, housing, zoning, and economic and industrial policy. They rely on a system of revenue-sharing for funds. They have the authority to levy a very few taxes (mostly surcharges) and to contract loans. Moreover, they have obtained exclusive treaty-making power for those issues coming under their respective jurisdictions. Of total public spending (interest payments not considered), more than 30% is authorized by the regions and communities, although their financing comes for over 80% from national Belgian budgets; at the same time, the national government controls 100% of social security, and strictly limits the taxation policy by the federalized entities. As a result, Belgian institutions still control over 90% of the effective, global taxation levels on individuals and companies.

Though since 1993 article 35 of the Constitution requires the creation of a list specifying federal as opposed to regional and communities' competences, such list was never created. Therefore, the federal government continues to exercise all competences not explicitly dedicated to the lesser levels.

The Flemish parties generally favour much larger community (and regional) autonomy, including financial and tax autonomy, while the francophone parties generally oppose it. The French-speaking parties tend to favour more state control.

As of October 2019, the regional executives are the following:

- Minister-President of Flemish Government (Community+Region): Jan Jambon (N-VA)
- Minister-President of French Community Government: Pierre-Yves Jeholet (MR)
- Minister-President of Wallonia: Elio Di Rupo (PS)
- Minister-President of Brussels-Capital Regional Government: Rudi Vervoort (PS)
- Minister-President of German Community Government: Oliver Paasch (ProDG)

==== Provincial and local government ====
The two biggest regions, Flanders and Wallonia, are further subdivided into five provinces each. The Brussels-Capital Region is directly divided into 19 municipalities. In total, Belgium counts 581 municipalities. Provincial and local government is an exclusive competency of the regions. Therefore, one should see the relevant articles for more detailed information on provincial and local government.

In the Brussels region, there is another form of intermediate government, constituted by institutions from each of the two competent communities. Those institutions (COCOF for the French-speakers and VGC for the Flemings) have similar competencies, although only COCOF has legislative powers, given by the French Community. For Brussels community matters common to both communities there is a Common Community Commission.

=== Legislative ===
Legislative powers in Belgium are divided between the national, the regional and the community levels.

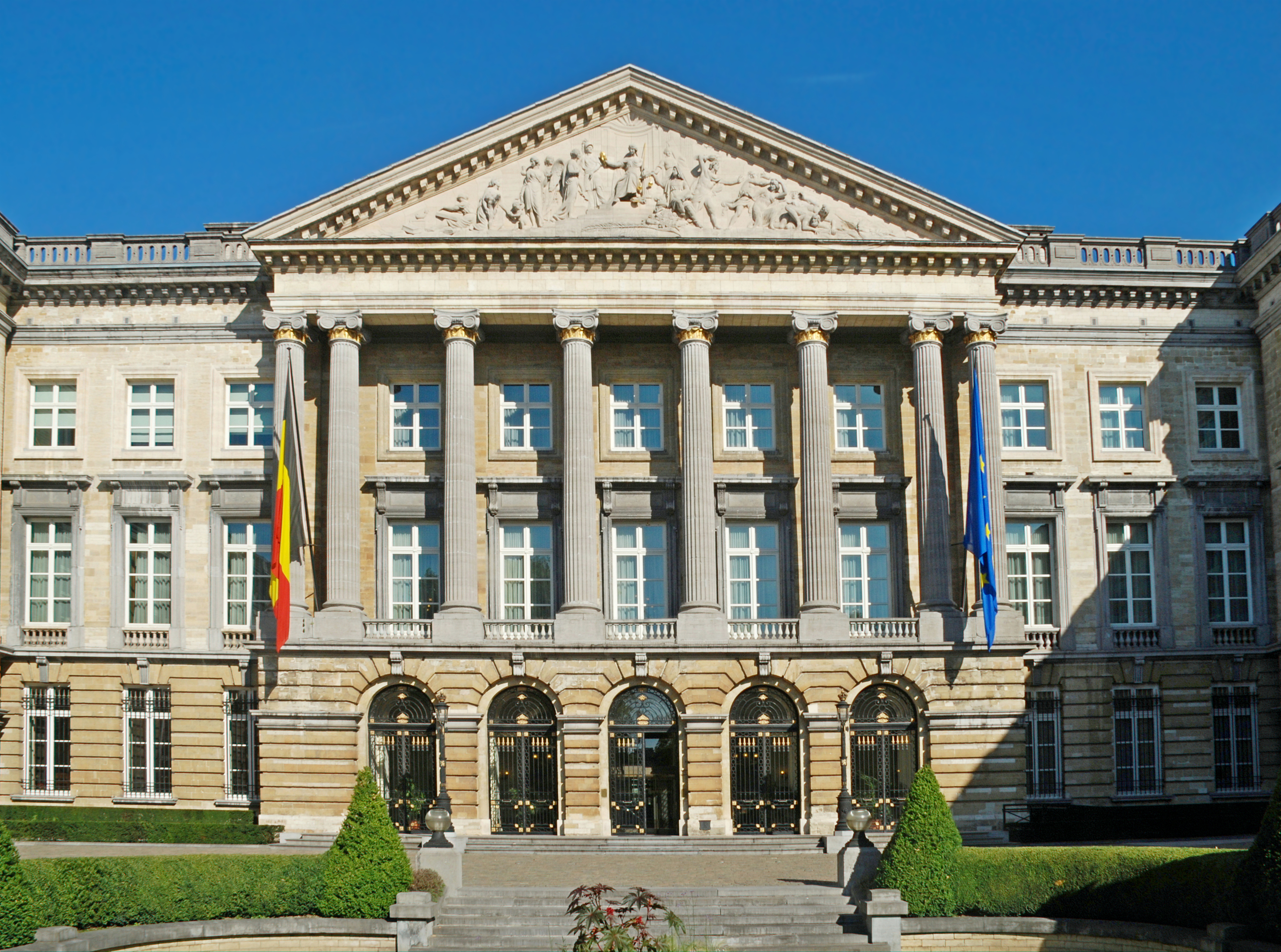
Palace of the Nation, Brussels

The Belgian Federal Parliament consists of the Senate (Dutch: Senaat, French: Sénat) and the Chamber of Representatives (Dutch: Kamer van Volksvertegenwoordigers, French: Chambre des Représentants). The Chamber has 150 members; the Senate has 60. All 150 representatives are elected directly via a system of proportional representation. The Senate consists of 50 senators elected by the parliaments of the communities and regions, and 10 senators co-opted by the others.

Since the Constitutional reforms of 1993 and 2013, the two Houses of Parliament do not sit on a level of parity: other than in cases regarding the constitutional, institutional or federal structure or international relation, the consent of the Senate either is not required (so-called "unicameral laws", voted only by the House, such as the budget) or can be dispensed with by the House. The Chamber of Representatives is also the only house that votes the confidence to the Government.

Each of the five components of the federal system (Flemish Community, French Community, German-speaking Community, Walloon Region and Brussels-Capital Region) have their own, directly elected unicameral council or parliament. They vote decrees (or ordinances in Brussels), that have the same value and are on the same juridical level as the federal laws.

=== Judiciary ===
The judicial system is based on civil law and originates from the Napoleonic Code. It has a judicial review of legislative acts. It accepts compulsory ICJ jurisdiction, with reservations. The Court of Appeals is one level below the Court of Cassation, an institution based on the French Court of Cassation. The Court of Cassation (Dutch: Hof van Cassatie, French: Cour de Cassation) is the most important court in Belgium. Judges are appointed for life by the Belgian monarch.

== Elections and parties ==
=== Electoral system ===
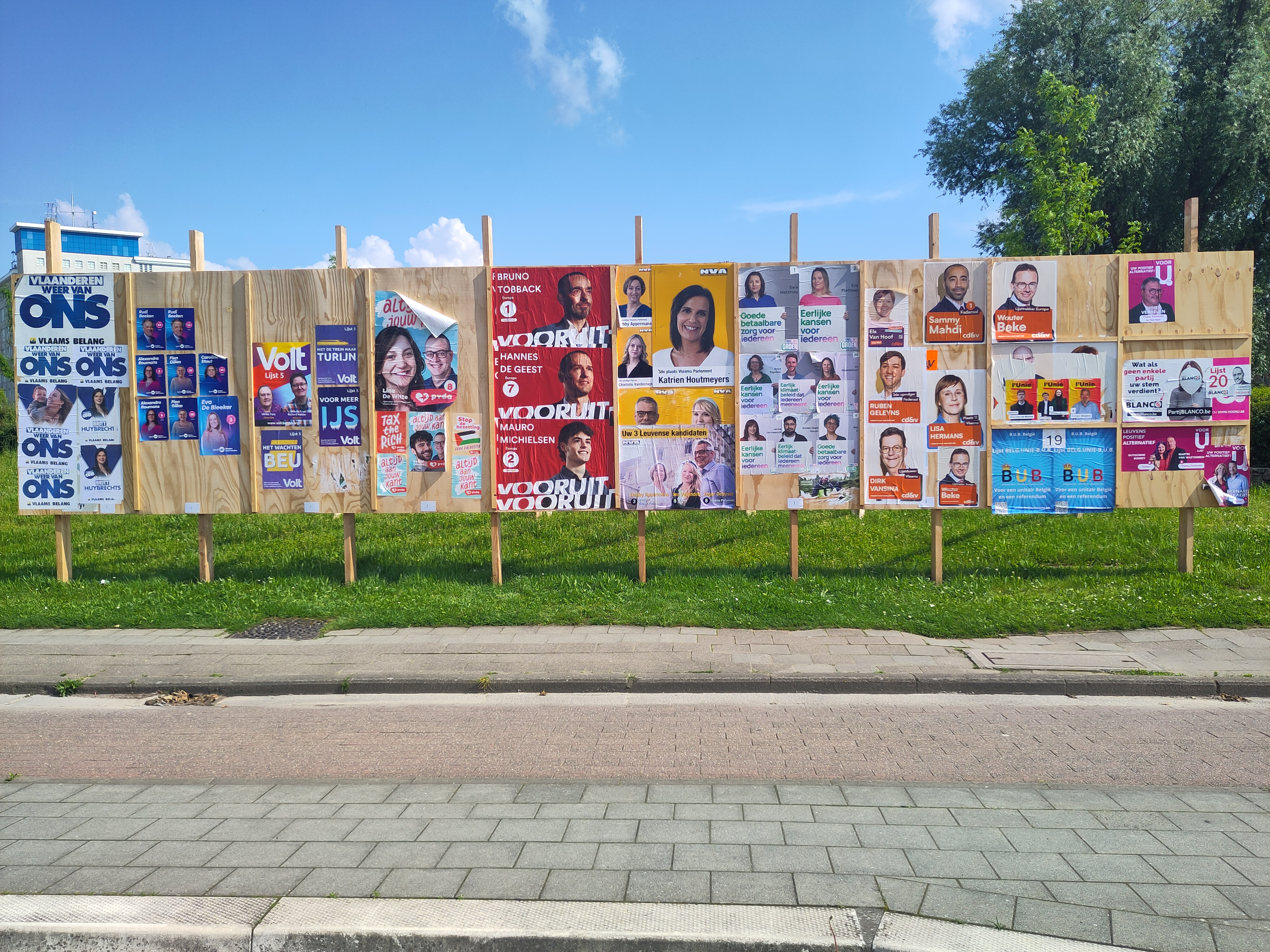
Election billboard in Leuven for the 2024 Belgian elections.

The election for the Belgian Chamber of Representatives is based on a system of open list proportional representation. Several months before an election, each party forms a list of candidates for each district. Parties are allowed to place as many candidates on their lists as there are seats available. The formation of the list is an internal process that varies with each party. The place on the list is considered to play a role in the election of a candidate, by giving stronger visibility to those high on the list; this phenomenon, however, seems to have lost importance since the last electoral reform.

Belgian voters are given five options. They may:

- Vote for a list as a whole, thereby showing approval of the order established by the party;
- Vote for one or more individual candidates, regardless of his/her ranking on the list (a "preference vote");
- Vote for one or more of the "alternates" (substitutes);
- Vote for one or more candidates, and one or more alternates;
- Vote invalid or blank so no one receives the vote.

While there are some options to vote on more than one person, voters cannot vote for candidates of more than one candidate list (party). Doing so makes the vote invalid.

Political campaigns in Belgium are relatively short, lasting only about one month. They are subjected to several limitations:

- There are restrictions on the use of billboards.
- For all of their activities, campaigns included, the political parties have to rely on government subsidies and dues paid by their members.
- An electoral expenditures law restricts expenditures during the campaign.

Belgium used to be one of the few countries that has compulsory voting, thus having one of the highest rates of voter turnout in the world, but this was abolished in 2024.

Elections for the Chamber of Representatives (Federal Parliament) are normally held every five years and coincide with those for the European Parliament. Before 2014, they were held every four years and were held separately. The community and regional parliaments are elected every five years, and their elections coincide with those for the European Parliament as well. Elections for the members of Belgium's municipal and provincial councils are held every six years.

The latest municipal and provincial elections and the latest federal and regional elections were both held in 2024.

=== Political parties ===
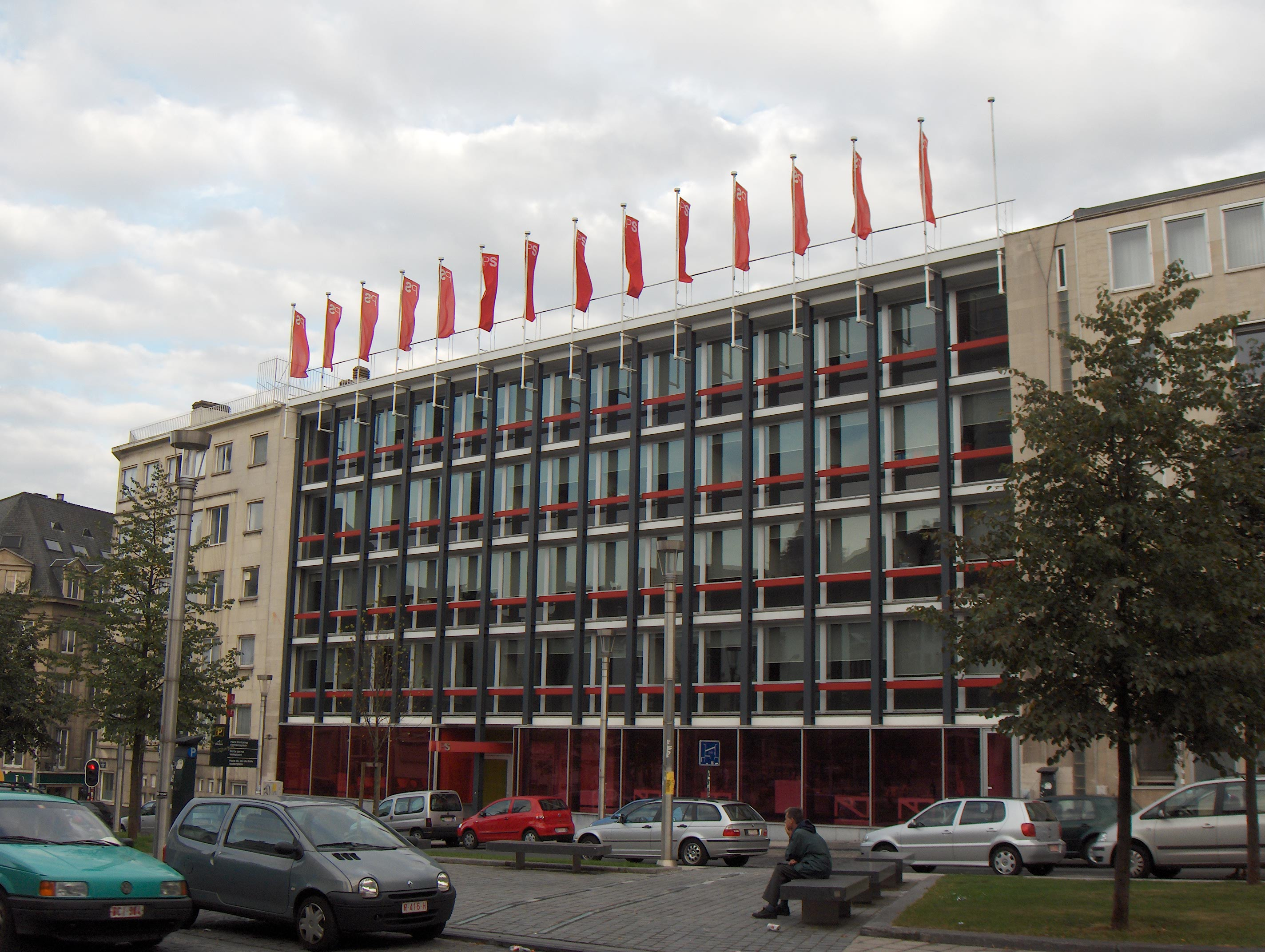
Headquarters of the Parti Socialiste (PS) in Brussels, in 2006.

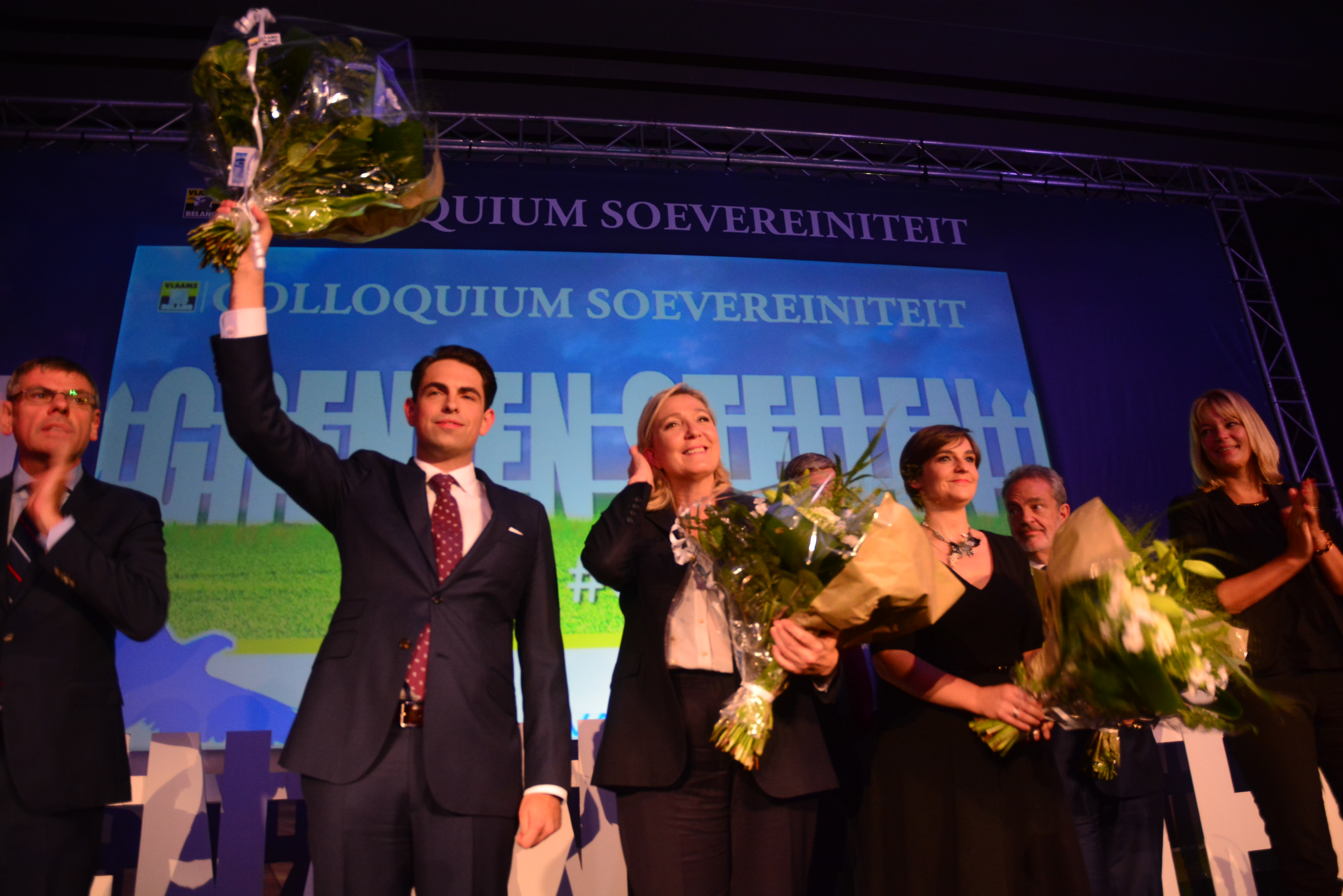
Tom Van Grieken (Vlaams Belang) on stage with French far-right politician Marine Le Pen during a convention in 2015.

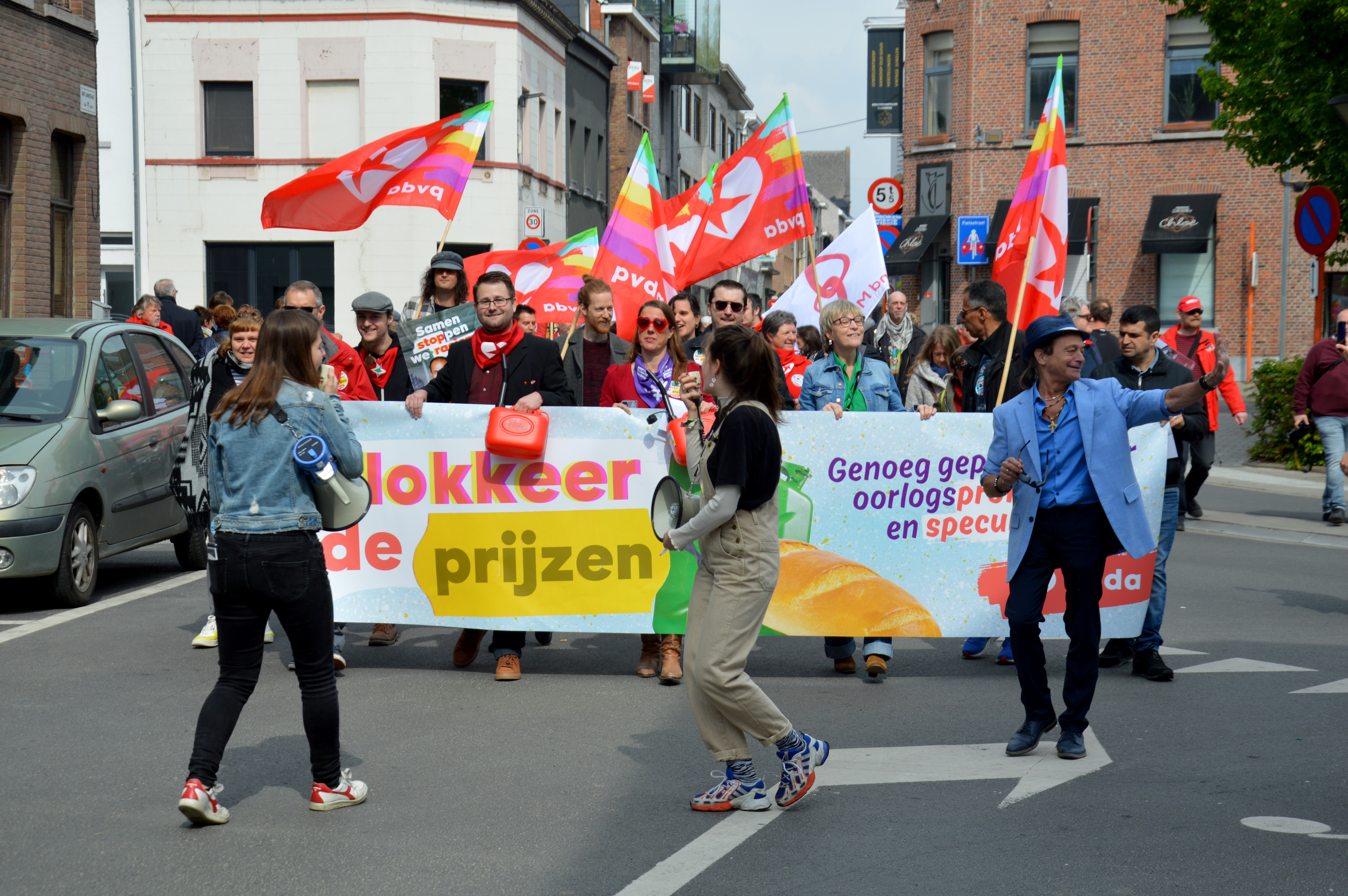
Members of the Workers' Party of Belgium (PVDA/PTB) during a Labour Day march in 2022.

In Belgium, aside from a few minor German-speaking parties, most political parties are either Dutch-speaking (Flemish) or French-speaking; the only major bilingual party operating across all of Belgium is the Workers' Party of Belgium (PVDA/PTB), a far-left party which has been represented in parliament since 2014. Parties run their own think tanks (centres d'études / studiedienst), research outfits that draft policy. When their party is in power, they serve as back offices for ministers' cabinets.

Another important characteristic of Belgian national politics is the highly federal nature of decision making. Important decisions require both a national majority (2/3 for constitutional changes), as well as majorities in the two main language groups. On top of that, both these communities can activate 'alarm bell'-procedures, delaying changes. In addition, there are no national parties to speak of. As a result of this, Belgian decision making can be slow and expensive. On top, it tends to significantly favour the more conservative parties. Given the historically very high public expenditure, and the very strict central control over taxation, even for revenues going to regions and communities, the tendency of Belgian governments to lower taxation and especially labour charges has been limited, at least if compared to radical-liberal approaches followed by certain other countries.

==== History of the political landscape ====
From the creation of the Belgian state in 1830 and throughout most of the 19th century, two political parties dominated Belgian politics: the Catholic Party (Church-oriented and conservative) and the Liberal Party (anti-clerical and progressive). In the late 19th century, the Socialist Party arose to represent the emerging industrial working class. These three groups still dominate Belgian politics, but they have evolved substantially in character.

In the years before and after the Second World War, the linguistic problem became a stronger divisive issue in Belgian politics, with the emergence in the 1950s and 1960s of linguistic parties (Volksunie, FDF and Rassemblement Wallon). In the 1960s and 1970s, each of the main political parties of Belgium split into Flemish and French-speaking parties.

After May 68, the country saw a growing environmental and left wing movement, that led to the foundation of the ecological parties Groen! and Ecolo.

Especially in Flanders, the 1980s saw the growth of the far right, represented by the Vlaams Belang, which became one of the larger parties of the country in the 1990s.

During the years surrounding the new millennium, an attempt at restructuring the political landscape took place, mainly taking the form of political cartels. In 2025 the Eurobarometer opinion poll found government debt, cost of living, immigration, economy and security as the most common political concerns for Belgians.

==== Main political parties ====
Main Flemish parties:

- Christian Democratic and Flemish (CD&V)
- Groen
- New Flemish Alliance (N-VA)
- Open Flemish Liberals and Democrats (Open Vld)
- Forward (Vooruit)
- Vlaams Belang
- Partij van de Arbeid van België (PVDA)

Main French-speaking parties:

- Ecolo
- Democratic, Federalist, Independent (DéFI)
- The Engaged (cdH)
- Socialist Party (PS)
- Reformist Movement (MR)
- Parti du Travail Belgique (PTB)

German-speaking parties:

- Christian Social Party (CSP)
- Party for Freedom and Progress (PFF)
- ProDG
- Vivant

=== Latest electoral results and government formation ===
- 2024 Belgian regional elections
- 2024 Belgian federal election
- 2024 European Parliament election in Belgium
- 2024–2025 Belgian government formation
- 2024 Belgian local elections

== Trade unions ==
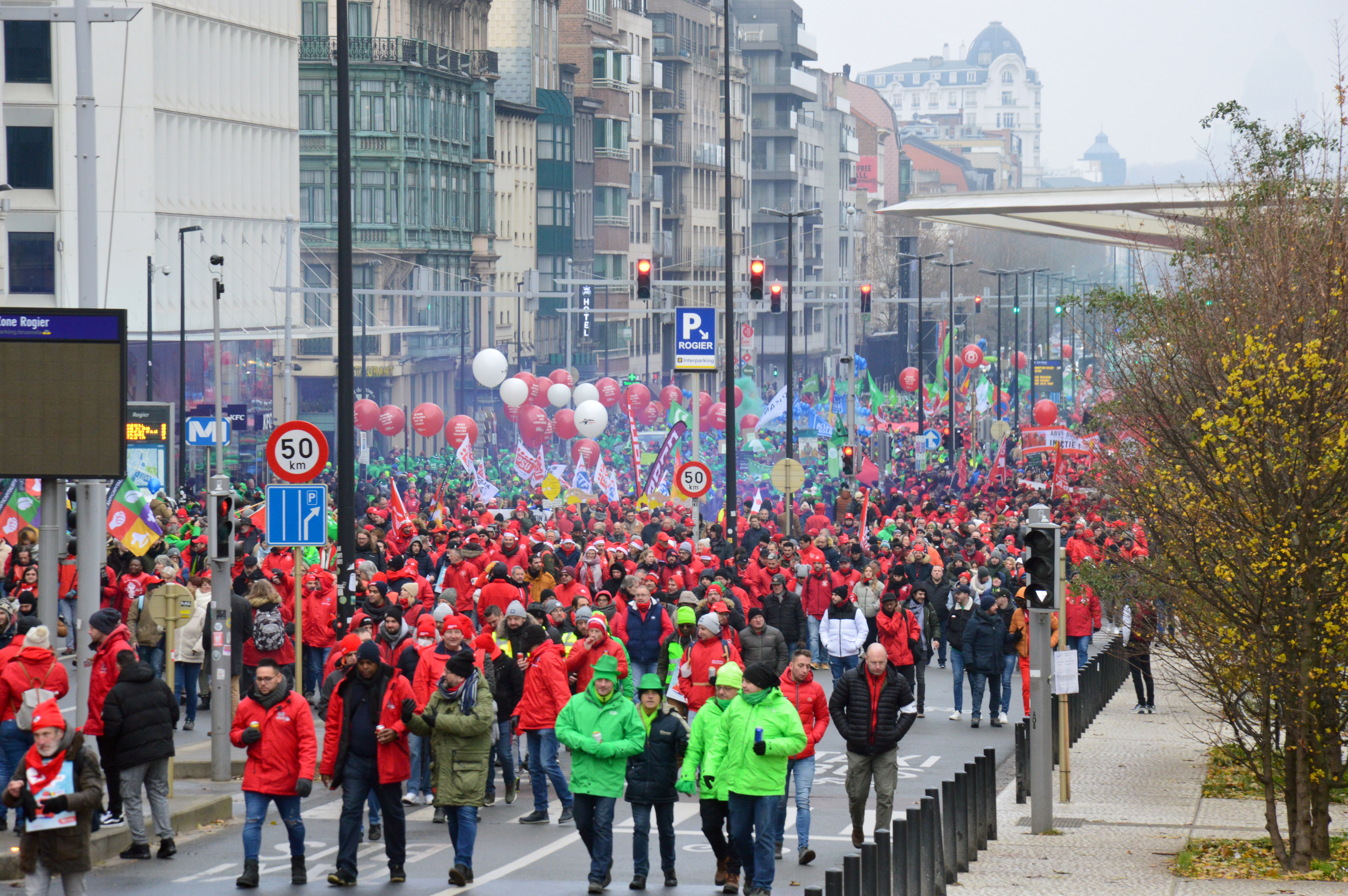
Trade union members protest for higher purchasing power in the streets of Brussels in 2022.

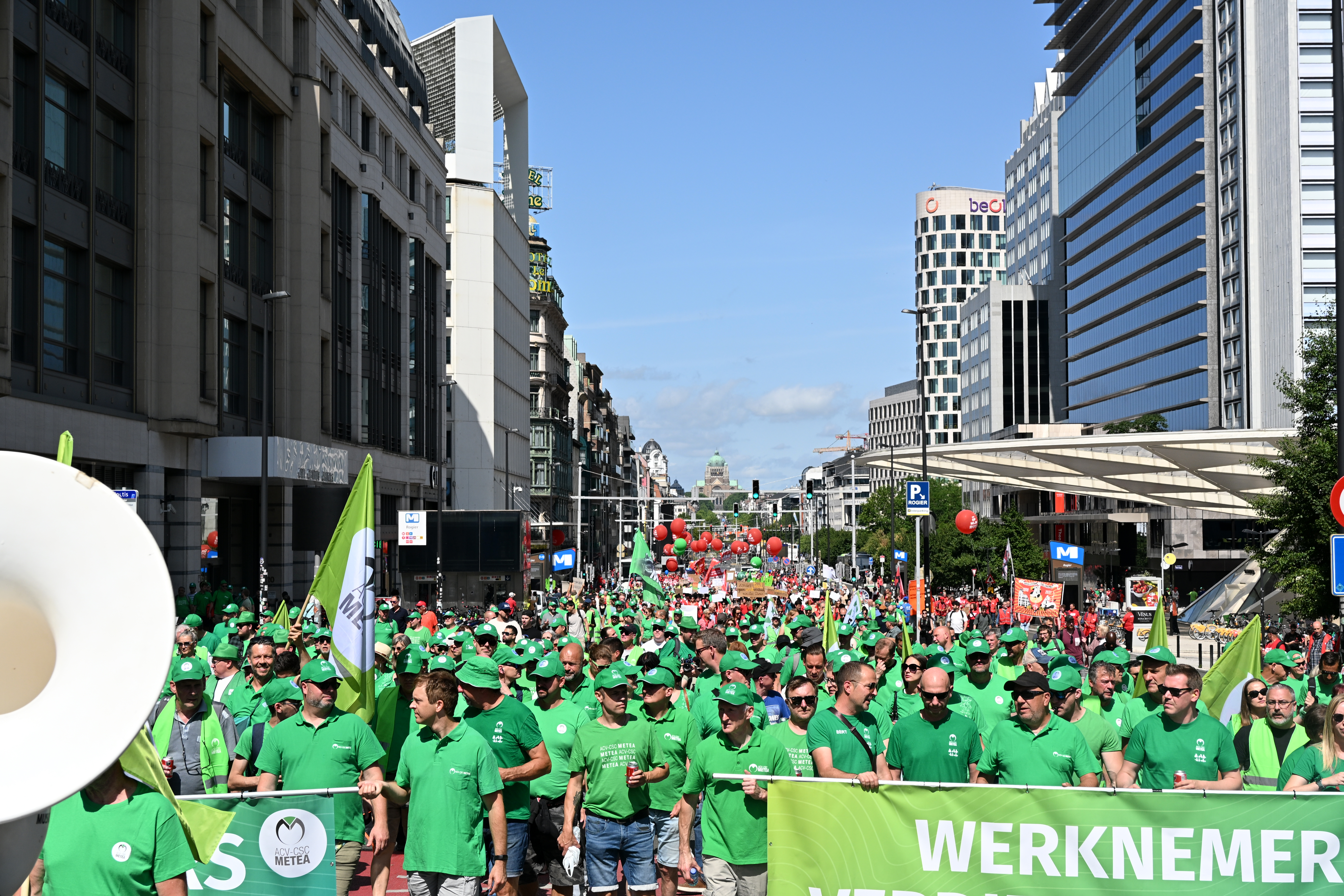
CSC/ACV members during a national demonstration against the policies of the De Wever Government in 2025.

Belgium is a highly unionised country, and organised labour is a powerful influence in politics. About 53% of all private sector and public service employees are labour union members. Not simply a "bread and butter" movement in the American sense, Belgian labour unions take positions on education, public finance, defence spending, environmental protection, women's rights, abortion, and other issues. They also provide a range of services, including the administration of unemployment benefits.

Belgium's three principal trade union organizations are the Confederation of Christian Trade Unions (CSC/ACV) (1,705,000 members), the General Federation of Belgian Labour (FGTB/ABVV) (1,198,000 members) and Synova (previously CGSLB/ACLVB) which has 230,000 members.

Until the fifties, the FGTB/ABVV was the largest confederation, since then, however, the CSC/ACV has become the leading trade union force. In the most recent works council elections held in 2004 the CSC/ACV garnered close to 53% of the vote, the Socialist confederation obtained 36%, and the Liberal confederation 10%.

The Confederation of Catholic labour Unions (CSC/ACV). Organised in 1912, the CSC/ACV rejects the Marxist concept of "class struggle" and seeks to achieve a just social order based on Christian principles. The CSC/ACV is not formally linked to its party political counterparts, the Christian Democratic parties (CD&V and CDH), but exercises great influence in their councils.

The Belgian Socialist Confederation of labour (FGTB/ABVV) derives from the socialist trade union movement, established in the late 19th century in Walloon industrial areas, Brussels, and urban areas of Flanders.

== Linguistic division ==
Belgium is a country in which language is a major political issue. In the 19th and early 20th century, Flemings did not enjoy the same rights as French-speakers, both de facto and de jure. When the country was founded in 1830 under a census voting system, only around 1% of the adult population could vote: nobility, haute-bourgeoisie and higher clerics, all of them French-speaking. A Flemish movement fought peacefully to gain equal rights, obtaining most of these. Minor issues exist also between German- and French-speakers.

In the 3rd century AD, Germanic Franks migrated into what is now Belgium. The less populated northern areas became Germanic, while in the southern part, where the Roman presence had been much stronger, Latin persisted despite the migrations of the Franks. This linguistic frontier has more or less endured.

The Industrial Revolution of the late 18th and the 19th century further accentuated the north–south division. Francophone Wallonia became an early industrial boom area, affluent and politically dominant. Dutch-speaking Flanders remained agricultural and was economically and politically outdistanced by Wallonia and the capital. The elite during the 19th century and the first half of the 20th century spoke French, even in the Dutch-speaking area. In the 20th century, and particularly after the Second World War, Flanders saw an economic flowering while Wallonia became economically stagnant. As Flemings became more educated and more well off, and sought a fair and equal share of political power, tensions between the two communities rose.

Linguistic demonstrations in the early 1960s led in 1962 to the establishment of a formal linguistic border and elaborate rules were made to protect minorities in linguistically mixed border areas. In 1970, the Constitution was amended. Flemish and francophone cultural councils were established with authority in matters relating to language and culture for the two language groups.

The 1970 constitutional revision did not finally settle the problem, however. A controversial amendment declared that Belgium consists of three cultural communities (the Flemish Community, the French(-speaking) Community and the German-speaking Community) and three economic regions (Flanders, Wallonia, and Brussels) each to be granted a significant measure of political autonomy. It was not until 1980, however, that an agreement could be reached on how to implement this new constitutional provision.

In August 1980, the Belgian Parliament passed a devolution bill and amended the Constitution, establishing:

- A Flemish community legislative assembly (council) and Flemish government;
- A Francophone community legislative council and government competent for cultural, language, and educational matters; and
- Walloon and Flemish regional legislative assemblies and governments competent for regional economic matters.

Immediately, the Flemings had their regional legislative council and government transfer its competencies to the community legislative council and government. That became competent for both cultural, language, and educational affairs, and for regional economic matters.

Since 1984 the German language community of Belgium (in the eastern part of Liège Province) has had its own legislative assembly and executive, competent for cultural, language, and educational affairs.

In 1988–89 the Constitution was again amended to give additional responsibilities to the regions and communities. The most sweeping change was to devolve nearly all responsibilities for educational matters to the communities. Moreover, the regions and communities were provided additional revenue, and Brussels Region was given its own legislative assembly and executive.

Another important constitutional reform took place in the summer of 1993. It formally changed Belgium from a unitary to a federal state. It also (modestly) reformed the bicameral parliamentary system and provided for the direct election of the members of the community and regional legislative councils. The bilingual Brabant province was split into separate Flemish Brabant and Walloon Brabant provinces, whereas in the Brussels-Capital Region most of the elsewhere provincial powers are exercised by the region and the responsibilities of an elsewhere provincial governor towards the federal level, by the Governor of Brussels-Capital. However, the electoral and judicial districts of Brussels-Halle-Vilvoorde were not split.

Despite the numerous constitution revisions, the matter is not completely settled. There is still a lot of political tension between French-speakers and Dutch-speakers, and, to a lesser degree, between French-speakers and the politically far weaker German-speakers.

=== Shift from linguistic to cultural and political animosity ===
At the end of the 20th century, it became clear that the main opposition between Flemings and Walloons was not primarily linguistic anymore, but had shifted to major political and demographic differences. Flemish parties appear much more 'Anglo-Saxon' in policy choices, moving away from 'big state' philosophies. French-speaking parties, including their 'right-wing' parties, tend to favor big government and state support for the poor.

This became very obvious after the 2007 elections: in Flanders, the classical left-wing parties only captured 1/4 of the votes. On the French-speaking side, the left still carried 1/2 of the votes. One of the key differences centers on the policy towards everyone receiving allocations. Flemings strongly favor a policy focused at helping them regain their autonomy.

== See also ==
- Belgian order of precedence
- 2014 Belgian government formation
- 2010–11 Belgian government formation
- Belgian official journal
- Corruption in Belgium
- List of governments in Belgium
- Politics of Flanders
- Politics of Wallonia
- Same-sex marriage in Belgium
- Schematic overview of Belgian institutions
- War Crimes Law (Belgium)
