= Government of the French Community =

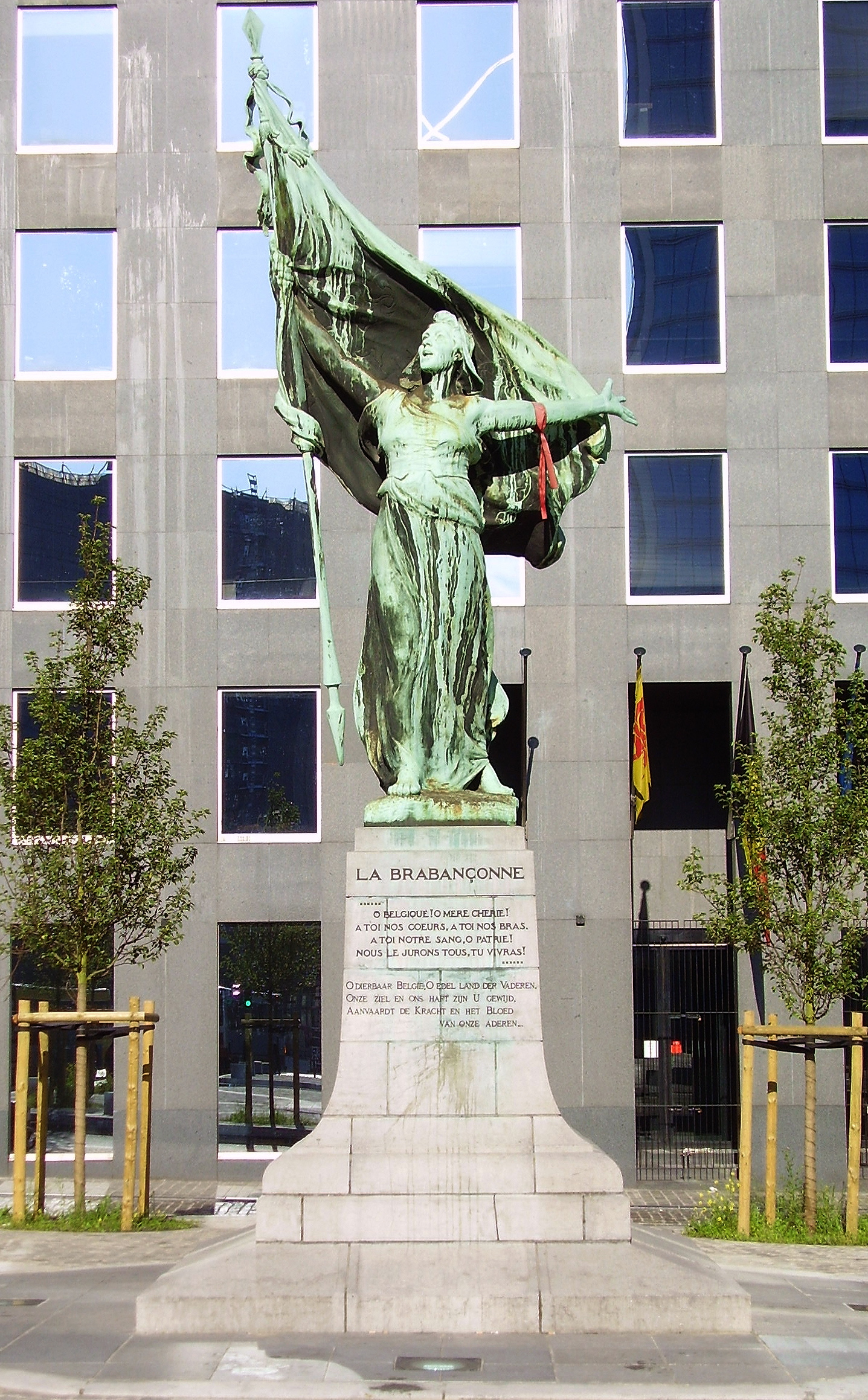
The seat of the Cabinet of the French Community, place Surlet de Chokier

The Cabinet of the French Community of Belgium (French: Gouvernement de la Communauté française, pronounced [ɡuvɛʁnəmɑ̃ d(ə) la kɔmynote fʁɑ̃sɛːz]) is the executive branch of the French Community of Belgium, and it sits in Brussels. It consists of a number of ministers chosen by the Parliament of the French Community and is headed by a Minister-President.

== Compositions ==
=== Current composition ===
Following the 2024 Belgian regional elections, the MR (26 seats) became the largest party and chose to form a government together with the third party LE (17 seats). The 43 seats they have together are sufficient for a majority (38 needed). The parties agreed on 13 July 2024 to form a government and the new ministers were sworn in on 15 July 2024.

Government of the French Community – Degryse
Party	Name	Function
LR	Élisabeth Degryse	Minister President and Minister of Budget, Higher Education, School Buildings, Culture, Continuous Education, International Relations, and Francophony
MR	Valérie Glatigny	Vice-Minister President and Minister of Mandatory Education
LR	Valérie Lescrenier	Minister of Early Childhood and Youth Care
LR	Yves Coppieters	Minister of Health, Equal Opportunities, and Women's Rights
MR	Jacqueline Galant	Minister of Sports, Media, and Education in Wallonia & Brussels
MR	Adrien Dolimont	Minister of Scientific Research

=== Composition 2019–2024 ===
Following the 2019 Belgian regional elections, a government was formed on 13 September 2019, to be led by liberal Pierre-Yves Jeholet of the MR. The coalition consisted of the PS (28 seats), the MR (23 seats) and Ecolo (16 seats).

Government of the French Community – Jeholet
Party	Name	Function
MR	Pierre-Yves Jeholet (from 7 July 2023)	Minister President and Minister of Intra-Belgian Relations, International and European Relations, Development Cooperation, Education for Social Promotion and Sports
MR	Pierre-Yves Jeholet (until 7 July 2023)	Minister President and Minister of Intra-Belgian Relations, International and European Relations and Development Cooperation
MR	Françoise Bertieaux (from 7 July 2023)	Minister of Higher Education, University Hospitals, Youthcare, Justice, Youth and the Promotion of Brussels
MR	Valérie Glatigny (until 7 July 2023)	Minister of Higher Education, Scientific Research, Youth and Sports
PS	Caroline Désir	Minister of Education
PS	Frédéric Daerden	Minister of Budget, Public Functions and Equal Rights
Ecolo	Bénédicte Linard	Minister of Culture, Media, Day-care and Women's Rights

- On 7 July 2023, Valérie Glatigny resigned as Minister of Higher Education, Scientific Research, Youth and Sports due to having to undergo a medical intervention. Glatigny was replaced by Françoise Bertieaux who took over the portfolios Higher Education, University Hospitals, Youthcare, Justice, Youth and the Promotion of Brussels. The portfolios of Education for Social Promotion and Sports moved to Pierre-Yves Jeholet.

=== Composition 2014–2019 ===
Following the 25 May 2014 election, the PS (30 seats) and CDH (13 seats) parties formed a coalition.

Government of the French Community - Demotte III
Party	Name	Function
PS	Rudy Demotte	Minister President
PS	André Flahaut	Minister of Budget
PS	Isabelle Simonis	Minister of Youth and Equal Rights
PS	Rachid Madrane	Minister of Youth Aid, Justice and Brussels
PS	Jean-Claude Marcourt	Minister of Higher Education, Scientific Policy and Media
CDH	Joëlle Milquet (until April 2016)	Minister of Compulsory Education, Culture and Child Care
CDH	Marie-Martine Schyns (from April 2016)	Minister of Compulsory Education and School Buildings
CDH	Alda Greoli (from April 2016)	Minister of Culture, Child Care and Sports
CDH	René Collin	Minister of Agriculture and Tourism (Minister of Sports until April 2016)

- On 11 April 2016, Joëlle Milquet resigned as Minister of Compulsory Education, Culture and Child Care as she was accused of creating a conflict of interest in using her ministerial assistants to help her with a new election campaign in 2014. A few days later, Milquet was replaced by Marie-Martine Schyns and Alda Greoli. Schyns took over the Compulsory Education portfolio, which she was already in charge of during the previous legislature. Greoli took over Culture and Child Care from Milquet and also received the Sports portfolio from René Collin, who shifted to Agriculture and Tourism.

=== Composition 2009–2014 ===
Government of the French Community - Demotte II
Party	Name	Function
PS	Rudy Demotte	Minister President
PS	Jean-Claude Marcourt	Vice-Minister-President; Minister of Higher Education
PS	Fadila Laanan	Minister of Culture, Audiovisual Affairs, Health and Equal Rights
CDH	André Antoine	Vice-Minister-President; Minister of Budget, Finances and Sport
CDH	Marie-Dominique Simonet (until July 2013)	Minister of Education
CDH	Marie-Martine Schyns (from July 2013)	Minister of Education
Ecolo	Jean-Marc Nollet	Vice-Minister-President; Minister of Childhood, Scientific Research and Civil Service
Ecolo	Evelyne Huytebroeck	Minister of Youth

=== Composition 2004–2009 ===
Cabinet of the French Community - Arena/Demotte I
Party	Name	Function
PS	Rudy Demotte (from 20 March 2008)	Minister-President
PS	Marie Arena (until 20 March 2008)	Minister-President; Minister of Education
CDH	Marie-Dominique Simonet	Vice-Minister-President; Minister of Higher Education, Scientific Research and International Affairs
PS	Michel Daerden	Vice-Minister-President; Minister of Finance (Public Affairs and Sports are added on 20 July 2007)
PS	Claude Eerdekens (until 20 July 2007)	Minister of Public Affairs and Sports
PS	Marc Tarabella (from 20 July 2007)	Minister of Youth and Education of Social Promotion
PS	Fadila Laanan	Minister of Culture, Media and Youth (she lost Youth on 20 July 2007)
CDH	Catherine Fonck	Minister of Childhood, Assistance to Youth and Public Health

== See also ==
- Government of Wallonia
- Flemish Government
- Politics and Government of the Brussels-Capital Region
