= Belgian Federal Parliament =

Bicameral national legislature of Belgium

Coordinates: 50°50′48″N 4°21′53″E

Federal Parliament
(in official languages)
German	Föderales Parlament
French	Parlement fédéral
Dutch	Federaal Parlement
- Emblem of the Senate and the Emblem of the Chamber of Representatives

Type
- Type: Bicameral (de jure); Unicameral (de facto)
- Houses: • Senate • Chamber of Representatives

Leadership
- President of the Senate: Vincent Blondel, LE since 3 February 2025
- President of the Chamber: Peter De Roover, N-VA since 10 July 2024

Structure
- Seats: Senate: 60; Chamber of Representatives: 150
- Senate political groups: Government (32): N-VA (10); MR (8) (Note: PFF (1)); CD&V (5); LE (5); Vooruit (4); Opposition (27): VB (8); PS (6); PVDA-PTB (6); VLD (3); Groen (2); Ecolo (1); ProDG (1)
- Chamber political groups: Government (80): N-VA (23); MR (20); LE (14); Vooruit (13); CD&V (11); Opposition (70): VB (20); PS (16); PVDA-PTB (15); Open Vld (7); Groen (6); Ecolo (3); DéFI (1); Independent (1)

Elections
- Senate voting system: Indirect election
- Chamber voting system: Open list proportional representation within eleven constituencies, with 5% constituency electoral thresholds
- Last Chamber election: 9 June 2024

Meeting place
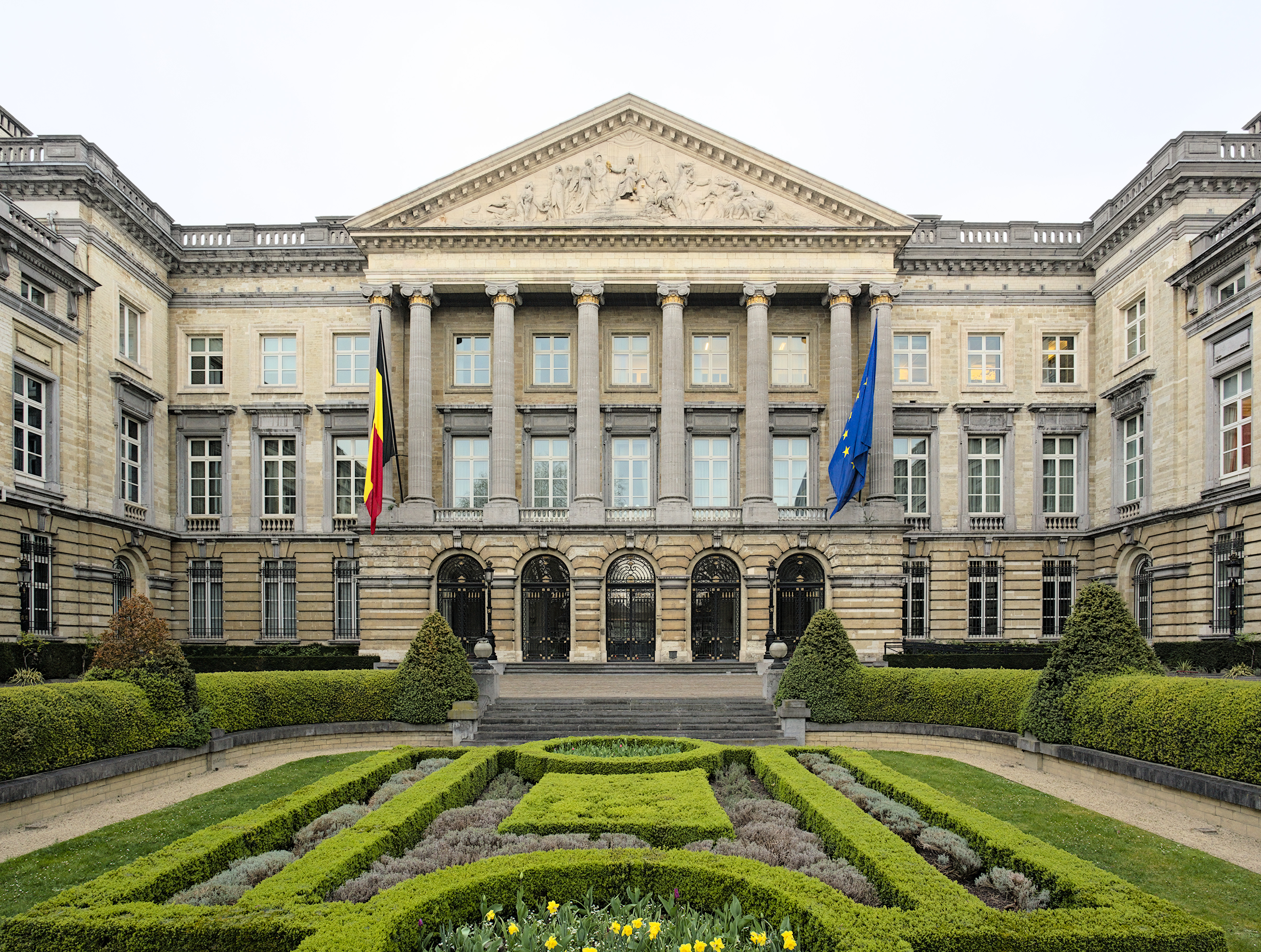
- Palace of the Nation, Brussels

Website
- www.fed-parl.be

The Federal Parliament (Dutch: Federaal Parlement; (Note: Dutch pronunciation: [feːdəˈraːl pɑrləˈmɛnt].) French: Parlement fédéral; (Note: French pronunciation: [paʁləmɑ̃ fedeʁal].) German: Föderales Parlament (Note: German pronunciation: [fødeˈʁaːləs paʁlaˈmɛnt].)) is the bicameral parliament of Belgium. It consists of the Chamber of Representatives (lower house) and the Senate (upper house). It sits in the Palace of the Nation in the centre of the nation's capital, Brussels.

The Chamber of Representatives is the primary legislative body; the Senate functions only as a meeting place of the federal communities and regions. The Belgian Constitution does not mention the Federal Parliament as such; it stipulates that the federal legislative power is exercised by the King and the Chamber of Representatives (and exceptionally the Senate), and defines when the United Chambers convene.

== Chamber of Representatives ==
The Chamber of Representatives (Dutch: Kamer van Volksvertegenwoordigers, French: Chambre des Représentants, German: Abgeordnetenkammer) holds its plenary meetings in the Palace of the Nation in Brussels (see below). Eligibility requirements for the Chamber are a minimum age of 21, citizenship, and residency in Belgium.

The number of seats in the Chamber is constitutionally set at 150 elected from 11 electoral districts. The districts are divided along linguistic lines: 5 Flemish (87 seats), 5 Walloon (48 seats), and the bilingual district of Brussels (15 seats). The districts are the provinces and the Brussels-Capital Region. Each district is given a number of seats proportional to its population (not the number of voters) ranging from 4 for Luxembourg to 24 for Antwerp.

All districts have an electoral threshold of 5%, except for Brussels and Leuven. After the dissolution of the former Brussels-Halle-Vilvoorde district in 2013, which encompassed both the 19 bilingual municipalities from the Brussels-Capital Region and some 35 Dutch-speaking municipalities in Flemish Brabant, including 7 with language facilities for French-speakers, voters in the 6 municipalities with language facilities surrounding Brussels have been given the right to vote in the Brussels district instead.

The current composition was elected at the federal elections of 2024.

== Senate ==
Since 2014, the Senate (Dutch: Senaat, French: Sénat, German: Senat) consists of 60 members. There are two categories of senators: co-opted senators and senators of community and regional parliaments.

50 senators are elected by and from the community and regional parliaments: 29 by the Flemish Parliament, 10 by the Parliament of the French Community, 8 by the Walloon Parliament, 2 by the French-language group of the Parliament of the Brussels-Capital Region, and 1 by the Parliament of the German-speaking Community.

The 10 other senators are co-opted: elected by the 50 other senators. Eligibility requirements for the Senate are identical to those for the Chamber.

Before 2014, the Senate consisted of 71 senators, only 21 of which were elected by the community parliaments. 25 were directly elected by the Flemish-speaking constituency and 15 by the French-speaking constituency. The last direct election of these 40 members occurred in the 2010 federal elections. The 2014 elections were the first ones with the reformed Senate.

The President of the Senate since 2014 has been Christine Defraigne (MR). The Senate holds its plenary meetings in the Palace of the Nation, Brussels.

== Legislative procedure ==
Since the elections of 21 May 1995, there has been a breakdown of powers between the Chamber of Representatives and the Senate, which resulted in the latter having fewer competencies than the Chamber of Representatives. Prior to that, the Chamber of Representatives and the Senate did the same parliamentary work on an equal footing, but now there are three different legislative procedures that can be followed: the one-chamber procedure, the optional two-chamber procedure, and the mandatory two-chamber procedure.

In certain matters, both Chambers have equal power. These include constitutional revisions, laws requiring a qualified majority, laws on the basic structure of the Belgian State, laws approving agreements of cooperation between the Federal State, the Communities and the Regions, laws on the approval of international treaties, and laws on the organization of the judiciary, the Council of State, and the Constitutional Court. In this case, the mandatory bicameral procedure applies, which means that both Chambers must pass exactly the same version of the bill.

For most other legislation, the Chamber of Representatives takes precedence over the Senate and the optional bicameral procedure applies. This means that the Senate may still intervene as a chamber of consideration and reflection. It has the opportunity to, within specific time limits, examine the bills adopted by the Chamber of Representatives and, if there is a reason to do so, make amendments. The Chamber may subsequently adopt or reject the amendments proposed by the Senate or make new proposals. The Senate can also submit a bill it has adopted to the Chamber, which can approve, reject or amend it. Whatever the case, the Chamber has the final word.

The one-chamber procedure applies in cases where the Chamber of Representatives has the sole power to legislate. It means that the Senate cannot intervene and that the Senate's approval is not required for the bill to pass. The matters for which the Chamber of Representatives is exclusively responsible include naturalizations, ministerial liability, State budget, and accounts and military quotas.

== United Chambers ==
The United Chambers (Dutch: Verenigde Kamers, French: Chambres réunies, German: Vereinigten Kammern) is the name given to the body created when both chambers of the Federal Parliament meet in joint session. The United Chambers are convened only on certain occasions enumerated in the Belgian Constitution: the King must take the constitutional oath before the United Chambers, in accordance with article 91 of the Constitution, and the United Chambers must provide for the regency if the successor to the Crown is a minor or the King is unable to reign, in accordance with articles 92 and 93 of the Constitution. The last session of the United Chambers took place on 21 July 2013, when King Philippe took the constitutional oath.

== Palace of the Nation ==
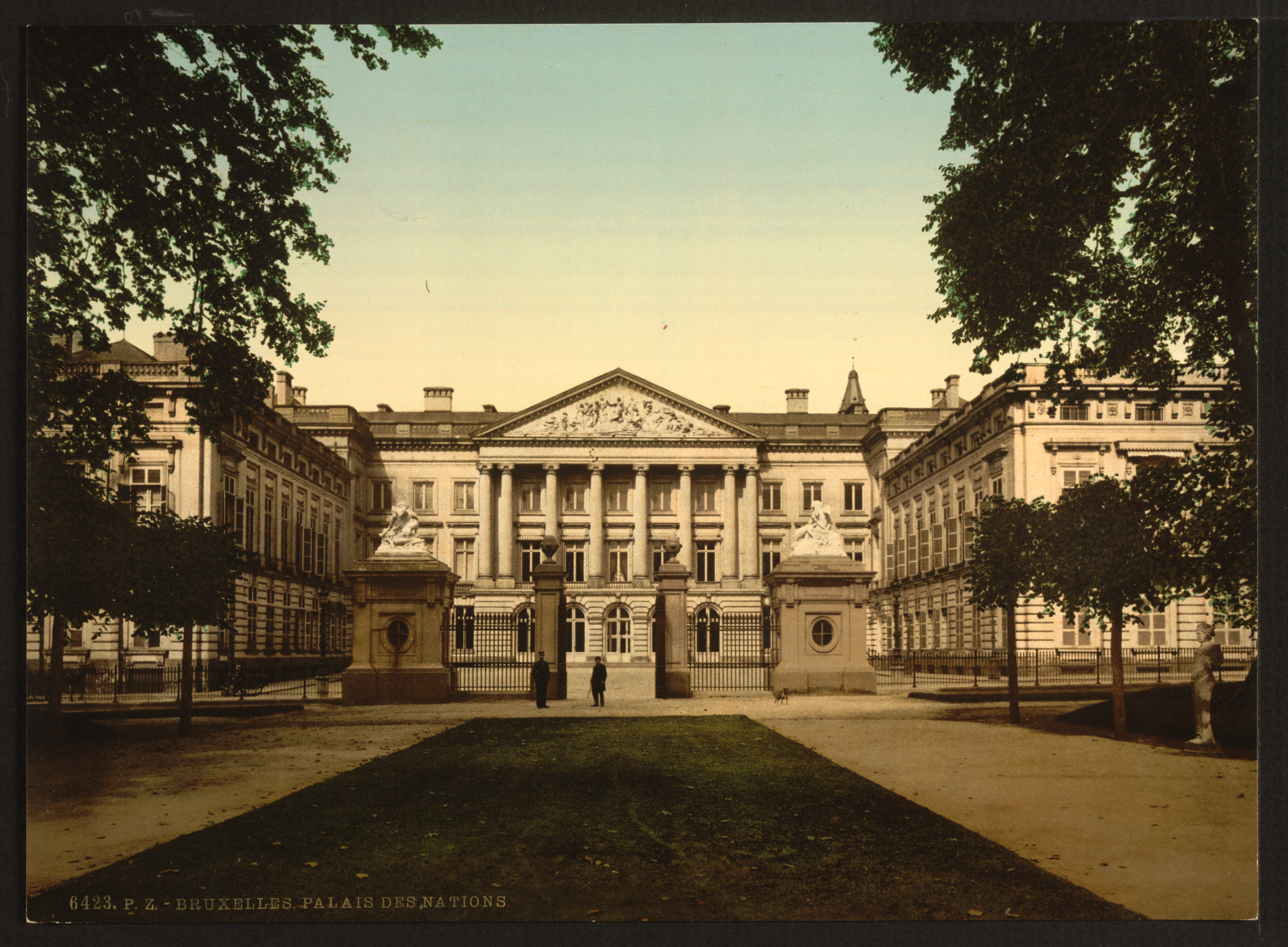
A view of the Palace of the Nation in the 1890s

The Palace of the Nation (Dutch: Paleis der Natie, French: Palais de la Nation, German: Palast der Nation) was built from 1778 to 1783 to a neoclassical design by the French architect Gilles-Barnabé Guimard and includes sculptures by Gilles-Lambert Godecharle. Under Austrian rule, it housed the Sovereign Council of Brabant before being used as a courthouse during the French period. During the Dutch period, it was one of two homes of the Parliament of the United Kingdom of the Netherlands, the other being in The Hague. Following Belgian independence in 1830, the Provisional Government of Belgium and Belgian National Congress moved into the building and the first session of the House of Representatives and Senate was held there a year later.

The building stands across the street from Brussels Park's northern entrance, near the site of the former palace of the Dukes of Brabant, which was destroyed by fire in 1731, and has itself been badly damaged by fire, in 1820 and 1883. In the 1930s, a bunker was built underneath the park, connected by tunnels to the House of Parliament.

== See also ==
- Politics of Belgium
- Court of Audit of Belgium
- List of political parties in Belgium
- Commission communautaire française
- Vlaamse Gemeenschapscommissie
- List of legislatures by country
