= French Community of Belgium =

Linguistic community of Belgium

French Community Communauté française
- Community
- Flag Coat of arms

- Coordinates: 50°30′N 4°45′E
- Country: Belgium
- Regions: Wallonia; Brussels
- Cultural Community: 1970
- Established: 1980
- Capital: City of Brussels

Government
  - Executive: Government of the French Community
  - Governing parties (2024-2029): MR and Les Engagés
  - Minister-President: Élisabeth Degryse (Les Engagés)
  - Legislature: Parliament of the French Community
  - Speaker: Benoît Dispa (Les Engagés)

Population
  - Total: ~4,500,000
- Celebration Day: 27 September
- Official language: French
- Recognized regional languages: Brusselian; Champenois; Carolingian Franconian; Moselle Franconian (Luxembourgish); Lorrain (Gaumais); Picard; Walloon
- Website: www.cfwb.be
- The Walloon flag was chosen as flag of the French minority of Belgium in 1975. It was adopted by the Walloon Region in 1998.

In Belgium, the French Community (French: Communauté française (de Belgique), pronounced [kɔmynote fʁɑ̃sɛːz də bɛlʒik], CFB) (Note: Dutch: Franse Gemeenschap (van België) [ˈfrɑnsə ɣəˈmeːnˌsxɑp vɑm ˈbɛlɣijə]; German: Französische Gemeinschaft (Belgiens) [fʁanˈtsøːzɪʃə ɡəˈmaɪnʃaft ˈbɛlɡi̯əns].) refers to one of the three constituent constitutional linguistic communities. Since 2011, the French minority has used the name Wallonia-Brussels Federation (French: Fédération Wallonie-Bruxelles, pronounced [fedeʁɑsjɔ̃ walɔni bʁysɛl], FW-B), (Note: Dutch: Federatie Wallonië-Brussel [feːdeːˈraː(t)si ʋɑˈloːnijə ˌbrʏsəl]; German: Föderation Wallonie-Brüssel [fødeʁaˈtsi̯oːn valoˈniː ˈbʁʏsl̩].) which is controversial because its name in the Belgian Constitution has not changed and because it is seen as a political statement. The name "French Community" refers to the French language and not to France. As such, the French minority of Belgium is sometimes rendered in English as "the French-speaking Community of Belgium" for clarity, in analogy to the German-speaking Community of Belgium.

The Community has its own parliament, government, and administration. It and its predecessor entity have used the flag of Wallonia since 1975.

== History ==
Belgium was transformed from the unitary into a federal state. The first state reform of 1970 introduced the "cultural communities" including the French Cultural Community (Communauté culturelle française). This was re-organised and expanded into the French Community (Communauté française) through the second state reform in 1980. Further reforms expanded its legal competences.

== Description ==
The French Community of Belgium extends over 4.5 million people, of whom:

- 3.6 million live in the Walloon Region (that is almost the entirety of the inhabitants of this region, apart from people who live in the German-speaking communes, who number around 70,000);
- 900,000 living in the Brussels Capital Region (out of 1.2 million inhabitants).

The French Community has no jurisdiction over French speakers living in the Flemish Region. Their number is unknown, given the absence of sub-nationality status and the discouragement of linguistic criteria in census-taking. Estimates of the French-speaking population of Flanders vary from 120,000, around 200,000, to around 300,000.

The French Community of Belgium extends over about 40% of the total population of Belgium; 60% of the population belongs to the Flemish Community, and 1% to the German-speaking Community.

== Alternative name ==
For years there have been hints that the Community wanted to better demonstrate the link between Wallonia and Brussels, the two main territories where the French speakers are in the majority. These include the creation of several organisations such as Wallonie-Bruxelles International, a public body in charge of international cultural affairs set up jointly by the French Community, the Walloon Region and the Commission communautaire française (COCOF, a French-speaking institution of the Brussels-Capital Region). The concept of "Wallonie-Bruxelles" is however not mentioned in the Belgian constitution, and appeared only in a few official legal texts, such as the "Arrêté du Gouvernement de la Communauté française fixant le code de qualité et de l'accueil" of 17 December 2003, mentioning the name "Communauté Wallonie-Bruxelles", and the "Arrêté du Gouvernement de la Communauté française approuvant le programme quinquennal de promotion de la santé 2004–2008" of 30 April 2004, mentioning the name "Communauté française Wallonie-Bruxelles".

In May 2011, the parliament of the Community voted a resolution according to which it would, from then on, use the name "Wallonia-Brussels Federation" (French: "Fédération Wallonie-Bruxelles") for all its communications, campaigns and in the administration. The move was immediately interpreted as aggressive by the Flemish authorities, the Minister-President of Flanders announcing he would not recognize the federation as an official body and saying that documents that would be sent by the federation would be unconstitutional and therefore would not exist.

That name also obscures the fact that this institution does not represent the Flemings living in Brussels, nor their local Flemish Community Commission ('Vlaamse Gemeenschapscommissie', or VGC) nor the Brussels-Capital Region.

While the authorities of the Community acknowledge the fact that the new name is not mentioned in the Belgian Constitution, they insist that their move is not illegal, as long as the new name is used as an additional name for the Community and is not used when it could create a legal issue (such as with the official texts published in the Belgian Official Journal).

Although the then Belgian Prime Minister Yves Leterme said that the federal government would not use the new name and the Flemish VRT decided not to use the new name in its news programs either, it is used by the French-speaking media, including the RTBF public network, which is fully controlled by the Community. The independent/private media uses both the alternative and the original designation.

In September 2011, the Community adopted a new logo that incorporates its new name.

== Politics and government ==
The French Community of Belgium is governed by the Parliament of the French Community, which selects the executive branch, the Government of the French Community.

=== Parliament ===
The Parliament of the French Community (French: Parlement de la Communauté française or PCF) is the legislative assembly of the French Community of Belgium based in the Quartier Royal. It consists of all 75 members of the Walloon Parliament except German-speaking members (currently two) who are substituted by French-speaking members from the same party, and 19 members elected by the French linguistic group of the Parliament of the Brussels-Capital Region within the former body. These members are elected for a term of five years.

The current president of the Parliament of the French Community is Benoît Dispa (LE).

==== Current composition (2024–2029) ====
Affiliation		Members
•	Reformist Movement (MR)	31
	Socialist Party (PS)	24
•	Les Engages (LE)	19
	Workers' Party of Belgium (PTB)	12
	Ecolo	7
	Democratic Federalist Independent (DéFI)	1
Total		94

Note: Government coalition parties are denoted with bullets (•)

=== Executive ===
The Cabinet of the French Community of Belgium (French: Gouvernement de la Communauté française) is the executive branch of the French Community, and it too sits in Brussels. It consists of a number of ministers chosen by the parliament and is headed by a Minister-President.

Government of the French Community – Degryse
Party	Name	Function
LR	Élisabeth Degryse	Minister President and Minister of Budget, Higher Education, School Buildings, Culture, Continuous Education, International Relations, and Francophony
MR	Valérie Glatigny	Vice-Minister President and Minister of Mandatory Education
LR	Valérie Lescrenier	Minister of Early Childhood and Youth Care
LR	Yves Coppieters	Minister of Health, Equal Opportunities, and Women's Rights
MR	Jacqueline Galant	Minister of Sports, Media, and Education in Wallonia & Brussels
MR	Adrien Dolimont	Minister of Scientific Research

=== List of minister-presidents of the French Community ===
Philippe Moureaux (1st term)	22 December 1981 – 9 December 1985	PS
Philippe Monfils	9 December 1985 – 2 February 1988	PRL
Philippe Moureaux (2nd term)	2 February – 9 May 1988	PS
Valmy Féaux	17 May 1988 – 7 January 1992	PS
Bernard Anselme	7 January 1992 – 4 May 1993	PS
Laurette Onkelinx	4 May 1993 – 13 July 1999	PS
Hervé Hasquin	13 July 1999 – 19 July 2004	PRL
Marie Arena	19 July 2004 – 20 March 2008	PS
Rudy Demotte	20 March 2008 – 17 September 2019	PS
Pierre-Yves Jeholet	17 September 2019 – incumbent	MR

== See also ==
- Brussels-Capital Region
- French Community Commission
- Communities and regions of Belgium
- Wallonia
- Rattachism
  - Hypothetical partition of Belgium
