= Ismaël Nuino =

Belgian politician (born 2000)

Member of the Chamber of Representatives
- Incumbent
- Assumed office 18 July 2024
- Preceded by: Élisabeth Degryse
- Constituency: Brussels

Personal details
- Born: 1 November 2000 (age 25)
- Party: Les Engagés

Ismaël Nuino (born 1 November 2000) is a Belgian politician of Les Engagés. Since 2024, he has been a member of the Chamber of Representatives. He succeeded Élisabeth Degryse and became the youngest member of the chamber. Since 2022, he has served as leader of Les Engagés' youth wing Génération Engagée.
