= Laurette Onkelinx =

Belgian politician (born 1958)

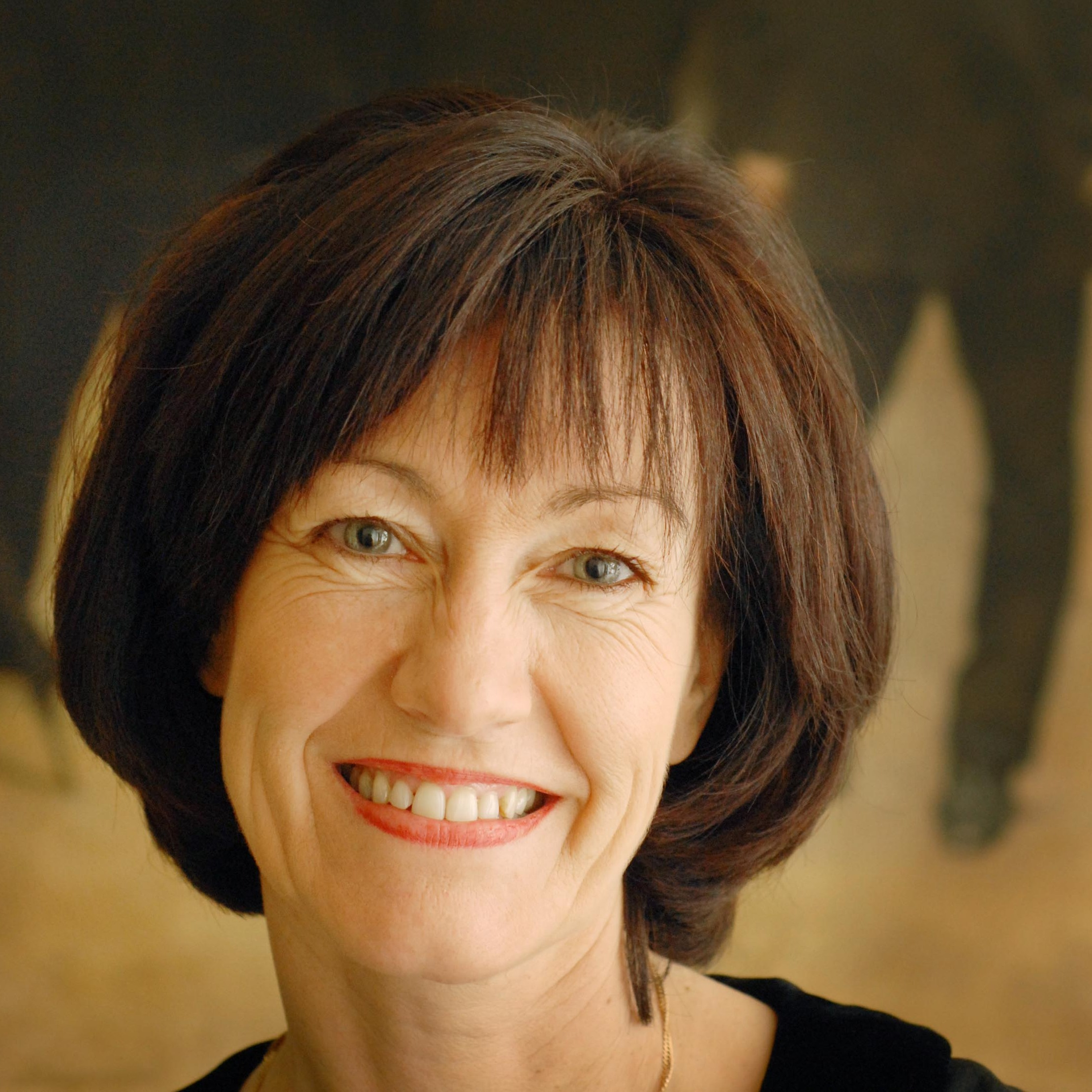
- Onkelinx in 2006

Minister of Social Affairs and Health
- In office 21 December 2007 – 11 October 2014
- Prime Minister: Guy Verhofstadt; Yves Leterme; Herman Van Rompuy; Yves Leterme; Elio Di Rupo
- Preceded by: Rudy Demotte
- Succeeded by: Maggie De Block

Minister of Justice
- In office 11 July 2003 – 21 December 2007
- Prime Minister: Guy Verhofstadt
- Preceded by: Marc Verwilghen
- Succeeded by: Jo Vandeurzen

Minister of Labour and Transport
- In office 5 May 2003 – 11 July 2003
- Prime Minister: Guy Verhofstadt
- Preceded by: Herself (Labour); Isabelle Durant (Transport)
- Succeeded by: Peter Vanvelthoven (Labour); Renaat Landuyt (Transport)

Minister of Labour
- In office 13 July 1999 – 5 May 2003
- Prime Minister: Guy Verhofstadt
- Preceded by: Miet Smet
- Succeeded by: Herself (Labour and Transport)

Minister-President of the French Community
- In office 6 May 1993 – 13 July 1999
- Preceded by: Bernard Anselme
- Succeeded by: Hervé Hasquin

Minister of Social Integration, Public Health and Environment
- In office 7 March 1992 – 6 May 1993
- Prime Minister: Jean-Luc Dehaene
- Preceded by: Philippe Busquin
- Succeeded by: Jacques Santkin

Personal details
- Born: 2 October 1958 (age 67) Ougrée, Belgium
- Party: Socialist Party
- Spouse(s): Abbès Guenned (Divorced); Marc Uyttendaele
- Relatives: Julien Uyttendaele (stepson)
- Education: University of Liège

Laurette A. J. Onkelinx (born 2 October 1958) is a Belgian politician from the Francophone Socialist Party. She was the Deputy Prime Minister – Minister of Social Affairs and Public Health in the Belgian federal government, i.e., the Di Rupo Government, which took office on 6 December 2011.

== Early life and education ==
Born in Ougrée to Gaston Onkelinx and Germaine Ali Bakir, of Kabyle origin, she graduated in law at the University of Liège, after which she worked as a lawyer for ten years. At the age of 30 she was elected to the Belgian Chamber of Representatives.

Her father, Gaston Onkelinx, originally a Dutch-speaking migrant from Flemish Limburg to francophone Wallonia, has long been mayor of Seraing (near Liège) and member of the House of Representatives (1974–1987). Her grandfather, Maurice Onkelinx, was alderman and mayor of Jeuk in Limburg and lost his civil rights for some years after the Second World War. Her older brother, Alain Onkelinx, has been a member of the Regional Parliament of Wallonia since September 2005. She speaks French and Dutch.

== Political career ==
First elected to the Belgian House of Representatives in 1988, she held several ministerial posts without any interruption from 1992 until 2014:

- Minister of Social Integration, Public Health and Environment (1992–1993)
- Minister-President and Minister of the Civil Service, Child Healthcare and Promotion of Health in the French Community (1993–1995)
- Minister-President and Minister of Education, Media, Youth, Child Healthcare and Promotion of Health in the French Community (1995–1999)
- Deputy Prime Minister and Minister of Labour (1999–2003)
- Deputy Prime Minister and Minister of Labour and Transport (2003)
- Deputy Prime Minister and Minister of Justice (July 2003 – December 2007)
- Minister of Social Affairs and Public Health (December 2007 – October 2014)

== Controversy ==
When Turkish terrorist Fehriye Erdal was sentenced to four years imprisonment by a Bruges court on 28 February 2006, it turned out that she had shaken off the Belgian secret service, which had the responsibility of following her since 23 February 2006 (Erdal had been under house arrest since 2000, and living in the same building as the DHKP-C secretariat). Both Laurette Onkelinx and Minister of the Interior Patrick Dewael came under fire for this incident; the Christian Democratic and Flemish party (CD&V) and Vlaams Belang demanded the resignation of both of them on 6 March 2006.

In July 2006, Onkelinx came under heavy political fire again when one of Belgian's most notorious criminals, Murat Kaplan, did not return from a weekend-leave, which she had signed off. In August 2006 she came again under heavy fire when 28 prisoners managed to escape from a prison in Dendermonde. In September 2006, it was reported that the criminal Victor Hoxha had returned to Belgium – he had been deported from Belgium earlier in 2006, and told not to return for ten years. Prime minister Guy Verhofstadt, of the Flemish Liberals and Democrats (VLD), asked the minister to refrain from releasing any criminals prematurely in the coming three months, but she refused this demand. This came just before the government was to prepare its budget for the coming year, and the October municipal elections.

CD&V and Vlaams Belang again called for the resignation of the minister, but it was unknown how far the VLD would go in supporting the minister (and accordingly, the then current federal government). On 23 September, it was reported that another criminal did not return from day-leave. Tony Van Parys, of the CD&V party, called it "incomprehensible that someone like Azzouzi [the criminal in question] would get penitentiary leave." The cabinet's crisis was averted the next week, when a deal was struck between the VLD and PS, allowing criminals only to be released on parole, in the next months, after consent by their victim (or the victim's family).

On 6 October, two days before the Belgian municipal elections, Laurette Onkelinx was hit with a pie at an election event in Schaerbeek. The perpetrator was Benito Franscesconi, a 78-year-old man, who has a history of "civil disobedience." Franscesconi has made himself a civil party to many court cases in which he had no direct interest.

First married to Abbès Guenned, a Belgian of Moroccan descent, Onkelinx divorced him in 1997–1998; Morocco asked for Guenned's extradition, accusing him of drug trafficking (he was stopped on 31 July 1997 at Zaventem airport, while in possession of a diplomatic passport), a charge which was later dropped. He was also arrested in Turkey, but released after strong influence from the Belgian government. At that time, Onkelinx was presiding over the government of Belgium's French Community. Onkelinx then married barrister Marc Uyttendaele. Witnesses to this marriage were both their former husband and wife. In 2003, Guenned became an adviser to Onkelinx' cabinet, charged with the preparation of the election of the Belgian advisory Muslim council, and dealing with town management but, especially, with communication between the cabinet and the Islamic associations.

In 2009, Onkelinx criticized Pope Benedict XVI over his comments that the distribution of condoms without prior education only worsened the AIDS crisis.

In 2014, it was revealed that her Ministry had hired the firm of her own husband, Marc Uyttendaele, as a legal consultant, at a cost of 245,000 euros.

On 13 September 2017, Onkelincx announced she would not be a candidate for the 2019 elections.

Political offices
Preceded by Philippe Busquin	Minister of Social Integration, Public Health and Environment; 1992–1993	Succeeded by Jacques Santkin
Preceded by Bernard Anselme	Minister-President of the French Community; 1993–1999	Succeeded by Hervé Hasquin
Preceded by Miet Smet	Minister of Labour; 1999–2003	Succeeded by Herself as Minister of Labour and Transport
Preceded by Herself as Minister of Labour	Minister of Labour and Transport; 2003	Succeeded by Peter Vanvelthoven as Minister of Labour
Preceded by Isabelle Durant as Minister of Transport	Minister of Labour and Transport; 2003	Succeeded by Renaat Landuyt as Minister of Transport
Preceded by Marc Verwilghen	Minister of Justice; 2003–2007	Succeeded by Jo Vandeurzen
Preceded by Rudy Demotte	Minister of Social Affairs and Public Health; 2007–2014	Succeeded by Maggie De Block
