= Jean-Claude Marcourt =

Belgian politician

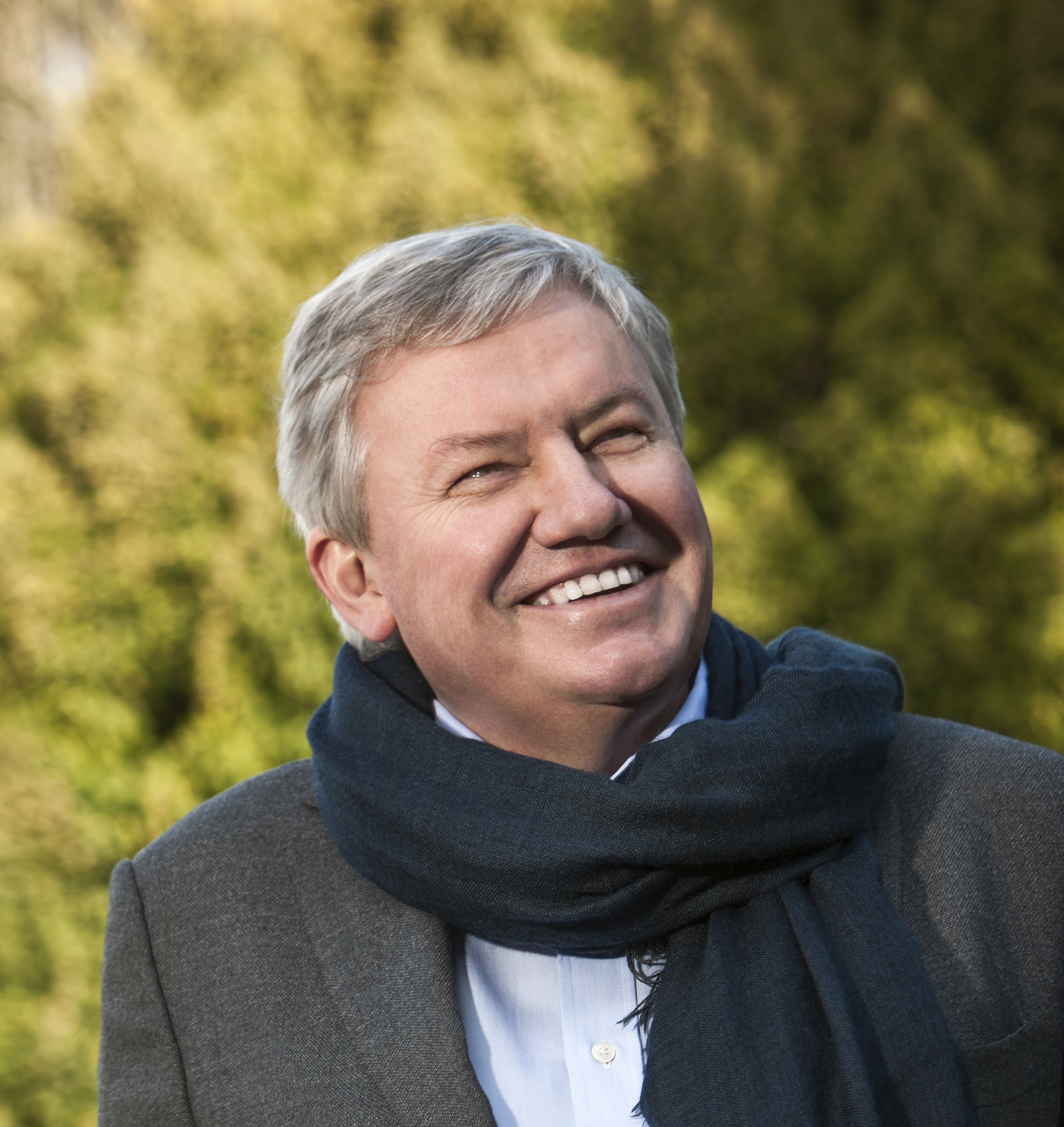
- Born: 16 October 1956 (age 69); Awans, Liège Province, Belgium
- Occupation: politician

Jean-Claude Marcourt (born 16 October 1956) is a Belgian politician who has been serving as President of the Parliament of Wallonia since 2019. He was the Vice-Minister-President and Minister of Economy and Foreign Affairs of the Walloon government and Vice-Minister-President and Minister of Higher Education of the Government of the French Community. He is a member of the Belgian Francophone Socialist Party (PS).
