= Hervé Hasquin =

Belgian historian (1942–2026)

- Hasquin in 2018

Minister-President of the French Community
- In office 14 July 1999 – 18 July 2004
- Preceded by: Laurette Onkelinx
- Succeeded by: Marie Arena

Personal details
- Born: 31 December 1942 Charleroi, German-occupied Belgium and Northern France
- Died: 13 July 2026 (aged 83)
- Party: Reformist Movement

Hervé Hasquin (31 December 1942 – 13 July 2026) was a Belgian historian, politician and academic who was a university professor at the Université libre de Belgique.

Hasquin died on 13 July 2026, at the age of 83.

== Honours ==
- Alumni Prize (University Foundation) (1977)
- Literary Prize of the Parliament of the French Community (1981)
- Eugène Lameere Prize of the Royal Academy of Science, Letters and Fine Arts of Belgium (1991)
- Honorary degree from Babeș-Bolyai University of Cluj-Napoca (1992)
- Socio de Honor of the Comillas Pontifical University, Madrid (1996)
- Sociétaire honoris causa of the European Academy of Sciences and Arts (2000)
- Member of the Royal Academy of Science, Letters and Fine Arts of Belgium (2002)
- Corresponding Member of the Class of Historical and Philosophical Sciences of the Tuscan Academy of Sciences and Letters of Florence (2009)
- Foreign Corresponding Academician of the Lisbon Academy of Sciences (2014)

== Orders ==
- Commander in the Order of Leopold II (Belgium, 1984)
- Commander in the Order of the Lion (Senegal, 1987).
- Knight in the Legion of Honour (France, 1989)
- Commander in the Order of Leopold (Belgium, 1995)
- Grand Officer in the Order of Leopold(Belgium, 1999)
- Knight Grand Cross in the Order of the Crown (Belgium, 2004)
- Commander in the Walloon Merit (Belgium, 2011)
- Commander in the Ordre des Palmes académiques (France, 2013)
- Officer in the Order of Merit of the Republic of Poland (Poland, 2015)
- Commander in the Order of Cultural Merit (Romania, 2015)

== Sources ==
- academieroyale.be

Political offices
| Preceded by Laurette Onkelinx | Minister-President of the French Community; 1999–2004 | Succeeded by Marie Arena |
