= Julien Uyttendaele =

Belgian politician (born 1991)

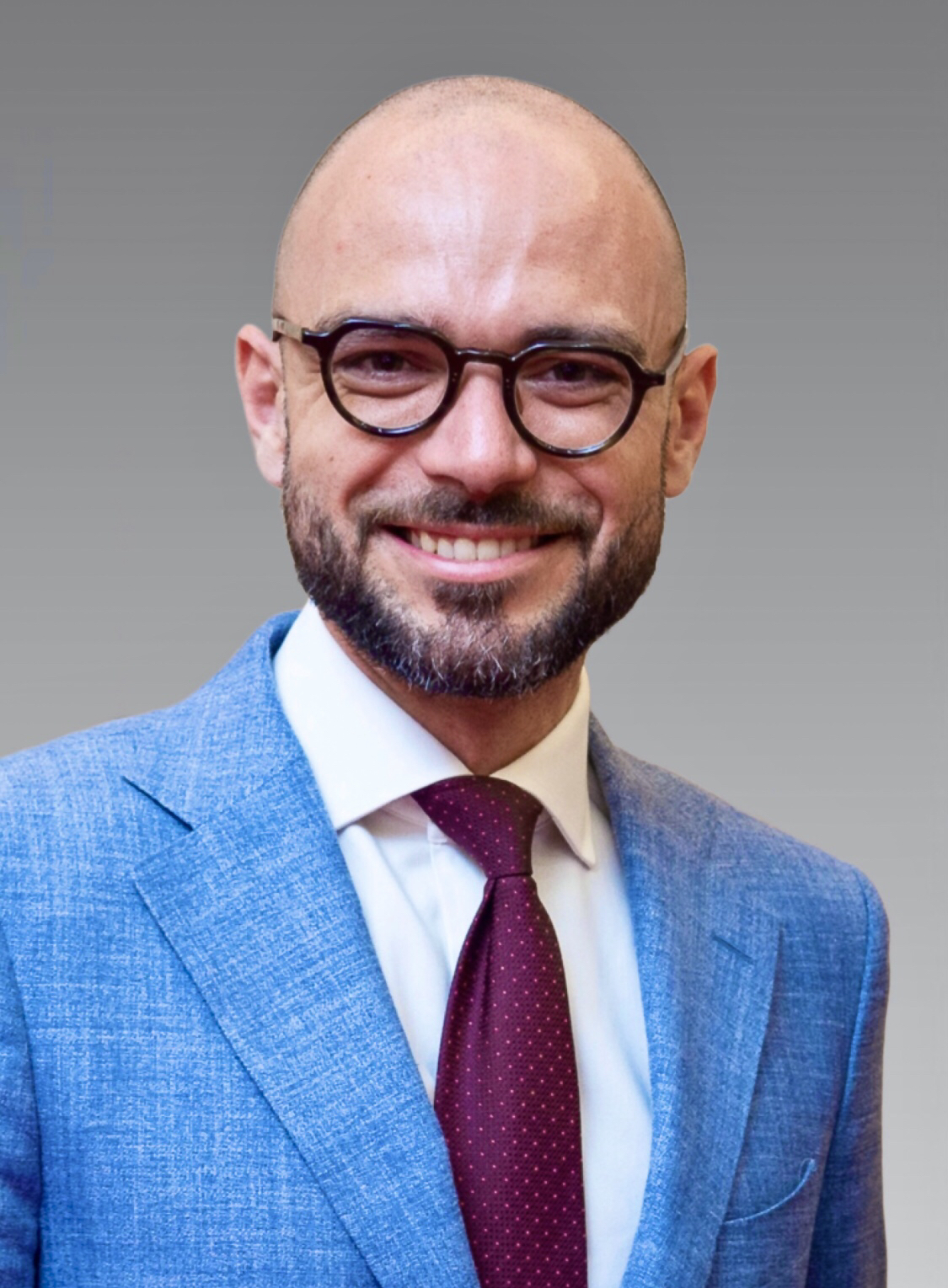
- Uyttendaele in 2023

Member of the Senate
- In office 4 July 2019 – 18 July 2024
- Appointed by: Parliament of the Brussels-Capital Region

Personal details
- Born: 4 May 1991 (age 34)
- Party: Socialist Party
- Relatives: Laurette Onkelinx (step-mother)

Julien Uyttendaele (born 4 May 1991) is a Belgian politician. From 2019 to 2024, he was a member of the Senate. From 2014 to 2024, he was a member of the Parliament of the Brussels-Capital Region.
