= Marie Arena =

Belgian politician (born 1966)

Marie Arena MEP
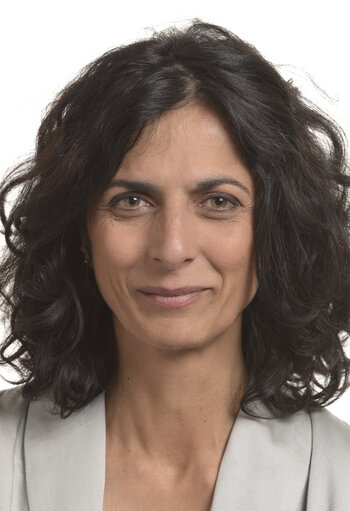
- Marie Arena Official Portrait

Member of the European Parliament
- In office 1 July 2014 – 16 July 2024
- Constituency: Belgium

Minister-President of the French Community
- In office 19 July 2004 – 20 March 2008
- Preceded by: Hervé Hasquin
- Succeeded by: Rudy Demotte

Personal details
- Born: 17 December 1966 (age 59) Mons, Belgium
- Party: Belgian: PS; EU: PES

Marie Arena (born 17 December 1966) is a Belgian politician who was a Member of the European Parliament (MEP) from 2014 to 2024. She was a member of the Socialist Party (PS), part of the Party of European Socialists (PES).

== Career in national politics ==
From 2000 to 2009, Arena held several ministerial functions in various regional and federal governments. From 2000 to 2003, she was Walloon Minister of Employment and Training. She then was Federal Minister of the Civil Service, Social Integration, Cities and Equal Opportunities in the Verhofstadt II Government from 12 July 2003 to 20 July 2004. She was the Minister-President of the French Community of Belgium from July 2004 until March 2008. Until 17 July 2009, she was also Federal Minister for Social Integration, Pensions and Large Cities in the Leterme I Government, which took office on 20 March 2008.

== Member of the European Parliament ==
Arena was elected as an MEP in the 2014 European Parliament election. During her first term, she served on the Committee on International Trade (INTA), the Committee on Women's Rights and Gender Equality (FEMM), the delegation to the ACP–EU Joint Parliamentary Assembly, and the delegation to the Parliamentary Assembly of the Union for the Mediterranean. Since the 2019 European Parliament election, she has been a member of the Committee on Foreign Affairs. In 2020, she also joined the Special Committee on Beating Cancer.

From 2019 to 2023, Arena chaired the Subcommittee on Human Rights. In this capacity, she was part of the Democracy Support and Election Coordination Group (DEG), which oversees the Parliament's election observation missions. In addition to her committee assignments, Arena was a member of the European Parliament Intergroup on Cancer, the European Parliament Intergroup on Children's Rights, the European Parliament Intergroup on LGBT Rights, and the Responsible Business Conduct Working Group. She did not stand for re-election in the 2024 European Parliament election.

== Qatargate ==
Amid the Qatar corruption scandal at the European Parliament, Arena's offices were searched in December 2022. She resigned her post as chair of the subcommittee on human rights on 11 January 2023, following allegations that she failed to declare a trip in May 2022 which had been paid for by the Qatari government. In July 2023, Belgian police raided Arena's house in Brussels.

In January 2025, she confirmed to media that she had been charged with belonging to a criminal organization in connection with the Qatargate case.

== Honours ==
- Belgium: Grand Officer of the Order of Leopold, 2010.

== See also ==
- 2014 European Parliament election in Belgium
- 2019 European Parliament election in Belgium

Political offices
Preceded by Hervé Hasquin	Minister-President of the French Community; 2004–2008	Succeeded by Rudy Demotte
