= Minister-President of the French Community =

Head of the government of the French Community (Belgium)

The minister-president of the French Community of Belgium (French: Ministre-président de la Communauté française de Belgique) is the head of the Government of the French Community of Belgium.

== List of officeholders ==
No.	Portrait	Name (Born–Died)	Term of office			Political party	Government	
No.	Portrait	Name (Born–Died)	Took office	Left office	Time in office	Political party	Government	
1		Philippe Moureaux (1939–2018)	22 December 1981	9 December 1985	3 years, 351 days	PS	Moureaux I	PS, PRL
2		Philippe Monfils (1939– )	9 December 1985	2 February 1988	2 years, 54 days	PRL	Monfils	PRL, PSC
3		Philippe Moureaux (1939–2018)	12 February 1988	9 May 1988	87 days	PS	Moureaux II	PS, PSC
4		Valmy Féaux (1933– )	11 May 1988	7 January 1992	3 years, 240 days	PS	Féaux	PS, PSC
5		Bernard Anselme (1945– )	7 January 1992	4 May 1993	1 year, 118 days	PS	Anselme	PS, PSC
6		Laurette Onkelinx (1958– )	6 May 1993	13 July 1999	6 years, 67 days	PS	Onkelinx I	PS, PSC
6		Laurette Onkelinx (1958– )	6 May 1993	13 July 1999	6 years, 67 days	PS	Onkelinx II	PS, PSC
7		Hervé Hasquin (1942–2026)	14 July 1999	18 July 2004	5 years, 4 days	PRL/MR	Hasquin	PRL/MR, PS, Ecolo
8		Marie Arena (1966– )	19 July 2004	20 March 2008	3 years, 244 days	PS	Arena	PS, cdH
9		Rudy Demotte (1963– )	20 March 2008	13 September 2019	11 years, 176 days	PS	Demotte I	PS, cdH
9		Rudy Demotte (1963– )	20 March 2008	13 September 2019	11 years, 176 days	PS	Demotte II	PS, cdH, Ecolo
9		Rudy Demotte (1963– )	20 March 2008	13 September 2019	11 years, 176 days	PS	Demotte III	PS, cdH
10		Pierre-Yves Jeholet (1968– )	13 September 2019	15 July 2024	4 years, 306 days	MR	Jeholet	PS, MR, Ecolo
11		Élisabeth Degryse (1980– )	15 July 2024	Incumbent	2 years, 0 days	LE	Degryse	LE, MR

== See also ==
- Prime Minister of Belgium
- Minister-President of the Brussels-Capital Region
- Minister-President of Flanders
- Minister-President of the German-speaking Community
- Minister-President of Wallonia
