= Yves Coppieters =

Belgian politician (born 1968)

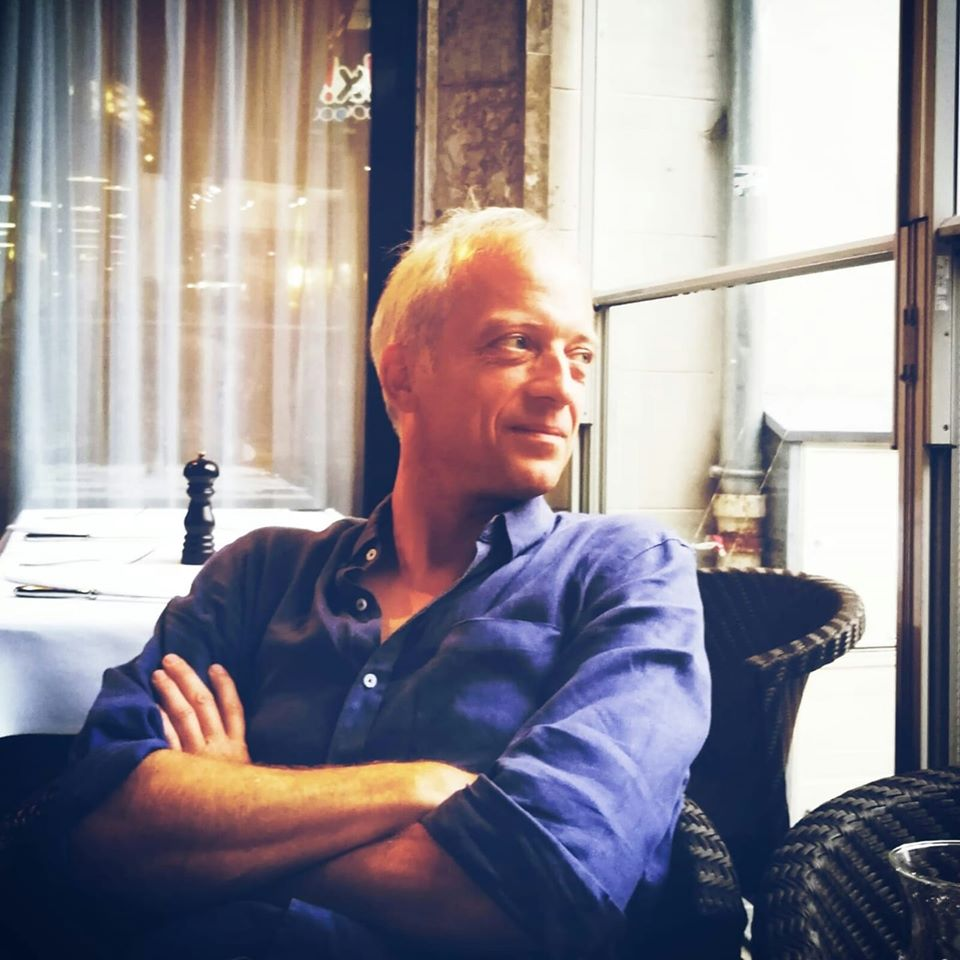
- Coppieters in 2024

Minister of Health, Environment, Solidarity and Social Economy of Wallonia
- Incumbent
- Assumed office 15 July 2024

Minister of Health, Equal Opportunities and Women's Rights of the French Community
- Incumbent
- Assumed office 15 July 2024

Member of the Chamber of Representatives
- In office 10 July 2024 – 15 July 2024
- Succeeded by: Xavier Dubois
- Constituency: Walloon Brabant

Personal details
- Born: 27 November 1968 (age 57)
- Party: Les Engagés

Yves Coppieters (born 27 November 1968) is a Belgian epidemiologist and politician. Since 2024, he has served as minister of health, environment, solidarity and social economy in the government of Wallonia, and as minister of health, equal opportunities and women's rights in the government of the French Community. In July 2024, he was a member of the Chamber of Representatives.
