= Rudy Demotte =

Belgian politician (born 1963)

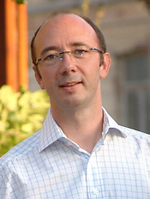

Minister-President of the French Community
- In office 20 March 2008 – 17 September 2019
- Preceded by: Marie Arena
- Succeeded by: Pierre-Yves Jeholet

Minister-President of Wallonia
- In office 19 July 2007 – 22 July 2014
- Preceded by: Elio Di Rupo
- Succeeded by: Paul Magnette

Personal details
- Born: 3 June 1963 (age 63) Ronse, Belgium
- Party: Socialist Party
- Education: Université libre de Bruxelles

Rudy W.G. Demotte (born 3 June 1963 in Ronse) is a Belgian socialist politician who served as the 12th Minister-President of Wallonia (2007–2014), replacing Elio Di Rupo, one month after a historical defeat of the socialists in the federal election.

He also served as Minister-President of the French Community between 2008 and 2019.

From 1988 to 1990 he served on the cabinet of the Minister of Social Affairs. He was first elected to the Belgian House of Representatives in 1995 and was reelected in 1999 and 2003. In 1999, he became the federal Minister for Economic Affairs and Scientific Research. In 2002, he became the Minister for Budget, Culture and Sport of the French Community of Belgium. From July 2003 to 2007, he became Minister for Social Affairs and Public Health in the federal government. Having served as a council member from 1994 on, he was mayor of Flobecq (2000–2012). Having moved, since 2013 Demotte was mayor of Tournai until 2018.

== Orders ==
Officer of the Order of Legion of Honour

Belgium
Grand officier Order of Leopold (2014)
Japan
Order of the Rising Sun, 3rd Class. (2016)
Grand Officier de l'ordre de la Pléiade (2024)

Political offices
Preceded by Elio Di Rupo	Minister-President of Wallonia; 2007–2014	Succeeded by Paul Magnette
Preceded by Marie Arena	Minister-President of the French Community; 2008–2019	Succeeded by Pierre-Yves Jeholet
