= Parliament of the French Community =

Legislature of the French Community of Belgium

Coordinates: 50.8467°N 4.3621°E

Parliament of the French Community Parlement de la Communauté française

Type
- Type: Unicameral

Leadership
- President: Benoît Dispa, LE since July 15th 2024

Structure
- Seats: 94
- Political groups: Government (50): MR (31); LE (19); Opposition (44): PS (24); PTB (12); Ecolo (7); lib.res (1)
- Length of term: 5 years

Elections
- Last election: 9 June 2024
- Next election: 2029

Meeting place
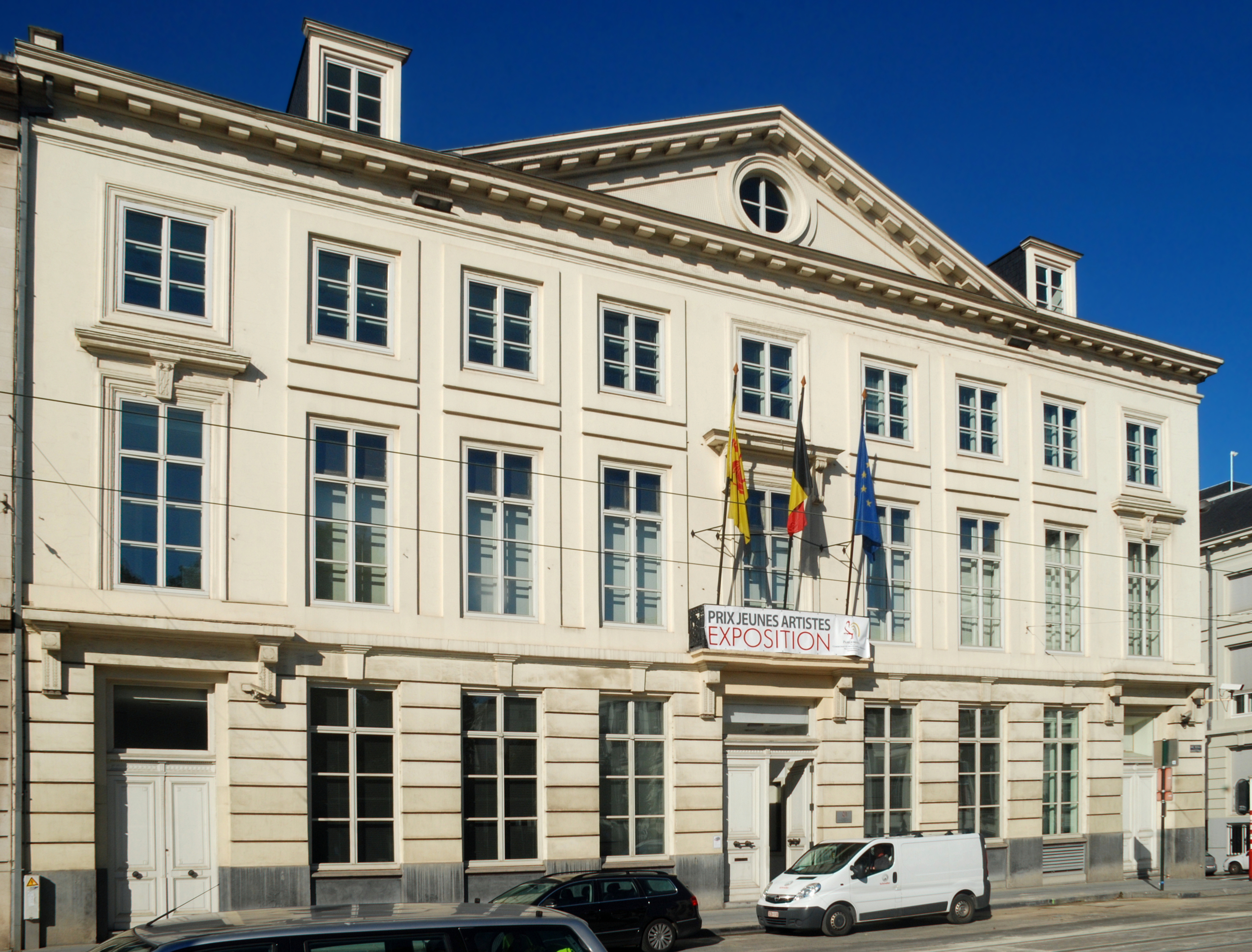
- Hôtel de Ligne, Brussels

Website
- http://www.pfwb.be/

The Parliament of the French Community (French: Parlement de la Communauté française [paʁləmɑ̃ d(ə) la kɔmynote fʁɑ̃sɛːz]; PCF) is the legislative assembly of the French Community of Belgium, located in the Royal Quarter of Brussels. It consists of all 75 members of the Parliament of Wallonia except German-speaking members (currently two) who are substituted by French-speaking members from the same party, and 19 members elected by the French linguistic group of the Parliament of the Brussels-Capital Region within the former body. These members are elected for a term of five years.

The current president of the Parliament of the French Community is Benoît Dispa (LE).

== Bureau ==
The Bureau of Parliament has been composed as follows:

- Chairman: Benoît Dispa (LE)
- 1st vice-president: Caroline Cassart-Mailleux (MR)
- 2nd vice-president: Özlem Özen (PS)
- 3rd vice-president: Anne Laffut (MR)
- Secretary: Sabine Roberty (PS)
- Secretary: Bruno Bauwens (PTB)
- Secretary: Stéphanie Cortisse (MR)

== Compositions ==
=== 2024–2029 ===
Affiliation	Waloons			Brussels			Total		
Affiliation	2024 election	current	+/−	2024 election	current	+/−	2024 election	current	+/−
Reformist Movement (MR)	26	26	Steady	5	5	Steady	31	31	Steady
Socialist Party (PS)	19	19	Steady	5	5	Steady	24	24	Steady
The Committed Ones (LE)	17	17	Steady	2	2	Steady	19	19	Steady
Workers' Party of Belgium (PTB)	8	8	Steady	4	4	Steady	12	12	Steady
Ecolo	5	5	Steady	2	2	Steady	7	7	Steady
Free and Responsible (lib.res)	–	–	–	–	1	▲1	–	1	▲1
Democratic Federalist Independent (DéFI)	0	0	Steady	1	0	▼1	1	0	▼1
Total	75	75	Steady	19	19	Steady	94	94	Steady

=== 2019–2024 ===
Affiliation	Waloons					Brussels	Total
Affiliation	Hain.	Liège	Lux.	Namur	Walloon Brabant	Brussels	Total
Socialist Party (PS)	11	7	1	3	1	5	28
Reformist Movement (MR)	5	6	2	3	4	3	23
Ecolo	3	4	1	2	2	4	16
Workers' Party of Belgium (PTB-GO!)	5	4	0	1	0	3	13
Humanist Democratic Centre (cdH)	3	2	2	2	1	1	11
Democratic Federalist Independent (DéFI)	0	0	0	0	0	3	3
Total	27	23	6	11	8	19	94

=== 2014–2019 ===

Affiliation	Waloons	Brussels	Total
Socialist Party (PS)	30	6	36
Reformist Movement (MR)	25	5	30
Humanist Democratic Centre (cdH)	13	3	16
Ecolo	4	2	6
Democratic Federalist Independent (DéFI)	0	3	3
Workers' Party of Belgium (PTB-GO!)	2	0	2
People's Party (PP)	1	0	1
Total	75	19	94

== See also ==
- Government of the French Community
- Minister-President of the French Community
- Parliament of Wallonia
- Flemish Parliament
- Parliament of the German-speaking Community
