= Élisabeth Degryse =

Belgian politician (born 1980)

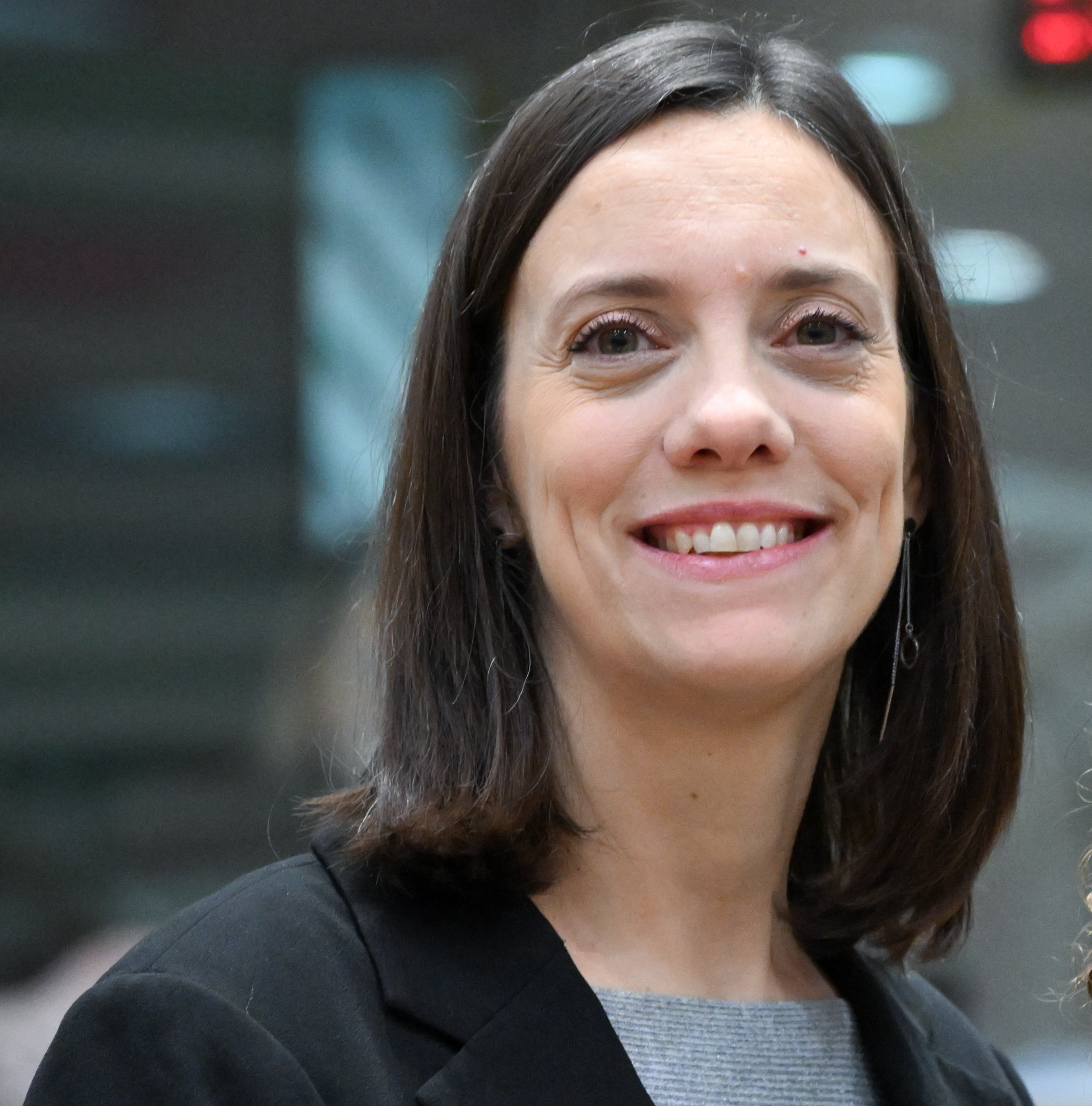
- Degryse in 2025.

Minister-President of the French Community
- Incumbent
- Assumed office 16 July 2024
- Preceded by: Pierre-Yves Jeholet

Member of the Belgian Chamber of Representatives
- In office 10 July 2024 – 18 July 2024
- Succeeded by: Ismaël Nuino

Personal details
- Born: 22 September 1980 (age 46) Uccle, Belgium
- Party: Les Engagés
- Education: UCLouvain

Élisabeth Degryse (born 22 September 1980) is a Belgian politician. A member of Les Engagés, she has been Minister-President of the French Community of Belgium since 16 July 2024, also responsible for the Budget, Higher Education, Culture and International and Intra-Francophone Relations. She was also a federal deputy in July 2024.

== Early life and education ==
Degryse is the eldest of five children in a Brussels family. Her father was first a teacher then a politician and her mother, a social nurse and nursery director. She studied humanities at the Institut Saint-André, in Ixelles, then she studied history and began a degree in political science at the Catholic University of Louvain. After her studies, she became involved in a non-governmental organization in India.

== Career ==
Back in Belgium, Degryse worked in the department of the alderman for cleanliness for the city of Brussels. She then followed the PSC MP Denis Grimberghs. She participated in the organization of the 2009 elections and then became deputy chief of staff to the Deputy Prime Minister Joëlle Milquet. Degryse joined the Mutualité Chrétienne in 20113 and became deputy director of the structures managing supplementary and optional insurance. In 2013, she became director of the Saint-Michel mutuality (in Brussels). At the beginning of 2015, she became national secretary of the Alliance of Christian Mutualities. In July 2020, she became the first woman to take on the role of vice-president of this organization.

=== Political career ===
Degryse ran in the federal elections of June 2024 representing the party Les Engagés as head of the list with Pierre Kompany in second position in the constituency of Brussels. She was elected on 9 June 2024 with 11,483 preferential votes. She took the oath on 10 July before the House of Representatives but she was appointed Minister-President of the French Community a few days later and took the oath before the King on 16 July. She was replaced in the House by her substitute, Ismaël Nuino.

== Personal life ==
Degryse is married and has four children.

Political offices
Preceded by Pierre-Yves Jeholet	Minister-President of the French Community; 2024–present	Succeeded by Incumbent
