= Pierre-Yves Jeholet =

Belgian politician (born 1968)

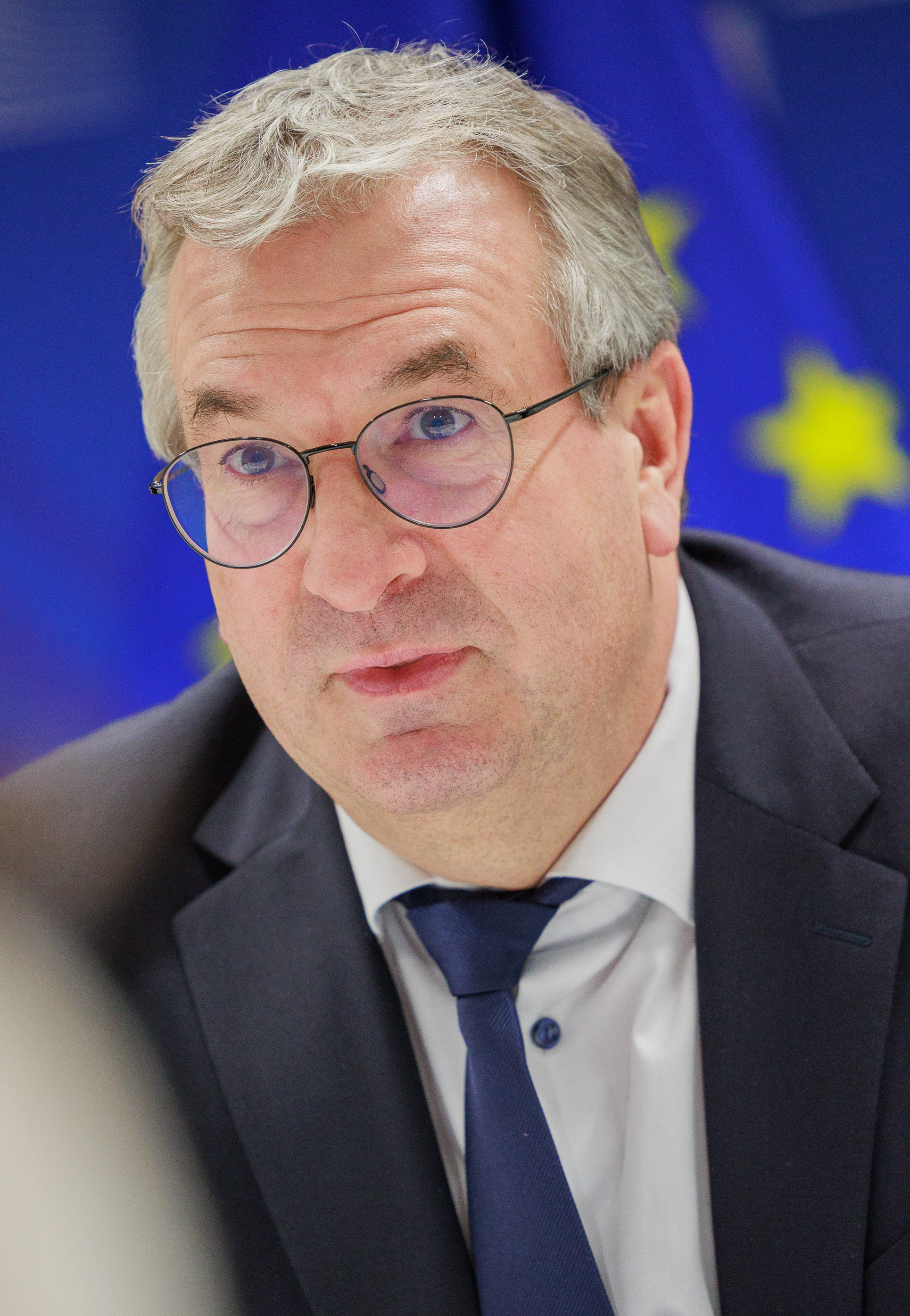
- Jeholet in 2023

Minister-President of the French Community
- In office 13 September 2019 – 15 July 2024
- Preceded by: Rudy Demotte
- Succeeded by: Élisabeth Degryse

Personal details
- Born: 6 October 1968 (age 57)
- Party: Reformist Movement

Pierre-Yves Jeholet (born 6 October 1968) is a Belgian politician of the Reformist Movement. Since 2024, he has served as vice president of the government of Wallonia and as minister of economy and employment. From 2019 to 2024, he served as minister-president of the French Community. He served as group leader of the Reformist Movement in the Parliament of Wallonia from 2014 to 2017, and as minister of economy from 2017 to 2019.
