= Les Engagés =

French-speaking political party in Belgium

- Abbreviation: LE
- President: Yvan Verougstraete (acting)
- Founded: 17 March 2022; 4 years ago
- Preceded by: Humanist Democratic Centre
- Headquarters: National secretariat Rue du Commerce, 123, Brussels
- Think tank: Centre d'études politiques économiques et sociales
- Ideology: Social liberalism
- Political position: Centre
- European affiliation: European Democratic Party
- European Parliament group: Renew Europe
- Flemish counterpart: Christian Democratic and Flemish
- Colours: Turquoise
- Slogan: Pour une société régénérée ('For a regenerated society')
- Chamber of Representatives (French-speaking seats): 14 / 61
- Senate (French-speaking seats): 4 / 24
- Walloon Parliament: 17 / 75
- Parliament of the French Community: 19 / 94
- Brussels Parliament (French-speaking seats): 8 / 72
- European Parliament (French-speaking seats): 1 / 8

Website
- lesengages.be

Les Engagés (LE, [lez‿ɑ̃ɡaʒe], lit. 'The Committed Ones') is a centrist French-speaking political party in Belgium. The party originated in the split in 1972 of the unitary Christian Social Party (PSC-CVP), which had been the country's governing party for much of the post-war period. It continued to be called the Christian Social Party (French: Parti Social Chrétien, PSC) until 2002 when it was renamed the Humanist Democratic Centre (French: Centre Démocrate Humaniste, CDH). It took its current name on 17 March 2022, and currently is a member of the governing national coalition in Belgium, along with the Walloon and French Community coalition governments.

== History ==
The PSC was officially founded in 1972. The foundation was the result of the split of the unitary Christian Social Party (PSC-CVP) into the Dutch-speaking Christian People's Party (CVP) and the French-speaking Christian Social Party (PSC), following the increased linguistic tensions after the crisis at the Catholic University of Leuven in 1968. The PSC performed particularly badly in the 1999 general election. This was linked to several scandals, such as the escape of Marc Dutroux and the discovery of dioxins in chickens (the PSC was a coalition partner in the Dehaene government). The decline in votes was also explained by declining adherence to Catholicism. The party was confined to opposition on all levels of government.

The party started a process of internal reform. In 2001, a new charter of principles, the "Charter of Democratic Humanism," was adopted and in 2002 the party adopted a new constitution and a new name, Humanist Democratic Centre. On 17 March 2022, the party changed to its current name and political colors. On 10 October 2022, Virginie Lefrancq, a Brussels MP, announced that she was leaving Les Engagés, feeling politically orphaned.

After the 2024 European Parliament election in Belgium, Les Engagés sole elected MEP, Yvan Verougstraete, announced that he would sit with the Renew Europe group; the party subsequently withdrew from the European People's Party and joined the European Democratic Party. In the European Committee of the Regions, its members sit with the Renew Europe CoR Group.

== Ideology ==
The party considers itself to be a movement rather than a party, and calls for citizen-led initiatives and more engagement between the public and politicians. The party has dropped all its Christian references and now defines itself as a party working for the "common good"; it has subsequently withdrawn from the Christian Democratic European People's Party (EPP) and joined the centrist European Democratic Party (EDP).

On its manifesto, the party supports NATO, the EU, secularism and LGBT rights. Les Engagés supports intensifying awareness and information campaigns on gender and homosexuality, as well as the reimbursement of gynecological and andrological care for trans people.

=== Electoral positioning ===
During the 2019 election campaign, the RePresent research centre — composed of political scientists from five universities (UAntwerpen, KU Leuven, VUB, UCLouvain and ULB) — studied the electoral programmes of Belgium's thirteen main political parties. This study classified the parties on two "left-right" axes, from "-5" (extreme left) to "5" (extreme right): a "classic" socio-economic axis, which refers to state intervention in the economic process and the degree to which the state should ensure social equality, and a socio-cultural axis, which refers to a divide articulated around an identity-based opposition on themes such as immigration, Europe, crime, the environment, emancipation, etc.

The cdH then presented a rather centrist programme (−1.04) on the socio-economic level, and centre-left (−1.83) on the socio-cultural level.

The RePresent centre repeated the exercise during the 2024 election campaign for the twelve main parties. The party's positioning – renamed "Les Engagés" in 2022 – shifted towards the right, becoming the most centrist party of the Belgian political spectrum, both on the socio-economic axis (0.24) and on the socio-cultural axis (−0.77).

== International affiliation ==
In the European Committee of the Regions, Les Engagés sits in the Renew Europe Group, with two full and one alternate members for the 2025-2030 mandate. Olivier de Wasseige is the Deputy-Coordinator of the ECON Commission.

== Election results ==
=== Chamber of Representatives ===
Election	Leader	Votes	%	Seats	+/-	Government
2024	Maxime Prévot	472,755	6.77 (#8)	14 / 150	New	Coalition

=== Regional ===
==== Brussels Parliament ====
Election	Votes	%	Seats	+/-	Government
2024	41,640	10.7 (#4)	8 / 89	▲2	Coalition

==== Walloon Parliament ====
Election	Votes	%	Seats	+/-	Government
2024	427,479	20.7 (#3)	17 / 75	▲7	Coalition

=== European Parliament ===
Election	List leader	Votes	%		Seats	+/-	EP Group
Election	List leader	Votes	F.E.C.	Overall	Seats	+/-	EP Group
2024	Yvan Verougstraete	368,668	14.28 (#4)	5.17	1 / 22	0	RE

== Presidents ==
- 2022–present Maxime Prévot
