= Brussels (Chamber of Representatives constituency) =

Parliamentary constituency in Belgium

- Bruxelles; Brussel; Brüssel
- Constituency for the Chamber of Representatives
- Location of Brussels within Belgium
- Region: Brussels
- Population: 1,255,795 (2025)
- Electorate: 623,162 (2019)
- Area: 162 km^{2} (2024)

Current Constituency
- Created: 2014
- Seats: List: 16 (2024–present); 15 (2014–2024)
- Members: List: Khalil Aouasti (PS); Alexia Bertrand (Open Vld); Nabil Boukili (PTB); Ridouane Chahid (PS); Michel De Maegd (MR); Caroline Désir (PS); François De Smet (DéFI); Youssef Handichi (MR); Pierre Jadoul (MR); Pierre Kompany (LE); Rajae Maouane (Ecolo); Lydia Mutyebele Ngoi (PS); Ismaël Nuino (LE); Julien Ribaudo (PTB); Annik Van den Bosch (PVDA); Tinne Van der Straeten (Groen)
- Created from: Brussels-Halle-Vilvoorde

Brussels (French: Bruxelles; Dutch: Brussel; German: Brüssel) is one of the 11 multi-member constituencies of the Chamber of Representatives, the lower house of the Belgian Federal Parliament, the national legislature of Belgium. The constituency was established in 2014 following the Sixth Belgian state reform. It is conterminous with the region of Brussels. The constituency currently elects 16 of the 150 members of the Chamber of Representatives using the open party-list proportional representation electoral system. At the 2024 federal election the constituency had 647,386 registered electors.

== Electoral system ==
Brussels currently elects 16 of the 150 members of the Chamber of Representatives using the open party-list proportional representation electoral system. Seats are allocated using the D'Hondt method. Only parties that reach the 5% threshold in the constituency compete for seats.

Electors may vote for the list (party) or for individual candidates, either main candidates or substitute candidates or a combination, on the list. They may vote for as many candidates as there are seats in the constituency. Split-ticket voting (panachage) is not permitted and will result in the ballot paper being invalidated. The minimum number of votes a candidate must obtain to get elected - the quotient - is calculated as the total votes received by the party divided by the number of seats in the constituency plus one. Half the ballot papers where there are no votes for main candidates (i.e. the elector has voted for the list or for substitute candidates only) are redistributed amongst main candidates in the order they appear on the ballot paper so that the candidate's total votes (personal votes plus redistributed votes) equals the quotient. The seats won by the party are then allocated to the candidates with the most number of total votes.

== Election results ==
=== Summary ===
Election	Workers PTB/PVDA			Ecolo Ecolo-Groen			Socialists PS-Vooruit / PS-SP.A / PS			Democratic Federalists DéFI / FDF			Liberals & Democrats Open Vld			Reformists MR-Open Vld / MR			Les Engagés LE-CD&V / CDH			New Flemish N-VA			Vlaams Belang VB		
Election	Votes	%	Seats	Votes	%	Seats	Votes	%	Seats	Votes	%	Seats	Votes	%	Seats	Votes	%	Seats	Votes	%	Seats	Votes	%	Seats	Votes	%	Seats
2024	86,927	16.75%	3	58,645	11.30%	2	96,516	18.60%	4	34,143	6.58%	1				120,155	23.15%	4	49,425	9.52%	2	14,472	2.79%	0	12,754	2.46%	0
2019	61,589	12.28%	2	108,144	21.57%	4	100,195	19.98%	3	51,544	10.28%	2	11,511	2.30%	0	87,594	17.47%	3	29,161	5.82%	1	15,983	3.19%	0	7,824	1.56%	0
2014	19,135	3.84%	0	52,133	10.45%	2	123,985	24.86%	5	55,306	11.09%	2	13,283	2.66%	0	115,038	23.07%	4	46,441	9.31%	2	13,223	2.65%	0	5,157	1.03%	0

(Figures in italics represent alliances.)

=== Detailed ===
==== 2024 ====
Results of the 2024 federal election held on 9 June 2024:

Party		Votes per canton										Total votes	%	Seats
Party		Ander- lecht	Brus- sels	Ixelles	Molen- beek- Saint- Jean	Saint- Gilles	Saint- Josse- ten- Noode	Schaer- beek	Uccle	Expat- riates	Sint- Gene- sius- Rode	Total votes	%	Seats
Reformist Movement and Open Flemish Liberals and Democrats	MR-Open Vld	10,227	11,527	15,561	13,266	2,068	20,377	11,160	18,579	6,469	10,921	120,155	23.15%	4
Socialist Party and Vooruit	PS-Vooruit	12,538	15,362	8,856	18,029	3,467	9,096	14,716	9,290	3,005	2,157	96,516	18.60%	4
Workers' Party of Belgium	PTB/PVDA	13,016	14,386	7,118	17,381	3,492	7,407	12,600	8,207	1,372	1,948	86,927	16.75%	3
Ecolo and Groen	Ecolo-Groen	3,855	6,824	9,367	6,247	2,902	7,793	7,609	7,898	4,568	1,582	58,645	11.30%	2
Les Engagés and Christian Democratic and Flemish	LE-CD&V	4,481	5,018	6,476	6,539	987	9,298	5,698	5,670	1,601	3,657	49,425	9.52%	2
DéFI	DéFI	2,344	2,889	5,977	3,607	726	6,230	4,008	4,774	1,103	2,485	34,143	6.58%	1
Team Fouad Ahidar	TFA	4,719	5,276	722	7,323	637	1,237	3,032	1,322	195	363	24,826	4.78%	0
New Flemish Alliance	N-VA	1,796	2,395	1,406	2,467	360	1,632	1,638	1,324	935	519	14,472	2.79%	0
Vlaams Belang	VB	1,984	1,757	939	2,513	282	1,238	1,545	1,036	1,010	450	12,754	2.46%	0
Citizen Collective	CC	579	761	940	746	204	995	785	903	257	409	6,579	1.27%	0
Blank Party	PB	368	364	412	570	59	443	430	379	115	147	3,287	0.63%	0
Volt Belgium	Volt	194	437	350	341	111	406	335	241	538	79	3,032	0.58%	0
Workers' Struggle	LO	227	210	212	243	79	207	240	198	208	48	1,872	0.36%	0
Agora	Agora	132	182	295	160	100	230	241	223	87	38	1,688	0.33%	0
Belgische Unie – Union Belge	BUB	168	216	129	211	32	158	173	119	214	184	1,604	0.31%	0
For You	PV	247	277	99	321	44	154	171	92	96	33	1,534	0.30%	0
The United		156	153	189	177	40	194	163	157	139	99	1,467	0.28%	0
Valid votes		57,031	68,034	59,048	80,141	15,590	67,095	64,544	60,412	21,912	25,119	518,926	100.00%	16
Rejected votes		4,337	4,915	2,657	6,059	902	3,589	4,875	2,879	1,375		31,588	5.74%	
Total polled		61,368	72,949	61,705	86,200	16,492	70,684	69,419	63,291	23,287		550,514	85.04%	
Registered electors		74,866	88,835	71,899	104,407	19,672	82,345	83,389	74,815	47,158		647,386		
Turnout		81.97%	82.12%	85.82%	82.56%	83.83%	85.84%	83.25%	84.60%	49.38%		85.04%		

The following candidates were elected: Alexia Bertrand (Open Vld), 20,528 votes; Nabil Boukili (PTB), 29,627 votes; Ridouane Chahid (PS), 18,001 votes; Philippe Close (PS), 12,610 votes; Élisabeth Degryse (LE), 11,483 votes; Michel De Maegd (MR), 17,946 votes; Caroline Désir (PS), 20,924 votes; François De Smet (DéFI), 8,741 votes; Valérie Glatigny (MR), 25,021 votes; Youssef Handichi (MR), 3,280 votes; Pierre Kompany (LE), 7,872 votes; Rajae Maouane (Ecolo), 10,556 votes; Lydia Mutyebele Ngoi (PS), 7,871 votes; Julien Ribaudo (PTB), 6,318 votes; Annik Van den Bosch (PVDA), 9,937 votes; and Tinne Van der Straeten (Groen), 11,666 votes.

Substitutions:

- Philippe Close (PS) resigned and was substituted by Khalil Aouasti (PS) on 4 July 2024.
- Élisabeth Degryse (LE) was appointed to the Government of the French Community and was substituted by Ismaël Nuino (LE) from 18 July 2024.
- Valérie Glatigny (MR) was appointed to the Government of the French Community and was substituted by Pierre Jadoul (MR) from 18 July 2024.

==== 2019 ====
Results of the 2019 federal election held on 26 May 2019:

Party		Votes per canton										Total votes	%	Seats
Party		Ander- lecht	Brus- sels	Ixelles	Molen- beek- Saint- Jean	Saint- Gilles	Saint- Josse- ten- Noode	Schaer- beek	Uccle	Expat- riates	Sint- Gene- sius- Rode	Total votes	%	Seats
Ecolo and Groen	Ecolo-Groen	8,853	12,186	16,999	12,569	4,617	14,063	13,565	14,517	6,854	3,921	108,144	21.57%	4
Socialist Party and Socialist Party Different	PS-SP.A	13,796	16,273	7,317	21,334	3,568	9,358	16,111	8,263	1,970	2,205	100,195	19.98%	3
Reformist Movement	MR	7,422	6,904	11,786	9,496	1,396	14,948	6,898	13,829	6,046	8,869	87,594	17.47%	3
Workers' Party of Belgium	PTB/PVDA	9,667	10,320	4,859	12,384	2,951	4,484	9,462	5,493	746	1,223	61,589	12.28%	2
DéFI	DéFI	3,839	4,475	7,820	5,216	824	10,627	7,244	6,956	1,133	3,410	51,544	10.28%	2
Humanist Democratic Centre	CDH	2,987	3,854	2,629	5,749	549	4,926	3,439	2,635	960	1,433	29,161	5.82%	1
New Flemish Alliance	N-VA	2,403	2,561	1,405	3,285	337	1,746	1,825	1,320	672	429	15,983	3.19%	0
Destexhe List		1,196	1,170	1,618	1,674	231	2,116	1,283	2,048	480	1,063	12,879	2.57%	0
Open Flemish Liberals and Democrats	Open Vld	1,133	1,961	1,192	2,130	276	1,590	1,343	927	677	282	11,511	2.30%	0
People's Party	PP	1,149	1,025	884	1,413	224	931	1,076	862	524	367	8,455	1.69%	0
Vlaams Belang	VB	1,524	1,130	482	1,799	157	674	963	491	429	175	7,824	1.56%	0
Christian Democratic and Flemish	CD&V	855	1,128	530	1,203	118	915	844	416	370	201	6,580	1.31%	0
Valid votes		54,824	62,987	57,521	78,252	15,248	66,378	64,053	57,757	20,861	23,578	501,459	100.00%	15
Rejected votes		5,419	5,565	3,079	7,324	1,242	3,709	5,770	3,383	1,159		36,650	6.81%	
Total polled		60,243	68,552	60,600	85,576	16,490	70,087	69,823	61,140	22,020		538,109	86.35%	
Registered electors		72,760	83,931	71,888	103,141	19,841	81,992	84,072	73,017	32,520		623,162		
Turnout		82.80%	81.68%	84.30%	82.97%	83.11%	85.48%	83.05%	83.73%	67.71%		86.35%		

The following candidates were elected: Nabil Boukili (PTB), 13,790 votes; Georges Dallemagne (CDH), 8,766 votes; Séverine de Laveleye (Ecolo), 8,175 votes; Michel De Maegd (MR), 7,998 votes; Caroline Désir (PS), 11,421 votes; François De Smet (DéFI), 10,000 votes; Zakia Khattabi (Ecolo), 29,157 votes; Emir Kir (PS), 18,520 votes; Ahmed Laaouej (PS), 31,589 votes; Didier Reynders (MR), 33,205 votes; Sophie Rohonyi (DéFI), 5,704 votes; Gilles Vanden Burre (Ecolo), 8,696 votes; Tinne Van der Straeten (Groen), 10,938 votes; Maria Vindevoghel (PVDA), 14,642 votes; and Sophie Wilmès (MR), 16,180 votes.

Substitutions:

- Caroline Désir (PS) was appointed to the Government of the French Community and was substituted by Khalil Aouasti (PS) from 19 September 2019.
- Didier Reynders (MR) resigned on 30 November 2019 and was substituted by Philippe Pivin (MR) on the same day.
- Zakia Khattabi (Ecolo) was appointed to the federal government and was substituted by Claire Hugon (Ecolo) on 1 October 2020.
- Tinne Van der Straeten (Groen) was appointed to the federal government and was substituted by Guillaume Defossé (Ecolo) on 1 October 2020.

==== 2014 ====
Results of the 2014 federal election held on 25 May 2014:

Party		Votes per canton										Total votes	%	Seats
Party		Ander- lecht	Brus- sels	Ixelles	Molen- beek- Saint- Jean	Saint- Gilles	Saint- Josse- ten- Noode	Schaer- beek	Uccle	Expat- riates	Sint- Gene- sius- Rode	Total votes	%	Seats
Socialist Party	PS	16,286	18,461	10,757	22,827	5,109	12,332	20,357	12,076	2,834	2,946	123,985	24.86%	5
Reformist Movement	MR	10,746	9,846	14,865	15,690	2,127	18,093	10,615	19,330	4,284	9,442	115,038	23.07%	4
Francophone Democratic Federalists	FDF	3,709	4,304	9,657	5,446	780	12,655	6,878	6,587	1,098	4,192	55,306	11.09%	2
Ecolo and Groen	Ecolo-Groen	4,135	5,947	8,871	6,060	2,726	6,819	6,926	6,885	2,135	1,629	52,133	10.45%	2
Humanist Democratic Centre	CDH	5,405	6,746	3,827	8,314	1,094	7,265	6,403	4,521	794	2,072	46,441	9.31%	2
Workers' Party of Belgium	PTB/PVDA	1,856	2,626	2,527	3,352	1,240	1,788	3,105	2,139	183	319	19,135	3.84%	0
Open Flemish Liberals and Democrats	Open Vld	1,620	2,132	1,219	2,618	296	1,606	1,623	1,093	594	482	13,283	2.66%	0
New Flemish Alliance	N-VA	2,204	2,116	1,032	2,696	265	1,310	1,406	1,006	336	852	13,223	2.65%	0
Debout Les Belges!		1,726	1,756	856	2,303	478	1,004	1,598	984	166	241	11,112	2.23%	0
Socialist Party Different	SP.A	1,496	1,826	661	2,618	317	735	1,137	486	136	201	9,613	1.93%	0
Islam		1,724	1,674	426	2,128	363	650	1,634	603	79	106	9,387	1.88%	0
People's Party	PP	1,346	1,104	912	1,595	167	976	1,194	870	208	269	8,641	1.73%	0
Christian Democratic and Flemish	CD&V	1,276	1,284	760	1,587	131	1,120	949	548	203	315	8,173	1.64%	0
Vlaams Belang	VB	1,044	753	307	1,108	111	457	668	401	175	133	5,157	1.03%	0
The Right		355	228	260	382	50	234	241	223	128	64	2,165	0.43%	0
Nation		242	132	109	249	39	148	395	167	96	46	1,623	0.33%	0
Left Communists		147	139	231	163	175	129	218	179	40	24	1,445	0.29%	0
Egalitarians!		114	187	52	190	35	82	204	53	23	13	953	0.19%	0
Libertarian Party		74	75	118	92	33	100	107	80	49	22	750	0.15%	0
Left Movement	MG	66	54	76	95	22	55	97	70	22	10	567	0.11%	0
Agora Erasmus		50	41	47	50	13	48	60	37	29	7	382	0.08%	0
The Fight		29	17	26	41	7	17	32	20	18	6	213	0.04%	0
Valid votes		55,650	61,448	57,596	79,604	15,578	67,623	65,847	58,358	13,630	23,391	498,725	100.00%	15
Rejected votes		4,329	4,556	2,403	5,771	1,042	2,761	4,446	2,665	1,084		29,057	5.51%	
Total polled		59,979	66,004	59,999	85,375	16,620	70,384	70,293	61,023	14,714		527,782	86.72%	
Registered electors		71,769	80,934	71,391	102,535	19,786	83,363	83,357	72,733	22,709		608,577		
Turnout		83.57%	81.55%	84.04%	83.26%	84.00%	84.43%	84.33%	83.90%	64.79%		86.72%		

The following candidates were elected: Nawal Ben Hamou (PS), 6,880 votes; Véronique Caprasse (FDF), 4,869 votes; Francis Delpérée (CDH), 13,543 votes; Céline Fremault (CDH), 7,362 votes; Benoit Hellings (Ecolo), 3,725 votes; Zakia Khattabi (Ecolo), 9,285 votes; Emir Kir (PS), 18,536 votes; Ahmed Laaouej (PS), 12,996 votes; Karine Lalieux (PS), 10,963 votes; Olivier Maingain (FDF), 32,246 votes; Laurette Onkelinx (PS), 41,621 votes; Philippe Pivin (MR), 5,945 votes; Didier Reynders (MR), 54,475 votes; Françoise Schepmans (MR), 13,564 votes; and Damien Thiéry (MR), 7,599 votes.

Substitutions:

- Céline Fremault (CDH) was appointed to the federal government and was substituted by Georges Dallemagne (CDH) on 30 July 2014.
- Zakia Khattabi (Ecolo) resigned on 25 May 2015 and was substituted by Gilles Vanden Burre (Ecolo) on 28 May 2015.
- Didier Reynders (MR) was appointed to the federal government and was substituted by Gautier Calomne (MR) on 13 October 2015.
