= Gilles Vanden Burre =

Belgian politician (born 1978)

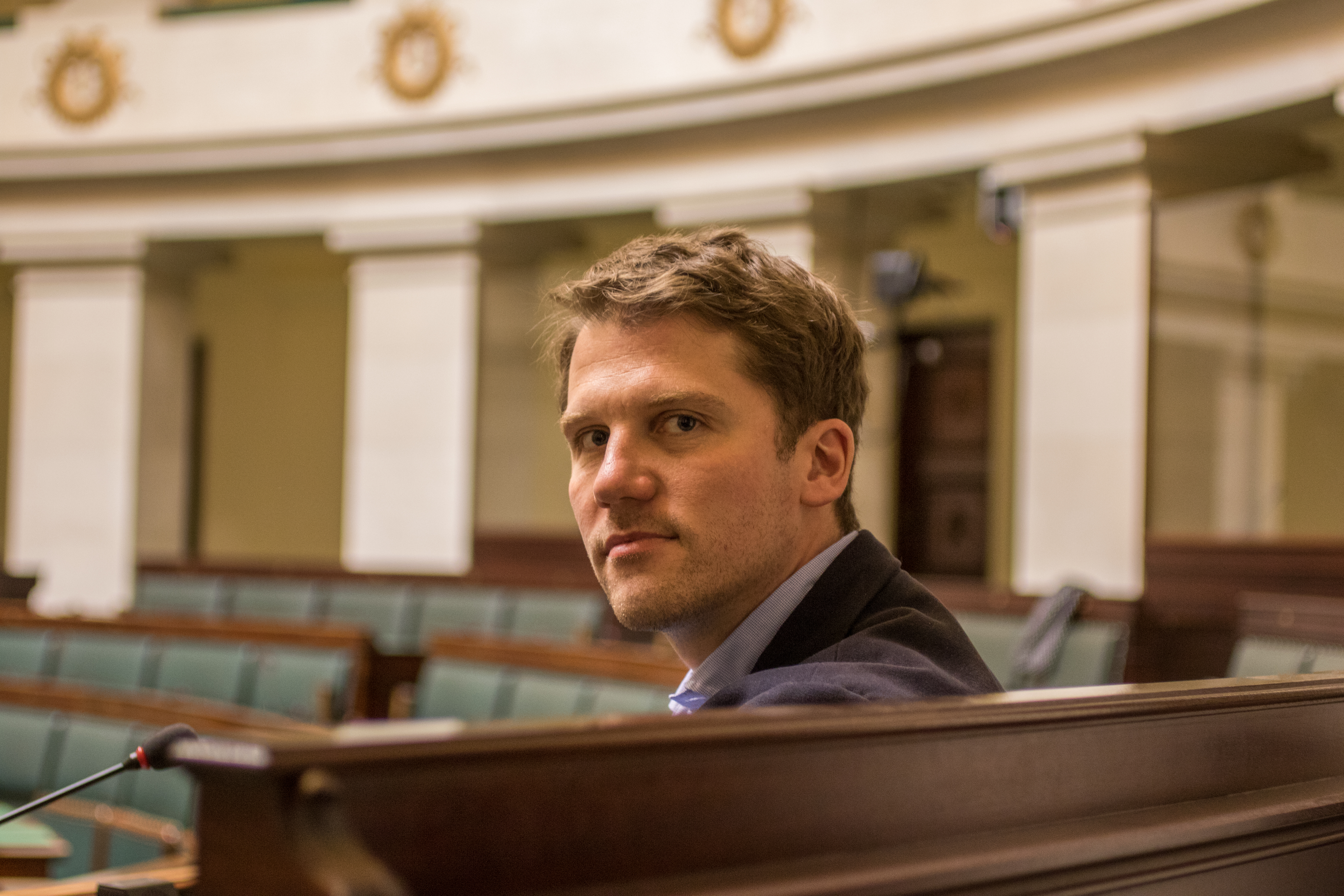
- Vanden Burre in 2017

Co-Leader of Ecolo
- Incumbent
- Assumed office 15 March 2026 Serving with Samuel Cogolati
- Preceded by: Marie Lecocq

Member of the Chamber of Representatives
- In office 28 May 2015 – 8 May 2024
- Preceded by: Zakia Khattabi
- Constituency: Brussels

Personal details
- Born: 11 January 1978 (age 48)
- Party: Ecolo

Gilles Vanden Burre (born 11 January 1978) is a Belgian politician serving as co-leader of Ecolo since 2026. From 2015 to 2024, he was a member of the Chamber of Representatives.
