= 2019 Belgian regional elections =

Map of results by constituency, province, or canton

The 2019 Belgian regional elections took place on Sunday 26 May, the same day as the 2019 European Parliament election as well as the Belgian federal election.

In the regional elections, new representatives were chosen for the Flemish Parliament, Walloon Parliament, Brussels Parliament and the Parliament of the German-speaking Community. The Parliament of the French Community was composed of all elected members of the Walloon Parliament (except German-speaking members) and 19 of the French-speaking members of the Brussels Parliament.

The elections followed the 2014 elections and were shortly after the 2018 local elections, which indicated voters' tendencies after an unusually long period of time without any elections in Belgium.

== Electoral system ==
The regional parliaments have limited power over their own election; federal law largely regulates this and the federal government organises the elections, which occur per Article 117 of the Constitution on the same day as the European Parliament elections.

As such, all regional parliaments were elected using proportional representation under the D'Hondt method. Only Belgian citizens in Belgium had the right to vote, and voting was mandatory for them. Belgians living abroad were allowed to vote in European and federal elections, but not in regional elections.

The following timetable is fixed for the simultaneous European, federal and regional elections:

| 26 January 2019 | Start of the "waiting period" (sperperiode) running until the day of the election, during which political propaganda and expenses are strictly regulated |
| 1 March 2019 | The electoral roll is fixed by municipal authorities |
| 11 May 2019 | Final day for the official announcement of the election and the convocation letter to voters |
| 26 May 2019 | Polling day (from 8am until 2pm, or until 4pm where voting is done electronically) |

== Flemish Parliament ==
2019 Flemish parliamentary election
- 26 May 2019

All 124 seats in the Flemish Parliament 63 seats needed for a majority
- Turnout: 92.2%
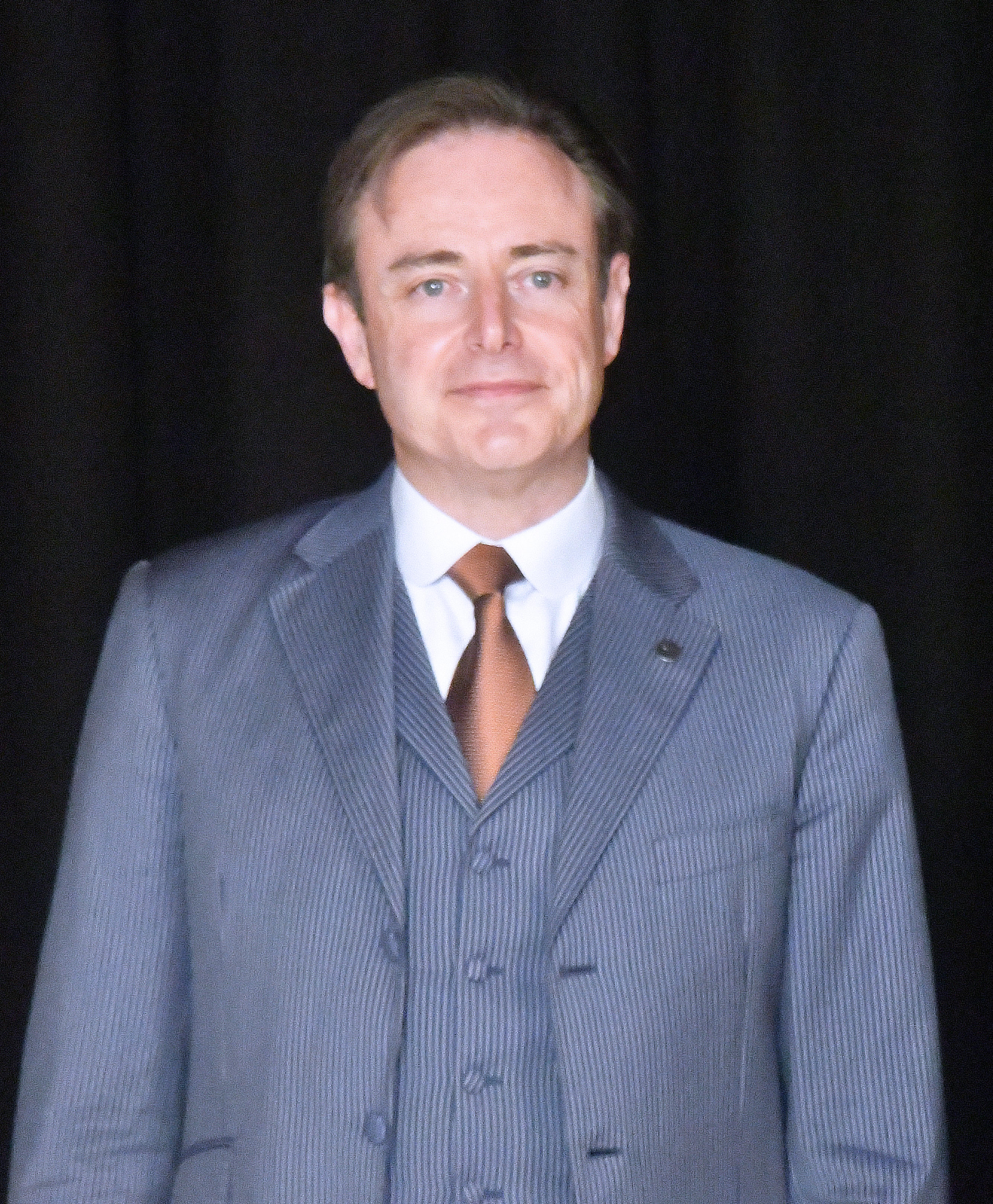

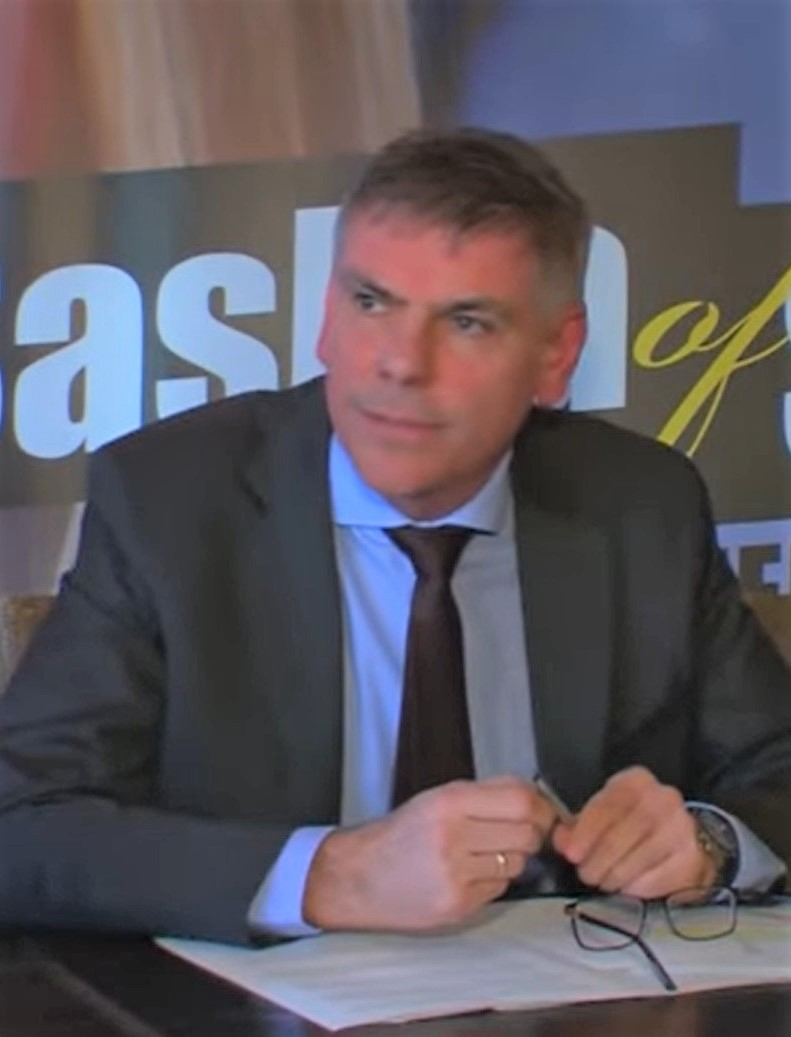

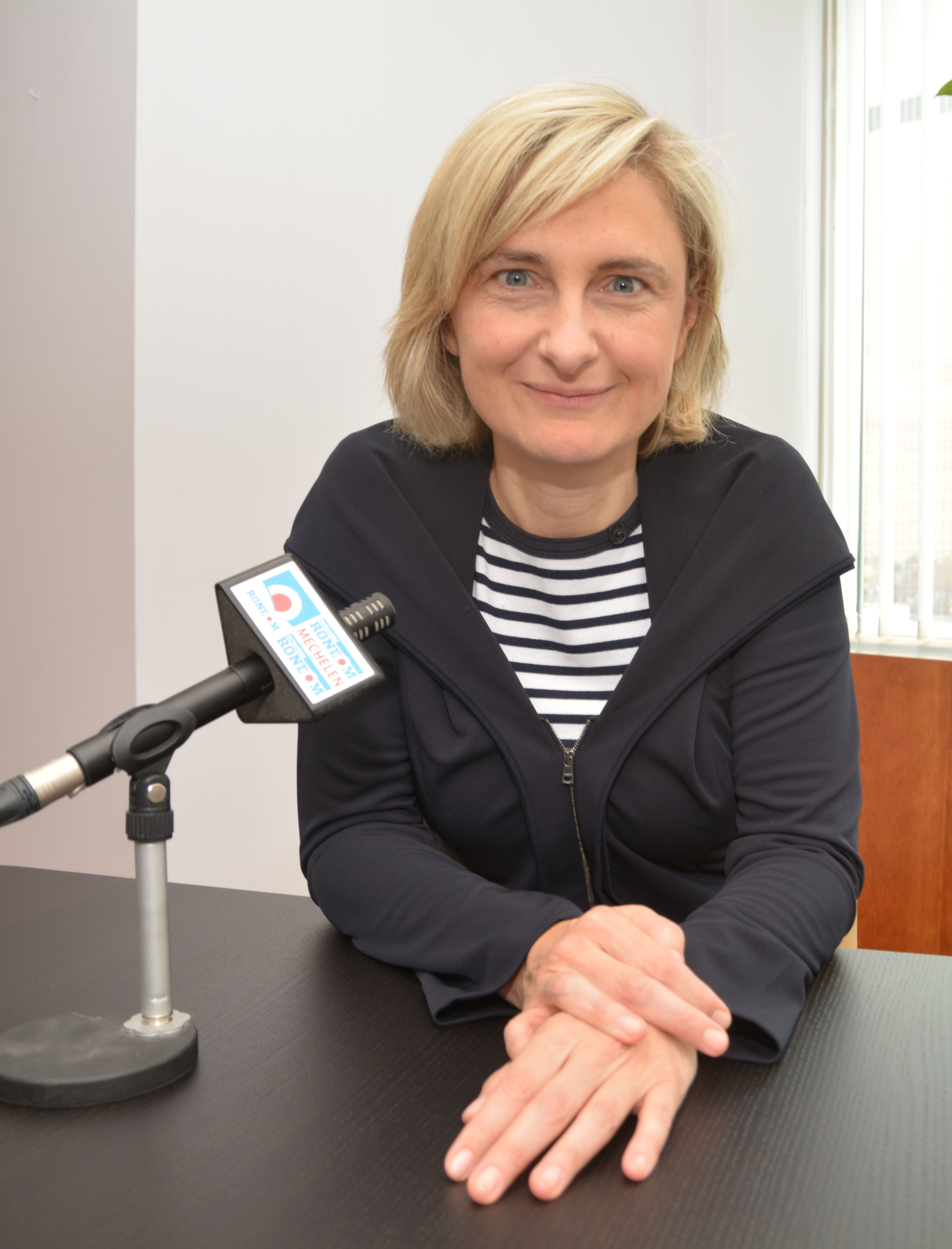
| | First party | Second party | Third party |
|---|---|---|---|
| Leader | Bart De Wever | Filip Dewinter | Hilde Crevits |
| Party | N-VA | Flemish Interest | CD&V |
| Leader's seat | Antwerp | Antwerp | West Flanders |
| Last election | 43 seats, 31.9% | 6 seats, 5.9% | 27 seats, 20.5% |
| Seats won | 35 | 23 | 19 |
| Seat change | ▼8 | ▲17 | ▼8 |
| Popular vote | 1,052,252 | 783,977 | 652,766 |
| Percentage | 24.8% | 18.5% | 15.4% |
| Swing | ▼7.1 pp | ▲12.6 pp | ▼5.1 pp |
| | Fourth party | Fifth party | Sixth party |
| Party | Open Vld | sp.a | Groen |
| Last election | 19 seats, 14.2% | 18 seats, 14.0% | 10 seats, 8.7% |
| Seats won | 16 | 13 | 14 |
| Seat change | ▼3 | ▼5 | ▲4 |
| Popular vote | 556,630 | 438,589 | 428,696 |
| Percentage | 13.1% | 10.3% | 10.1% |
| Swing | ▼1.1 pp | ▼3.7 pp | ▲1.4 pp |
Flemish Government before election
Bourgeois Government
N-VA–CD&V–Open Vld coalition
Elected Flemish Government
Jambon Government
N-VA-CD&V-Open Vld coalition

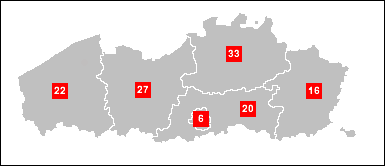
Number of seats per constituency in Flanders

124 members of the Flemish Parliament were elected. The five Flemish provinces (West Flanders, East Flanders, Antwerp, Flemish Brabant and Limburg) each were a constituency, plus the Brussels-Capital Region where those voting for a Dutch-language party could also vote in the Flemish election.

The incumbent Bourgeois Government was made up of a coalition of Flemish nationalists (N-VA), Christian democrats (CD&V) and liberals (Open Vld). The incumbent Minister-President was Geert Bourgeois (N-VA). The three-party centre-right government coalition had a comfortable majority.

In the October 2018 local elections, no major shifts occurred, although N-VA and sp.a lost some support while Vlaams Belang and Groen generally gained votes. CD&V and Open Vld remained stable.

Incumbent Minister-President Bourgois (N-VA) contended in the simultaneous European Parliament elections; N-VA president Bart De Wever (N-VA) was their party's candidate to succeed him as head of the Flemish Government. Minister Hilde Crevits was CD&V's candidate for Minister-President. Open Vld explicitly did not put forward a candidate.

Parties in the Flemish Parliament
| Political party | Party leader | 2014 seats | Current seats |
|---|---|---|---|
| New Flemish Alliance (N-VA) | Bart De Wever (since 2004) | 43 (government) | 35 (government) |
| Christian Democratic and Flemish (CD&V) | Wouter Beke (since 2010) | 27 (government) | 19 (government) |
| Open Flemish Liberals and Democrats (Open Vld) | Gwendolyn Rutten (since 2012) | 19 (government) | 16 (government) |
| Socialist Party Different (sp.a) | John Crombez (since 2015) | 18 (opposition) | 13 (opposition) |
| Green (Groen) | Meyrem Almaci (since 2014) | 10 (opposition) | 14 (opposition) |
| Flemish Interest (Vlaams Belang) | Tom Van Grieken (since 2014) | 6 (opposition) | 23 (opposition) |
| Union des Francophones (UF) | | 1 (opposition) | 0 |
| Workers' Party of Belgium (PVDA) | | 0 | 4 (opposition) |
| Independents | | N/A | 0 |

=== Main candidates ===
The following candidates are the first on the respective party list (lijsttrekker) per constituency.

| Party | Antwerp | East Flanders | Flemish Brabant | Limburg | West Flanders | Brussels |
|---|---|---|---|---|---|---|
| CD&V | Koen Van den Heuvel | Joke Schauvliege | Peter Van Rompuy | Lode Ceyssens | Hilde Crevits | Benjamin Dalle |
| Groen | Meyrem Almaci | Bjorn Rzoska | An Moerenhout | Johan Daenen | Jeremie Vaneeckhout | Stijn Bex |
| N-VA | Bart De Wever | Matthias Diependaele | Ben Weyts | Steven Vandeput | Bert Maertens | Karl Vanlouwe |
| Open Vld | Bart Somers | Carina Van Cauter | Gwendolyn Rutten | Lydia Peeters | Bart Tommelein | Else Ampe |
| PVDA | Jos D'Haese | Tom De Meester | Sander Vandecapelle | Kim De Witte | Natalie Eggermont | Nele Vandenbempt |
| sp.a | Caroline Gennez | Conner Rousseau | Bruno Tobback | Els Robeyns | Annick Lambrecht | Bert Anciaux |
| Vlaams Belang | Filip Dewinter | Guy D'haeseleer | Klaas Slootmans | Chris Janssens (politician) | Stefaan Sintobin | Frédéric Erens |

=== Retiring incumbents ===
- Minister Jo Vandeurzen (CD&V, Limburg)
- Rob Beenders (sp.a, Limburg)
- Yamila Idrissi (sp.a, Brussels)
- Grete Remen (N-VA, Limburg)
- Johan Verstreken (CD&V, West Flanders)

=== Results ===
← Summary of the results of the 26 May 2019 Belgian election to the Flemish Parliament
| Party | Votes | % | +/– | Seats | +/– |
|---|---|---|---|---|---|
| New Flemish Alliance | 1,052,252 | 24.83 | −7.06 | 35 | −8 |
| Flemish Interest | 783,977 | 18.50 | +12.58 | 23 | +17 |
| Christian Democratic and Flemish | 652,766 | 15.40 | −5.08 | 19 | −8 |
| Open Flemish Liberals and Democrats | 556,630 | 13.13 | −1.01 | 16 | −3 |
| Socialist Party Differently (Note: Including one seat from a join sp.a–one list in Brussels) | 438,589 | 10.35 | −3.64 | 13 | −5 |
| Groen | 428,696 | 10.11 | +1.41 | 14 | +4 |
| Workers' Party of Belgium | 225,593 | 5.32 | +2.80 | 4 | +4 |
| DierAnimal | 36,944 | 0.87 | New | 0 | New |
| Union des Francophones | 28,804 | 0.68 | −0.15 | 0 | –1 |
| Pirate Party | 9,148 | 0.22 | −0.40 | 0 | ±0 |
| PRO | 5,685 | 0.13 | New | 0 | New |
| D-SA | 4,569 | 0.11 | New | 0 | New |
| Be.One | 4,064 | 0.10 | New | 0 | New |
| PV&S | 2,813 | 0.07 | New | 0 | New |
| Genoeg vr iedereen | 2,650 | 0.06 | New | 0 | New |
| Burgerlijst | 2,033 | 0.05 | New | 0 | New |
| RP | 1,659 | 0.04 | New | 0 | New |
| De Coöperatie | 1,402 | 0.03 | New | 0 | New |
| Total | 4,238,274 | 100.00 | – | 124 | – |
| Valid votes | 4,238,274 | 95.05 | | | |
| Invalid/blank votes | 220,790 | 4.95 | | | |
| Total votes | 4,459,064 | 100.00 | | | |
| Registered voters/turnout | 4,838,566 | 92.16 | | | |
Source: IBZ

==== Distribution by province ====
| Province | N-VA | | VB | | CD&V | | Open VLD | | sp.a | | Groen | | PVDA | |
| Province | % | S | % | S | % | S | % | S | % | S | % | S | % | S |
|---|---|---|---|---|---|---|---|---|---|---|---|---|---|---|
| Antwerp | 31.82 | 12 | 18.46 | 6 | 11.43 | 4 | 10.21 | 3 | 7.93 | 2 | 11.18 | 4 | 6.68 | 2 |
| East Flanders | 22.24 | 6 | 20.64 | 6 | 13.48 | 4 | 15.85 | 4 | 10.27 | 3 | 10.52 | 3 | 5.52 | 1 |
| Flemish Brabant | 25.78 | 6 | 13.26 | 3 | 13.04 | 3 | 15.61 | 3 | 9.50 | 2 | 12.22 | 3 | 4.61 | 0 |
| Limburg | 22.03 | 4 | 20.15 | 3 | 19.20 | 3 | 11.89 | 2 | 13.54 | 2 | 6.71 | 1 | 5.71 | 1 |
| West Flanders | 19.67 | 5 | 20.21 | 5 | 23.47 | 5 | 12.34 | 3 | 12.18 | 3 | 7.08 | 1 | 3.43 | 0 |
| Brussels | 18.96 | 2 | 8.49 | 0 | 8.42 | 0 | 16.33 | 1 | 13.38 | 1 | 28.03 | 2 | 6.38 | 0 |
| Total | 24.83 | 35 | 18.50 | 23 | 15.40 | 19 | 13.13 | 16 | 10.35 | 12 | 10.11 | 14 | 5.32 | 4 |
Source: Federal Public Services Home Affairs

== Walloon Parliament ==
2019 Walloon parliamentary election
- 26 May 2019

All 75 seats in the Walloon Parliament 38 seats needed for a majority
- Turnout: 93.4%
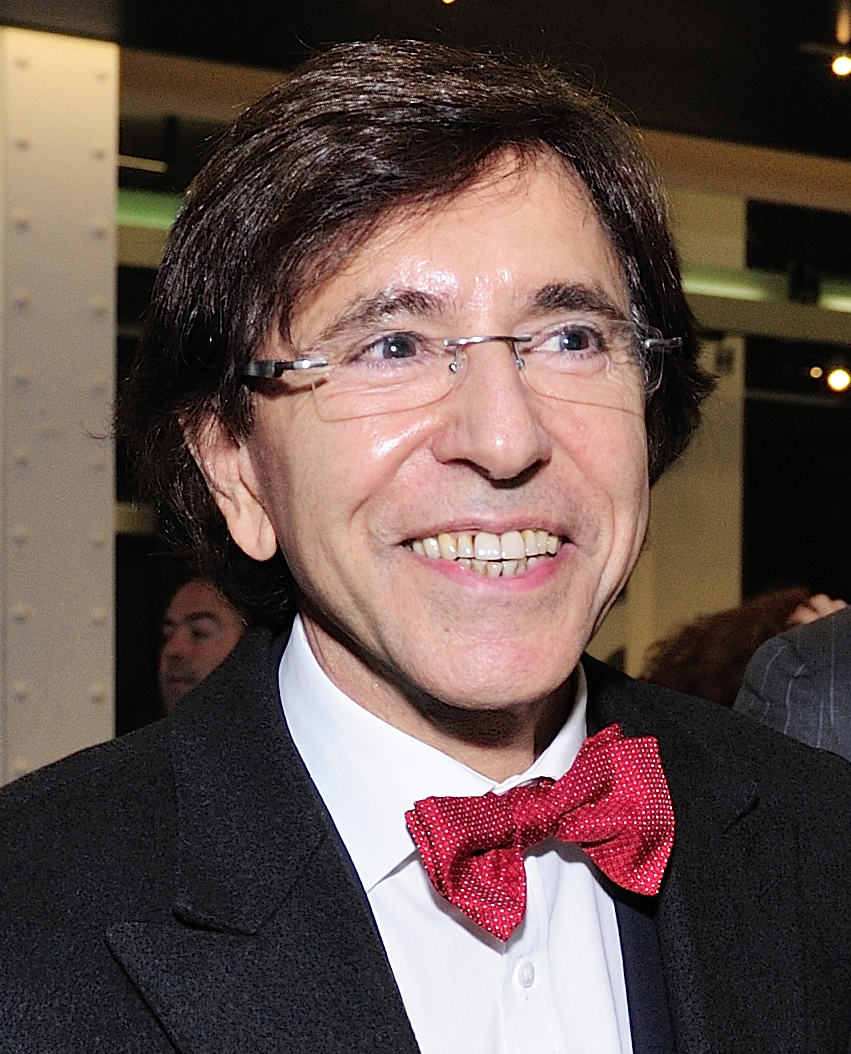

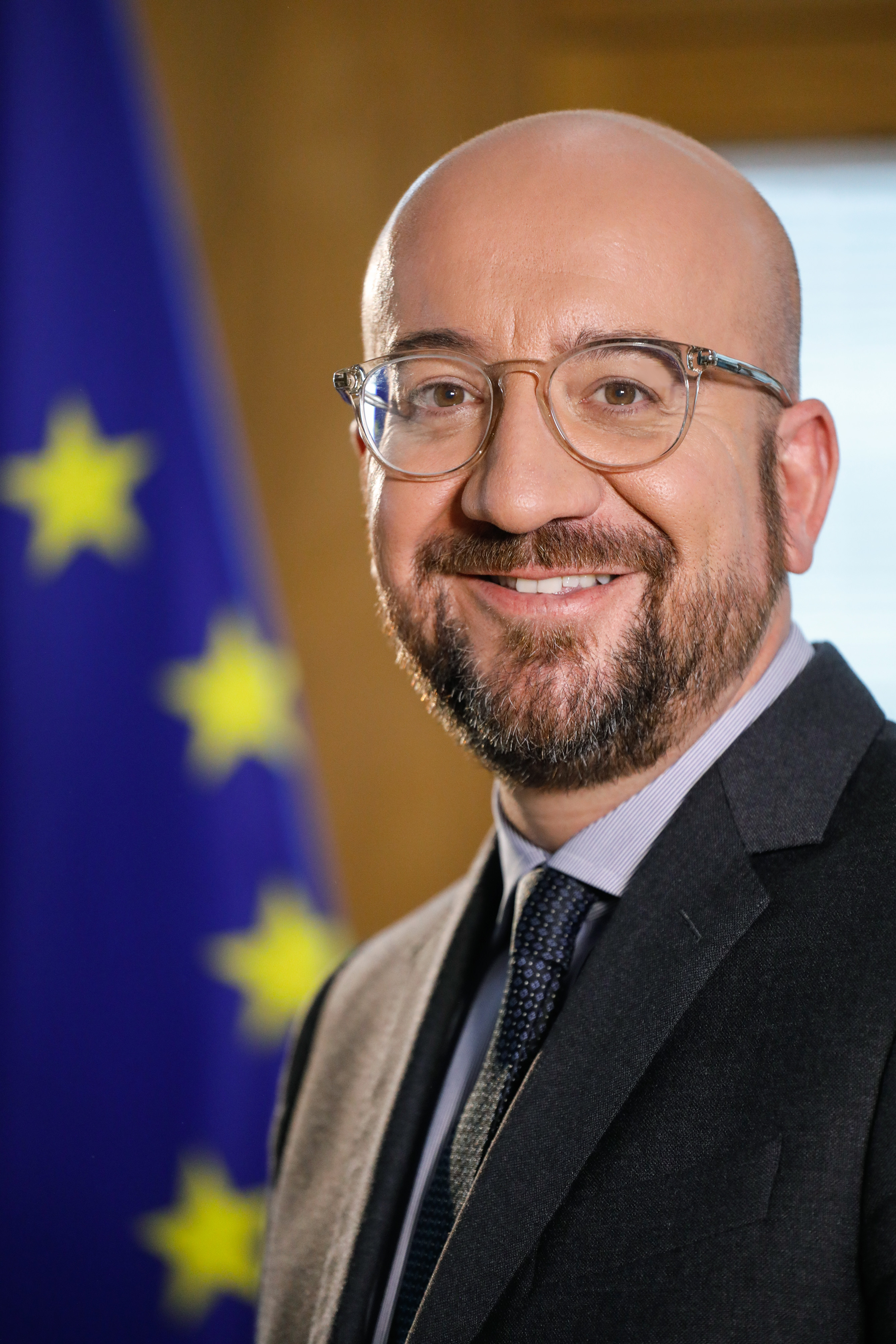

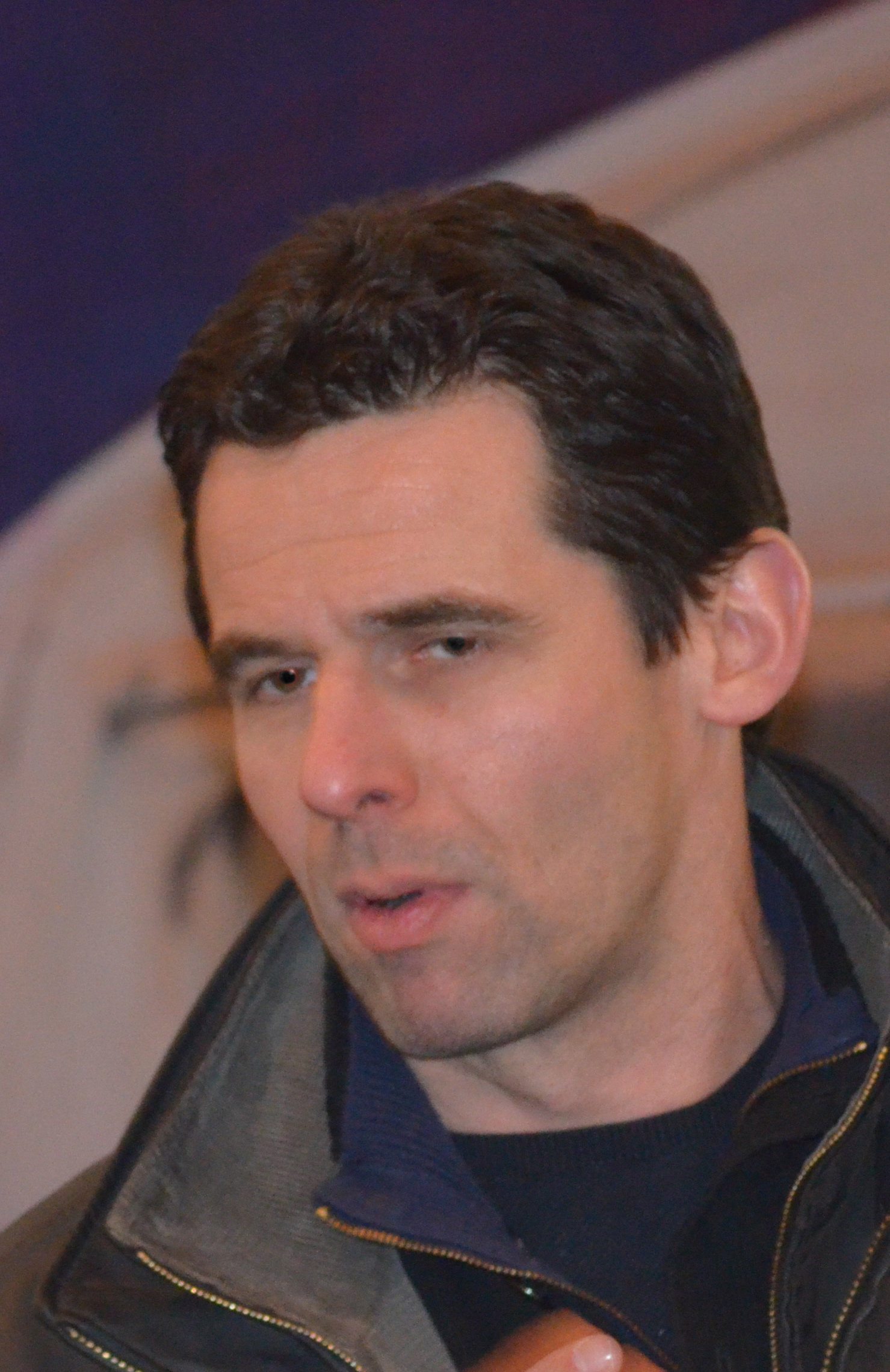

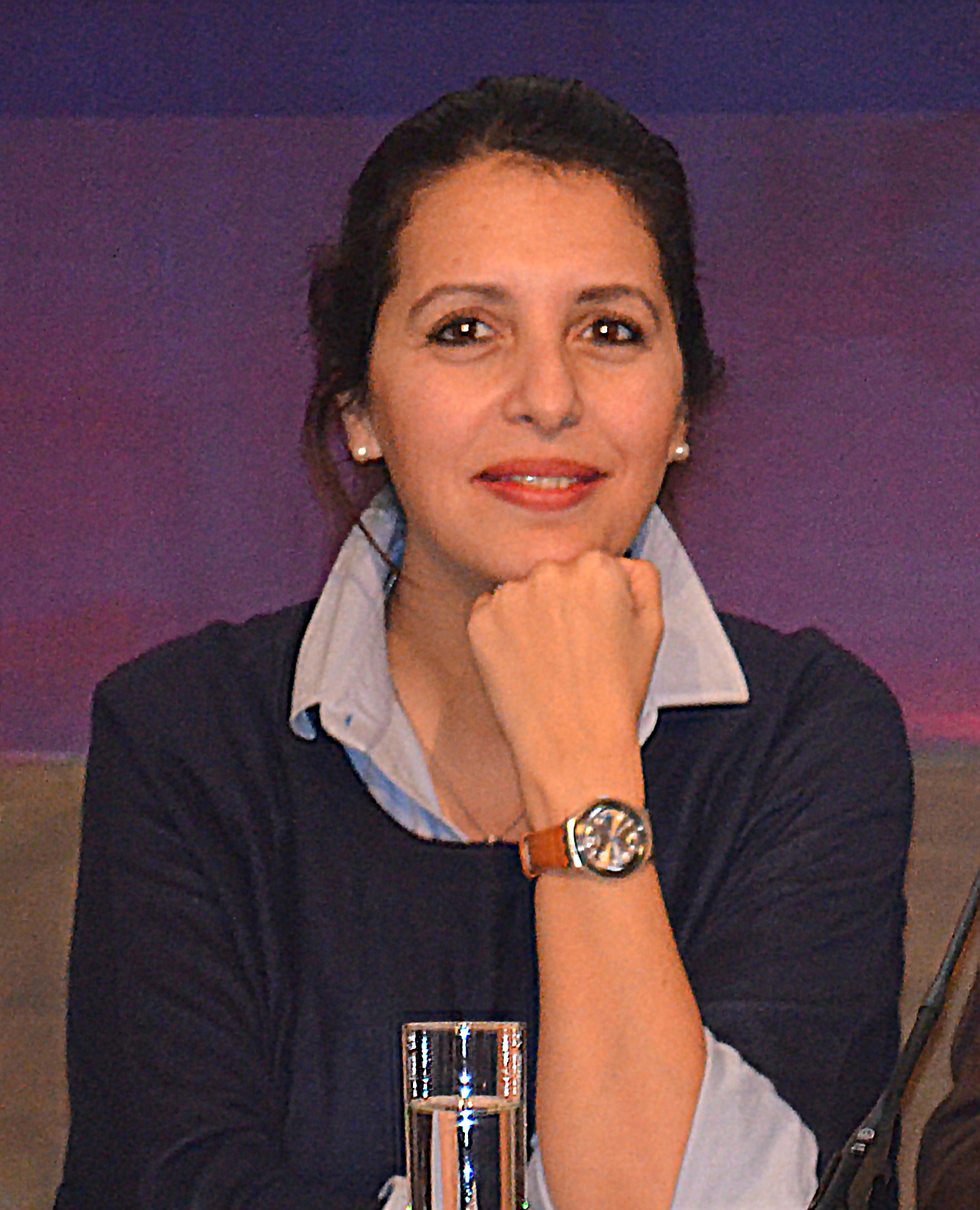

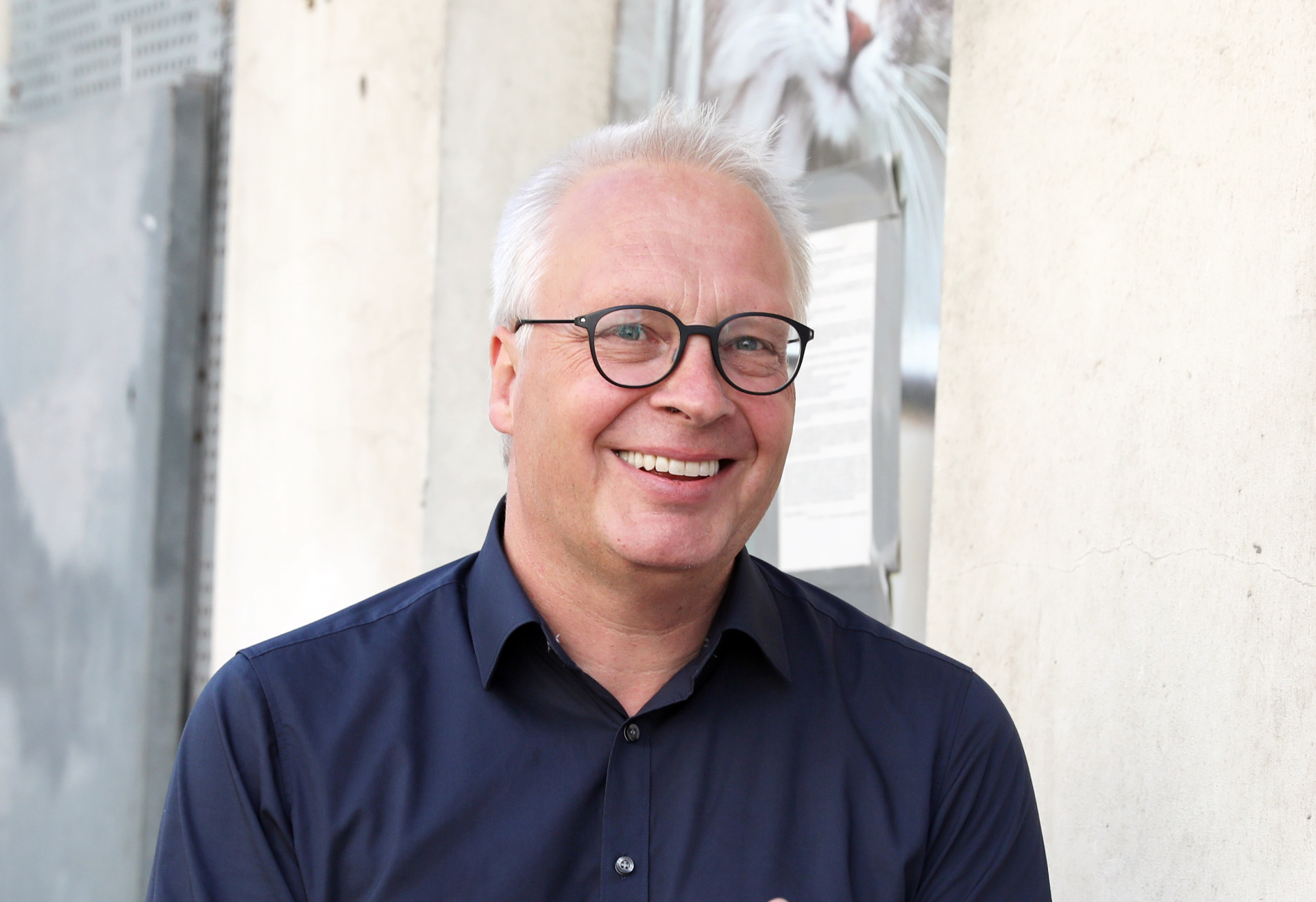

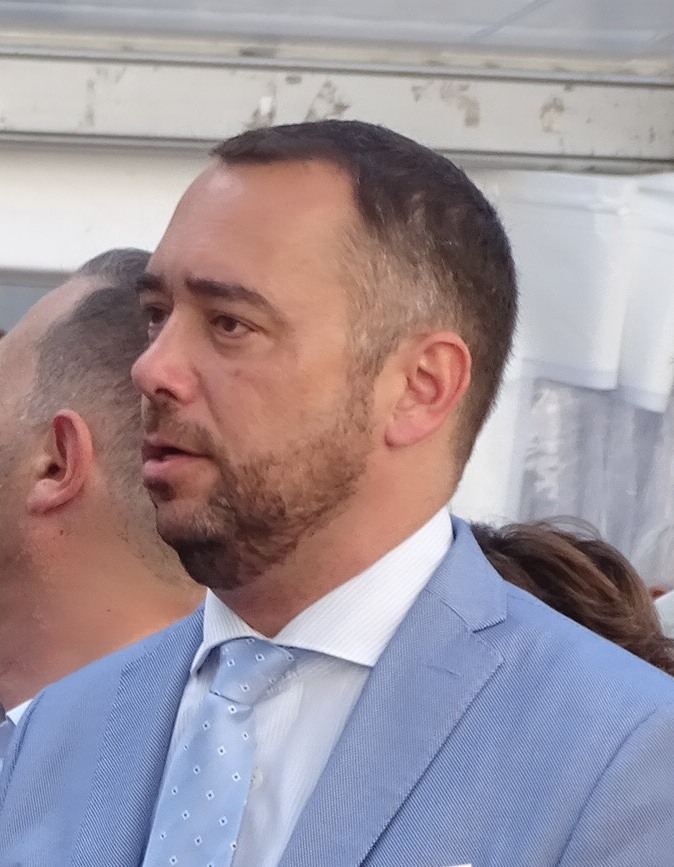
| | First party | Second party | Third party |
|---|---|---|---|
| Leader | Elio Di Rupo | Charles Michel | Jean-Marc Nollet; Zakia Khattabi |
| Party | PS | MR | Ecolo |
| Last election | 30 seats, 30.9% | 25 seats, 26.7% | 4 seats, 8.6% |
| Seats won | 23 | 20 | 12 |
| Seat change | ▼7 | ▼5 | ▲8 |
| Popular vote | 532,422 | 435,878 | 294,631 |
| Percentage | 26.2% | 21.4% | 14.5% |
| Swing | ▼4.7 pp | ▼5.3 pp | ▲5.9 pp |
| | Fourth party | Fifth party |
| Leader | Peter Mertens | Maxime Prévot |
| Party | PVDA-PTB | cdH |
| Last election | 2 seats, 5.8% | 13 seats, 15.2% |
| Seats won | 10 | 10 |
| Seat change | ▲8 | ▼3 |
| Popular vote | 278,343 | 223,775 |
| Percentage | 13.7% | 11.0% |
| Swing | ▲7.9 pp | ▼4.2 pp |
Walloon Government before election
Borsus Government
MR–cdH coalition
Elected Walloon Government
Di Rupo III Government
PS–MR–Ecolo coalition

75 members of the Walloon Parliament were elected. The members were elected in multi-member arrondissement-based constituencies; the Walloon Parliament is the only parliament in Belgium still using this geographical level for constituencies. A January 2018 law however reduced the constituencies from 13 to 11, following a successful challenge by Ecolo to the Constitutional Court that constituencies with too few seats are unrepresentative. Both Luxembourg constituencies were merged and the Hainaut constituencies were redrawn.

After the 2014 elections, a coalition government of the Socialist Party (PS) and Christian democrats (cdH) was formed. In 2017 however, following major scandals involving mainly PS, cdH opted to continue governing with MR as the main party instead of PS. Willy Borsus (MR) succeeded Paul Magnette (PS) as Minister-President of Wallonia in July 2017. This was the first time a government majority changed during a legislative term of a Belgian regional government.

Parties in the Walloon Parliament
| Political party | Party leader | 2014 seats | Current seats |
|---|---|---|---|
| Socialist Party (PS) | Elio Di Rupo (since 1999) | 30 (government) | 30 (opposition) |
| Reformist Movement (MR) | Charles Michel (since 2019) | 25 (opposition) | 25 (government) |
| Humanist Democratic Centre (cdH) | Maxime Prévot (since 2019) | 13 (government) | 13 (government) |
| Ecolo (Ecolo) | Zakia Khattabi & Patrick Dupriez (since 2015) | 4 (opposition) | 4 (opposition) |
| Workers' Party (PVDA-PTB) | Peter Mertens (since 2008) | 2 (opposition) | 2 (opposition) |
| People's Party (Parti Populaire) | Mischaël Modrikamen (since 2009) | 1 (opposition) | N/A |
| Independents | | N/A | 1 (opposition) |

=== Results ===
← Summary of the results of the 26 May 2019 Walloon regional election
| Party | Votes | % | +/– | Seats | +/– |
|---|---|---|---|---|---|
| Socialist Party | 532,422 | 26.17 | −4.73 | 23 | −7 |
| Reformist Movement | 435,878 | 21.42 | −5.26 | 20 | −5 |
| Ecolo | 294,631 | 14.48 | +5.86 | 12 | +8 |
| Workers' Party of Belgium | 278,343 | 13.68 | +7.92 | 10 | +8 |
| Humanist Democratic Centre | 223,775 | 11.00 | −4.17 | 10 | −3 |
| Democratic, Federalist, Independent | 84,219 | 4.14 | +1.61 | 0 | ±0 |
| People's Party | 74,622 | 3.67 | +1.20 | 0 | −1 |
| Destexhe Lists | 30,878 | 1.52 | New | 0 | New |
| Citizen Collective | 26,673 | 1.31 | New | 0 | New |
| DierAnimal | 18,417 | 0.91 | −1.22 | 0 | ±0 |
| Nation | 9,649 | 0.47 | −0.06 | 0 | ±0 |
| Wallonie Unbowed | 8,155 | 0.40 | New | 0 | New |
| ACT | 7,146 | 0.35 | New | 0 | New |
| Tomorrow | 3,407 | 0.17 | −1.22 | 0 | ±0 |
| The Right | 4,443 | 0.22 | −1.22 | 0 | ±0 |
| Communist Party of Belgium | 944 | 0.05 | New | 0 | New |
| Referendum | 621 | 0.03 | −0.06 | 0 | ±0 |
| Turquoise | 590 | 0.03 | New | 0 | New |
| Total | 2,034,813 | 100.00 | – | 75 | – |
| Valid votes | 2,034,813 | 91.64 | | | |
| Invalid/blank votes | 185,630 | 8.36 | | | |
| Total votes | 2,220,443 | 100.00 | | | |
| Registered voters/turnout | 2,563,033 | 86.63 | | | |
Source: IBZ

==== Distribution by province ====
| Province | PS | | MR | | Ecolo | | PTB | | cdH | |
| Province | % | S | % | S | % | S | % | S | % | S |
|---|---|---|---|---|---|---|---|---|---|---|
| Hainaut | 33.23 | 11 | 16.97 | 5 | 11.64 | 3 | 15.96 | 5 | 8.78 | 3 |
| Liège | 25.47 | 7 | 20.41 | 6 | 15.45 | 4 | 15.34 | 4 | 9.34 | 2 |
| Luxembourg | 19.58 | 1 | 25.27 | 2 | 14.74 | 1 | 9.05 | 0 | 22.51 | 2 |
| Namur | 23.21 | 3 | 21.97 | 3 | 14.98 | 2 | 12.30 | 1 | 15.40 | 2 |
| Walloon Brabant | 14.92 | 1 | 34.04 | 4 | 19.76 | 2 | 7.53 | 0 | 8.43 | 1 |
| Total | 26.17 | 23 | 21.42 | 20 | 14.48 | 12 | 13.68 | 10 | 11.00 | 10 |
Source: Federal Public Services Home Affairs

== Brussels Parliament ==
All 89 members of the Parliament of the Brussels-Capital Region were elected. They were elected at-large, but there were separate Dutch-language party lists (electing 17 members) and French-language party lists (electing 72 members). Those voting for a Dutch-language party could also cast a vote for the Flemish Parliament election.

=== Results ===
| Party | Votes | % | Seats | +/– |
French language group
| Socialist Party | 85,530 | 22.03 | 17 | -4 |
| Ecolo | 74,246 | 19.12 | 15 | +7 |
| Reformist Movement | 65,502 | 16.87 | 13 | -5 |
| Francophone Democratic Federalists | 53,638 | 13.81 | 10 | -2 |
| Workers' Party of Belgium | 52,297 | 13.47 | 10 | +4 |
| Humanist Democratic Centre | 29,436 | 7.58 | 6 | -3 |
| Destexhe Lists | 10,052 | 2.59 | – | – |
| People's Party | 6,605 | 1.70 | – | – |
| DierAnimal | 5,113 | 1.32 | 1 | +1 |
| Citizen Collective | 2,029 | 0.52 | – | – |
| act-SALEM | 1,496 | 0.39 | – | – |
| Plan B | 1,115 | 0.29 | – | – |
| Hé | 697 | 0.18 | – | – |
| be@eu | 522 | 0.13 | – | – |
| Total | 388,278 | 100.00 | 72 | – |
Dutch language group
| Green | 14,425 | 20.61 | 4 | +1 |
| New Flemish Alliance | 12,578 | 17.97 | 3 | – |
| Open Flemish Liberals and Democrats | 11,051 | 15.79 | 3 | -2 |
| one.brussels-sp.a | 10,540 | 15.06 | 3 | – |
| Flemish Interest | 5,838 | 8.34 | 1 | – |
| Christian Democratic and Flemish | 5,231 | 7.47 | 1 | -1 |
| Agora | 3,629 | 5.18 | 1 | +1 |
| Be.One | 3,021 | 4.32 | – | – |
| Workers' Party of Belgium | 2,992 | 4.27 | 1 | +1 |
| DierAnimal | 691 | 0.99 | – | – |
| Total | 69,996 | 100.00 | 17 | – |
| Valid votes | 451,570 | 93.26 | | |
| Invalid/blank votes | 32,643 | 6.74 | | |
| Total votes | 484,213 | 100.00 | | |
| Registered voters/turnout | 588,203 | 82.32 | | |
Source: IBZ

==== Distribution by district ====
French language group
| District | PS | | Ecolo | | MR | | DéFI | | PTB | | cdH | | DierAnimal | |
| District | % | S | % | S | % | S | % | S | % | S | % | S | % | S |
| Anderlecht | 32.00 | | 15.29 | | 15.55 | | 8.81 | | 19.02 | | 7.00 | | 1.34 | |
| Brussels | 29.00 | | 16.46 | | 12.33 | | 9.59 | | 17.36 | | 8.32 | | 1.17 | |
| Ixelles | 13.24 | | 27.15 | | 20.38 | | 18.27 | | 8.35 | | 5.50 | | 1.46 | |
| Molenbeek-Saint-Jean | 28.42 | | 14.25 | | 14.13 | | 8.71 | | 17.00 | | 10.26 | | 1.24 | |
| Saint-Gilles | 25.20 | | 27.72 | | 9.65 | | 6.89 | | 19.79 | | 4.67 | | 1.28 | |
| Saint-Josse-ten-Noode | 14.34 | | 18.81 | | 22.78 | | 21.19 | | 6.94 | | 8.96 | | 1.20 | |
| Schaerbeek | 26.09 | | 18.13 | | 10.81 | | 16.45 | | 15.11 | | 7.08 | | 1.14 | |
| Uccle | 14.96 | | 22.72 | | 24.13 | | 15.13 | | 9.27 | | 5.75 | | 1.72 | |
| Total | 22.03 | 17 | 19.12 | 15 | 16.87 | 13 | 13.81 | 10 | 13.47 | 10 | 7.58 | 6 | 1.32 | 1 |
Source: Federal Public Services Home Affairs

Dutch language group
| District | Groen | | N-VA | | Open VLD | | sp.a | | VB | | CD&V | | Agora | | PVDA | |
| District | % | S | % | S | % | S | % | S | % | S | % | S | % | S | % | S |
| Anderlecht | 12.45 | | 22.30 | | 13.83 | | 16.18 | | 13.52 | | 8.15 | | 2.10 | | 4.36 | |
| Brussels | 21.91 | | 17.05 | | 14.29 | | 17.63 | | 7.52 | | 7.96 | | 2.91 | | 4.79 | |
| Ixelles | 27.16 | | 15.52 | | 17.27 | | 12.35 | | 5.22 | | 6.03 | | 9.74 | | 3.30 | |
| Molenbeek-Saint-Jean | 16.17 | | 19.99 | | 15.14 | | 17.85 | | 10.61 | | 7.95 | | 2.03 | | 4.19 | |
| Saint-Gilles | 28.69 | | 11.27 | | 10.72 | | 19.16 | | 4.53 | | 3.60 | | 9.56 | | 6.47 | |
| Saint-Josse-ten-Noode | 22.18 | | 17.36 | | 21.53 | | 9.99 | | 6.27 | | 9.20 | | 7.43 | | 0.97 | |
| Schaerbeek | 23.09 | | 16.22 | | 14.71 | | 13.15 | | 7.84 | | 6.91 | | 7.14 | | 5.65 | |
| Uccle | 23.27 | | 17.96 | | 17.48 | | 13.06 | | 5.90 | | 6.20 | | 8.40 | | 3.50 | |
| Total | 20.61 | 4 | 17.97 | 3 | 15.79 | 3 | 15.06 | 3 | 8.34 | 1 | 7.47 | 1 | 5.18 | 1 | 4.27 | 1 |
Source: Federal Public Services Home Affairs

== German-speaking Community Parliament ==
All 25 members of the Parliament of the German-speaking Community were elected in one constituency (at-large).

In the 2014–2019 period, the government was made up of regionalist ProDG, the socialist party and the liberal PFF, headed by Minister-President Oliver Paasch (ProDG).

Results by municipality

Parties in the German Parliament
| Political party | Members |
|---|---|
| Christian Social Party (CSP) | 7 (opposition) |
| ProDG | 6 (government) |
| Socialist Party (SP) | 4 (government) |
| Party for Freedom and Progress (PFF) | 4 (government) |
| Ecolo | 2 (opposition) |
| Vivant | 2 (opposition) |
| Total | 25 |

=== Results ===
| Party | Votes | % | +/– | Seats | +/– |
|---|---|---|---|---|---|
| ProDG | 9,146 | 23.33 | ▲1.13 | 6 | – |
| Christian Social Party | 9,069 | 23.14 | ▼1.72 | 6 | ▼1 |
| Socialist Party | 5,820 | 14.85 | ▼1.23 | 4 | – |
| Vivant | 5,807 | 14.81 | ▲4.20 | 3 | ▲1 |
| Ecolo | 4,902 | 12.51 | ▲2.96 | 3 | ▲1 |
| Party for Freedom and Progress | 4,454 | 11.36 | ▼4.18 | 3 | ▼1 |
| Total | 39,198 | 100.00 | – | 25 | – |
| Valid votes | 39,198 | 92.22 | | | |
| Invalid/blank votes | 3,305 | 7.78 | | | |
| Total votes | 42,503 | 100.00 | | | |
| Registered voters/turnout | 49,441 | 85.97 | | | |
Source: IBZ

==== Distribution by district ====
| District | ProDG | | CSP | | SP | | Vivant | | Ecolo | | PFF | |
| District | % | S | % | S | % | S | % | S | % | S | % | S |
|---|---|---|---|---|---|---|---|---|---|---|---|---|
| Eupen | 22.31 | | 24.32 | | 16.75 | | 9.09 | | 11.93 | | 12.27 | |
| St. Vith | 24.53 | | 21.75 | | 12.63 | | 21.49 | | 9.29 | | 10.30 | |
| Total | 23.33 | 6 | 23.14 | 6 | 14.85 | 4 | 14.81 | 3 | 12.51 | 3 | 11.36 | 3 |
Source: Federal Public Services Home Affairs
