= Tinne Van der Straeten =

Belgian politician (born 1978)

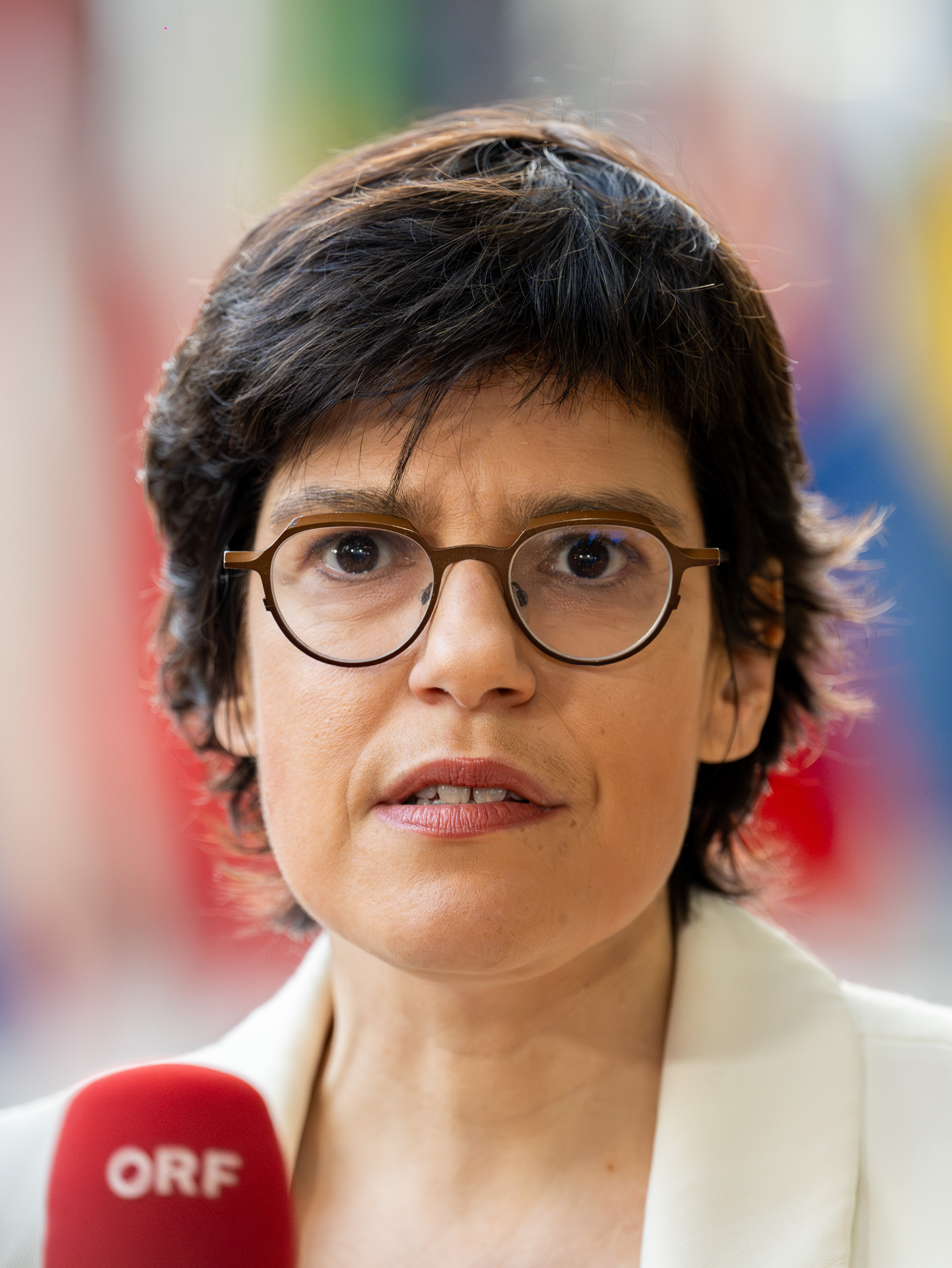
- Van der Straeten in 2024

Minister of Energy
- In office 1 October 2020 – 3 February 2025
- Monarch: Philippe
- Prime Minister: Alexander De Croo
- Preceded by: Marie-Christine Marghem
- Succeeded by: Mathieu Bihet

Member of the Chamber of Representatives
- In office 9 June 2024 – 2 February 2026
- In office 20 June 2019 – 1 October 2020
- Constituency: Brussels
- In office 28 June 2007 – 7 May 2010
- Constituency: Brussels-Halle-Vilvoorde

Personal details
- Born: 1 April 1978 (age 48) Zoersel, Belgium
- Party: Groen
- Education: Ghent University; Vrije Universiteit Brussel
- Occupation: Politician
- Website: Official website

Tinne Van der Straeten (born 1 April 1978) is a Belgian politician of the Groen party who served as Minister of Energy in the government of Prime Minister Alexander De Croo from October 2020 until February 2025.

Van der Straeten previously served in the Chamber of Representatives for Brussels-Halle-Vilvoorde from 2007 to 2010 and later for Brussels from 2019 until 2020, when she resigned to become energy minister.

== Early life and education ==
In 2000, Van der Straeten obtained a degree in African Studies at Ghent University. Subsequently, she started working as a researcher at Université catholique de Louvain. After this, she went to KU Leuven, where she researched labour discrimination. In 2008, she obtained a law degree at the Vrije Universiteit Brussel.

== Political career ==
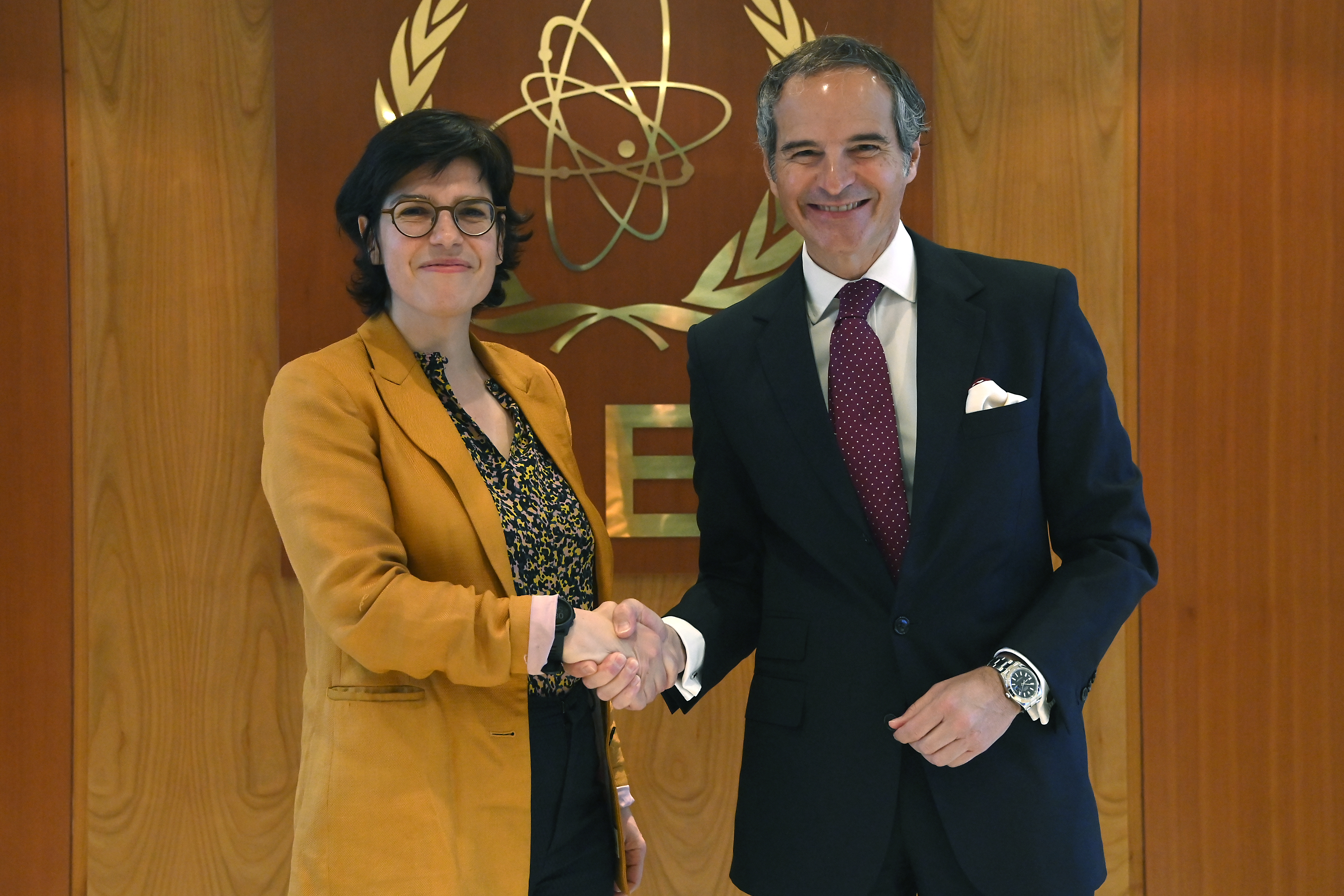
Rafael Mariano Grossi of IAEA meeting Tinne Van der Straeten in 2023

=== Early years ===
She was active in a local environmental group in Malle, before moving to Brussels in 2000. In 2001 she joined Groen (then called Agalev), and soon after she became spokesperson of "Jong Agalev" (Young Agalev, the youth wing of the party). In 2003 she became spokesperson of Agalev, and in 2005 she was elected as vice president of Groen, as running mate of Vera Dua. She held this position until 2007. In 2006 she was elected into the local council of Koekelberg.

=== In the parliament ===
In the 2007 elections, Van der Straeten was elected a representative in the Belgian federal parliament for the first time. Three years later, in the 2010 elections, she wasn't re-elected.

For the local elections of 2018, Van der Straeten re-enters the political foreground. She becomes alderman of Public Works in Koekelberg and a candidate for the 2019 federal elections on the Ecolo list in Brussels where she was re-elected as a representative. In her second passage in the Chamber, she worked out an agreement on the capacity remuneration mechanism.

=== Minister of Energy ===
In 2020 she was sworn in as Minister of Energy in the De Croo Government. She is known for her expertise in wind energy.

Following the 2022 Russian invasion of Ukraine, Van der Straeten led her party's policy shift of extending the life-span of Belgium's remaining nuclear power plants. By July 2022, she reached an agreement in principle with energy provider Engie to extend the lifespan of two nuclear reactors — Doel 4 and Tihange 3 — by 10 years.

In May 2022 she announced that Belgium would be funding work on small modular reactors of 25 million euros a year for four years.

Van der Straeten made way for the Princess Elisabeth Island, the world’s first energy island, for North Sea wind farms.

In the 2024 elections, she was reelected in the Chamber. She stayed in office as a minister until the government of De Wever was sworn in, in early 2025.

== Career in the private sector ==
In 2026, Van der Straeten was appointed Chief Executive Officer (CEO) of WindEurope. She left her position in the federal parliament for this function.
