= Michel De Maegd =

Belgian politician (born 1969)

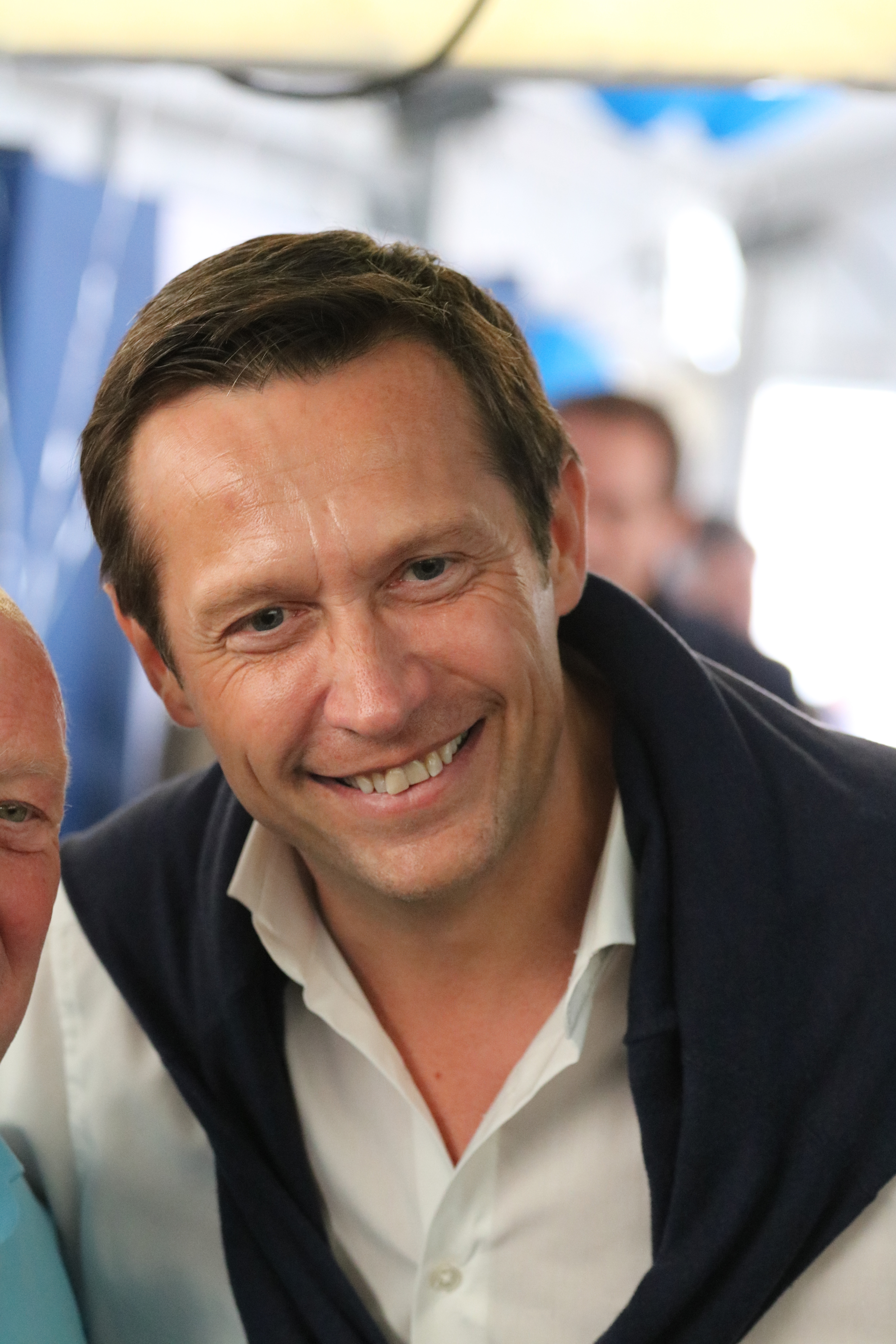
- De Maegd in 2019

Member of the Chamber of Representatives
- Incumbent
- Assumed office 20 June 2019
- Constituency: Brussels

Personal details
- Born: 10 September 1969 (age 57)
- Party: Reformist Movement

Michel De Maegd (born 10 September 1969) is a Belgian politician of the centrist movement Les Engagés serving as a member of the Chamber of Representatives since 2019. Until 2019, he worked as a journalist for RTL-TVI.
