= DierAnimal =

- President: Constance Adonis Villalon
- Founded: 2018
- Headquarters: Brussels
- Ideology: Animal welfare Environmentalism
- Political position: Centre-left
- European political alliance: Animal Politics EU
- Colours: Turquoise

Website
- www.dieranimal.be

DierAnimal (from the Dutch and French words for "animal") is an animal welfare political party in Belgium. The party seeks to create a society where all living things are respected equally regardless of skin color, gender, age or species. It supports "animal liberation" and opposes the meat industry. In the 2019 regional elections, with Victoria Austraet the party won a single seat in the Brussels Parliament.

Austraet was evicted from the party in May 2020 due to disagreements. The party thus lost its only parliamentary representative.

== Election results ==
=== Chamber of Representatives ===
Election	Leader	Votes	%	Seats	+/–	Government
2019	Constance Adonis Villalon	47,733	0.70	0 / 150	New	Extra-parliamentary
2024	Constance Adonis Villalon	10,341	0.15	0 / 150	0	Extra-parliamentary

=== Brussels Parliament ===
Election	Votes	%	Seats	+/–	Notes
2019	5,804	1.27	1 / 89	New	in opposition

=== Flemish Parliament ===
Election	Votes	%	Seats	+/–	Notes
2019	36,944	0.87	0 / 124	New	Extra-parliamentary
2024	8,485	0.19	0 / 124	0	Extra-parliamentary

=== Walloon Parliament ===
Election	Votes	%	Seats	+/–	Notes
2019	18,417	0.91	0 / 75	New	Extra-parliamentary

=== European Parliament ===
Election	Votes	%	Seats	+/–	EP Group
2019	606	0.01	0 / 21	New	–
