= Lydia Mutyebele Ngoi =

Belgian politician (born 1978)

Member of the Chamber of Representatives
- Incumbent
- Assumed office 20 June 2019
- Constituency: Brussels

Personal details
- Born: 7 December 1978 (age 47)
- Party: Socialist Party

Lydia Mutyebele Ngoi (born 7 December 1978) is a Belgian politician of the Socialist Party serving as a member of the Chamber of Representatives since 2024. Until 2024, she was an échevine of Brussels.
