= Youssef Handichi =

Belgian politician (born 1976)

Member of the Chamber of Representatives
- Incumbent
- Assumed office 10 July 2024
- Constituency: Brussels

Personal details
- Born: 23 August 1976 (age 49)
- Party: Reformist Movement (since 2024); Workers' Party (until 2024)

Youssef Handichi (born 23 August 1976) is a Belgian politician of the Reformist Movement serving as a member of the Chamber of Representatives since 2024. From 2014 to 2024, he was a member of the Parliament of the Brussels-Capital Region. Until 2024, he was a member of the Workers' Party.
