= Annik Van den Bosch =

Belgian politician (born 1971)

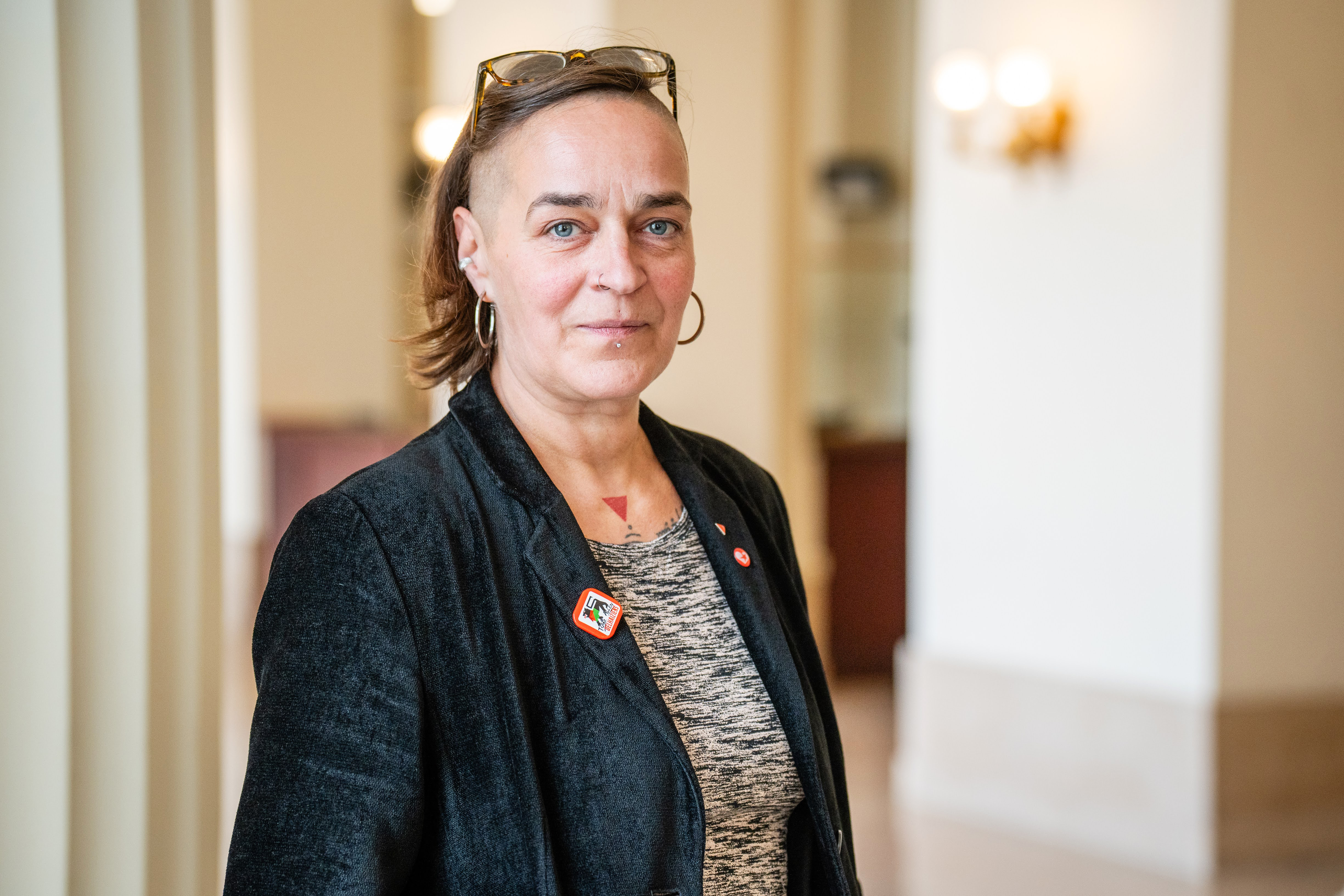
- Van den Bosch in June 2024

Member of the Chamber of Representatives
- Incumbent
- Assumed office 9 June 2024
- Constituency: Brussels

Personal details
- Born: 20 June 1971 (age 54) Ekeren, Belgium
- Party: Workers' Party of Belgium

Annik M. F. Van den Bosch (born 20 June 1971) is a Belgian politician and member of the Chamber of Representatives. A member of the Workers' Party of Belgium, she has represented Brussels since June 2024.

Van den Bosch was born on 20 June 1971 in Ekeren. She worked in the catering industry for many years before working as a monitor in a custom-made company and has also been a live model for art students. She later worked for the Delhaize supermarket chain in Berchem and is a trade union representative for the Association of Employees, Technicians and Managers (BBTK). She was elected to the Chamber of Representatives at the 2024 federal election, receiving 9,937 preference votes.

Van den Bosch has two sons.
