= Patrick Dupriez =

Belgian politician

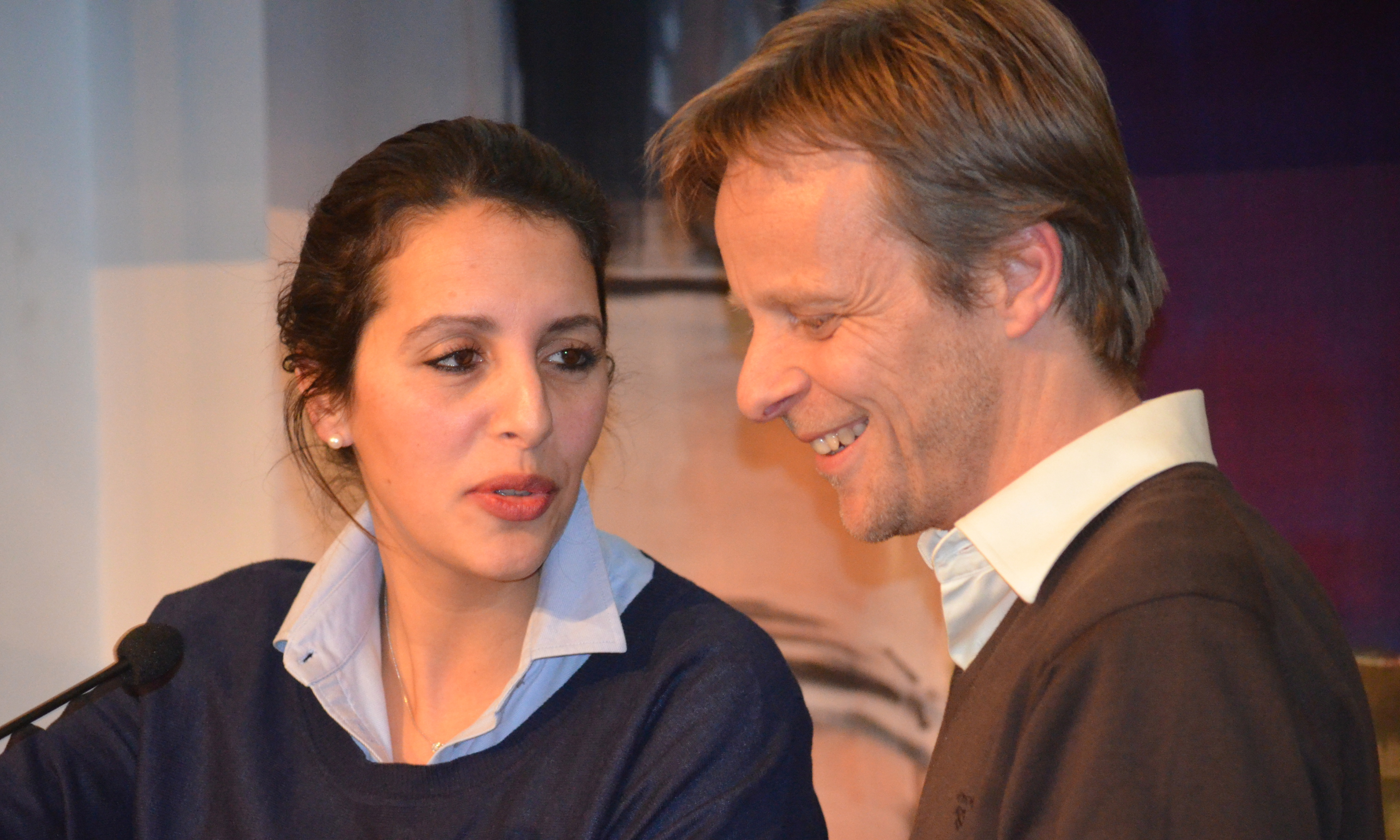
- Zakia Khattabi (left) and Dupriez (right) in Charleroi, March 2015

Leader of Ecolo
- In office 22 March 2015 – 19 October 2018
- Preceded by: Olivier Deleuze & Emily Hoyos
- Succeeded by: Rajae Maouane & Jean-Marc Nollet

President of the Walloon Parliament
- In office 4 March 2012 – 24 May 2014
- Preceded by: Emily Hoyos
- Succeeded by: André Antoine

Member of the Walloon Parliament from Dinant-Philippeville
- In office 2009 – 24 May 2014

Schepen of Ciney
- In office 2006–2009

Member of the Ciney municipal council
- In office 2002–2006

Personal details
- Born: 17 February 1968 (age 58) Yaounde, Cameroon
- Party: Ecolo
- Website: http://www.patrickdupriez.be/

Patrick Dupriez (born 17 February 1968) is a Belgian French-speaking former politician, who led the Ecolo party alongside co-chair Zakia Khattabi from 22 March 2015 until 19 October 2018.

== Biography ==
Patrick Dupriez was born in the Cameroonian capital of Yaounde, before spending the first six years of his life growing up in Côte d'Ivoire, where his father worked as a construction worker. Dupriez later on began attending school in Walloon-Brabant. He studied agriculture at the Université catholique de Louvain and completed his thesis in Chile.

Dupriez participated as a representative of the Belgian Greens at the "Earth Summit" in Rio de Janeiro in 1992, which marked his entry into the Ecolo party, whose ranks he joined in 1985 at the age of 17. He moved to Ciney in 1995.

== Career ==
After his studies, he entered professional life by joining Diobass, an NGO whose objective is to promote the know-how of African farmers' organizations. He then directed the Environmental Education Service of the Province of Namur (the Forest Classes of Chevetogne and the Heritage Classes of Namur) for seven years. In addition to his work of networking educational experiences in the field of environmental education, he implemented the first public market in terms of sustainable food in Wallonia.

In 2002, he was elected to the municipal council of Ciney and was a Schepen from 2006 to 2009. From 2009 to 2014, he was a member of the Walloon Parliament for Ecolo, which he chaired as parliamentary president from 2012 to 2014, succeeding his party colleague Emily Hoyos, who left her position to co-lead Ecolo. He was not re-elected to parliament in the 2014 election. In March 2015, he was elected to the dual leadership of Ecolo together with Zakia Khattabi with 60 percent of the vote at the Ecolo party conference in Charleroi. Dupriez decided to resign from his position on 19 October 2018, citing "personal reasons".
