= François Kompany =

Belgian footballer (born 1989)

Personal information
- Full name: François Kompany
- Date of birth: 28 September 1989 (age 37)
- Place of birth: Uccle, Belgium
- Height: 1.84 m (6 ft 1/2 in)
- Position: Left-back

Youth career
- 2007–2010: KV Mechelen

Senior career*
| Years | Team | Apps | (Gls) |
| 2010–2011 | Macclesfield Town | 0 | (0) |
| 2011–2012 | RWDM Brussels FC | 2 | (0) |
| 2012–2013 | Sint-Niklaas | 21 | (1) |
| 2013–2014 | Eendracht Aalst | 4 | (0) |
| 2014–2015 | RFC Seraing | 13 | (0) |
| 2015–2017 | Roeselare | 21 | (0) |
| 2018–2019 | Roeselare | 26 | (0) |
| 2020 | Patro Eisden | 0 | (0) |
| 2023–2024 | Lokeren-Temse | 35 | (0) |
- * Club domestic league appearances and goals as of 19:26, 9 January 2025 (UTC)

François Kompany (born 28 September 1989) is a Belgian former footballer who played as a left-back.

== Career ==
On 8 March 2020, Kompany joined Patro Eisden.

== Personal life ==
François is the brother of football manager and former footballer Vincent Kompany. François is of Congolese descent through his father, politician Pierre Kompany.
