= Julien Ribaudo =

Belgian politician (born 1987)

Member of the Chamber of Representatives
- Incumbent
- Assumed office 9 June 2024
- Constituency: Brussels

Personal details
- Born: 23 July 1987 (age 38) Charleroi, Belgium
- Party: Workers' Party of Belgium

Julien Ribaudo (born 23 July 1987) is a Belgian politician and member of the Chamber of Representatives. A member of the Workers' Party of Belgium, he has represented Brussels since June 2024.

Ribaudo was born on 23 July 1987 in Charleroi. He is head of RedFox, the youth wing of the Workers' Party of Belgium (PTB). He was elected to the Chamber of Representatives at the 2024 federal election, receiving 6,318 preference votes.
