= Caroline Désir =

Belgian politician (born 1976)

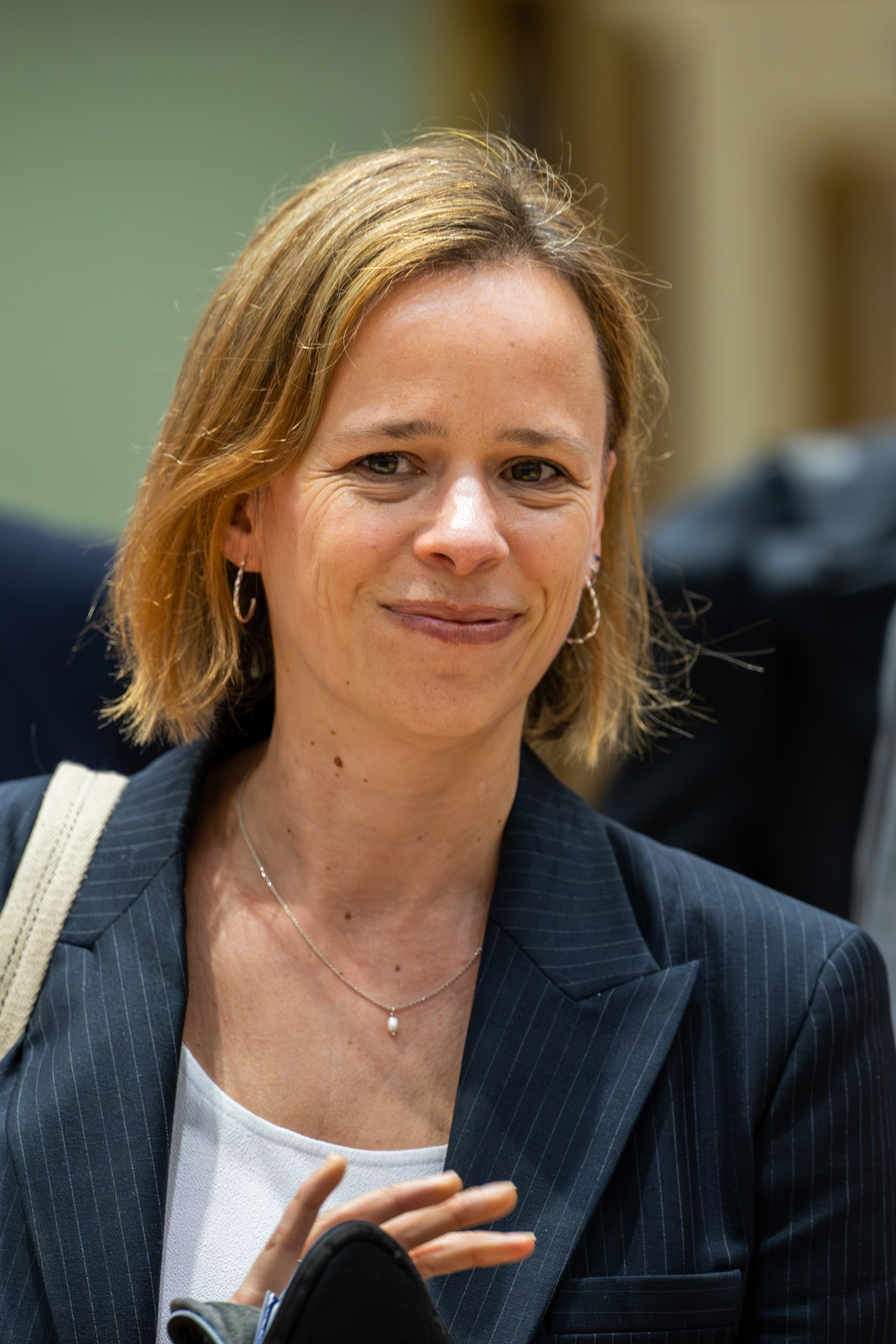
- Désir in 2024

Member of the Chamber of Representatives
- Incumbent
- Assumed office 10 July 2024
- Constituency: Brussels
- In office 20 June 2019 – 19 September 2019
- Succeeded by: Khalil Aouasti
- Constituency: Brussels

Personal details
- Born: 20 October 1976 (age 49)
- Party: Socialist Party

Caroline Désir (born 20 October 1976) is a Belgian politician of the Socialist Party serving as a member of the Chamber of Representatives since 2024. She was a member of the Senate from 2009 to 2013 and a member of the Parliament of the Brussels-Capital Region from 2009 to 2019, and served as minister of education in the government of the French Community from 2019 to 2024.
