= Pierre Jadoul =

Belgian politician (born 1959)

Member of the Chamber of Representatives
- Incumbent
- Assumed office 18 July 2024
- Preceded by: Valérie Glatigny
- Constituency: Brussels

Personal details
- Born: 14 October 1959 (age 66)
- Party: Reformist Movement

Pierre Jadoul (born 14 October 1959) is a Belgian politician of the Reformist Movement serving as a member of the Chamber of Representatives since 2024. From 2013 to 2023, he was the rector of Saint-Louis University, a position in which he was succeeded by Isabelle Hachez.
