= Valérie Glatigny =

Belgian politician (born 1973)

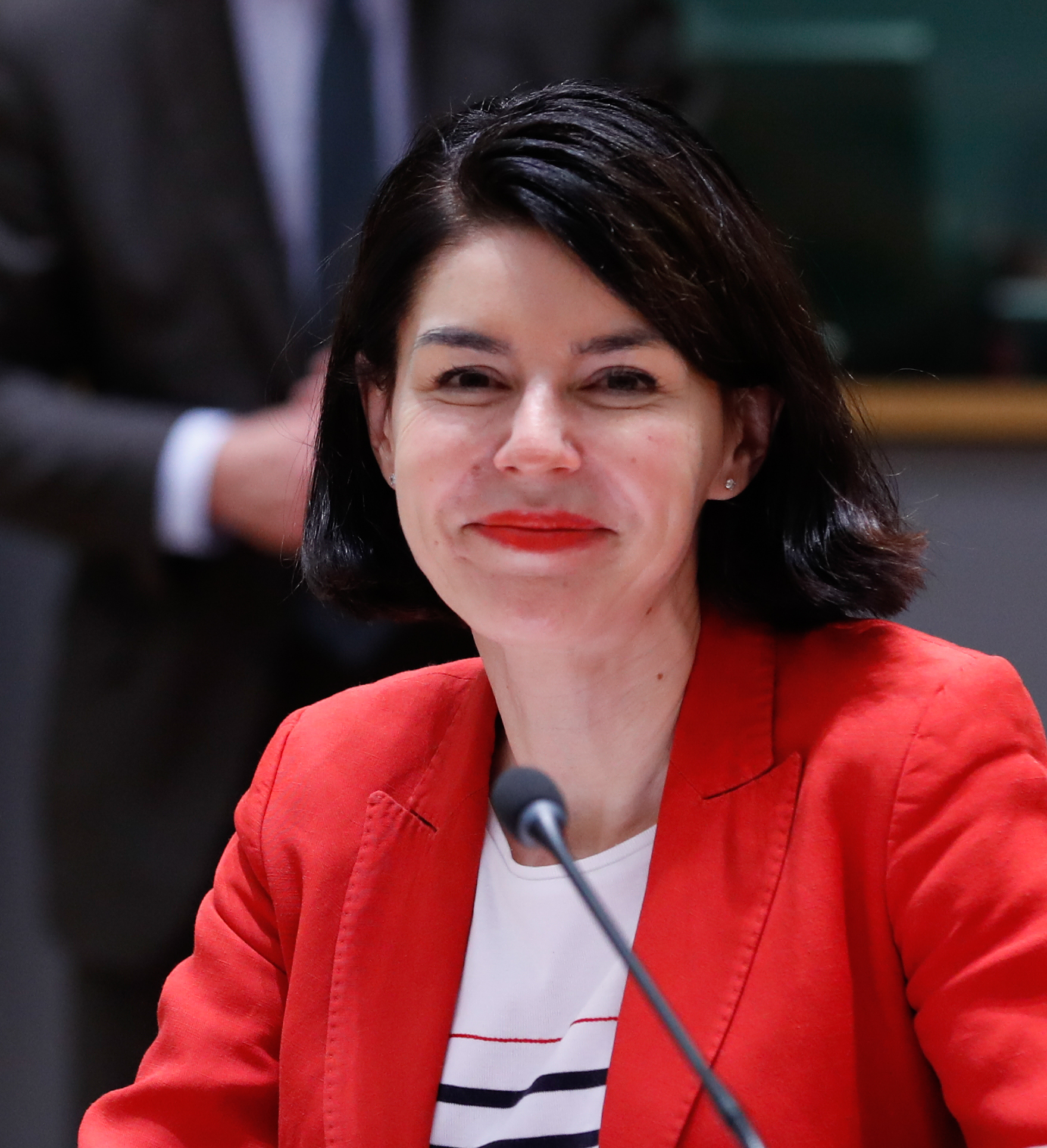
- Glatigny in 2021

Vice President of the French Community
- Incumbent
- Assumed office 16 July 2024

Member of the Chamber of Representatives
- In office 10 July 2024 – 16 July 2024
- Succeeded by: Pierre Jadoul
- Constituency: Brussels

Personal details
- Born: 13 November 1973 (age 52)
- Party: Reformist Movement

Valérie Glatigny (born 13 November 1973) is a Belgian politician of the Reformist Movement. Since 2024, she has served as vice president of the French Community and minister of compulsory education. From 2019 to 2023, she served as minister of higher education. In 2024, she was a member of the Chamber of Representatives.
