= Khalil Aouasti =

Belgian politician (born 1986)

Member of the Chamber of Representatives
- Incumbent
- Assumed office 19 September 2019
- Preceded by: Caroline Désir
- Constituency: Brussels

Personal details
- Born: 21 December 1986 (age 39)
- Party: Socialist Party

Khalil Aouasti (born 21 December 1986) is a Belgian politician of the Socialist Party serving as a member of the Chamber of Representatives. He is an échevin of Koekelberg.
