= Nabil Boukili =

Belgian politician (born 1985)

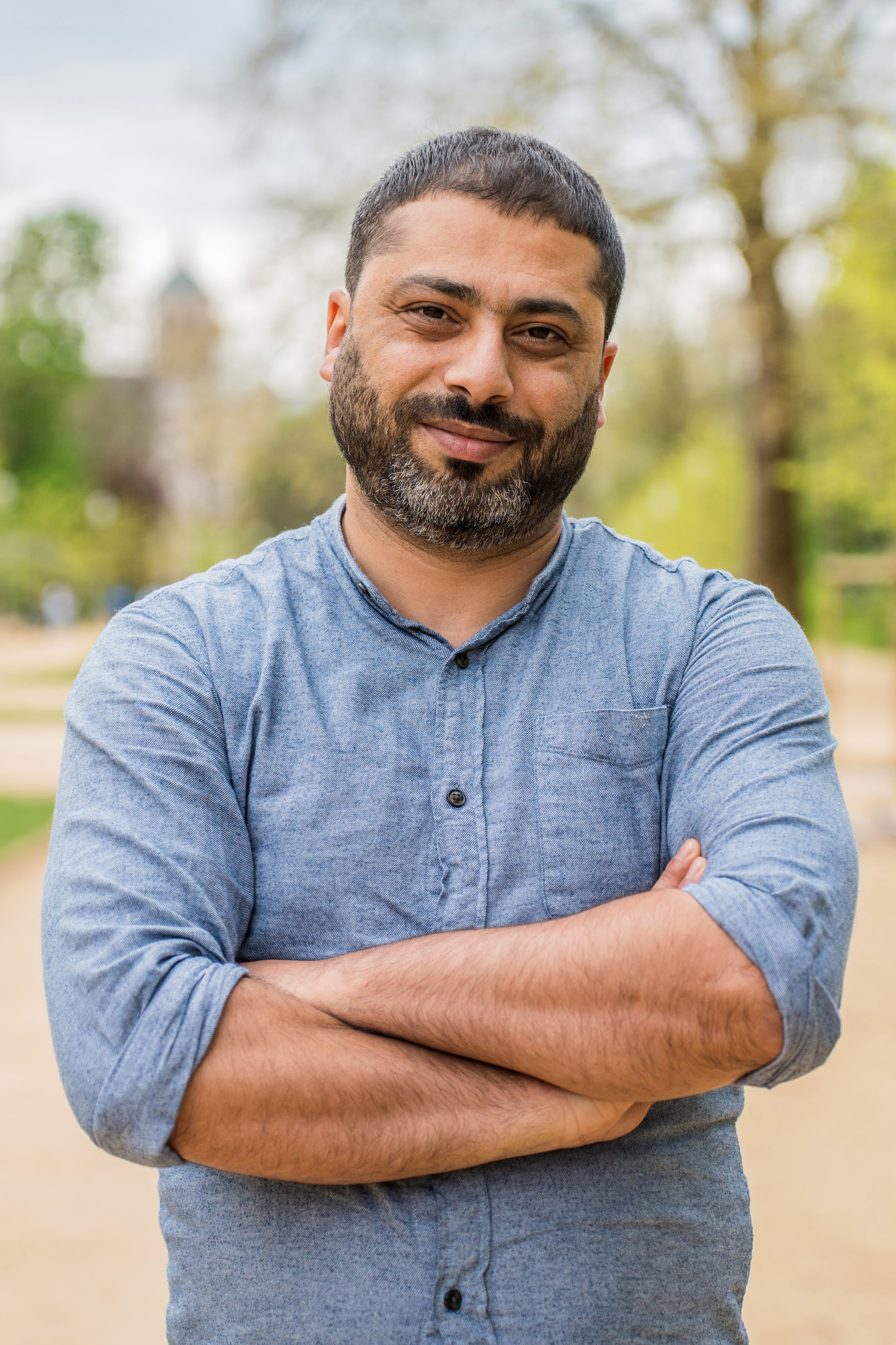
- Boukili in April 2024

Member of the Chamber of Representatives
- Incumbent
- Assumed office 20 June 2019
- Constituency: Brussels

Personal details
- Born: 20 January 1985 (age 41) Oujda, Morocco
- Party: Workers' Party of Belgium
- Education: Université libre de Bruxelles

Nabil Boukili (Arabic: نبيل بوكيلي; born 20 January 1985) is a Belgian politician and member of the Chamber of Representatives. A member of the Workers' Party of Belgium, he has represented Brussels since June 2019.

Boukili was born on 20 January 1985 in Oujda, Morocco. He was educated at the Université libre de Bruxelles. He worked as a security guard at the Royal Museums of Fine Arts of Belgium. He has also worked in the hospitality industry and held various temporary jobs.

Boukili was a member of Comac, the Workers' Party of Belgium's youth wing. He was elected to the municipal council in Forest at the 2018 local election. Boukili resigned from the council in August 2021 after the housing crisis forced him to move from Forest to Anderlecht. He was elected to the Chamber of Representatives at the 2019 federal election. He was re-elected at the 2024 federal election. He received the highest number of preference votes in the Brussels constituency.

Boukili has two children and lives in the garden city of Moortebeek in Anderlecht.

Electoral history of Nabil Boukili
Election	Constituency	Party	Votes	Result
2018 local	Forest	Workers' Party of Belgium	442	Elected
2019 federal	Brussels	Workers' Party of Belgium	13,790	Elected
2024 federal	Brussels	Workers' Party of Belgium	29,627	Elected
