= Pierre Kompany =

Belgian politician (born 1947)

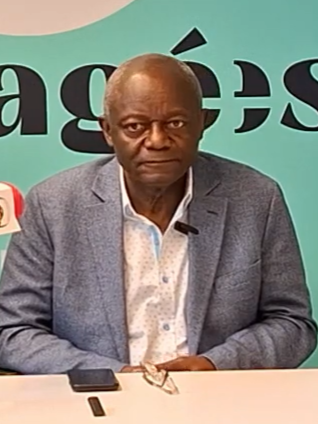
- Kompany in 2024

Member of the Chamber of Representatives
- Incumbent
- Assumed office 9 June 2024
- Constituency: Brussels

Mayor of Ganshoren
- In office 2018–2022
- Succeeded by: Jean-Paul Van Laethem

Representative in the Brussels Parliament
- In office 2014–2024

Personal details
- Born: 8 September 1947 (age 79) Costermansville, Belgian Congo
- Party: Les Engagés, Humanist Democratic Centre (former)
- Children: 3, including Vincent and François
- Education: University of Kinshasa
- Profession: Politician

Pierre Kompany (born 8 September 1947) is a Belgian politician of Les Engagés and formerly the Humanist Democratic Centre. He was elected mayor of Ganshoren in 2018 and is the father of the footballers Vincent Kompany and François Kompany. He is the first Congolese mayor in Belgium.

Kompany was born in the Belgian Congo and came to Belgium in 1975 as a political refugee from Zaïre, where he had been interned for opposing dictator Mobutu Sese Seko. He drove a taxi while studying for a mechanical engineering degree to support his wife and three children. Kompany faced racism for marrying Jocelyne, a rural white woman. The couple divorced when Vincent Kompany was 14 and she died when he was 20.

In 2014, he was elected to the Parliament of the Brussels-Capital Region, and he was re-elected in 2019.

He was elected to the Chamber of Representatives in the 2024 Belgian federal election.
