= Samuel Cogolati =

Belgian politician (born 1989)

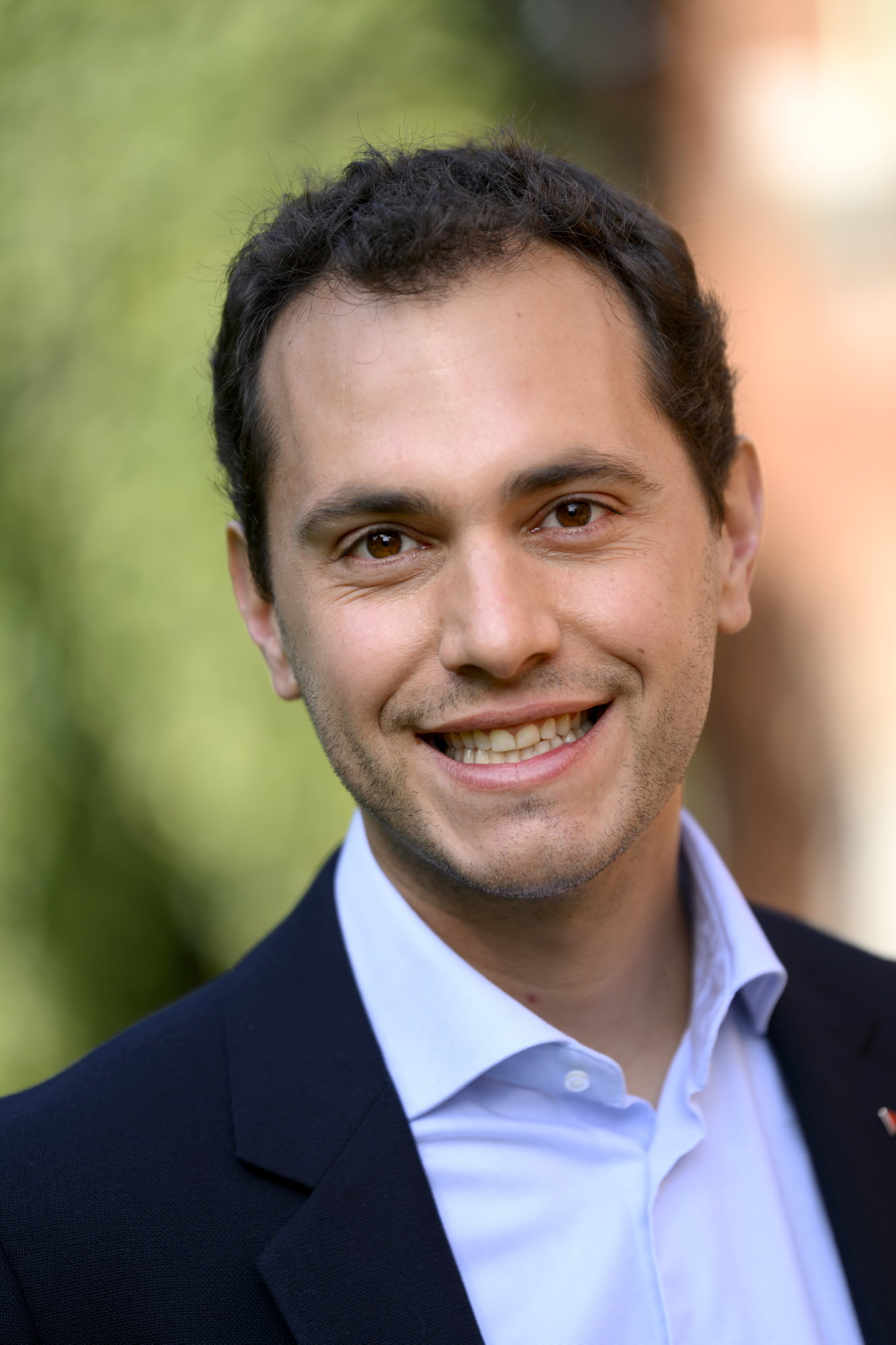
- Cogolati in 2024

Co-President of Ecolo
- Incumbent
- Assumed office 13 July 2024 Serving with Marie Lecocq (until 2026); Gilles Vanden Burre (since 2026)
- Preceded by: Jean-Marc Nollet

Member of the Chamber of Representatives
- In office 20 June 2019 – 8 May 2024
- Constituency: Liège

Personal details
- Born: 12 March 1989 (age 37)
- Party: Ecolo

Samuel Cogolati (born 12 March 1989) is a Belgian politician serving as co-president of Ecolo since 2024. From 2019 to 2024, he was a member of the Chamber of Representatives.

== Early life ==
Cogolati was born on 12 March 1989 in Liège, Belgium. When he was fourteen, Cogolati joined Ecolo. He eventually obtained a master's degree in law from KU Leuven in 2013, and then a Master of Laws from Harvard Law School in 2014. The following year, in 2015, he became a municipal councillor of Huy representing the party. Simultaneously, he worked as a researcher for the Leuven Centre for Global Governance Studies at KU Leuven from 2014 to 2019.

During the 2019 Belgian federal election, he ran to be a member of the Chamber of Representatives for Liège, a seat he won. Since becoming a representative, he has particularly focused on the recognition of the Persecution of Uyghurs in China. Due to his campaigning regarding Uyghurs, particularly for submitting a resolution condemning the persecution of Muslims in Xinjiang, he was put on a Chinese sanctions list. The Chinese government accused him of harming Chinese sovereignty. Following this, the Belgian Minister of Foreign Affairs, Sophie Wilmès, affirmed that she supported Cogolati. He was also the target of a digital attack in 2023, which was linked to the Chinese state hacking group, APT31.

In 2022, he announced he would teach courses at the Catholic University of Graben, which is located in North Kivu in the Democratic Republic of the Congo. Cogolati was not re-elected to parliament in the 2024 Belgian federal election.
