= Ridouane Chahid =

Belgian politician (born 1977)

Member of the Chamber of Representatives
- Incumbent
- Assumed office 10 June 2024
- Constituency: Brussels

Personal details
- Born: 12 August 1977 (age 48)
- Party: Socialist Party

Ridouane Chahid (born 12 August 1977) is a Belgian politician of the Socialist Party serving as a member of the Chamber of Representatives since 2024. He previously served as leader of the Socialist Party in the Parliament of the Brussels-Capital Region.
