= Citizen Collective =

Citizen Collective Collectif Citoyen
- Abbreviation: CC
- Leader: Collective leadership
- Spokesperson: voir statut
- Founded: February 2019; 7 years ago
- Headquarters: Ans
- Ideology: Participatory democracy; Anti-establishment; Euroscepticism; Social liberalism
- Political position: Syncretic
- Colors: Teal

Website
- https://collectifcitoyen.be

Citizen Collective (French: Collectif Citoyen) is a minor political party in Belgium founded in 2019, which is active in Wallonia and Brussels.

== History ==
=== Federal and regional elections ===
Collectif Citoyen was founded in 2019 following the gathering of a multitude of local Walloon parties with the aim of participating in the legislative elections in May.

The main aims of the programme are to introduce participatory democracy and improve the transparency of elected representatives, parties, civil servants and the functioning of the justice system. The movement also advocates a protectionist economic vision centred on the middle class, and the refinancing of social security and education. The party obtained an honourable score of 0.31, placing it 16th out of 32 in the federal parliamentary elections. In Wallonia, the party scored 1.31%, finishing 9th out of 18. In Brussels, it presented only one list in the French-speaking college, winning 0.52% of the vote (10th out of 14).

In 2024, the party will deepen its programme by adding a geopolitical axis in which it opposes the European Union, NATO and the WHO. CC will improve its score everywhere by obtaining 0.51% of the votes in the federal legislative elections. The same trend can be observed in Wallonia, where it won 1.60% of the vote, and in Brussels (French-speaking college) with 1.45%.

=== 2024 Local elections ===
For the local elections in October 2024, the party has succeeded in presenting small lists in 19 communes in Wallonia and 4 in Brussels. However, it only won a handful of seats: 5 in Sprimont via the Mouvement Citoyen Sprimont (21%) and 1 in Antoing (12.4%). It also lost its only elected member in Anthisnes with 7.9%.

== Organisation ==
The party is organised through citizens' assemblies and collegiate management.

== Election results ==
=== Chamber of Representatives ===
Election	Votes	%	Seats	+/−	Government
2019	21,092	0.31	0 / 150	New	Extra-parliamentary
2024	35,706	0.51	0 / 150	0	Extra-parliamentary

=== Walloon Parliament ===
Election	Votes	%	Seats	+/−	Government
2019	26,673	1.31	0 / 75	New	Extra-parliamentary
2024	33,200	1.60	0 / 75	0	Extra-parliamentary

=== Brussels Parliament ===
Election	Votes	%	Seats	+/−	Government
2019 (French language group)	2,029	0.59	0 / 72	New	Extra-parliamentary
2024 (French language group)	5,642	1.45	0 / 72	0	Extra-parliamentary
