= Ahmed Laaouej =

Belgian politician (born 1969)

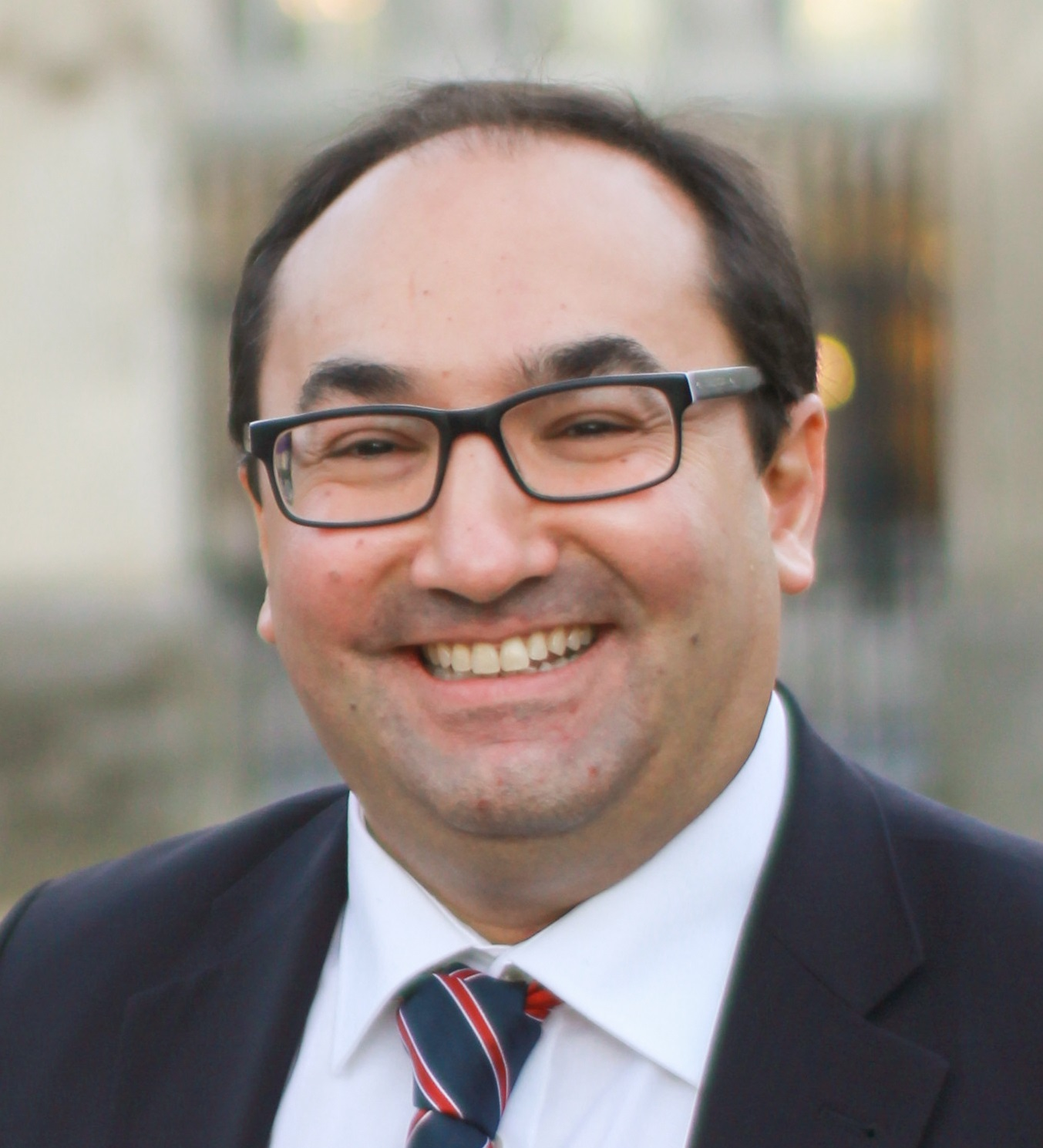

Ahmed Laaouej (French pronunciation: [amɛd lawɛʒ]; born 8 December 1969 in Liège, Belgium) is a Belgian politician. He is a member of the Belgian Chamber of Representatives elected through the Parti Socialiste. He is the mayor of the commune of Koekelberg and Head of the PS parliamentary group in the House of Representatives.

During the elections of 25 May 2014, Ahmed Laaouej turned-out in 4th place on the PS list in the House of Representatives for the district of Brussels and is elected federal deputy with 12,996 votes preferably thus achieving the 7th best individual result for all parties in Brussels.

== Background and education ==
Ahmed was born on 8 December 1969 to a Moroccan family originally from the Rif region (in the Kebdana region near Berkane in eastern Morocco), he is the fifth son in a family of six children. Laaouej is the first one of his family to be born in Belgium. His father, who arrived in Belgium in 1962, was a miner in a coal mine in the Liège region. His mother, a housewife, rejoined her husband in 1969 with her four sons and a daughter. He was born and raised in a popular district of the commune of Beyne-Heusay where he began his schooling. He continued his secondary studies at the Provincial Institute of Secondary Education in Fléron and then at the Royal Athenaeum in Jupille. He joined the law faculty of the University of Liège in 1987.

He holds a law degree, and he continued his studies with a specialization diploma in economic and fiscal law which he obtained with great distinction in 1993.

== Professional career ==
In 1993, he entered the Ministry of Finance where he began his professional career, first with corporate tax and then joined the Special Tax Inspectorate (ISI). He joined the CGSP in 1995, where he met André Graindorge and Michèle Belot who would play a decisive role in bringing him closer to the Socialist Party.

In 2000, he joined the Emile Vandervelde Institute (IEV), the Socialist Party's study center, to occupy the function of Adviser on fiscal and public service matters. In this position, he supported Elio Di Rupo, President of the PS, and Frédéric Delcor, then director of the ENI, during various negotiations, in particular those relating to the formation of the Federal Regional and Community governments acts (2003).

In 2004, he was appointed director of cabinet to the Minister of the Civil Service and Sports Claude Eerdekens where he contributed to the implementation of a sport promotion policy through, in particular, the establishment of "Sport Vouchers" "throughout the Wallonia-Brussels Federation, a device enabling children from disadvantaged backgrounds to join a sports club or to subsidize sports equipment.

Following the 2019 federal elections, which saw the breakthrough of the Vlaams Belang in Flanders, Laaouej called for the formation of a democratic front which would exclude the Vlaams Belang and the N-VA from the federal government. He also criticizes the fact that King Philippe received Tom Van Grieken, president of the VB, as part of the royal post-electoral consultations; Laaouej asserts that this contributes to the trivialization of the far right and its speeches.

== Commitment to the Federal Parliament (Senate and Chamber) ==
In 2009, Ahmed Laaouej stood as a candidate in the regional elections for the Brussels Region. Occupying the 51st spot on the list PS, he received more than 2,000 votes which is enough to get a seat. In 2010, Elio Di Rupo proposed to the PS Bureau to present him for designation as a co-opted Senator. Designated Senator co-opted in July 2010, he thus became the Vice-President of the Finance and Economy Commission (FINECO) and also sits as a member of the Justice Commission of the Belgian Senate.

Ahmed Laaouej is the author of several bills debated in the Senate and relating, among other things, to the prohibition of speculation on the price of foodstuffs, the prohibition of bonuses and other advantages for bank managers assisted by the Belgian State, on the reimbursement of public aid in the event of redundancies on the stock market, on strengthening the fight against money laundering.

In the House of Representatives, he notably initiated a law aimed at prohibiting the activity of vulture funds on Belgian territory. Following the scandal of Panama Papers, he became president of the Special Parliamentary Committee to look into the tax evasion mechanisms and in particular the Belgian part of the scandal "Panama Papers".

Ahmed Laaouej is a municipal councilor for the opposition in the Brussels commune of Koekelberg.
