= Agora (Belgium) =

- Founded: 2019
- Headquarters: Brussels
- Ideology: Participatory democracy
- Political position: Single-issue
- Colours: Turquoise
- Chamber of Representatives: 0 / 150
- Senate: 0 / 60
- Brussels Parliament (Flemish seats): 0 / 17

Website
- www.agora.brussels

Agora is a political party in Belgium in the Brussels Region. The party does not have a typical political platform, instead focusing on the single issue of participatory democracy. The party seeks to establish a citizens' assembly representing the Brussels population that would deliberate on local issues. In the 2019 regional elections, the party won a single seat in the Brussels Parliament.

== Election results ==
=== Chamber of Representatives ===
Election	Votes	%	Seats	+/-	Government
2024	3,473	0.05	0 / 150	New	Extra-parliamentary

=== Regional ===
==== Brussels Parliament ====
Election	Votes	%	Seats	+/-	Government
2019 (Dutch language group)	3,629	5.18	1 / 17	New	Opposition
