= Zakia Khattabi =

Belgian-Moroccan politician

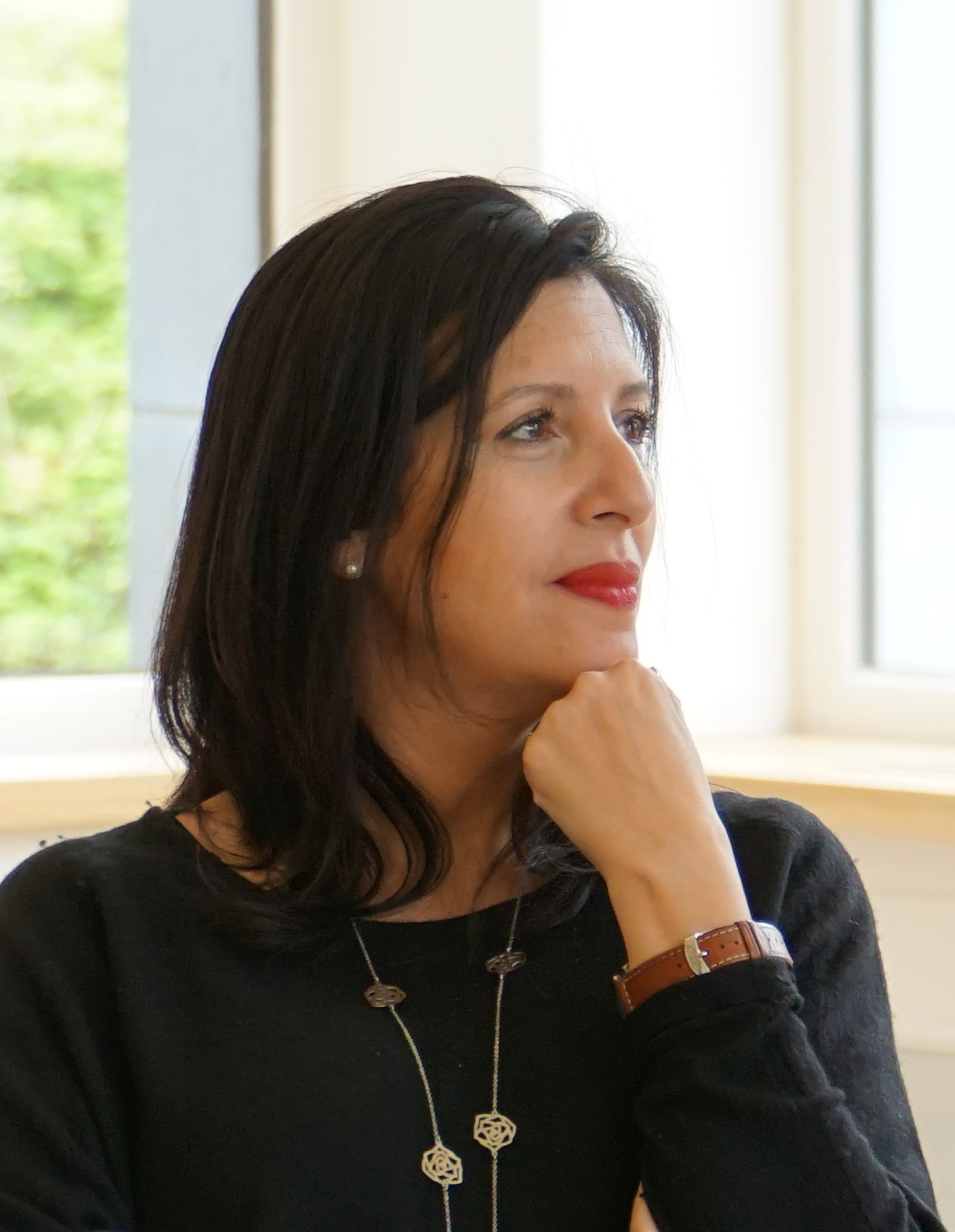
- Khattabi in 2022

Minister of Climate, Environment, Sustainable Development and Green Deal
- In office 1 October 2020 – 3 February 2025
- Monarch: Philippe
- Prime Minister: Alexander De Croo
- Preceded by: Marie-Christine Marghem
- Succeeded by: Jean-Luc Crucke

Leader of Ecolo
- In office 22 March 2015 – 15 September 2019
- Preceded by: Olivier Deleuze and Emily Hoyos
- Succeeded by: Rajae Maouane and Jean-Marc Nollet

Member of the Parliament of the Brussels-Capital Region
- In office 7 June 2009 – 25 May 2014

Member of the Parliament of the French Community of Belgium
- In office 24 September 2009 – 25 May 2014

Member of the Chamber of Representatives
- In office 19 June 2014 – 1 October 2020

Personal details
- Born: 15 January 1976 (age 50) Saint-Josse-ten-Noode, Belgium
- Citizenship: Belgium; Morocco
- Party: Ecolo
- Education: Université libre de Bruxelles

Zakia Khattabi (Arabic: زكية الخطابي; born 15 January 1976) is a Belgian-Moroccan politician who was the co-president of the Ecolo party.

Khattabi was born in Saint-Josse-ten-Noode in Brussels to Moroccan parents. She studied at Université libre de Bruxelles. She believes in political ecology and is a feminist activist, which led to her joining the Ecolo party. She served as federal Minister of Climate, Environment, Sustainable Development and Green Deal in the De Croo Government led by Prime Minister Alexander De Croo from 1 October 2020 until 3 February 2025.

== Political career and views ==
She became a member of the Brussels Parliament in 2009 as the local councillor for Ixelles, and then also sat in the Wallonia-Brussels Federation. She later became president of the Ecolo group at the Belgian Senate. Khattabi was elected, along with Patrick Dupriez, as co-leader of Ecolo during a party conference in Charleroi in 2015. Dupriez was replaced in 2018 by Jean-Marc Nollet.

In a 2018 interview with Le Soir, Khattabi called for a "new model" for Brussels without separate Flemish and Francophone communities. That same year, following the killing of 14 women from macho violence in Belgium that year, Khattabi called for the recognition of femicide.

Under Khattabi's co-presidency, Ecolo made large gains in Brussels in the local elections of 2018 to become the second largest party there. In the 2019 federal election Ecolo doubled its share of the vote, and gained its biggest number of seats yet, which Khattabi attributed to a rising "green wave" in Europe.

In January 2020, Khattabi failed to gain sufficient support from Belgian senators to become one of the judges at the Belgian Constitutional Court. Her candidature received the votes of only 38 of 60 senators, whereas a supermajority of two-thirds was required. The vote should have been held in November 2019 originally, but was postponed after a campaign by right-wing party N-VA and far-right Vlaams Belang against Khattabi's candidature.

== Honours ==
- Belgium: Order of Leopold (21 May 2014)
