= Rajae Maouane =

Belgian politician

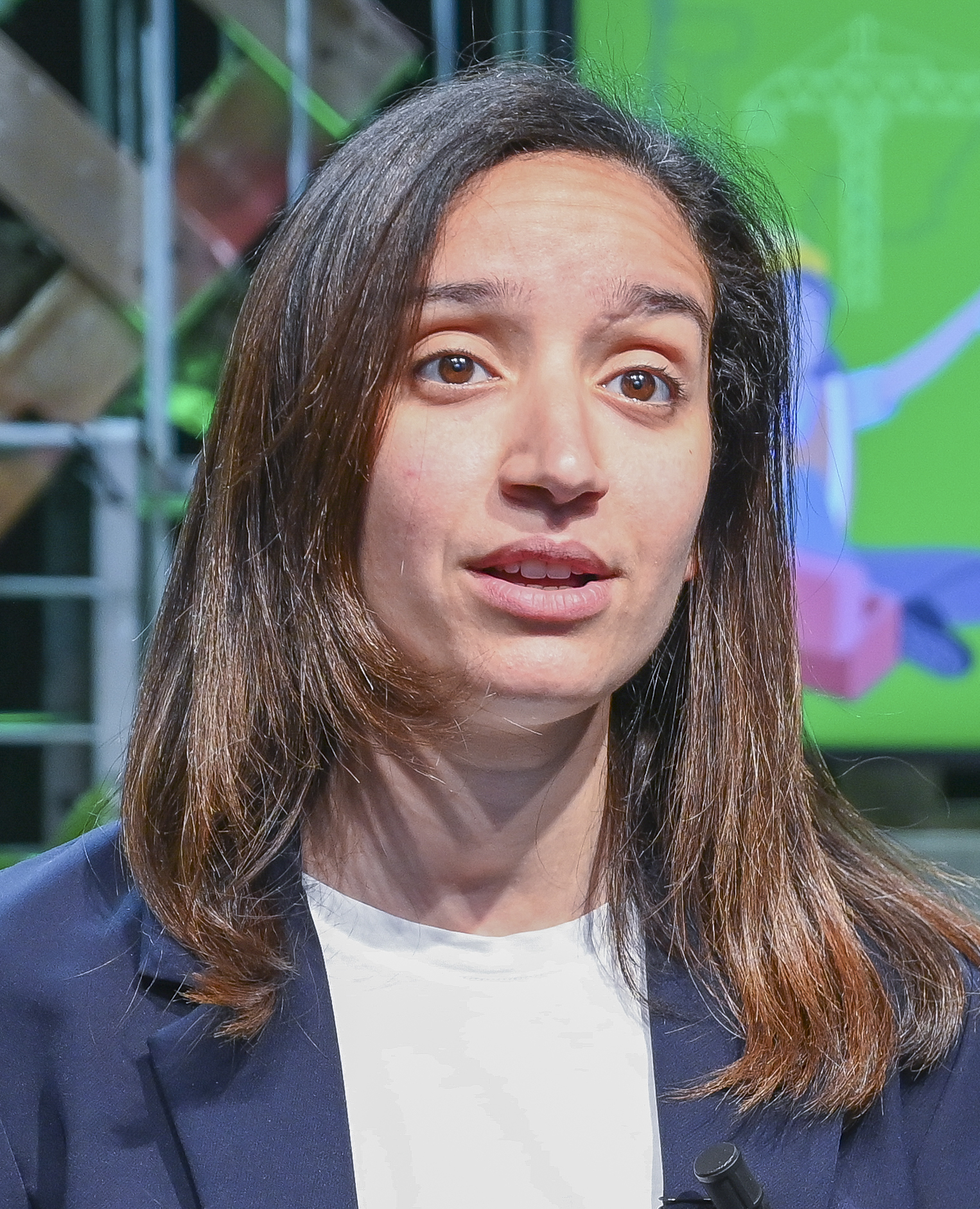
Maouane in 2021

Rajae Maouane (pronounced [ʁaʒa mawan]; born 3 July 1989) is a Belgian politician who served co-president of Ecolo.

== Biography ==
Rajae Maouane was born on 3 July 1989 in Uccle to a family of Moroccan Belgians. Her father was a laborer and her mother was a housewife. Maouane completed her secondary studies at the Catholic school Institut Maris Stella in Laeken. She is a passionate football player and fan.

During her studies as a bachelor in communications between 2009 and 2012 at the Institut supérieur de formation sociale et de communication (ISFSC), a Catholic High School, Maouane did internships in 2010 for the satirical newspaper Pan and in 2011 at the internal communication and press relations branches of the Brussels Intercommunal Transport Company.

=== Political life ===
Maouane's first contacts with the political sphere began when she was a student, and after completing her studies she served as for the press service for Ecolo. From 2013 to 2018, Maouane served as an assistant to Sarah Turine, échevin of Molenbeek-Saint-Jean, where she also served as political co-secretary of the party's local chapter.

Since 2016, Maouane has served as the co-president for the Brussels regional branch of Ecolo. Additionally, she was elected to the Communal Council of Molenbeek in December 2018 and to the Brussels-Capital Region Parliament in the 2019 Belgian regional elections. As a member of the Brussels Regional Parliament, Maouane also has a seat in the Parliament of the French Community of Belgium.

For the 2019 Brussels regional elections, Maouane was designated fourth on the Ecolo party list. Maouane was elected to the fourth spot on the list with 4,297 votes.

In August 2019, Maouane declared her candidacy as co-president of Ecolo on a ticket with Jean-Marc Nollet. At the party's general assembly in Namur, Maouane and Nollet, without any other opponent, received 92% of votes. Upon her election as co-president, she resigned her posts in the Brussels and French Community Parliaments. She was succeeded in both offices by Margaux De Ré.
