= List of members of the Parliament of the French Community, 2024–2029 =

The Parliament of the French Community of Belgium elected in 2024 has 94 deputies:

- 75 deputies elected by direct universal suffrage to the Walloon parliament except the German speakers who are replaced by their first French-speaking substitute:
- 19 deputies elected by the French-speaking deputies of the Brussels Parliament from among their number as follows:

LE	PS	MR	Ecolo	PTB	lib.res
2	5	5	2	4	1

Parliament appoints the 10 senators referred to in Article 67, § 1 , 2 of the Constitution in accordance with the procedure set out in Articles 212bis, 212ter and 213 of the Electoral Code. These deputies are delegated to the Senate as community senators.

== Bureau ==
- President: Benoît Dispa (LE) replaced Jean-Paul Wahl (MR)
- Vice-president :
1. Caroline Cassart-Mailleux (MR) replaced Mourad Sahli (PS)
2. Mourad Sahli (PS) replaced Mathilde Vandorpe (LE)
3. Anne Laffut (MR) replaced Philippe Dodrimont (MR)
- Secretaries
1. Sabine Roberty (PS)
2. Alice Bernard (PTB)
3. Clémentine Barzin (MR) replaced Guillaume Soupart (MR)
- Group leader
  - MR: Diana Nikolic
  - PS: Martin Casier
  - LE: Mathilde Vandorpe replaced Benoît Dispa
  - PTB: Alice Bernard
  - Ecolo: Matteo Segers

== Parties ==
=== Mouvement réformateur (31) ===
Constituency	Deputy	Deputy replaced	Function
Bruxelles	Loubna Azghoud		
Bruxelles	Clémentine Barzin		Secretary of Parliament
Luxembourg	Willy Borsus		
Huy-Waremme	Caroline Cassart-Mailleux		Vice-president of Parliament
Verviers	Stéphanie Cortisse		
Liège	Fabien Culot	Virginie Defrang-Firket	
Charleroi-Thuin	Tanguy Dardenne		
Soignies-La Louvière	Maxime Daye		
Nivelles	Valérie De Bue		
Liège	Arnaud Dewez		
Liège	Philippe Dodrimont		
Huy-Waremme	Manu Douette		
Luxembourg	Yves Evrard		
Dinant-Philippeville	Richard Fournaux		
Verviers	Charles Gardier		
Nivelles	Nicolas Janssen		
Luxembourg	Anne Laffut		Vice-president of Parliament
Namur	Vincent Maillen		
Tournai-Ath-Mouscron	Marie-Christine Marghem		
Nivelles	Olivier Maroy	Anne-Catherine Dalcq	
Mons	Chris Massaki	Jacqueline Galant	
Liège	Diana Nikolic		Group leader
Tournai-Ath-Mouscron	Vincent Palermo		
Bruxelles	Françoise Schepmans		
Bruxelles	Eléonore Simonet		
Mons	Guillaume Soupart		
Charleroi-Thuin	Caroline Taquin		
Namur	Stéphanie Thoron		
Charleroi-Thuin	Nicolas Tzanetatos	Adrien Dolimont	
Bruxelles	Gaëtan Van Goidsenhoven		
Nivelles	Jean-Paul Wahl		
Dinant-Philippeville	Valérie Warzée-Caverenne		

=== Parti socialiste (24) ===
Constituency	Deputy	Deputy replaced	Function
Bruxelles	Leila Agic		
Bruxelles	Martin Casier		Group leader
Huy-Waremme	Christophe Collignon		
Tournai-Ath-Mouscron	Dorothée De Rodder		
Verviers	Valérie Dejardin		
Soignies-La Louvière	Laurent Devin		
Bruxelles	Ibrahim Dönmez		
Bruxelles	Nadia El Yousfi		
Dinant-Philippeville	Eddy Fontaine		
Charleroi-Thuin	Isabella Greco	Thomas Dermine	
Luxembourg	Mélissa Hanus		
Verviers	Ersel Kaynak		
Bruxelles	Fadila Laanan		
Nivelles	Anne Lambelin		
Tournai-Ath-Mouscron	Bruno Lefebvre		
Mons	Jean-Pierre Lepine	Florence Monier	
Mons	Nicolas Martin		
Liège	Christie Morreale		
Charleroi-Thuin	Özlem Özen		
Soignies-La Louvière	Sophie Pécriaux		
Liège	Sabine Roberty		Secretary of Parliament
Charleroi-Thuin	Mourad Sahli		Vice-president of Parliament
Namur	Éliane Tillieux		
Liège	Thierry Witsel		

=== Les Engagés (19) ===
Constituency	Deputy	Deputy replaced	Function
Dinant-Philippeville	Christophe Bastin		
Verviers	Jean-Paul Bastin		
Mons	Pascal Baurain		
Nivelles	Vincent Blondel		
Charleroi-Thuin	Jean-Jacques Cloquet		
Liège	Olivier de Wasseige		
Bruxelles	Alain Deneef		
Charleroi-Thuin	Caroline Desalle		
Namur	Benoît Dispa		President of Parliament
Liège	Sophie Fafchamps		
Luxembourg	Anne-Catherine Goffinet		
Nivelles	Armelle Gysen		
Luxembourg	François Huberty		
Huy-Waremme	Marie Jacqmin		
Bruxelles	Stéphanie Lange		
Namur	Geneviève Lazaron		
Soignies-La Louvière	Loris Resinelli	François Desquesnes	
Tournai-Ath-Mouscron	Mathilde Vandorpe		Group Leader and vice-president of Parliament

=== Parti du travail de Belgique (12) ===
Constituency	Deputy	Deputy replaced	Function
Liège	Rachida Aït Alouha		
Charleroi-Thuin	Jamila Ammi		
Bruxelles	Bruno Bauwens		
Liège	Alice Bernard		Group Leader and vice-president of Parliament
Bruxelles	Octave Daube		
Tournai-Ath-Mouscron	Jori Dupont		
Liège	Julien Liradelfo		
Charleroi-Thuin	Germain Mugemangango		
Soignies-La Louvière	Amandine Pavet		
Bruxelles	Marisol Revelo Paredes		
Namur	Patricia Van Walle		
Bruxelles	Manon Vidal		

=== Ecolo (7) ===
Constituency	Deputy	Deputy replaced	Function
Liège	Veronica Cremasco		
Bruxelles	Margaux De Ré		
Verviers	Hajib El Hajjaji		
Namur	Stéphane Hazée		
Tournai-Ath-Mouscron	Bénédicte Linard		
Bruxelles	Matteo Segers		Group leader
Nivelles	Céline Tellier		

=== lib.res (1) ===
Constituency	Deputy	Deputy replaced	Function
Bruxelles	Fabian Maingain		

== See also ==
- List of members of the Parliament of the French Community, 2009–2014
