= 2024 Belgian regional elections =

The 2024 Belgian regional elections were held on Sunday 9 June, the same day as the 2024 European Parliament election as well as the Belgian federal election.

In the regional elections, new representatives are chosen for the Flemish Parliament, Walloon Parliament, Brussels Parliament and the Parliament of the German-speaking Community. The Parliament of the French Community is composed of all elected members of the Walloon Parliament (German-speaking members are replaced) and 19 of the French-speaking members of the Brussels Parliament.

== Electoral system ==
The regional parliaments have limited power over their own election; federal law largely regulates this and the federal government organises the elections, which occur per Article 117 of the Constitution on the same day as the European Parliament elections.

As such, all regional parliaments are elected using proportional representation under the D'Hondt method.

== Flemish Parliament ==
2024 Flemish parliamentary election
- 9 June 2024

All 124 seats in the Flemish Parliament 63 seats needed for a majority
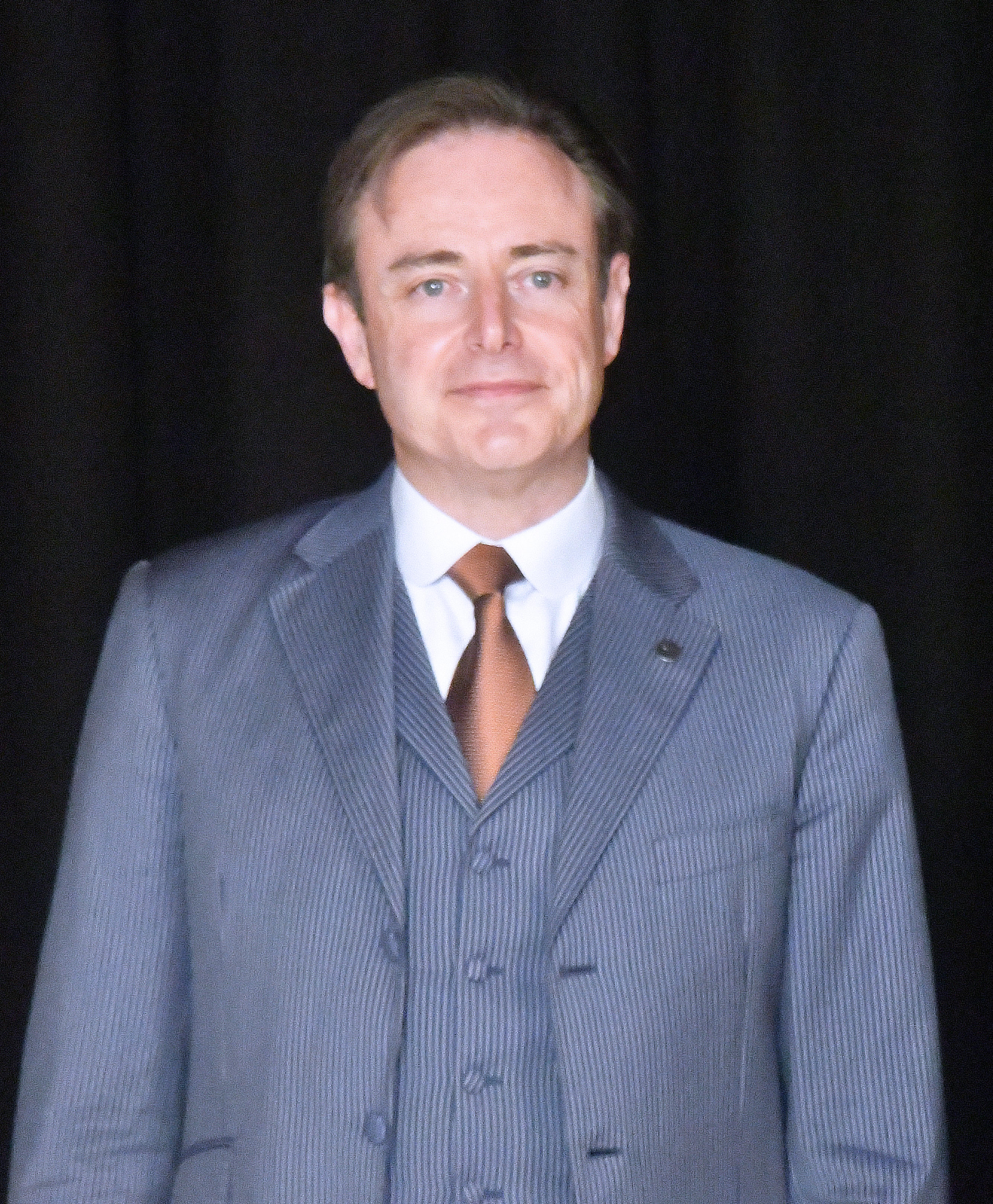

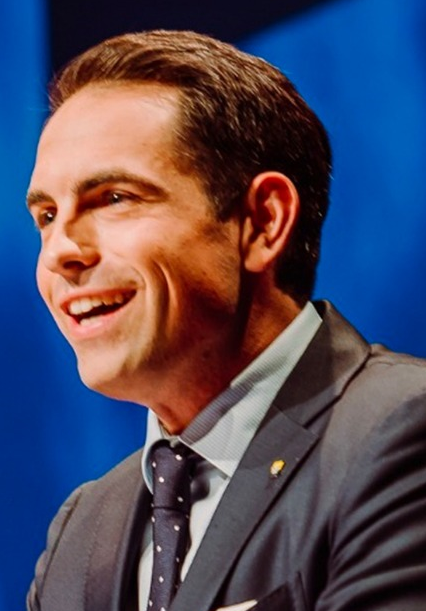

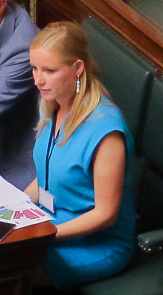

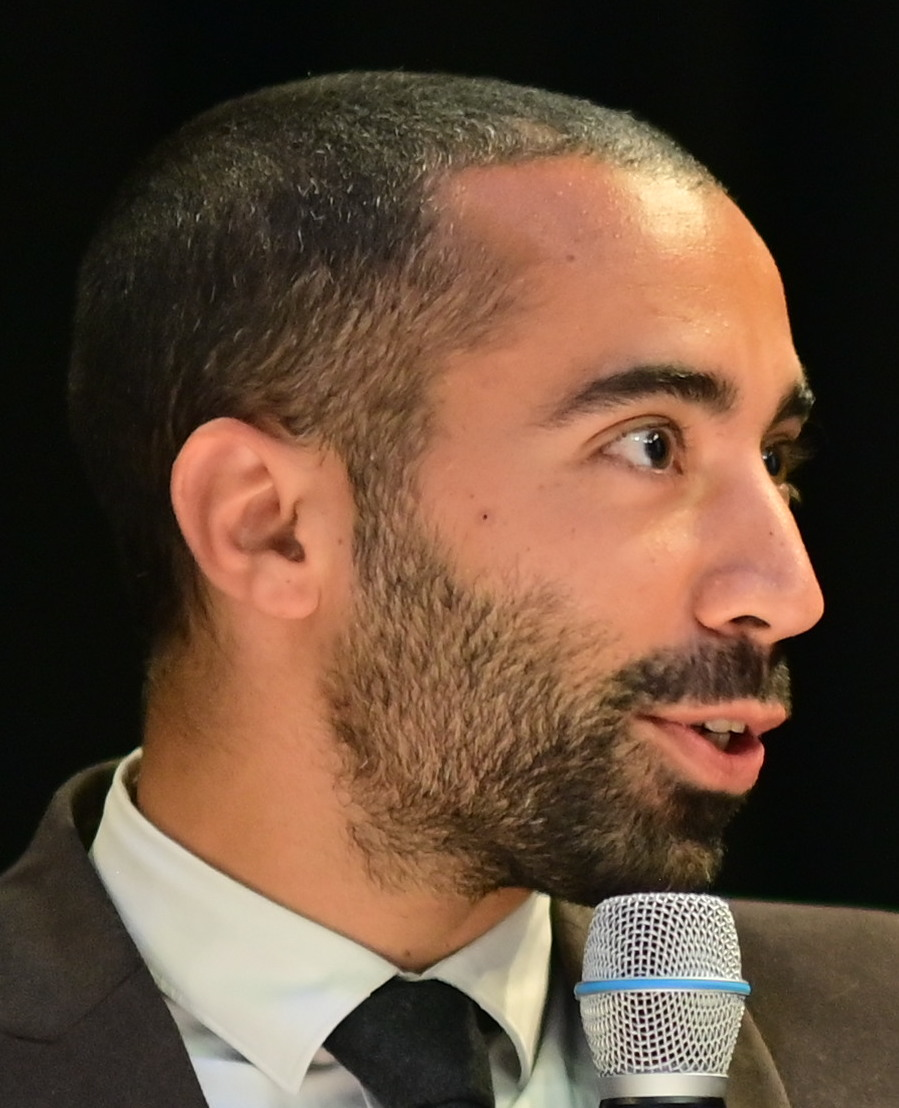

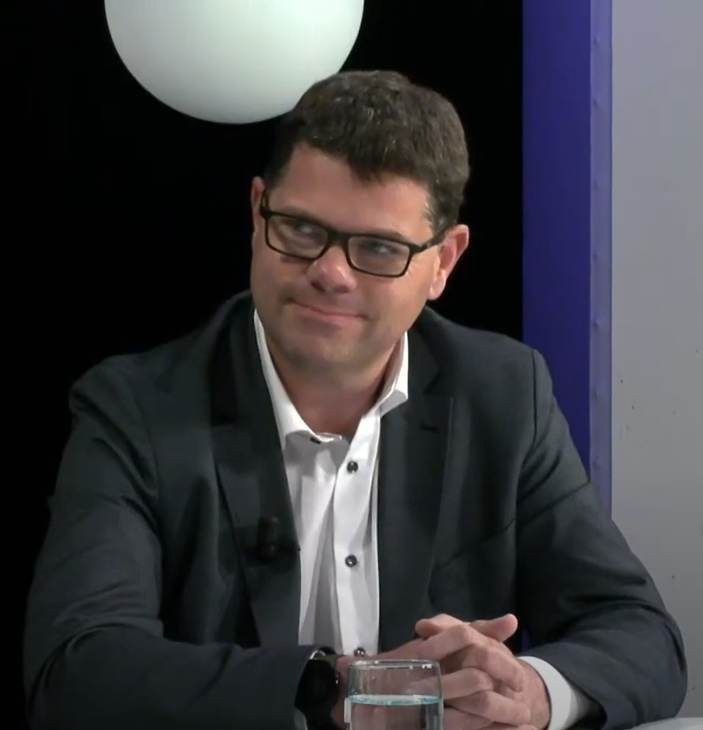

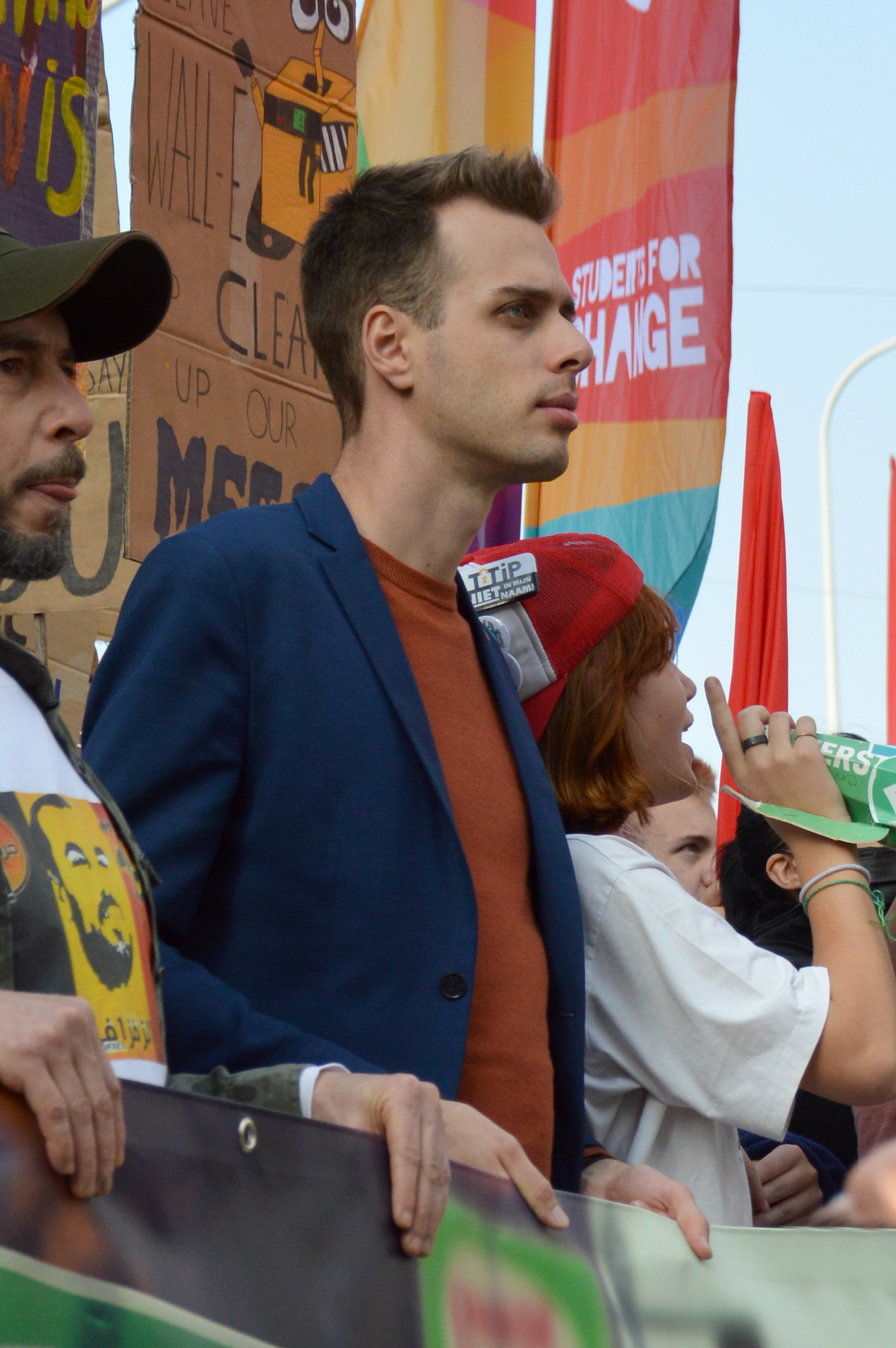

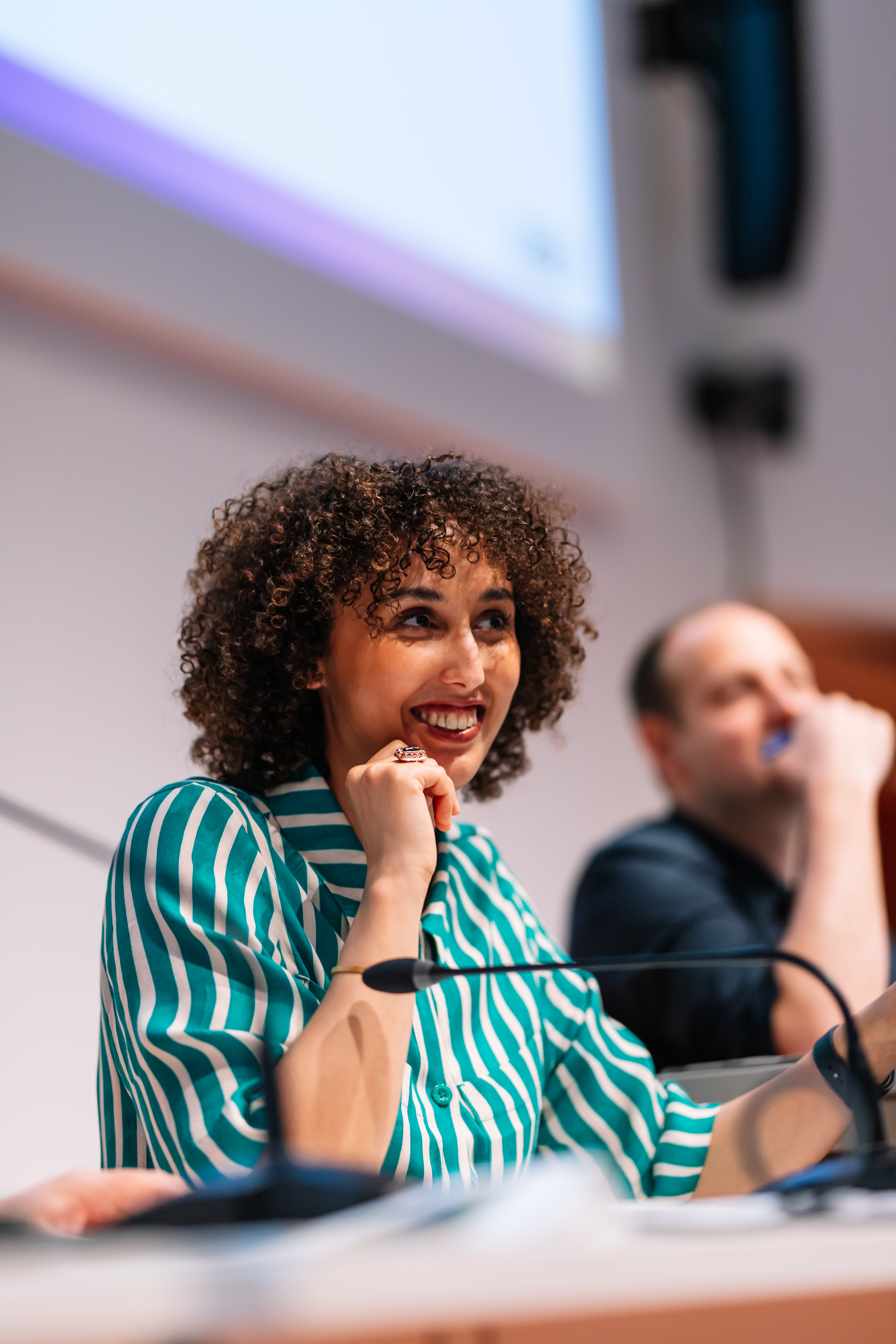

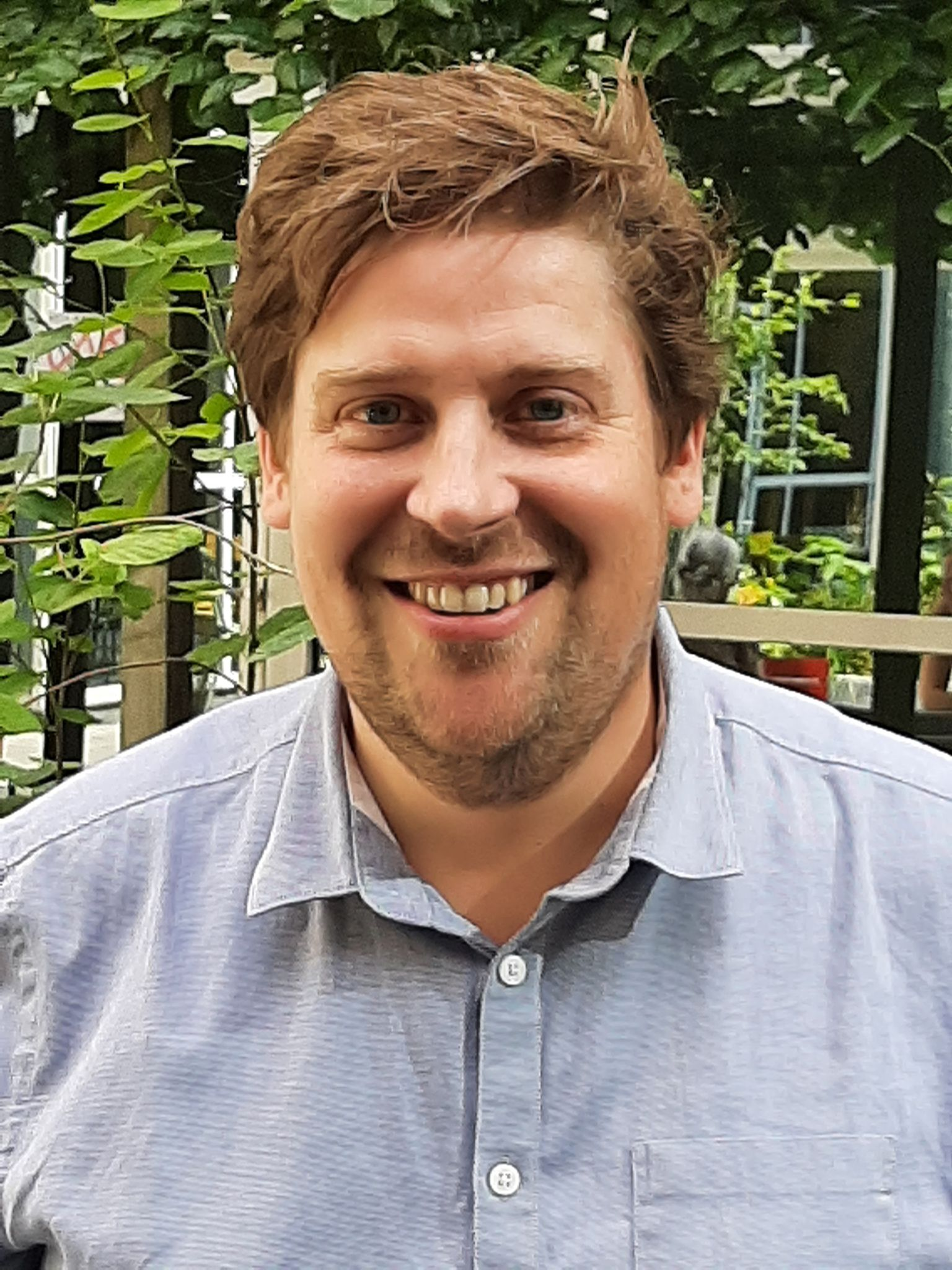
	First party	Second party	Third party
Leader	Bart De Wever	Tom Van Grieken	Melissa Depraetere
Party	N-VA	Vlaams Belang	Vooruit
Last election	35 seats, 24.8%	23 seats, 18.5%	13 seats, 10.3%
Seats won	31	31	18
Seat change	▼4	▲8	▲5
Popular vote	1,045,950	992,504	606,406
Percentage	23.88pp	22.66pp	13.85pp
Swing	▼0.94pp	▲4.17pp	▲3.71pp
	Fourth party	Fifth party	Sixth party
Leader	Sammy Mahdi	Tom Ongena	Jos D'Haese
Party	CD&V	Open Vld	PVDA-PTB
Last election	19 seats, 15.4%	16 seats, 13.1%	14 seats, 10.1%
Seats won	16	9	9
Seat change	▼3	▼7	▲5
Popular vote	571,137	364,609	364,070
Percentage	13.04pp	8.33pp	8.31pp
Swing	▼2.36pp	▼4.81pp	▲2.99pp
	Seventh party	Eighth party
Leader	Nadia Naji; Jeremie Vaneeckhout	Fouad Ahidar
Party	Groen	Team Fouad Ahidar
Last election	14 seats, 10.1%	New
Seats won	9	1
Seat change	▼5	New
Popular vote	319,396	14,187
Percentage	7.29	0.30pp
Swing	▼2.82pp	New
Flemish Government before election
Jambon Government
N-VA-CD&V-Open Vld coalition
Subsequent Flemish Government
Diependaele Government
N-VA-Vooruit-CD&V coalition

124 members of the Flemish Parliament will be elected. The five Flemish provinces (West Flanders, East Flanders, Antwerp, Flemish Brabant and Limburg) each were a constituency, plus the Brussels-Capital Region where those voting for a Dutch-language party could also vote in the Flemish election.

Every ten years, the 124 seats are reallocated among the six constituencies on the basis of population data. The Flemish Parliament approved the new distribution in December 2022, which removed a seat in West Flanders in favour of an extra seat in Flemish Brabant.

- Antwerp: 33 seats
- Brussels: 6 seats
- Limburg: 16 seats
- East Flanders: 27 seats
- Flemish Brabant: 21 seats (+1)
- West Flanders: 21 seats (-1)

The incumbent government is made up of a coalition of Flemish nationalists (N-VA), Christian democrats (CD&V) and liberals (Open Vld).

=== Main candidates ===
The following candidates are the first on the respective party list (lijsttrekker) per constituency.

Party	Antwerp	East Flanders	Flemish Brabant	Limburg	West Flanders	Brussels
CD&V	Katrien Schryvers	Nicole de Moor	Peter Van Rompuy	Jo Brouns	Hilde Crevits	Bianca Debaets
Groen	Kim Buyst	Mieke Schauvliege	Aimen Horch	Bright Adiyia	Jeremie Vaneeckhout	Nadia Naji
N-VA	Jan Jambon	Matthias Diependaele	Ben Weyts	Zuhal Demir	Sander Loones	Karl Vanlouwe
Open Vld	Tom Ongena	Stephanie D'Hose	Gwendolyn Rutten	Lydia Peeters	Jasper Pillen	Chloë Van Hoegaerden
PVDA	Jos D'Haese	Onno Vandewalle	Line De Witte	Gaby Colebunders	Ilona Vandenberghe	Anna Milojkowic
Vooruit	Caroline Gennez	Freya Van den Bossche	Bieke Verlinden	Kris Verduyckt	Pablo Annys	Hannelore Goeman
Vlaams Belang	Tom Van Grieken	Guy D'haeseleer	Klaas Slootmans	Chris Janssens	Immanuel De Reuse	Dominiek Lootens-Stael
Volt	Jeroen Van Loock		Richard Kelder			

Retiring incumbents:

- Mercedes Van Volcem (Open Vld)
- Willem-Frederik Schiltz (Open Vld)

=== Results ===
Party	Votes	%	+/–	Seats	+/–
New Flemish Alliance	1,045,950	23.88	-0.94	31	–4
Vlaams Belang	992,504	22.66	+4.17	31	+8
Vooruit	606,406	13.85	+3.71	18	+5
Christian Democratic and Flemish	571,137	13.04	-2.36	16	–3
Open Flemish Liberals and Democrats	364,609	8.33	-4.81	9	–7
Workers' Party of Belgium	364,070	8.31	+2.99	9	+5
Groen	319,396	7.29	-2.82	9	–5
Voor U	45,196	1.03	New	0	New
Union des Francophones	20,452	0.47	-0.21	0	0
Team Fouad Ahidar	14,187	0.32	New	1	New
Farmer–Citizen Interests	13,033	0.30	+0.30	0	0
DierAnimal	8,485	0.19	-0.68	0	0
Volt Europa	7,678	0.18	+0.18	0	0
Partij voor de Bomen	3,771	0.09	New	0	New
L99	2,566	0.06	New	0	New
Total	4,379,440	100.00	–	124	–
Valid votes	4,379,440	95.30			
Invalid/blank votes	216,121	4.70			
Total votes	4,595,561	100.00			
Registered voters/turnout	4,913,718	93.53			
Source: IBZ

== Walloon Parliament ==
2024 Walloon parliamentary election
- 9 June 2024

All 75 seats in the Walloon Parliament 38 seats needed for a majority
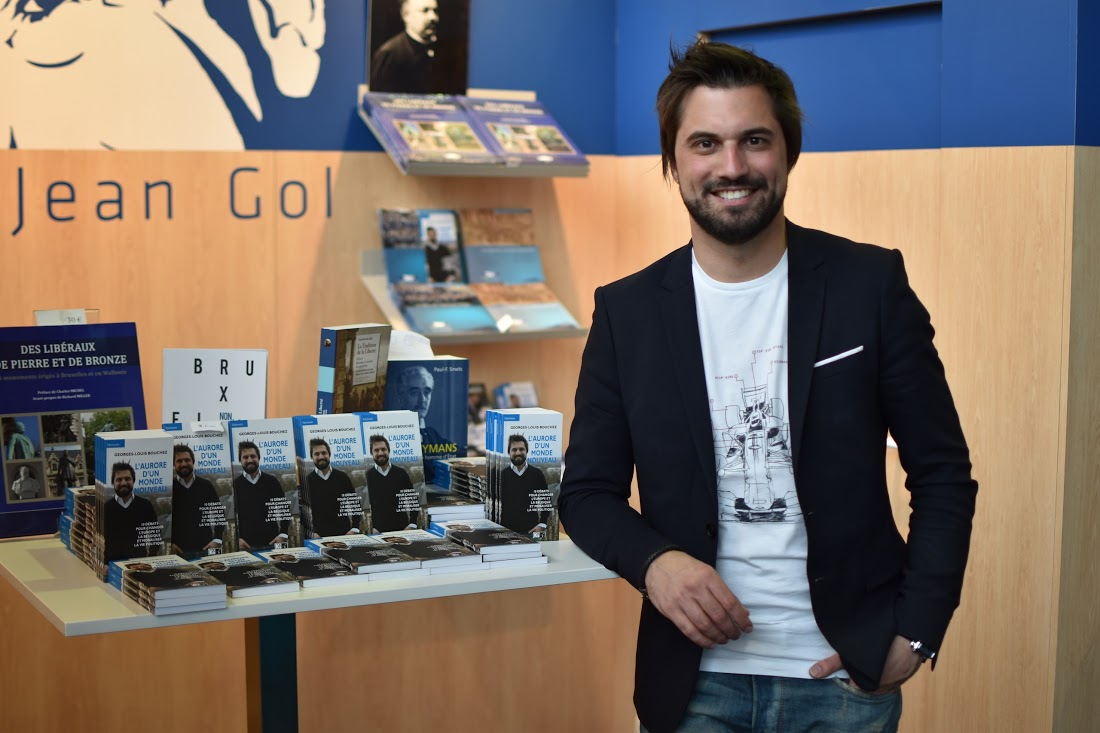

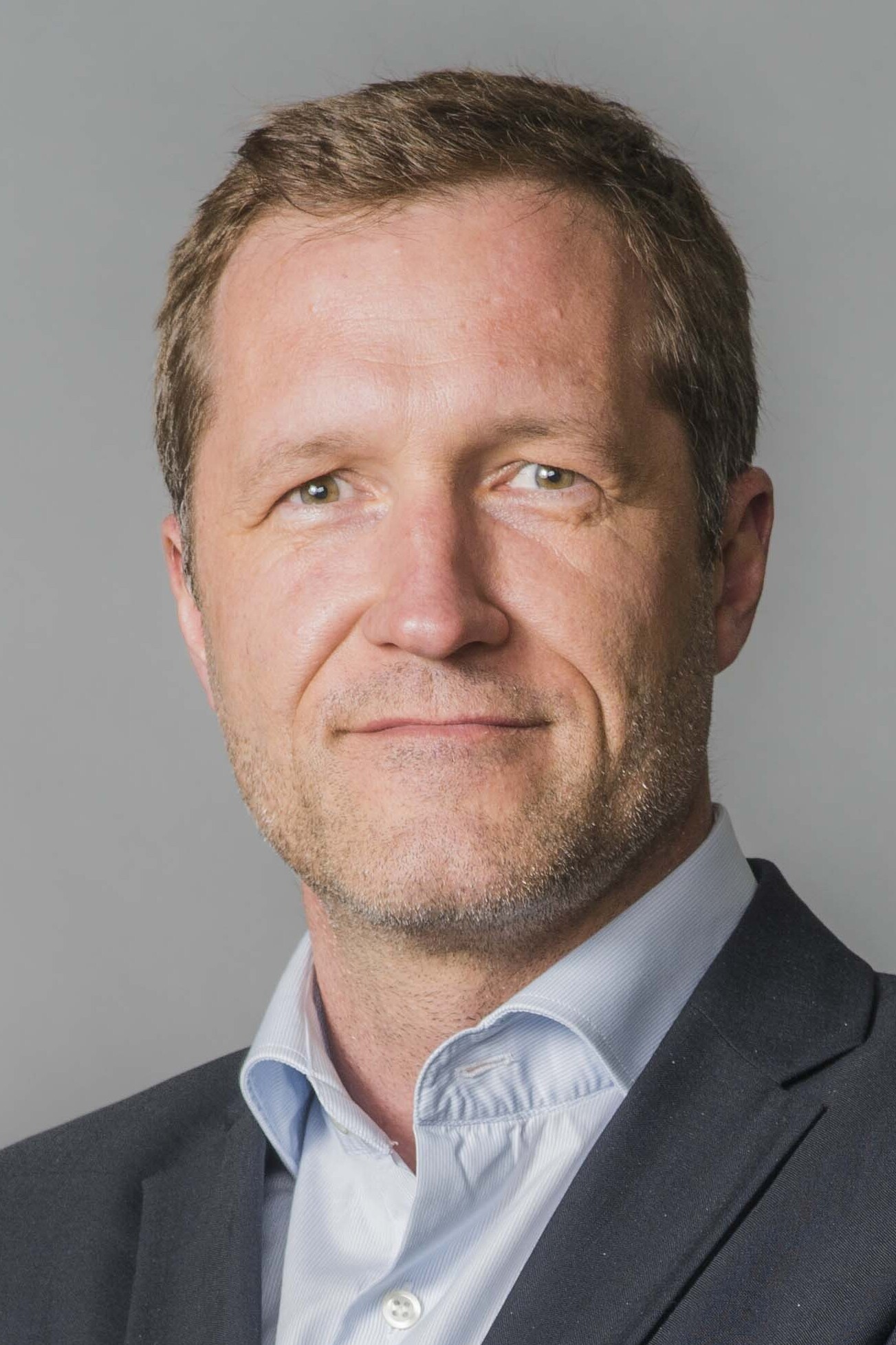

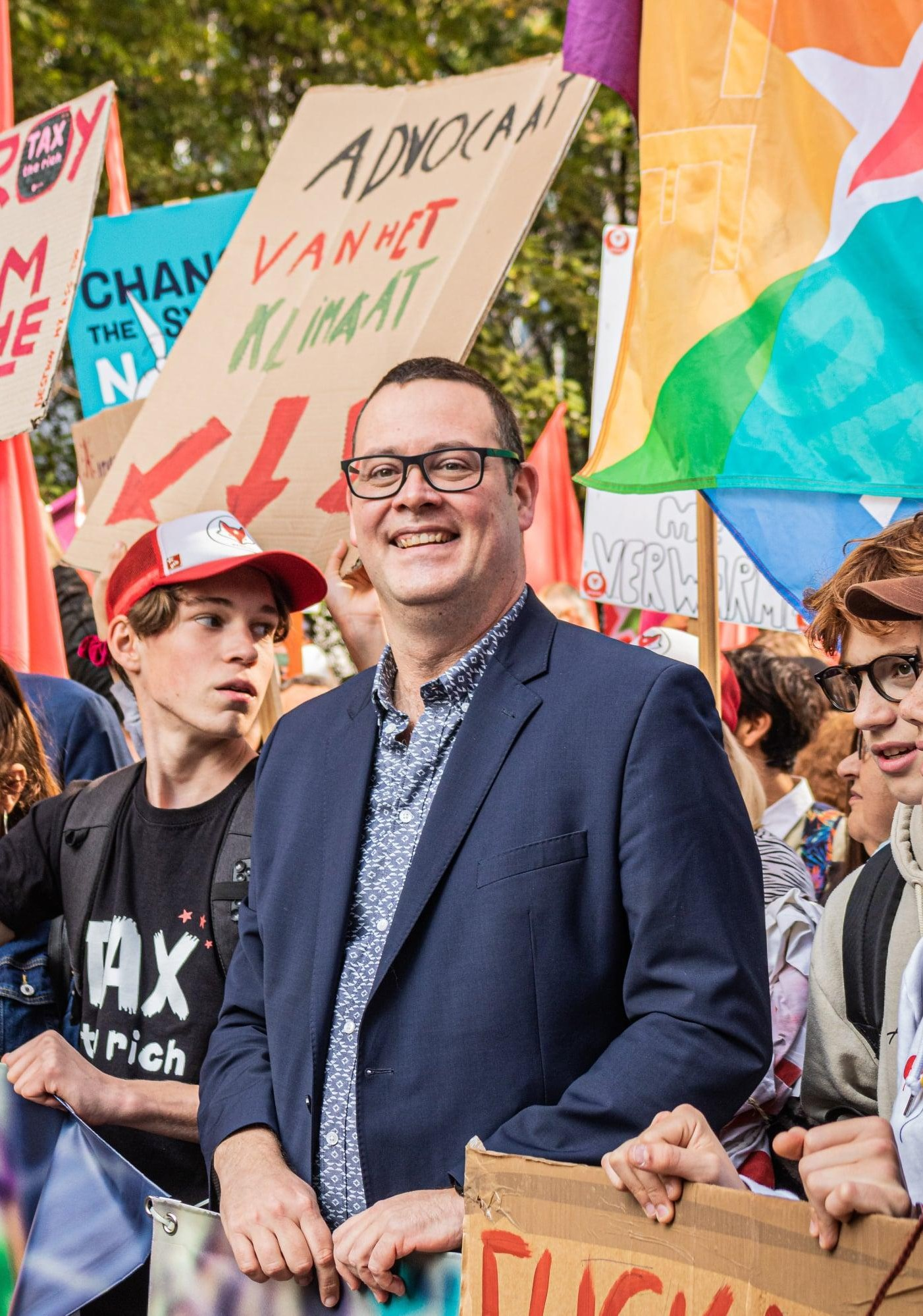

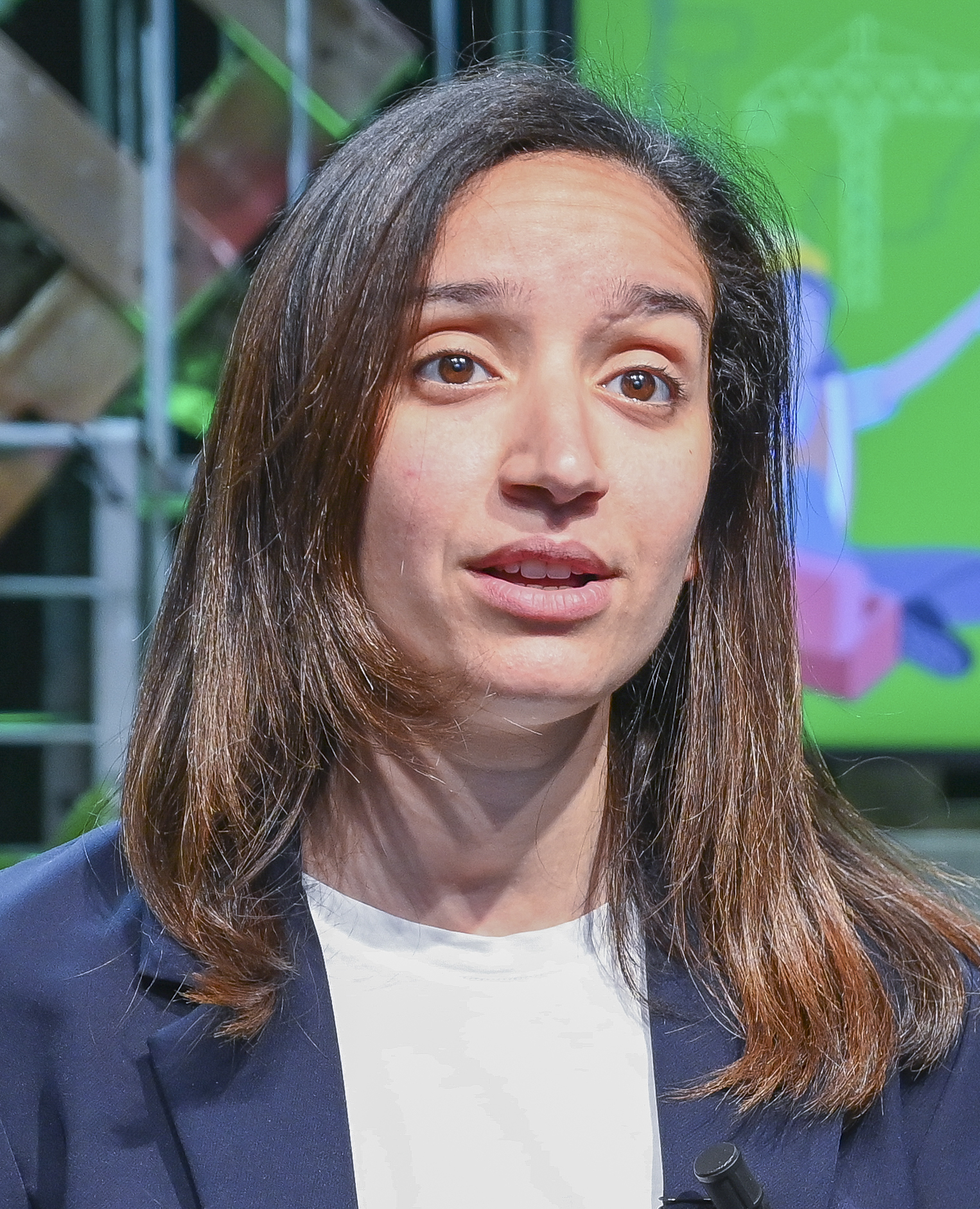

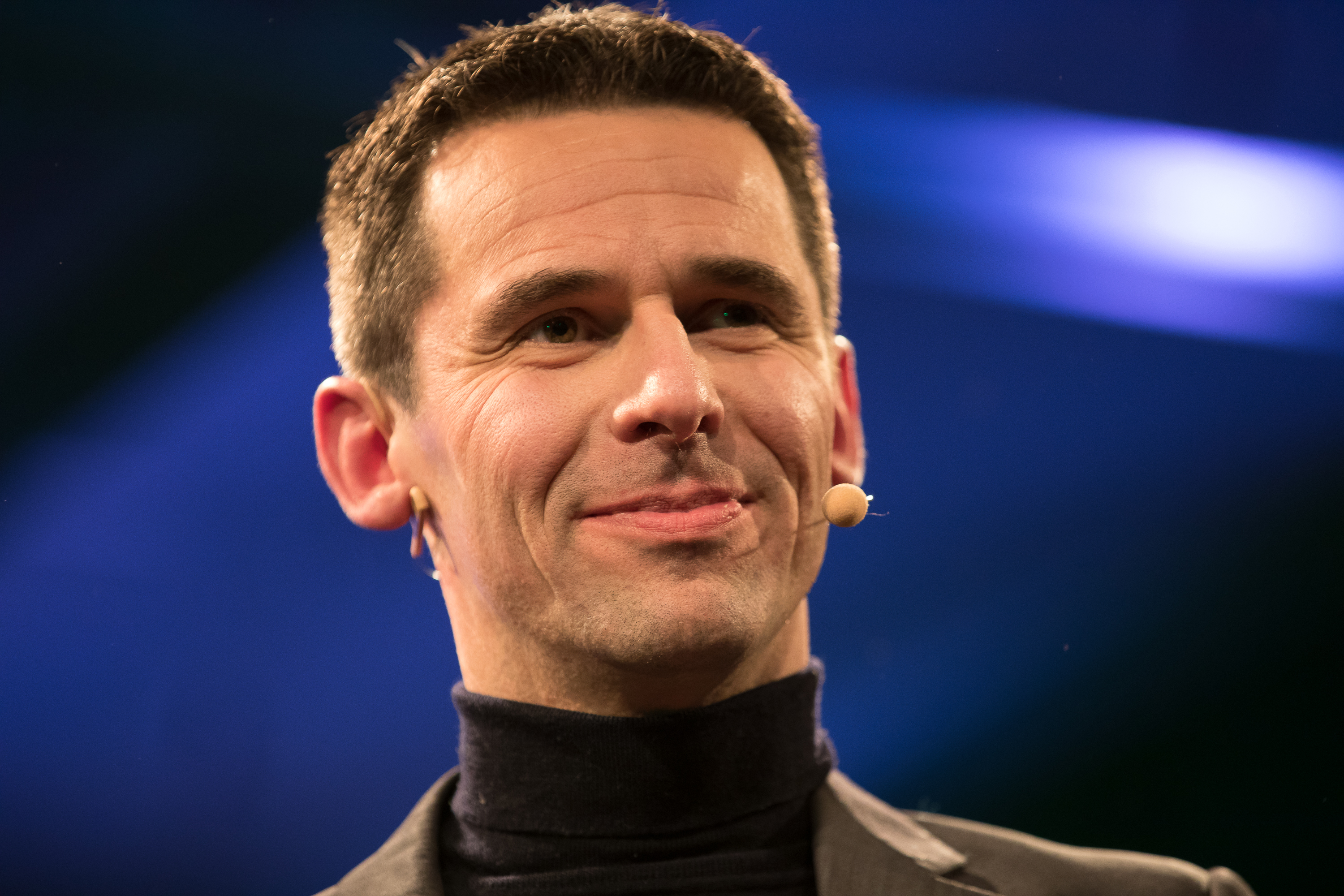
	First party	Second party	Third party
Leader	Georges-Louis Bouchez	Paul Magnette	Maxime Prévot
Party	MR	PS	LE
Last election	20 seats, 21.4%	23 seats, 26.2%	New
Seats won	26	19	17
Seat change	▲6	▼4	New
Popular vote	612,010	480,003	427,167
Percentage	29.61pp	23.22pp	20.66pp
Swing	▲8.19pp	▼2.95pp	New
	Fourth party	Fifth party
Leader	Raoul Hedebouw	Rajae Maouane; Jean-Marc Nollet
Party	PVDA-PTB	Ecolo
Last election	10 seats, 13.7%	12 seats, 14.5%
Seats won	8	5
Seat change	▼2	▼7
Popular vote	250,146	144,103
Percentage	12.10pp	6.97pp
Swing	▼1.58pp	▼7.51pp
Walloon Government before election
Di Rupo III Government
PS–MR–Ecolo coalition
Subsequent Walloon Government
Dolimont Government
MR–LE coalition

75 members of the Walloon Parliament are elected. The members are elected in multi-member arrondissement-based constituencies; the Walloon Parliament is the only parliament in Belgium still using this geographical level for constituencies.

The following candidates are the first on the respective party list (tête de liste) per constituency.

Party	Liège	Verviers	Huy-Waremme	Nivelles	Namur	Dinant - Philippeville	Luxembourg	Tournai - Ath - Mouscron	Charleroi - Thuin	Mons	Soignies
DéFI	Ivana Peterková	Coralie Clément	Grégory Vidal	Pascal Goergen	Amaury Alexandre	Bertrand Custinne	Daniel Schütz	Kathleen Delbecq	Jean-Noël Gillard	Nicolas Dubois	Huseyin Kurt
Ecolo	Veronica Cremasco	Freddy Mockel	Rodrigue Demeuse	Céline Tellier	Stéphane Hazée	Christina Dewart	Jean-Philippe Florent	Bénédicte Linard	Christophe Clersy	Charlotte De Jear	Arnaud Guérard
Les Engagés	Olivier de Wasseige	Jean-Paul Bastin	Marie Jacqmin	Vincent Blondel	Benoît Dispa	Christophe Bastin	François Huberty	Mathilde Vandorpe	Jean-Jacques Cloquet	Pascal Baurain	François Desquesnes
MR	Diana Nikolic	Charles Gardier	Caroline Cassart	Valérie De Bue	Vincent Maillen	Richard Fournaux	Willy Borsus	Marie-Christine Marghem	Adrien Dolimont	Jacqueline Galant	Maxime Daye
PS	Christie Morreale	Valérie Dejardin	Christophe Collignon	Anne Lambelin	Eliane Tillieux	Eddy Fontaine	Mélissa Hanus	Bruno Lefebvre	Thomas Dermine	Nicolas Martin	Laurent Devin
PTB	Alice Bernard	László Schonbrodt	Ruben Garcia Otero	Edwin Penninckx	Patricia Van Walle	Axelle Thirifays		Jori Dupont	Germain Mugemangango	John Beugnies	Amandine Pavet

=== Results ===
Party	Votes	%	+/–	Seats	+/–
Reformist Movement	612,490	29.61	+8.19	26	+6
Socialist Party	480,418	23.22	-2.95	19	–4
The Committed Ones	427,479	20.66	+9.66	17	+7
Workers' Party of Belgium	250,361	12.10	-1.58	8	–2
Ecolo	144,189	6.97	-7.51	5	–7
Chez Nous	58,565	2.83	+2.83	0	0
DéFI	55,794	2.70	-1.44	0	0
Citizen Collective	33,200	1.60	+0.29	0	0
Reprise en Main Citoyenne	6,270	0.30	New	0	0
Total	2,068,766	100.00	–	75	–
Valid votes	2,068,766	91.51			
Invalid/blank votes	191,923	8.49			
Total votes	2,260,689	100.00			
Registered voters/turnout	2,604,084	86.81			
Source: IBZ

== Brussels Parliament ==
All 89 members of the Parliament of the Brussels-Capital Region are elected. They are elected at-large, but there are separate Dutch-language party lists (electing 17 members) and French-language party lists (electing 72 members). Those voting for a Dutch-language party can also cast a vote for the Flemish Parliament election.

=== Results ===
Party	Votes	%	Seats	+/–
French language group
Reformist Movement	101,157	25.95	20	+7
Socialist Party	85,929	22.05	16	–1
Workers' Party of Belgium	81,542	20.92	15	+5
The Committed Ones	41,640	10.68	8	+2
Ecolo	38,386	9.85	7	–8
DéFI	31,614	8.11	6	–4
Citizen Collective	5,642	1.45	–	–
Volt Europa	1,531	0.39	–	–
Transparence	1,282	0.33	–	–
Plan B	1,038	0.27	–	–
Total	389,761	100.00	72	–
Dutch language group
Groen	18,345	22.82	4	0
Team Fouad Ahidar	13,242	16.47	3	New
New Flemish Alliance	9,571	11.91	2	–1
Open Flemish Liberals and Democrats	8,537	10.62	2	–1
Vlaams Belang	8,475	10.54	2	+1
Vooruit	8,045	10.01	2	–1
Workers' Party of Belgium	5,619	6.99	1	0
Christian Democratic and Flemish	5,102	6.35	1	0
Viva Palestina	1,944	2.42	0	New
Voor U	930	1.16	–	–
Volt Europa	569	0.71	–	–
Total	80,379	100.00	17	–
Valid votes	470,140	93.89		
Invalid/blank votes	30,619	6.11		
Total votes	500,759	100.00		
Registered voters/turnout	597,149	83.86		
Source: IBZ

== German-speaking Community Parliament ==
All 25 members of the Parliament of the German-speaking Community are elected in one constituency (at-large).

=== Results ===
Party	Votes	%	+/–	Seats	+/–
ProDG	11,654	29.10	+5.77	8	+2
Christian Social Party	7,920	19.78	–3.36	5	–1
Vivant	5,700	14.23	–0.58	4	+1
Socialist Party	5,473	13.67	–1.18	3	–1
Perspectives. Freedom. Progress.	4,817	12.03	+0.67	3	0
Ecolo	3,644	9.10	–3.41	2	–1
Huppertz+Co	666	1.66	New	0	New
Liste24.dg	173	0.43	New	0	New
Total	40,047	100.00	–	25	–
Valid votes	40,047	92.29			
Invalid/blank votes	3,346	7.71			
Total votes	43,393	100.00			
Registered voters/turnout	49,652	87.39			
Source: IBZ
