= List of members of the Walloon Parliament, 2024–2029 =

This is a list of members of the Walloon Parliament during the 2024–2029 legislative session, arranged alphabetically.

== Composition ==
=== 2024– ===
Party	Seats
Reformist Movement; Mouvement Réformateur (MR)	26
Socialist Party; Parti Socialiste (PS)	19
The Committed Ones; Les Engagés (LE)	17
Workers' Party of Belgium; Parti du travail de Belgique (PTB)	8
Confederated Ecologists; Ecolo (ECOLO)	5
Total	75

== Bureau ==
Office	Senator	Party
President	Willy Borsus	MR
1st Vice President	Laurent Devin	PS
2nd Vice President	Anne-Catherine Goffinet	LE
1st Secretary	Phillipe Dodrimont	MR
2nd Secretary	Melissa Hanus	PS
3rd Secretary	Stéphanie Thoron	MR
4th Secretary	Olivier de Wasseige	LE

== List of members (75) ==
Caucus Presidents in Bold

Member of Parliament	Affiliation	Constituency
Valerie Bluge	MR	Liège
Willy Borsus	MR	Arlon-Marche-en-Famenne-Bastogne-Neufchâteau-Virton
Caroline Cassart Mailleux	MR	Huy-Warremme
Tanguy Dardenne	MR	Charleroi-Thuin
Maxime Day	MR	Soignies-La Louvière
**Valerie de Bue**	MR	Nivelles
Arnaud Dewez	MR	Liège
Philippe Dodrimont	MR	Liège
Yves Edvard	MR	Arlon-Marche-en-Famenne-Bastogne-Neufchâteau-Virton
Richard Fournaux	MR	Dinant-Philippeville
Charles Guardian	MR	Verviers
Nicolas Janses	MR	Nivelles
Anne Laffut	MR	Arlon-Marche-en-Famenne-Bastogne-Neufchâteau-Virton
Vincent Maillen	MR	Namur
Marie-Christine Marghem	MR	Tournai-Ath-Mouscron
Olivier Maroy	MR	Nivelles
Chris Massaki Mbaki	MR	Mons
Christine Mauel	MR	Verviers
Diana Nikolic	MR	Liège
Vincent Palmero	MR	Tournai-Ath-Mouscron
Guillaume Soupart	MR	Mons
Caroline Teaser	MR	Charleroi-Thuin
Stephanie Thoron	MR	Namur
Nicolas Tzenetatos	MR	Charleroi-Thuin
Jean-Paul Wahl	MR	Nivelles
Valerie Warzee Caverenne	MR	Dinant-Philippeville
Christophe Collignon	PS	Huy-Warremme
Dorothée de Rodder	PS	Tournai-Ath-Mouscron
Valeria Dejardin	PS	Verviers
Laurent Devin	PS	Soignies-La Louvière
Eddy Fountain	PS	Dinant-Philippeville
Isabella Greco	PS	Charleroi-Thuin
Melissa Hanus	PS	Arlon-Marche-en-Famenne-Bastogne-Neufchâteau-Virton
Anne Lambelin	PS	Nivelles
Bruno Lefrebvre	PS	Tournai-Ath-Mouscron
Jean-Pierre Lepine	PS	Mons
Nicolas Martin	PS	Mons
**Christie Morreale**	PS	Liège
Ozlem Ozen	PS	Charleroi-Thuin
Sophie Pécriaux	PS	Soignies-La Louvière
Sabine Roberty	PS	Liège
Mourad Sahli	PS	Charleroi-Thuin
Patrick Spies	PS	Verviers
Elaine Teilieux	PS	Namur
Thierry Witsel	PS	Liège
Christophe Bastin	LE	Dinant-Philippeville
**Jean-Paul Bastin**	LE	Verviers
Pascal Baurain	LE	Mons
Vincent Blondel	LE	Nivelles
Olivier by Wasseige	LE	Liège
Jean-Jacques Cloquet	LE	Charleroi-Thuin
Caroline DeSalle	LE	Charleroi-Thuin
Benoît Dispa	LE	Namur
Sophie Fafchamps	LE	Liège
Anne-Catherine Goffinet	LE	Arlon-Marche-en-Famenne-Bastogne-Neufchâteau-Virton
Armelle Gysen	LE	Nivells
François Huberty	LE	Arlon-Marche-en-Famenne-Bastogne-Neufchâteau-Virton
Loïc Jacob	LE	Huy-Waremme
Marie Jacqmin	LE	Huy-Waremme
Genevieve Lazaron	LE	Namur
Loris Resinelli	LE	Soignies-La Louvière
Mathilde Vandorpe	LE	Tournai-Ath-Mouscron
Rachida Ait Alouha	PTB	Liège
Jamila Ammi	PTB	Charleroi-Thuin
Alice Bernard	PTB	Liège
Jori Dupont	PTB	Tournai-Ath-Mouscron
Julien Liradelfo	PTB	Liège
**Germain Mugemangango**	PTB	Charleroi-Thuin
Amandine Pavet	PTB	Soignies-La Louvière
Patricia Van Walle	PTB	Namur
Veronica Cremasco	Ecolo	Liège
**Stephane Hazee**	Ecolo	Namur
Benedicte Linard	Ecolo	Tournai-Ath-Mouscron
Freddy Mockel	Ecolo	Verviers
Celine Tellier	Ecolo	Nivells

== Sources ==
- "Composition: Representatives" (in French). The Walloon Parliament.
- "Political groups" (in French). The Walloon Parliament.
