= List of members of the Parliament of the French Community, 2009–2014 =

This is a list of members of the Parliament of the French Community during the 2009–2014 legislative session, arranged alphabetically.

== Composition ==
Party	Walloon Parliament	Brussels Capital Region Parliament	Total
Socialist Party; Parti Socialiste (PS)	29	6	35
Reformist Movement; Mouvement Réformateur (MR)	19	4	23
Ecolo	14	4	18
Humanist Democratic Centre; Centre Démocrate Humaniste (cdH)	13	3	16
Francophone Democratic Federalists; Fédéralistes Démocrates Francophones (FDF)	–	2	2
Total	75	19	94

== List of members ==
← denotes replaced member serving as federal/regional/community minister or federal representative, or German-speaking member of Walloon Parliament

=== Members of the Walloon Parliament (75) ===
Member of Parliament	Affiliation
Hugues Bayet ← Paul Magnette	PS
Marc Bolland	PS
Christophe Collignon	PS
Michel Daerden ← Lenzini (2009–07/07/2010) ← Daerden	PS
Marc de Saint Moulin	PS
Christian Dupont	PS
Claude Eerdekens ← Tillieux	PS
Françoise Fassiaux-Looten	PS
Virginie Gonzalez (07/07/2010) ← [[Laurent Devin|Devin]] ← Furlan	PS
Catherine Houdart (07/07/2010) ← Di Rupo	PS
Jean-François Istasse ← [[Edmund Stoffels|Stoffels]]	PS
Joelle Kapompole	PS
Serdar Kilic ← Busquin	PS
Mauro Lenzini (07/07/2010) ← Fernandez Fernandez	PS
Jean-Charles Luperto	PS
Jean-Claude Maene ← [[Jean-Marc Delizée|Delizée]]	PS
Alain Onkelinx	PS
Sophie Pécriaux	PS
Sébastian Pirlot	PS
Annick Saudoyer	PS
Daniel Senesael ← Demotte	PS
Isabelle Simonis	PS
Malika Sonnet ← Courard	PS
Pierre Tachenion ← [[Didier Donfut|Donfut]]	PS
Muriel Targnion	PS
Graziana Trotta ← [[Eric Massin|Massin]]	PS
Léon Walry ← Flahaut	PS
Maggie Yerna ← Demeyer	PS
Olga Zrihen	PS
Anne Barzin	MR
Chantal Bertouille	MR
Yves Binon	MR
Willy Borsus	MR
Caroline Cassart-Mailleux	MR
Véronique Cornet	MR
Jean-Luc Crucke	MR
Sybille de Coster-Bauchau	MR
Christine Defraigne	MR
Philippe Dodrimont	MR
Hervé Jamar	MR
Pierre-Yves Jeholet	MR
Serge Kubla	MR
Richard Miller	MR
Gilles Mouyard	MR
Marcel Neven	MR
Florine Pary-Mille	MR
Florence Reuter	MR
Jean-Paul Wahl	MR
Marcel Cheron	Ecolo
Veronica Cremasco	Ecolo
Matthieu Daele	Ecolo
Xavier Desgain	Ecolo
Emmanuel Disabato	Ecolo
Patrick Dupriez	Ecolo
Emily Hoyos	Ecolo
Isabelle Meerhaeghe	Ecolo
Christian Noiret	Ecolo
Yves Reinkin ← Dethier-Neumann	Ecolo
Marianne Saenen	Ecolo
Olivier Saint Amand	Ecolo
Luc Tiberghien	Ecolo
Bernard Wesphael	Ecolo
André Bouchat ← Lutgen	cdH
Michel de Lamotte	cdH
Carlo Di Antonio ← Catherine Fonck	cdH
Marc Elsen ← Wathelet	cdH
Dimitri Fourny	cdH
Alfred Gadenne	cdH
Anne-Catherine Goffinet	cdH
Benoît Langendries ← Antoine	cdH
Michel Lebrun	cdH
Maxime Prévot	cdH
Véronique Salvi	cdH
Christine Servaes ← Simonet	cdH
Damien Yzerbyt	cdH

=== Members of the Parliament of the Brussels-Capital Region (19) ===
Member of Parliament	Affiliation
Mohammed Daïf	PS
Caroline Désir	PS
Bea Diallo	PS
Catherine Moureaux (07/07/2010–) ← Saïdi	PS
Eric Tomas	PS
Rudi Vervoort	PS
Jean-Claude Defossé	Ecolo
Zakia Khattabi (24/09/2009–) ← Nagy	Ecolo
Jacques Morel	Ecolo
Barbara Trachte ← Turine	Ecolo
Françoise Bertieaux	MR
Jacques Brotchi	MR
Alain Destexhe	MR
Françoise Schepmans	MR
Julie De Groote	cdH
André du Bus de Warnaffe ← Fremault	cdH
Pierre Migisha	cdH
Didier Gosuin	FDF
Caroline Persoons	FDF

== Sources ==
- "Composition: Representatives" (in French). The Walloon Parliament.
- "Political groups" (in French). The Walloon Parliament.

== See also ==
- List of members of the Parliament of the French Community, 2024-2029
