= Dolimont Government =

Walloon government formed in 2024

- Cabinet of Wallonia
- Incumbent
- Date formed: 15 July 2024

People and organisations
- Head of state: Philippe of Belgium
- Head of government: Adrien Dolimont
- No. of ministers: 8
- Member party: MR; Les Engagés
- Status in legislature: Coalition

History
- Predecessor: Di Rupo III

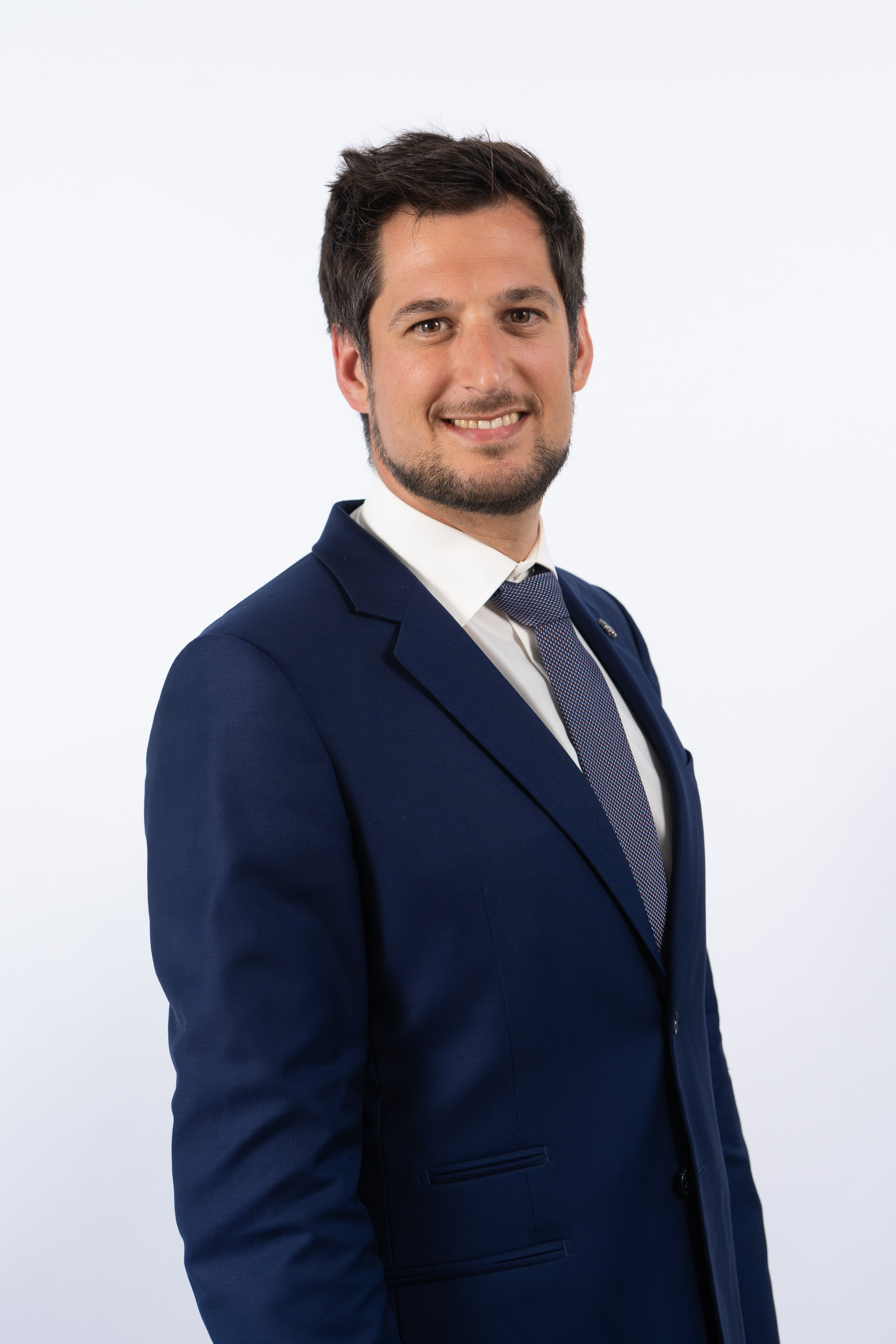
Minister-President Dolimont

The Dolimont Government (Gouvernement Dolimont) is the Walloon Government formed and sworn in on 15 July 2024, following the 2024 Belgian regional elections and replacing the III Di Rupo Government.

The Government was formed following the 2024 Belgian government formation consisting of parties Reformist Movement and Les Engagés, making up a majority of 43 seats in the 75 seat Walloon Parliament.

Reformist Movement ministers are Adrien Dolimont, Pierre-Yves Jeholet, Anne-Catherine Dalcq, Cécile Neven, and Jacqueline Galant. Les Engagés ministers are François Desquesnes, Valérie Lescrenier, and Yves Coppieters.

The main opposition parties are the Socialist Party (PS), the Workers' Party (PTB), and Ecolo.

== Composition ==
Walloon Government - Dolimont
Function	Name	Party
Minister-president; Minister of Budget, Finance, Animal Welfare, International Affairs, and Firearms Licenses	Adrien Dolimont	MR
Vice-President; Minister of Urban Planning, Public Works, Traffic Safety; and Local Affairs	François Desquesnes	LE
Vice-President; Minister of Economy and Employment	Pierre-Yves Jeholet	MR
Minister of Agriculture and Rural Affairs	Anne-Catherine Dalcq	MR
Minister of Energy, Air-Climate Plan, Housing and Airports	Cécile Neven	MR
Minister of Sports, Infrastructure, and Media	Jacqueline Galant	MR
Minister of Tourism, Heritage, Infrastructure, and Childcare	Valérie Lescrenier	LE
Minister of Health, Environment, Social Economy, Social Action, Fight against Poverty, Handicapped, and Families	Yves Coppieters	LE

== Formation ==
The results of the regional elections marked a shift of the Walloon Region to the right, with the victory of the Reformist Movement (MR) and the possibility for it to establish a centre-right majority with Les Engagés. While the “Rainbow coalition” that formed the outgoing government was mathematically renewable, it was politically ruled out following the decision of the Socialist Party to remain in opposition.

MR president Georges-Louis Bouchez and Les Engagés president Maxime Prévot announced on 11 June 2024 that they were launching negotiations aimed at forming a government between their two parties, which would hold an absolute majority. During the week of 18 June 2024, these discussions were marked by consultations with employers’ organisations and labour unions.

On 11 July 2024, Georges-Louis Bouchez and Maxime Prévot announced that an agreement had been reached to form an “azure coalition”. The coalition agreement was ratified two days later by liberal and social-liberal party members.

Outgoing Walloon Minister of Budget Adrien Dolimont was chosen on 14 July 2024 as the future Minister-President. At 35 years old at the time of his appointment, he became the youngest head of government in the history of the Walloon Region.
