= 2024–2025 Belgian government formation =

Following the 2024 Belgian federal and regional elections, Government formation talks began on 10 June. Incumbent Prime Minister Alexander De Croo announced his resignation and his party's leader Tom Ongena declared that Open Flemish Liberals and Democrats would not be a part of the next federal government.

Bart De Wever was sworn in as prime minister on 3 February 2025.

== Overview ==
Government		Outgoing coalition		Next coalition		Sworn in (days after election)
Belgium	Federal Government	De Croo	Flemish side CD&V; Open Vld; Vooruit; Groen; Francophone side PS; MR; Ecolo	De Wever	Flemish side N-VA; Vooruit; CD&V; Francophone side MR; LE	3 February 2025 (239 days)
Flanders	Flemish Government	Jambon	N-VA; CD&V; Open Vld	Diependaele	N-VA; Vooruit; CD&V	30 September 2024 (113 days)
Wallonia	French Community Government	Jeholet	PS; Ecolo; MR	Degryse	MR; LE	16 July 2024 (37 days)
Wallonia	Walloon Government	Di Rupo III	PS; Ecolo; MR	Dolimont	MR; LE	15 July 2024 (36 days)
Brussels-Capital Region	Brussels Government	Vervoort III	Flemish side Groen; Open Vld; Vooruit Francophone side PS; Ecolo; DéFI	Dilliès	Flemish side Groen; Anders; Vooruit; CD&V Francophone side MR; PS; LE	14 February 2026 (1 year, 250 days)
German Community in Belgium	German-speaking Community Govt.	Paasch II	ProDG; PFF; PS	Paasch III	ProDG; CSP; PFF	1 July 2024 (22 days)

== Federal government ==
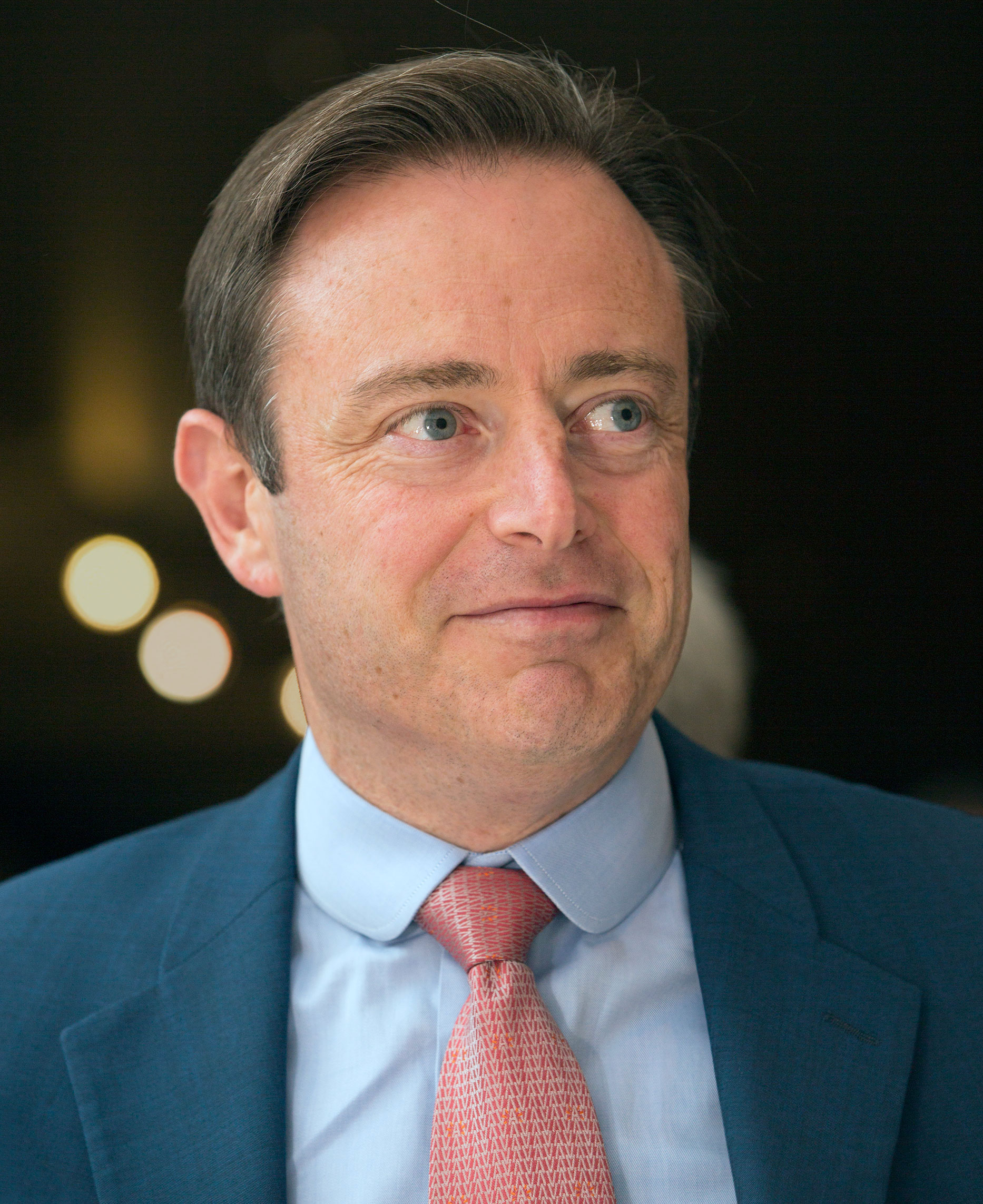
De Wever in 2014

According to political analysts, the most obvious federal coalition would consist of the right-wing New Flemish Alliance, Reformist Movement, and centre-left Vooruit, with the centrist Christian Democratic and Flemish and Les Engagés parties to reach at least 76 seats. Other coalitions are ruled out, following the decision of Open Vld, Groen and the Socialist Party to be part of the opposition. Vlaams Belang is not expected to be part of the government at any level, due to the cordon sanitaire.

On 12 June, after consulting with party presidents, King Philippe named N-VA leader Bart De Wever as informateur. He had to submit a report by 19 June. After said report was submitted, his mission as informateur was extended by another week until 26 June.

On 15 June, Melissa Depraetere, leader of Vooruit, declared that she did not wish Georges-Louis Bouchez, leader of MR, to be in the future government, citing his "disloyal" attitude towards the De Croo Government and his lack of proficiency in Dutch as factors that would harm a future coalition. She also declared that she desired to push a social design onto a future coalition that she notes is emerging to be on the right, which, in her eyes, will make negotiation very difficult.

On 21 June, Bart De Wever announced that he sees the only logical government formation to be the so-called "Arizona coalition" (N-VA - MR - LE - Vooruit - CD&V), which combines the respective parties negotiating in Flanders and Wallonia for the respective regional governments. The name derives from the colors of the respective parties all appearing on the flag of that US state. According to De Wever, any other attempt at government formation would lead to a period of endless negotiations. He specifies that the Arizona formation would allow for relative coherence on a socio-economic level, but that it would make any prospect of institutional reform more difficult to negotiate.

On 26 June, De Wever submitted his second report to the King as informateur, subsequently he was relieved of informateur duties and was appointed as preformateur. The choice to appoint a preformateur was analysed by political commentators as confirmation of an incoming Arizona coalition government, but simultaneously an admission that the differences between the parties needed to form government are still too vast for quick and easy negotiations and that a government is not imminent.

On 10 July, the king officially appointed De Wever as formateur, giving him the ability to start formal talks to assemble a government, and likely becoming prime minister of the resulting government. The government was expected to consist of the Arizona coalition, including the N-VA, CD&V, and Vooruit on the Flemish side, and MR and Les Engagés on the Francophone side. His assignment was extended on 24 July and 19 August.

On 22 August, De Wever returned his assignment to the king, having failed to produce a deal agreed by all parties. The next day, the king would assign Les Engagés leader Maxime Prévot as the mediator in the second round of negotiations.

On 1 September, King Philippe again appointed Bart De Wever as the mediator in the coalition negotiations.

On 5 September, De Wever summoned the five Arizona parties for the first time to make working agreements on the further course of the negotiations. It was agreed that the five Arizona parties would not vote on bills that had a budgetary impact after the start of the parliamentary year. It was also decided that the thematic working groups on the various policy themes launched earlier would resume their work from Monday 9 September. The central negotiators met weekly from 13 September to review the progress in the working groups.

On 23 September, De Wever's assignment as formateur was extended until 17 October. After the local elections on Sunday 13 October, in which the five Arizona parties emerged stronger, the formateur invited the federal chief negotiators on 16 October to determine the working method and agenda for the negotiations on the major sticking points that still needed to be addressed, in particular the substantial savings of 28 billion euros and the socio-economic reforms that had previously failed to negotiate. It was decided that the sherpas, the technical advisors, of the parties would formulate comments on a new socio-economic supernote that the formateur delivered to the five parties on 8 October. A day later, De Wever's assignment as formateur was extended again by the king, this time until 4 November, with the message to conclude the negotiations within a reasonable period of time.

During a new joint meeting of the central negotiators on 24 October, it was agreed that De Wever would draw up a new supernote, after the various parties had requested a considerable number of adjustments. The intention was that the negotiators would further deal with the remaining sticking points of the other policy themes during the autumn break the following week, but Vooruit announced in a statement later that day that it wanted to wait until the formateur had presented his new supernote with accompanying budgetary tables. According to the party, there was little point in concluding partial agreements on the other themes without a budgetary framework. The other parties regretted Vooruit's move and called for negotiations to be resumed as soon as possible. On 29 October, Bart De Wever presented his revised supernote to the party chairmen of Vooruit, MR, CD&V and Les Engagés separately, after which the technicians of the parties considered the note a day later. On 31 October, a joint meeting of the negotiators of the five parties followed to discuss the note. However, no progress was made again: four of the five parties were prepared to continue negotiations on the basis of this note, but Vooruit still found it too unbalanced, particularly with regard to tackling the budget.

In an attempt to straighten things out, De Wever held bilateral consultations with the chairmen of the Arizona parties on Sunday 3 November. The next morning, a joint meeting with the five chairmen followed, before the formateur had to go to the King to report on his assignment. However, this was not enough to break the impasse, after which De Wever offered his resignation as formateur at the Palace. King Philippe, however, kept the resignation under consideration and gave De Wever until 12 November to hold further consultations with the Arizona parties, so that the parties could come closer together again to resume government negotiations.

On 31 January 2025, a governmental agreement was reached between the Arizona parties, with De Wever sworn in as prime minister on 3 February 2025.

=== Possible coalitions ===
Sorted descending by number of total seats:

Coalition	Coalition parties		Total number of seats	Flemish seats	Francophone seats	Pitfalls
Coalition	Flemish	Francophone	Total number of seats	Flemish seats	Francophone seats	Pitfalls
Vivaldi incl. LE	Vooruit + CD&V + Open Vld + Groen	MR + PS + LE + Ecolo	90 / 150	37 / 89	53 / 61	Extension of the outgoing coalition strengthened by LE. Broad coalition which is a minority on Flemish side. Open Vld and PS both decided to remain in opposition. PS needed for majority.
Arizona excl. PS & Open Vld	N-VA + Vooruit + CD&V	MR + LE	82 / 150	48 / 89	34 / 61	Vast political differences in opinion between largest (N-VA) and second largest (Vooruit) Flemish parties. Vooruit president Melissa Depraetere has stated that her party may refuse to be part of a government including MR president George-Louis Bouchez, citing issues with his "disloyalty" to the incumbent Vivaldi government.

Other coalitions are also mathematically possible, but in practice unlikely. For instance: both the PS and Open Vld had announced in the beginning of the formation that they preferred to remain in the opposition, while extremist parties on both sides (left: Workers' Party of Belgium, right: Vlaams Belang) are unlikely to be part of the government due to vetoes by other parties.

== Flemish government ==
The 2024 regional election saw the decline of Open Vld, Groen, CD&V, and N-VA, with an increase of votes for Vooruit, PVDA and VB. The incumbent government lost its majority, with only 56 out of 124 seats. Alongside the decisions of Open Vld and Groen to remain in opposition, this means the only possible majority government formation without breaking the cordon sanitaire with VB is a tripartite coalition featuring N-VA, Vooruit, and CD&V, which would have a majority at 65 out of 124 seats.

On 14 June, following talks with Sammy Mahdi of CD&V and Melissa Depraetere of Vooruit, Bart De Wever announced that he would draft a preliminary memorandum before negotiations began between the three parties.

On 19 June, Matthias Diependaele of N-VA was called upon to form government on the regional level, with Vooruit and CD&V announcing they are ready to begin negotiations. He will be assisted in the formation proceedings by Zuhal Demir, Ben Weyts, and Annick De Ridder. Several months later, on 28 September 2024, the three parties announced to have come to an agreement to form a new Flemish Government: the Diependaele Government.

== Walloon government ==
The regional election saw a victory for the right-leaning bloc of MR and Les Engagés, to the detriment of the PS, Ecolo, and PTB. While the incumbent government's so-called "rainbow coalition" is still mathematically possible, with its majority being held at 50 out of 75 seats, it has been deemed impossible due to PS's decision to remain in opposition. On 11 June, two days after the election, Maxime Prévot and Georges-Louis Bouchez announced their intent to launch negotiations to form a two-party majority government of MR and LE, with 43 out of 75 seats.

On 18 June, consultations began with different organisations, beginning with employers' organisations including VOKA, representing Flemish employers, followed by talks with the unions.

On 11 July, MR and LE announced that they had agreed to form a new government and presented the outlines of this new agreement, which involved lowering taxes, removing the budget deficit by 2034, reducing the number of ministers and eventually dissolving the provinces, tackling unemployment, creating more places in child care and prohibiting smart phones in schools for children up to 12 years old. The names of the ministers were not yet decided and will follow in the coming days.

== Brussels-Capital Region government ==
On the Francophone side, the election saw the rise of MR, PTB, and (more modestly) of LE (formerly CdH). Ecolo and Défi lost about half their seats while PS managed to hold on despite a slight decline.

On the Dutch-speaking side, N-VA, Open Vld, and Vooruit each lost a seat while Groen remained stable and VB gained one. The real upheaval was on the side of Team Fouad Ahidar, a new party launched by Fouad Ahidar, a former Brussels MP for Vooruit, which has been characterised by the importance it gives to the "defence of the Muslim community" and religious values. The party obtained 3 seats and became the second-largest Dutch-speaking political party in Brussels.

The incumbent government is not renewable, having lost its overall majority at only 37 out of 89 seats, as well as both of its language-specific majorities, with only 29 out of the 72 Francophone seats (compared to its previous 42) and only 8 out of 17 Dutch-speaking seats (compared to its previous 11). Open Vld and Ecolo have also announced their intentions to remain in opposition. Although Paul Magnette, federal leader of PS, announced his intentions for the party to stay in opposition at all levels, Ahmed Laaouej, head of the party list at the regional level, declared that the regional branch of the party is ready to be part of a regional majority government. On 11 June, MR and LE declared that they were joining forces to carry out negotiations in Brussels.

The establishment of a government poses several issues. Firstly, with MR and Groen are essential to their respective linguistic colleges, however, MR's desire to get rid of the "Good Move" plan put in place by Groen in the previous government arouses tensions between Georges-Louis Bouchez and Elke Van den Brandt, even before the start of negotiations. Therefore, Team Fouad Ahidar proves to be necessary to form a three-way Dutch-speaking majority coalition (in the case of a fourth party joining the coalition, one would have to decline a ministerial post), however, Ahidar's political line is controversial, with Guy Vanhengel of Open Vld accusing the party of being "focused on sharia".

== German-speaking Community government ==
The election saw a great victory for the Christian democratic and liberal ProDG which gained 2 seats, and a gain of a single seat was also seen by the liberal Vivant. All other political parties saw a loss of a single seat except for the conservative-liberal Perspectives. Freedom. Progress. (PFF), which remained stable at 3 seats. The incumbent government was potentially renewable, as it retained its majority with 14 out of 25 seats. However, on 13 June, just 4 days after the election, it was announced that ProDG, the Christian Social Party (CSP) and PFF had finalised a coalition agreement and that Oliver Paasch would be Minister-President of the German-speaking Community for a third consecutive term, with a majority of 16 out of the 25 seats in the Parliament. This is a historic change in government, putting the Socialist Party (SP) into opposition for the first time since 1990, with the Christian democrats returning to government for the first time in 25 years.
