= 2024 Belgian elections =

Set index article

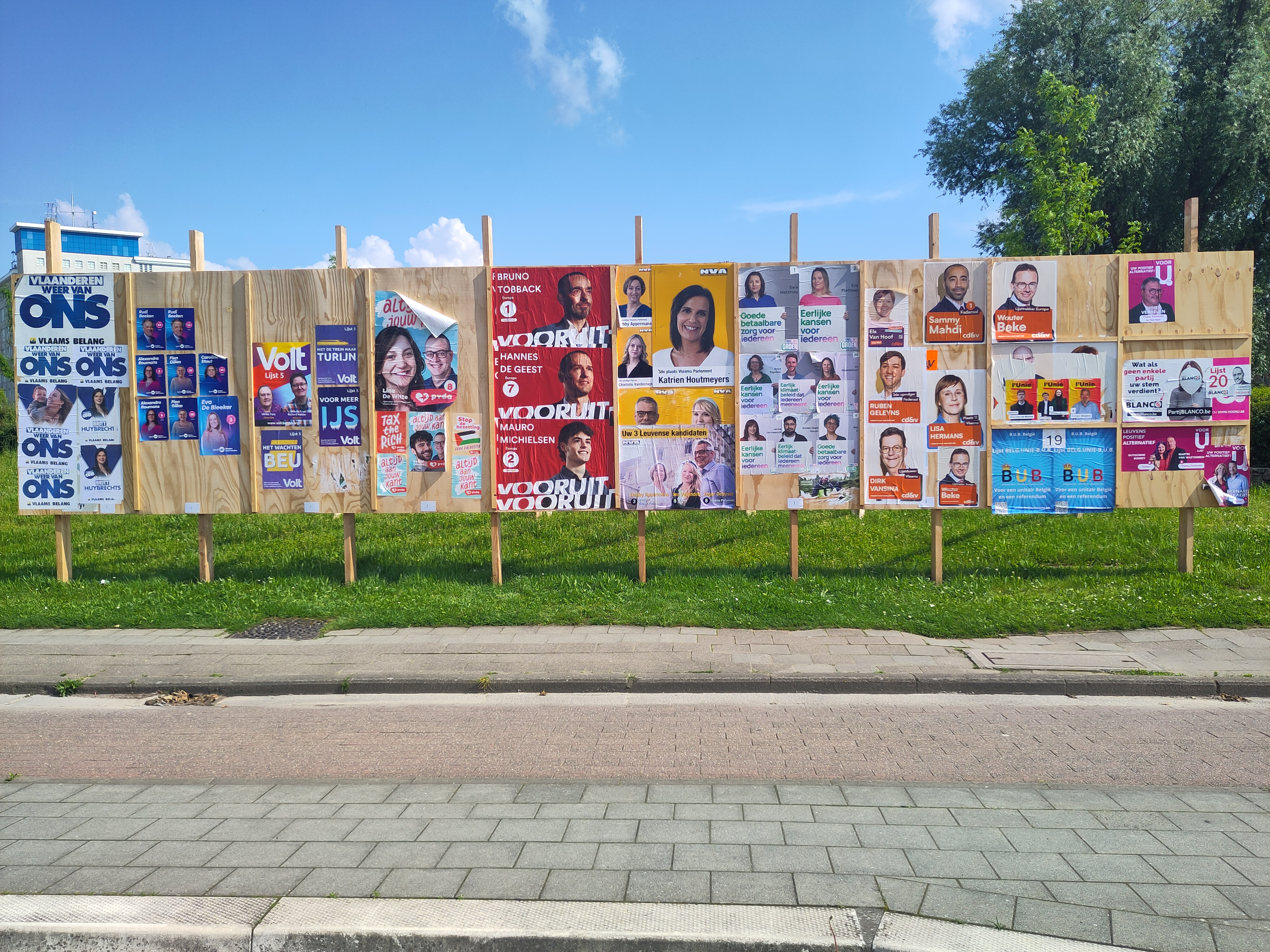
Election posters in Leuven for the elections of 9 June 2024

The 2024 Belgian elections took place on 9 June 2024 and 13 October 2024.

Following elections were held on 9 June 2024:

- The election for the Chamber of Representatives
- The election for the 22 Belgian seats to the European Parliament
- The election for the Flemish Parliament
- The election for the Parliament of Wallonia
- The election for the Parliament of the Brussels-Capital Region

Following elections were held on 13 October 2024:

- The 2024 Belgian provincial election
- The 2024 Belgian municipal election
- The 2024 Belgian district election

== Parties ==
Traditionally Belgian parties belong to different families based on their multilingual predecessors which split in the 1970s and usually sit in the same political groups of the European Parliament and in the Benelux Parliament

Family	Dutch-speaking	French-speaking	German-speaking
Social democratic	Forward	Socialist Party (PS)	Socialist Party (SP)
Liberal	Open Flemish Liberals and Democrats (Open VLD)	Reformist Movement (MR)	Perspectives. Freedom. Progress. (PFF)
Green	Green	Ecolo	
Christian democratic	Christian Democratic & Flemish (cd&v)	The Committed Ones (LE) (Note: LE broke with their christian democratic tradition on 17 March 2022)	Christian Social Party (CSP)
Far-right	Flemish Interests (VB)	At our place (CN) (Note: CN and VB do not have a common history but have deep ties to another and can be seen as counterparts.)	
Marxist	Workers' Party of Belgium/Labour Party of Belgium (PTB/PVDA) (Note: PTB/PVDA are the only fully national major party in Belgium.)		
Other	New Flemish Alliance (N-VA)	DéFI	Pro German-speaking Community (ProDG)
Other	New Flemish Alliance (N-VA)	DéFI	Vivant
