= List of protected heritage sites in Jurbise =

This table shows an overview of the protected heritage sites in the Walloon town Jurbise. This list is part of Belgium's national heritage.

Object	Year/architect	Town/section	Address	Coordinates	Number^{?}	Image
Spijkereik and chapel of Saint-Antoine de Padoue ^{(nl)} ^{(fr)}		Jurbeke		50.537961°N 3.874552°E	53044-CLT-0003-01 Info	Spijkereik en kapel Saint-Antoine de Padoue
Facades and roofs of the building with outbuildings, except the attached garage, and the ensemble of buildings and the garden ^{(nl)} ^{(fr)}		Jurbeke	Lieutenant Saint Martin n° 1 te Masnuy-Saint-Pierre	50.536706°N 3.959357°E	53044-CLT-0004-01 Info	Gevels en daken van het hoofdgebouw met bijgebouwen, uitgezonderd de aangrenzende garage, en het ensemble van de gebouwen en de tuin
Chateau Blanc: facades and roofs, ^{(nl)} ^{(fr)}		Jurbeke	rue de Masnuy-Saint-Jean n° 26	50.531606°N 3.921842°E	53044-CLT-0005-01 Info	Château blanc: gevels en daken,

== See also ==
- List of protected heritage sites in Hainaut (province)
- Jurbise
