= Lens, Belgium =

Municipality in Hainaut Province, Wallonia, Belgium

Lens Linse (Picard)
- Municipality
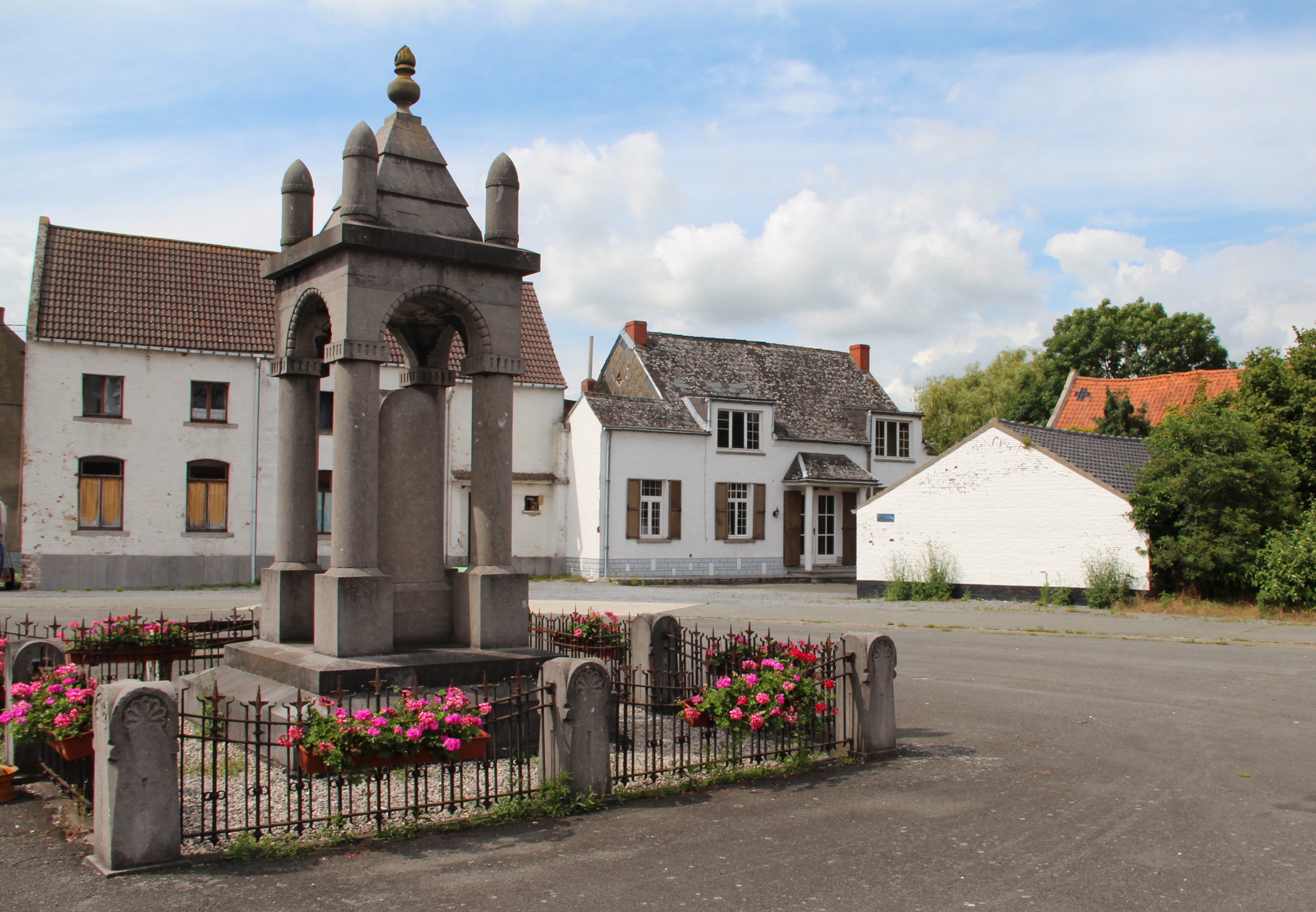

- Flag Coat of arms

- Location of Lens in Hainaut
- Interactive map of Lens
- Location in Belgium
- Coordinates: 50°33′N 03°54′E
- Country: Belgium
- Community: French Community
- Region: Wallonia
- Province: Hainaut
- Arrondissement: Mons

Government
  - Mayor: Isabelle Galant (MR) (MDC)
  - Governing party: MDC (Mouvement Démocratique Communal)

Area
  - Total: 49.83 km^{2} (19.24 sq mi)

Population (2018-01-01)
  - Total: 4,508
  - Density: 90.47/km^{2} (234.3/sq mi)
- Postal codes: 7870
- NIS code: 53046
- Area codes: 065
- Website: www.lens.be

Lens (French pronunciation: [lɑ̃s]; Picard: Linse) is a municipality of Wallonia located in the province of Hainaut, Belgium.

In 2007 its population was 4042. The total area is 49.42 km^{2} which gives a population density of 80 inhabitants per km^{2}.

The municipality consists of the following districts: Bauffe, Cambron-Saint-Vincent, Lens, Lombise, and Montignies-lez-Lens.

It is located along the N56 road.
