= Masnuy-Saint-Jean =

Belgian village

Coordinates: 50°31′53″N 3°56′36″E

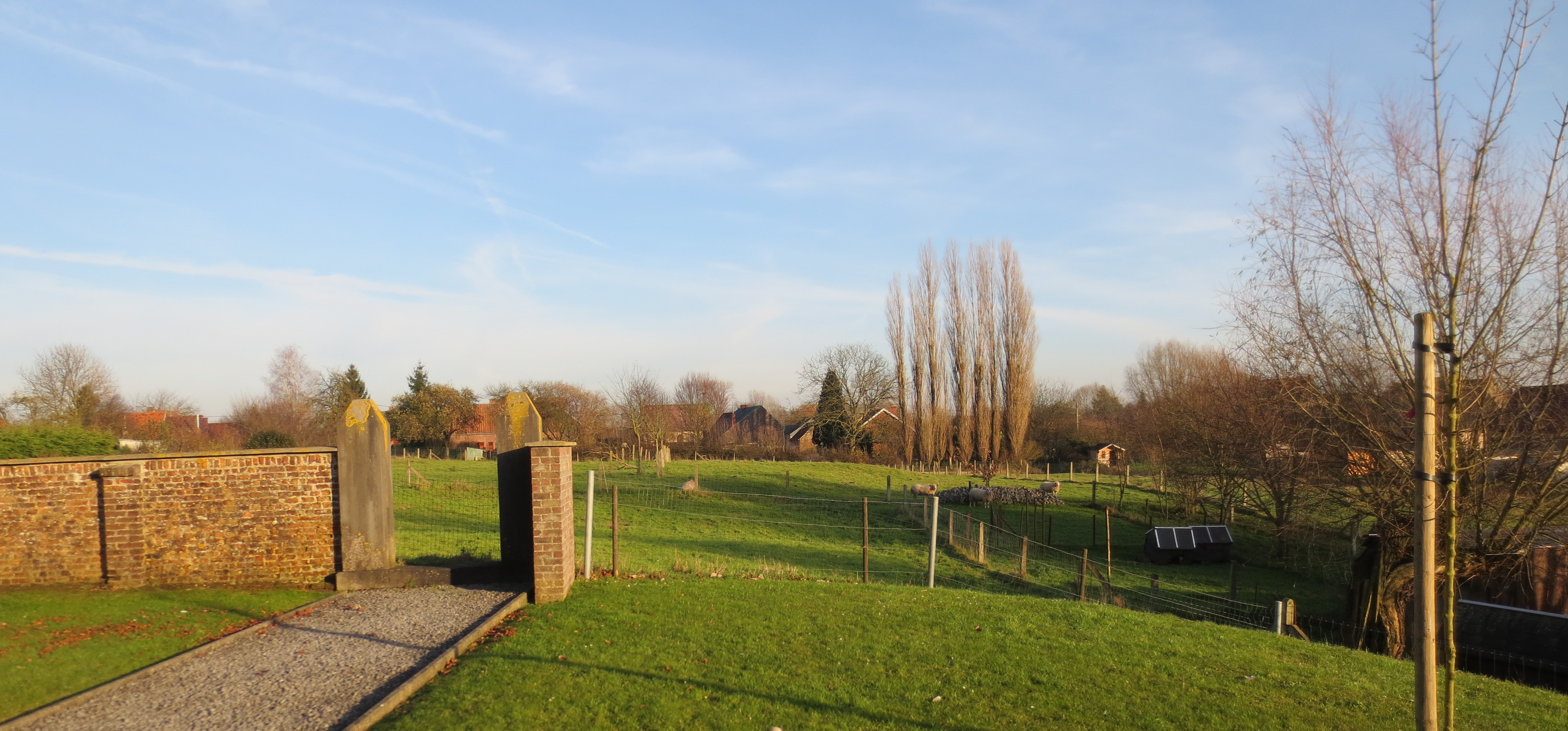
Masnuy-Saint-Jean

Masnuy-Saint-Jean (Walloon: Manû-Sint-Djan) is a village of Wallonia and a district of the municipality of Jurbise, located in the province of Hainaut, Belgium.
