= N56 road (Belgium) =

Road in Belgium

Coordinates: 50°36′10″N 3°48′55″E

National Route 56
- Dutch: Nationale Weg 56; French: Route nationale 56

Route information
- Length: 28 km (17 mi)

Major junctions
- East end: Nimy (Mons)
- 30 of A8 motorway crosses N7 in Ath
- West end: A8 motorway

Location
- Country: Belgium
- Major cities: Mons, Jurbise, Lens and Ath

Highway system
- Highways of Belgium; Motorways; National Roads

The N56 road is a Belgian national road linking Mons to Lessines passing through a junction with the Belgian A8 motorway.
