= Team Fouad Ahidar =

- Abbreviation: TFA
- Leader: Fouad Ahidar
- Founded: 9 February 2024; 2 years ago
- Split from: Vooruit
- Headquarters: Lombardstraat 69, 1000 Brussels
- Ideology: Muslim interests Multiculturalism; Anti-Zionism
- European political alliance: Free Palestine Party
- Colours: Purple
- Chamber of Representatives: 0 / 150
- Senate: 0 / 60
- Flemish Parliament: 1 / 124
- Walloon Parliament: 0 / 75
- Brussels Parliament: 3 / 17 Flemish seats
- Parliament of the French Community: 0 / 94
- European Parliament: 0 / 22
- Benelux Parliament: 0 / 21

Election symbol

Website
- fouadahidar.com

Team Fouad Ahidar (TFA) is a Belgian political party. Founded in 2024 as a minority-interest party, it is named after its founder, Fouad Ahidar.

== Establishment ==
Fouad Ahidar was elected as a Brussels MP in 2004 for sp.a, later known as Vooruit. He held a leading position in the party and was party leader. After Vooruit party chairman Conner Rousseau was charged with making racist statements, Ahidar resigned from the party in December 2023. In February 2024, he announced that he would present his own list in the Dutch-speaking electoral college in Brussels for the 2024 regional elections.

Despite being nominally a bilingual and cross-community party, Team Fouad Ahidar presented candidates in only the Dutch-speaking electoral college in Brussels and for the Flemish parliament.

== 2024 elections ==
In the elections for the Brussels Parliament on 9 June 2024, the party obtained 16.47% of the votes and three seats with Fouad Ahidar, Najima El Arbaoui and Ilyas El Omari in the Dutch language group. This made Team Fouad Ahidar the second largest faction on the Dutch-speaking side, after Groen. In addition, the party obtained 17.97% and one of the six seats with M'Hamed Kasmi in the electoral area of the Brussels members of the Flemish Parliament.

After the election, Vooruit MP Hannelore Goeman claimed that the party's success was based on "fake news and lies". The Reformist Movement and DéFI both stated they would not form a Brussels government with Team Fouad Ahidar, effectively relegating the party to opposition.

== Controversy ==
Party founder Ahidar described the October 7 attacks as "a minor reaction by part of Hamas".

== Election results ==
=== Chamber of Representatives ===
Election	Leader	Votes	%	Seats	+/-	Government
2024	Fouad Ahidar	24,826	0.36	0 / 150	New	Extra-parliamentary

=== Regional ===
==== Brussels Parliament ====
Election	Leader	Votes	%	Seats	+/-	Government
2024 (Dutch language group)	Fouad Ahidar	13,242	16.47	3 / 17	New	Opposition

==== Flemish Parliament ====
Election	Leader	Votes	%	Seats	+/-	Government
2024	Fouad Ahidar	14,187	0.32	1 / 124	New	Opposition
