= Jurbise =

Municipality in Hainaut Province, Wallonia, Belgium

Jurbise Djurbize (Picard): Jurbeke (Dutch)
- Municipality
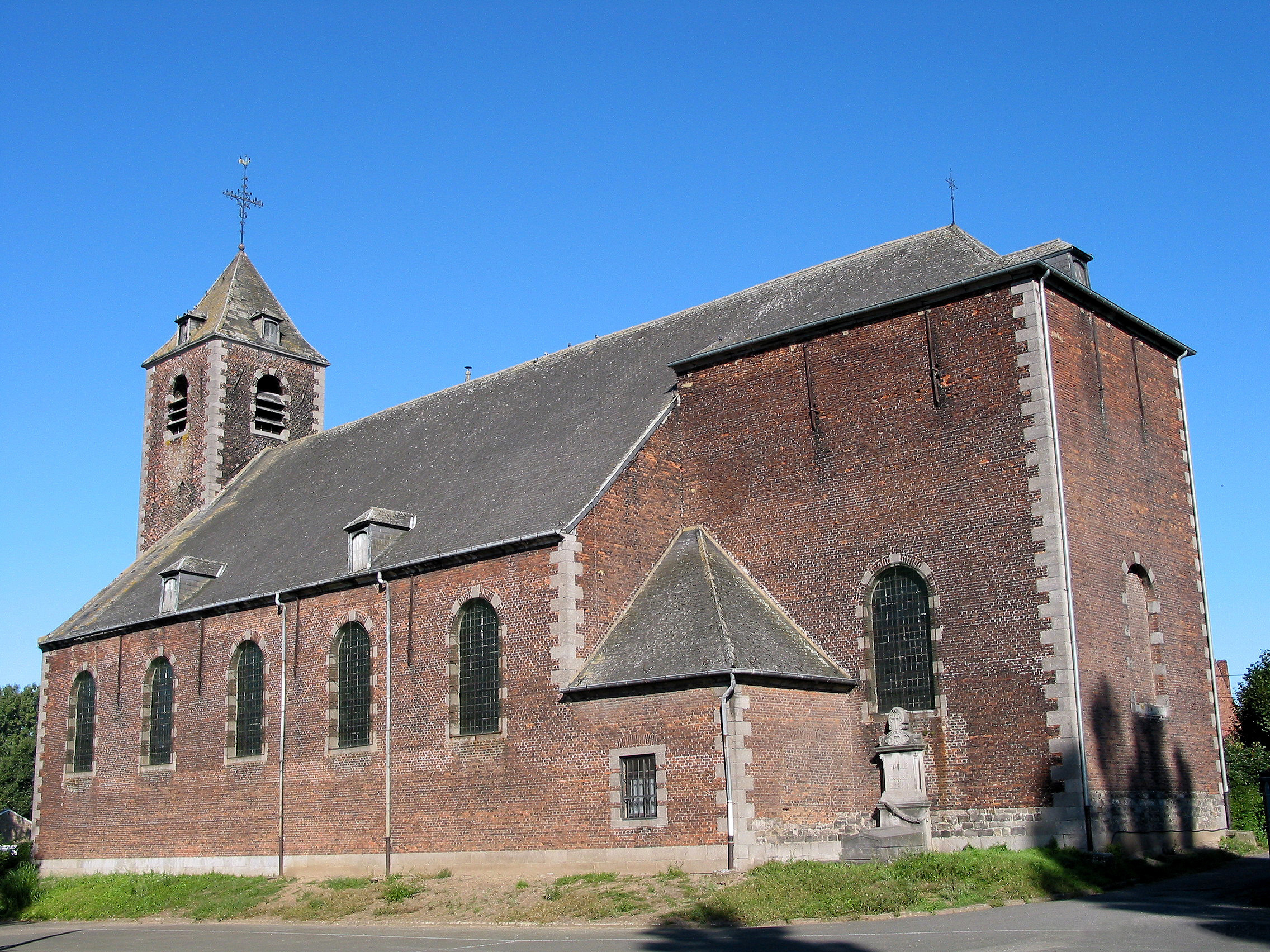
- Jurbise: St Eloi's church

- Flag Coat of arms

- Location of Jurbise in Hainaut
- Interactive map of Jurbise
- Location in Belgium
- Coordinates: 50°32′N 03°56′E
- Country: Belgium
- Community: French Community
- Region: Wallonia
- Province: Hainaut
- Arrondissement: Mons

Government
  - Mayor: Jacqueline Galant (MR) (LB)
  - Governing party: Liste du Bourgmestre (LB)

Area
  - Total: 58.18 km^{2} (22.46 sq mi)

Population (2018-01-01)
  - Total: 10,417
  - Density: 179.0/km^{2} (463.7/sq mi)
- Postal codes: 7050
- NIS code: 53044
- Area codes: 065
- Website: www.jurbise.be

Jurbise (French pronunciation: [ʒyʁbiz]; Dutch: Jurbeke; Picard: Djurbize) is a municipality of Wallonia located in the province of Hainaut, Belgium.

On 1 January 2006 the municipality had 9,571 inhabitants. The total area is 57.86 km^{2}, giving a population density of 165 inhabitants per km^{2}.

The municipality consists of the following districts: Erbaut, Erbisœul, Herchies, Jurbise, Masnuy-Saint-Jean, and Masnuy-Saint-Pierre.

The village is located along N56 road.

== Notable people ==
- Jacqueline Galant
