= Jasper Pillen =

Belgian politician (born 1984)

- Pillen in 2020

Member of the Senate
- Incumbent
- Assumed office 24 January 2025
- Appointed by: Flemish Parliament

Member of the Chamber of Representatives
- In office 1 October 2020 – 20 October 2023
- Preceded by: Vincent Van Quickenborne
- Succeeded by: Vincent Van Quickenborne
- Constituency: West Flanders

Personal details
- Born: 31 May 1984 (age 42)
- Party: Anders

Jasper Pillen (born 31 May 1984) is a Belgian politician for Anders (formerly Open Flemish Liberals and Democrats) serving as a member of the Senate since 2025. From 2020 to 2023, he was a member of the Chamber of Representatives.
