= Marc Elsen =

Belgian politician (born 1960)

Senator
- In office 5 July 2007 – June 2011

Personal details
- Born: 4 January 1960 (age 66) Petit-Rechain
- Party: cdH

Marc Elsen (born 1960) is a Belgian politician and a member of the cdH. He was elected as a member of the Belgian Senate in 2007.
