= 2024 Belgian local elections =

- 13 October 2024

All 10 provincial councils All 565 municipal councils All 8 directly elected OCMW/CPAS councils All 10 Antwerp city district councils

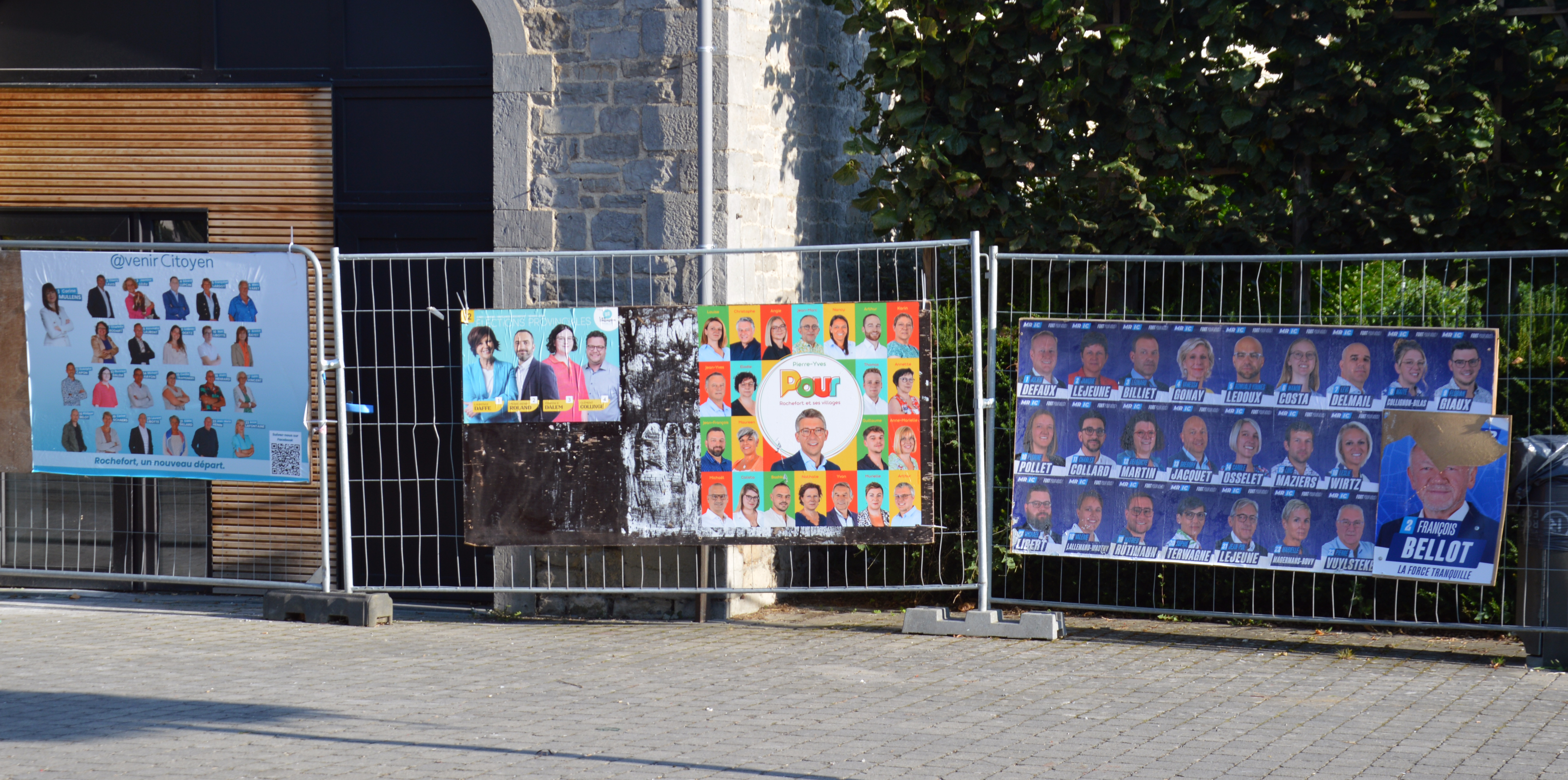
Election campaign posters displayed in Han-sur-Lesse, Rochefort, Belgium, ahead of the 2024 municipal elections.

The 2024 Belgian provincial, municipal and district elections took place on Sunday 13 October 2024, four months after the simultaneous European, federal and regional elections.

The local elections were organised by the respective regions:

- Brussels with 19 municipalities
- Flanders with 5 provinces and 285 municipalities (down from 300)
  - In the city of Antwerp, elections were also held for its 10 districts (up from 9)
- Wallonia with 5 provinces and 261 municipalities (one fewer)
  - In the German-speaking Community, the elections are organised by that community rather than the Walloon Region

In the municipalities with language facilities of Voeren, Comines-Warneton and the 6 of the Brussels Periphery, the aldermen and members of the OCMW/CPAS council are directly elected.

As reflected in the number of municipalities above, some municipalities were merging. One of them, Borsbeek, merged with the city of Antwerp, becoming its tenth district. In Wallonia, only Bastogne and Bertogne were merging. The mergers took effect following the 2024 elections, on the 1 January 2025, when the councils of the newly formed entities were elected.

== Brussels ==
The municipal councils of the 19 municipalities were elected.

Voting is obligatory in Brussels and Walloon local elections.

== Flanders ==
The Flemish decree of 16 July 2021 reformed the local electoral process, abolishing compulsory voting in Flemish local elections. Voting remains obligatory in Brussels and Walloon local elections.

The decree also changed several election rules for Flemish municipal elections:

- the list vote is abolished; only preference votes placed on specific candidates count.
- The candidate with the highest number of preferences vote of the list with the most votes (as per votes placed on candidates) has the exclusive right to form a coalition during two weeks.
- The candidate with the largest number of preference votes belonging to the most-popular party within the formed coalition will be mayor by law.

This incentivises forming larger, joint lists instead of smaller, separate ones.

Turnout was lower than expected, with on average 63.6% of voters casting a ballot. Eeklo had the lowest turnout and Mesen the highest.

=== Electoral system ===
Municipal councils were elected by the Imperiali highest averages method, a form of open-list party-list proportional representation.

=== Municipal elections ===
Antwerp

Two-term mayor Bart De Wever (N-VA) was a candidate to continue governing the most populous city, Antwerp. Main challenger was PVDA with Jos D'Haese.

Gent

Open Vld (with mayor Mathias De Clercq) and Groen (with first alderman Filip Watteeuw) were the two main political parties since the 2018 elections. The current governing coalition is composed of Vooruit-Groen (a joint list in 2018), Open Vld and CD&V. Open Vld and Vooruit formed a joint "Voor Gent" list, opposing a Groen list.

Mechelen

Bart Somers, mayor of Mechelen since 2001, became Flemish minister in 2019 but returned as mayor in November 2023. He headed the "Voor Mechelen" list, composed of the Open Vld, Groen and M+ governing coalition.

=== Raes controversy ===
In September 2024, the Vlaams Belang sparked controversy by putting Roeland Raes who had previously been convicted of Holocaust denial as one of its candidates in the upcoming municipal elections before removing his candidacy the following day.

=== Provincial elections ===
The provincial councils of Antwerp, Flemish Brabant, East Flanders, West Flanders and Limburg were elected. Councillors are elected for a six-year term, starting on the first working day in December following the elections, thus 2 December 2024.

Party	Antwerp			East Flanders			Flemish Brabant			Limburg			West Flanders			Total		
Party	Votes	%	Seats	Votes	%	Seats	Votes	%	Seats	Votes	%	Seats	Votes	%	Seats	Votes	%	Seats
N-VA	264,316	32.9%	15	171,646	22.7%	9	128,407	24.7%	10	81,440	20.8%	7	116,955	20.3%	7	762,764	25.6% (▲0.8pp)	48 (▲2)
CD&V	116,862	14.5%	5	122,887	16.9%	7	93,141	17.9%	7	99,157	25.4%	10	147,814	25.6%	11	579,861	19.5% (▼0.2pp)	40
Vlaams Belang	144,483	18%	7	132,756	18.2%	7	66,927	12.9%	5	69,910	17.9%	6	112,896	19.6%	8	526,972	17.7% (▲4.7pp)	33 (▲9)
Vooruit	88,127	11%	4	101,031	13.9%	5	66,626	12.8%	5	56,456	14.4%	4	91,389	15.8%	6	403,629	13.5% (▲3.1pp)	24 (▲6)
Groen	81,116	10.1%	3	86,732	11.9%	4	52,689	10.1%	3	19,672	5%	1	37,850	7.3%	2	278,059	9.3% (▼3.9pp)	13 (▼8)
Open Vld	37,423	4.7%	0	82,267	11.3%	4	55,464	10.7%	4	41,799	12.7%	3	46,364	8%	2	263,317	8.8% (▼4.9pp)	13 (▼10)
PVDA	51,405	4.5%	1	31,633	4.1%	0	19,555	3.8%	0	16,307	4.2%	0	14,436	2.5%	0	133,336	4.7% (▲1.5pp)	1
Others	13,378	1.7%	0	7,219	0.9%	0	5,864	1.1%	0	7,807	1.4%	0	6,443	1.6%	0	40,711	1.3% (▼0.3pp)	0
UF	—			—			31,428	6%	2	—			—			31,428	0.7%	2 (▼3)
Total	767,110	100%	36	736,171	100%	36	478,503	100%	36	423,976	100%	31	574,147	100%	36	2,979,907	100%	175

== Wallonia ==
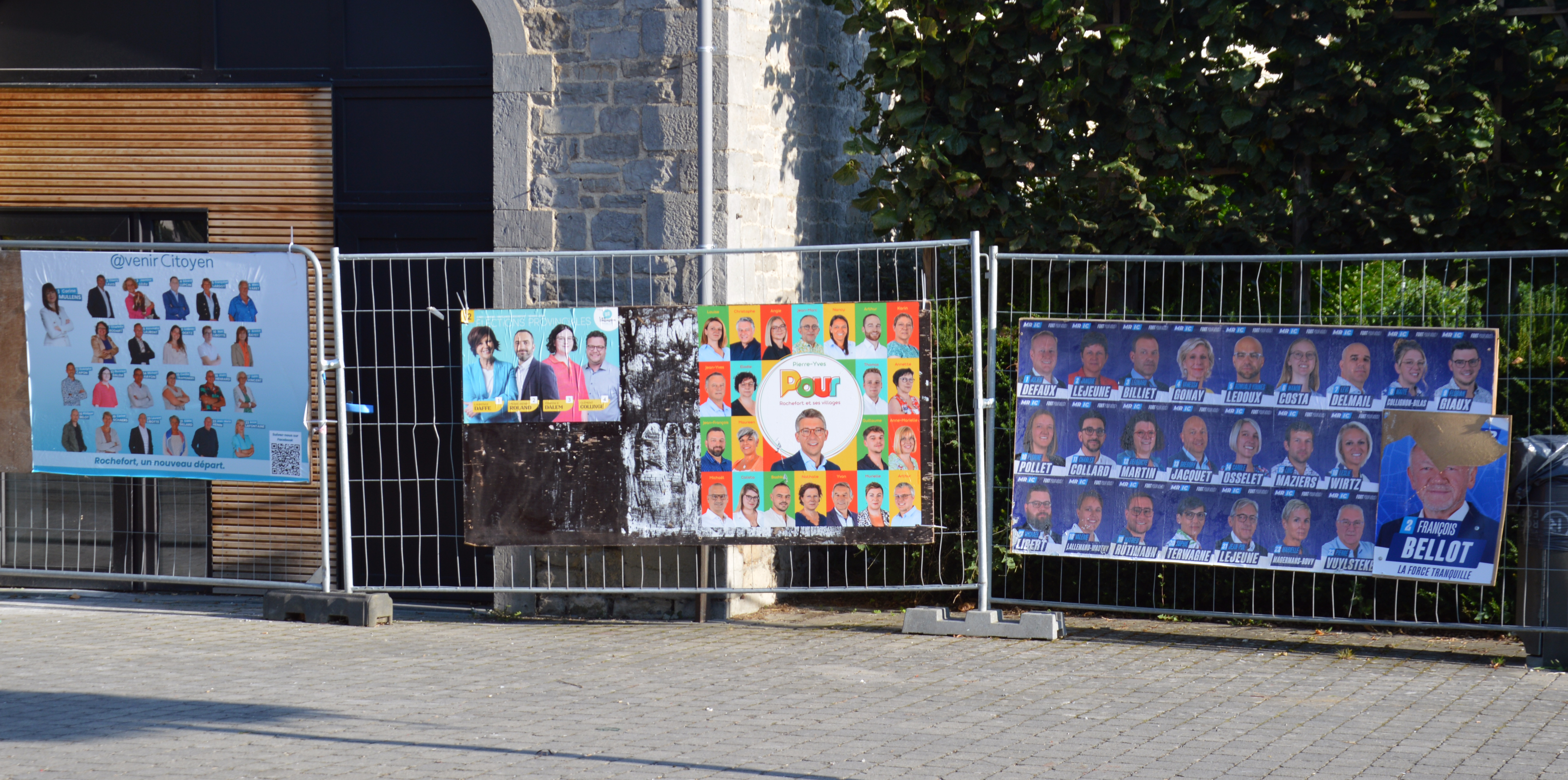
Election posters in Rochefort.

The five provincial councils and the municipal councils were elected.

In eight municipalities, only one electoral list was submitted: their candidates were automatically elected. This was the case in Herbeumont, Houffalize, Rouvroy, Anhée, Bièvre, Vresse-sur-Semois, Limbourg and Verlaine.
