= Pascal Baurain =

Belgian politician (1969–2025)

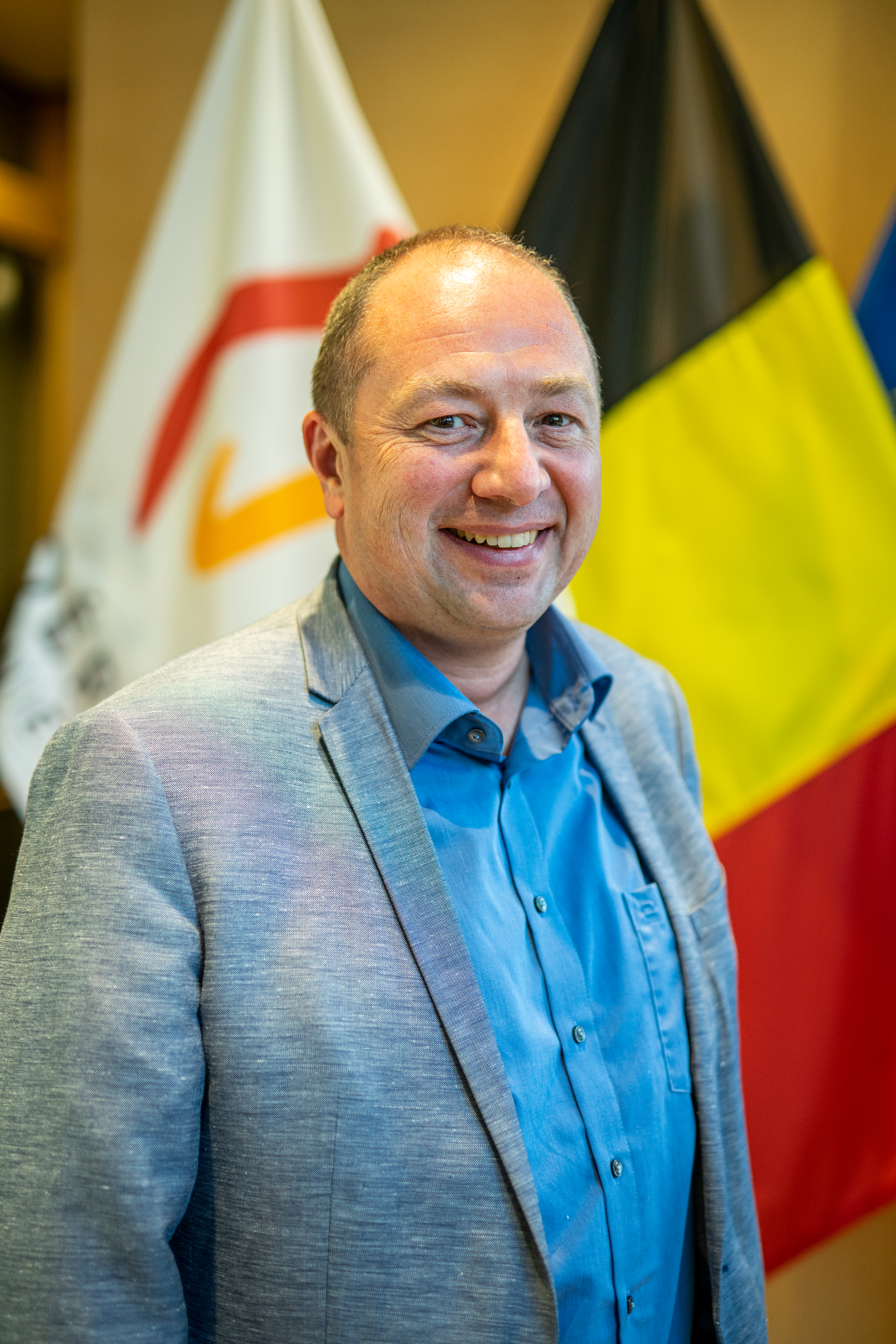
- Baurain in 2024

Member of the Parliament of Wallonia for the Arrondissement of Mons
- In office 9 June 2024 – 3 September 2025
- In office May 2016 – November 2018

Personal details
- Born: 12 September 1969; Mons, Belgium
- Died: 3 September 2025 (aged 55)
- Political party: CDH; LE
- Occupation: Lawyer

Pascal Baurain (French: [paskal boʁɛ̃]; 12 September 1969 – 3 September 2025) was a Belgian politician of the Humanist Democratic Centre (CDH) and Les Engagés (LE).

== Life and career ==
Born in Mons on 12 September 1969, Baurain was admitted to the Mons Bar Association in 1998. He specialized in juvenile rights and commercial law and notably represented Logis Saint-Ghislainois, a social housing company. He became attracted to politics in 2006 in the commune Saint-Ghislaine, which at the time was dominated by the Socialist Party. He was a Public Centre for Social Welfare advisor from 2007 to 2011. In 2012, he became Saint-Ghislaine's opposition leader in the municipal council. In 2018, he maintained his position as opposition leader, even receiving a higher preferential vote total than the mayor. In 2024, his seat share dropped to eight out of 27.

In 2014, Baurain was the third substitute on the CDH list in the Parliament of Wallonia's Arrondissement of Mons. In May 2016, incumbent Savine Moucheron resigned her seat to serve as mayor of Mons; first and second substitutes Cindy Bériot and Carlo Di Antonio refused the seat, allowing Baurain to take office. He held the seat until November 2018, when Moucheron returned to her position. In 2024, he regained his seat.

Baurain died of bile duct cancer on 3 September 2025, at the age of 55.
