= Fouad Ahidar =

Belgian politician

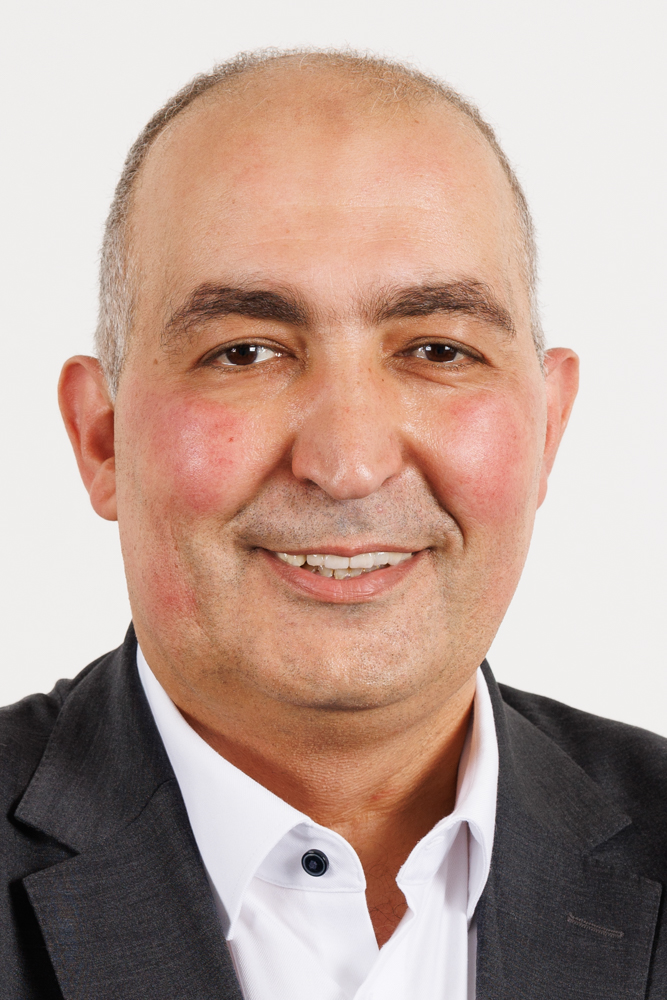
- Official portrait, 2024

Member of the Parliament of the Brussels-Capital Region
- Incumbent
- Assumed office 13 June 2004

Personal details
- Born: October 13, 1973 (age 53) Mechelen, Belgium
- Party: Team Fouad Ahidar (since 2024)
- Other political affiliations: VU (1997–2001); SLP (2001–2008); Vooruit (2008–2022); Independent (2022–2024)
- Children: 5

Fouad Ahidar (born 13 October 1973) is a Belgian politician who currently serves as the leader of Team Fouad Ahidar, a political party in Belgium. He is currently a member of the Parliament of the Brussels-Capital Region.

== Political career ==
In the early 2000s, Ahidar was employed at the Flemish Ministry of Culture and Youth, as part of the staff of minister Bert Anciaux. He worked three years in this role, where he was responsible for economic issues, and issues pertaining to the Islamic community.

In 2004, Ahidar was elected to the Parliament of the Brussels-Capital Region as a member of Socialistische Partij Anders (SP.A).

From 2014 to 2019, he was vice-president of the Brussels Parliament. In 2022, he was expelled from Vooruit (as the Socialistische Partij Anders was renamed in 2021) for voting against the obligation to stun animals before slaughter.

Having remained an independent between 2022 and 2024, he founded his own party, Team Fouad Ahidar, in 2024.

In the June 2024 elections, Ahidar led his party in what became an unexpectedly strong campaign. The campaign organized primarily around issues relevant to the Islamic community, such as defending Halal slaughter against animal welfare legislation, the Gaza war, and opposition to restrictions on niqabs and burqas. Ahidar also incorporated other themes into the campaign, including housing and purchasing power.

In the June elections, Team Fouad Ahidar won three seats in the Brussels Parliament, and one seat in the Flemish Parliament. The party's emphasis on religious issues is a source of friction in coalition negotiations, with the Open Flemish Liberals and Democrats, New Flemish Alliance, and Reformist Movement ruling out any cooperation with Team Fouad Ahidar.

Ahidar is a friend of the controversial imam Mohamed Toujgani. Toujgani is the subject of an ongoing deportation case on the basis of alleged extremist and anti-Semitic remarks.
