= Jacqueline Galant =

Belgian politician

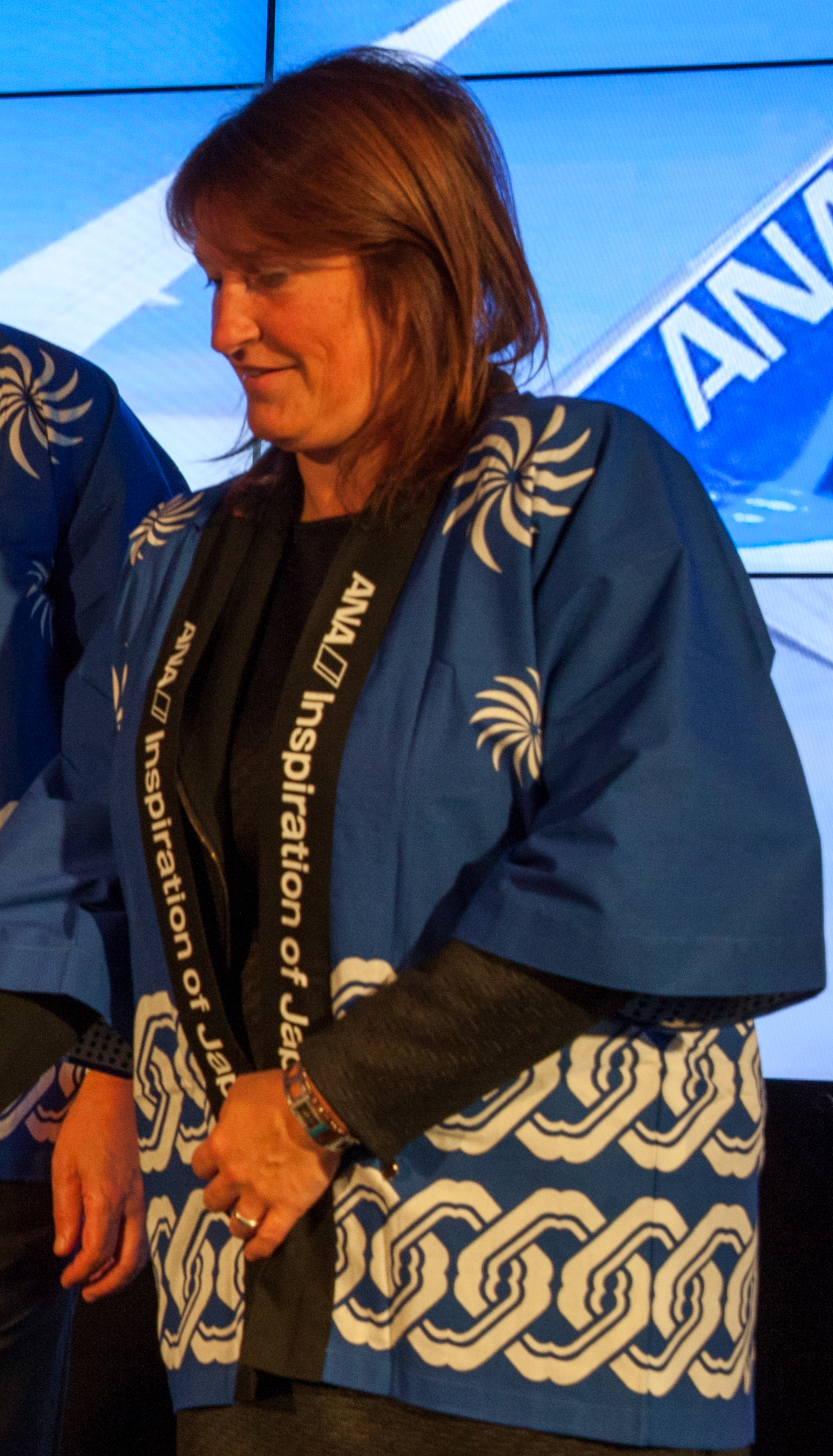
- Jacqueline Galant in 2015

Minister of Mobility
- In office October 11, 2014 – April 15, 2016
- Monarch: Philippe of Belgium
- Prime Minister: Charles Michel
- Preceded by: Catherine Fonck
- Succeeded by: François Bellot

Mayor of Jurbise
- Incumbent
- Assumed office 2001

Personal details
- Born: March 18, 1974 (age 52) Mons,
- Party: Mouvement Réformateur
- Education: Catholic university of Mons

Jacqueline Galant (French pronunciation: [ʒaklin ɡalɑ̃]) is a Belgian politician from the Mouvement Réformateur. She was the Minister of Mobility, responsible for Belgocontrol and the National Railway Company of Belgium, in the federal Belgian Michel Government from 11 October 2014 until she resigned on 15 April 2016 in the wake of the 2016 Brussels bombings. She remains the mayor of Jurbise.

== Biography ==
Jacqueline Galant was born in Mons on 18 March 1974. She was the daughter of the mayor of Jurbise, Jacques Galant, from the Christian Social Party. She got a Master in Political Sciences at the Catholic university of Mons.

In 1999 she started working as an advisor to Louis Michel, then Belgian foreign minister and vice-prime minister. She ended this work when she became a Member of Parliament in 2003, a position she kept until 2014, when she became a member of the Parliament of Wallonia from May until October.

When the Michel Government was sworn in on 11 October 2014, Galant became the Minister of Mobility. With most of the responsibilities for Mobility in Belgium transferred to the regional levels, this mainly meant that she was responsible for the National Railway Company of Belgium and for Belgocontrol. Charles Michel, the prime minister, is the son of her first employer Louis Michel. Galant resigned on 15 April 2016.

In 2001, she became mayor of Jurbise.

== Resignation ==
In the aftermath of the 2016 Brussels bombings, Galant was questioned by the Parliament about reports that the security at the Belgian national airport Brussels Airport had been found wanting by a 2015 report from the European Commission; it claimed that due to lack of resources, not enough airport inspections could be done. Galant claimed not to know of such a report, but leaked documents showed that she had been informed about them. She also first claimed never to have received requests for more inspectors, but another leaked document showed that this had been requested from her in 2014. Galant then resigned from the Belgian government.
