= Anne Lambelin =

Belgian politician (born 1987)

Member of the Senate
- Incumbent
- Assumed office 18 July 2024
- Appointed by: Parliament of Wallonia
- In office 19 June 2014 – 19 June 2019
- Appointed by: Parliament of Wallonia

Personal details
- Born: 19 December 1987 (age 38)
- Party: Socialist Party

Anne Lambelin (born 19 December 1987) is a Belgian politician. She has been a member of the Senate since 2024, having previously served from 2014 to 2019. She has served as group leader of the Socialist Party since 2024.
