= Christophe Collignon =

Belgian politician

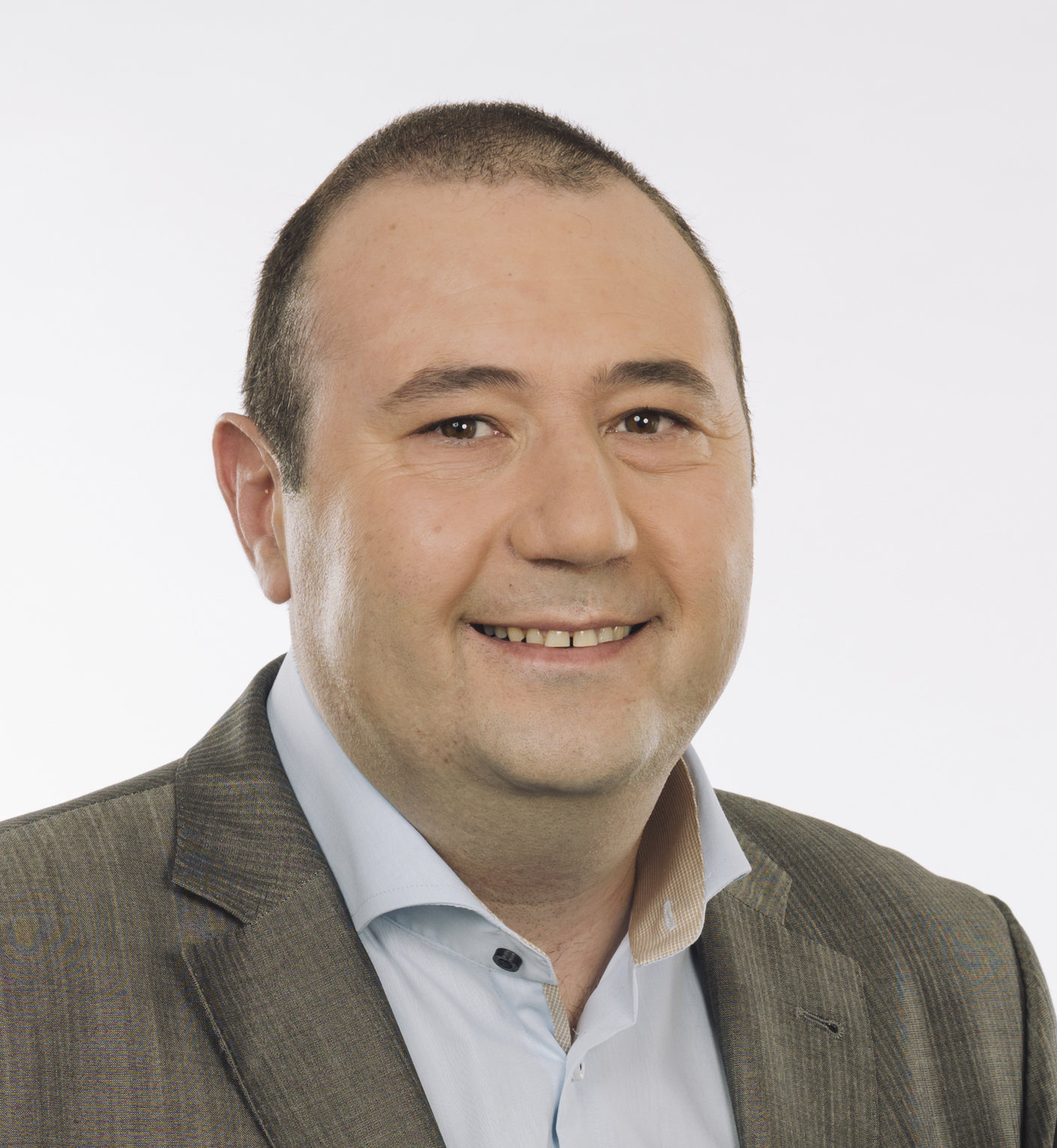

Senator
- In office 5 July 2007 – June 2011

Personal details
- Born: 21 July 1969 (age 56) Waremme
- Party: PS
- Website: christophe-collignon.blogspot.com

Christophe Collignon (born 21 July 1969) is a Belgian politician and a member of the PS. He was elected as a member of the Belgian Senate in 2007.

He is Minister of Local Government and Housing of Wallonia since 2020.
