= List of members of the European Parliament for Belgium, 2024–2029 =

This is a list of the 22 members of the European Parliament for Belgium in the 2024 to 2029 session. The members were elected in the 2024 European Parliament election in Belgium.

== List ==
Name	National party	EP Group	Ref.
Dutch-speaking electoral college (13)			
Gerolf Annemans	Vlaams Belang (VB)	PfE	
Barbara Bonte	Vlaams Belang (VB)	PfE	
Tom Vandendriessche	Vlaams Belang (VB)	PfE	
Assita Kanko	New Flemish Alliance (NVA)	ECR	
Kris Van Dijck	New Flemish Alliance (NVA)	ECR	
Johan Van Overtveldt	New Flemish Alliance (NVA)	ECR	
Wouter Beke	Christian Democratic and Flemish (CD&V)	EPP	
Liesbet Sommen	Christian Democratic and Flemish (CD&V)	EPP	
Bruno Tobback	Vooruit	S&D	
Kathleen Van Brempt	Vooruit	S&D	
Sara Matthieu	Groen	Greens/EFA	
Hilde Vautmans	Open Flemish Liberals and Democrats (Anders)	RE	
Rudi Kennes	Workers' Party of Belgium (PTB)	GUE–NGL	
French-speaking electoral college (8)
Benoît Cassartt	Reformist Movement (MR)	RE	
Olivier Chastel	Reformist Movement (MR)	RE	
Sophie Wilmés	Reformist Movement (MR)	RE	
Estelle Ceulemans	Socialist Party (PS)	S&D	
Elio Di Rupo	Socialist Party (PS)	S&D	
Marc Botenga	Workers' Party of Belgium (PVDA)	GUE–NGL	
Yvan Verougstraete	Les Engagés (LE)	RE	
Saskia Bricmont	Ecolo	Greens/EFA	
German-speaking electoral college (1)
Pascal Arimont	Christian Social Party (CSP)	EPP	

Source: "Results of the 2024 European elections". Élections européennes.
