= Jos D'Haese =

Belgian communist politician

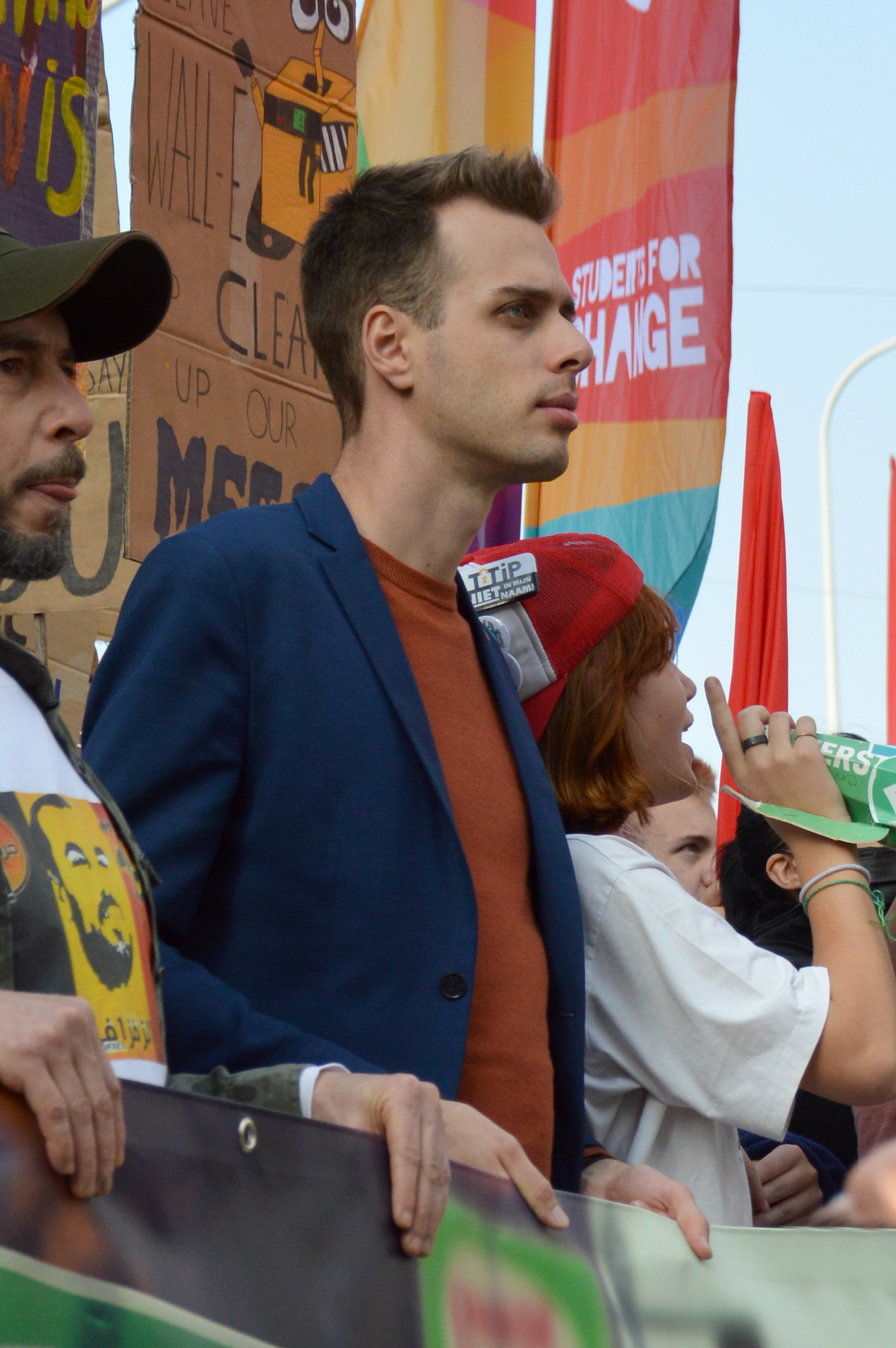
- D’haese in 2021

Member of the Flemish Parliament for Antwerp Province
- Incumbent
- Assumed office 2019

Personal details
- Party: Workers' Party of Belgium

Jos D'Haese (born August 24, 1992) is a Belgian politician who since 2019 has represented Antwerp Province in the Flemish Parliament, where he is the faction leader for the Workers' Party of Belgium, a socialist party with a Marxist background. D'Haese was also a member of the district council of Borgerhout and of the Belgian Senate.

== Biography ==
Jos D'Haese was born on 24 August 1992 in Sint-Niklaas.

D'Haese obtained a master's degree in biology at the University of Antwerp in 2018. He was an elected student representative and chaired Comac, the student organization of the Workers' Party, in Antwerp. D'Haese co-founded the festival DiverCity.

He successfully led the Workers' Party list during the 2018 local elections in Borgerhout and took office in early 2019. During the 2019 Belgian regional elections both he and Lise Vandecasteele were elected to the Flemish Parliament. He was a part of the first delegation from the Workers' Party in the Flemish Parliament.

== See also ==
- Raoul Hedebouw
- Peter Mertens
