= ManiFiesta =

Belgian cultural and political festival

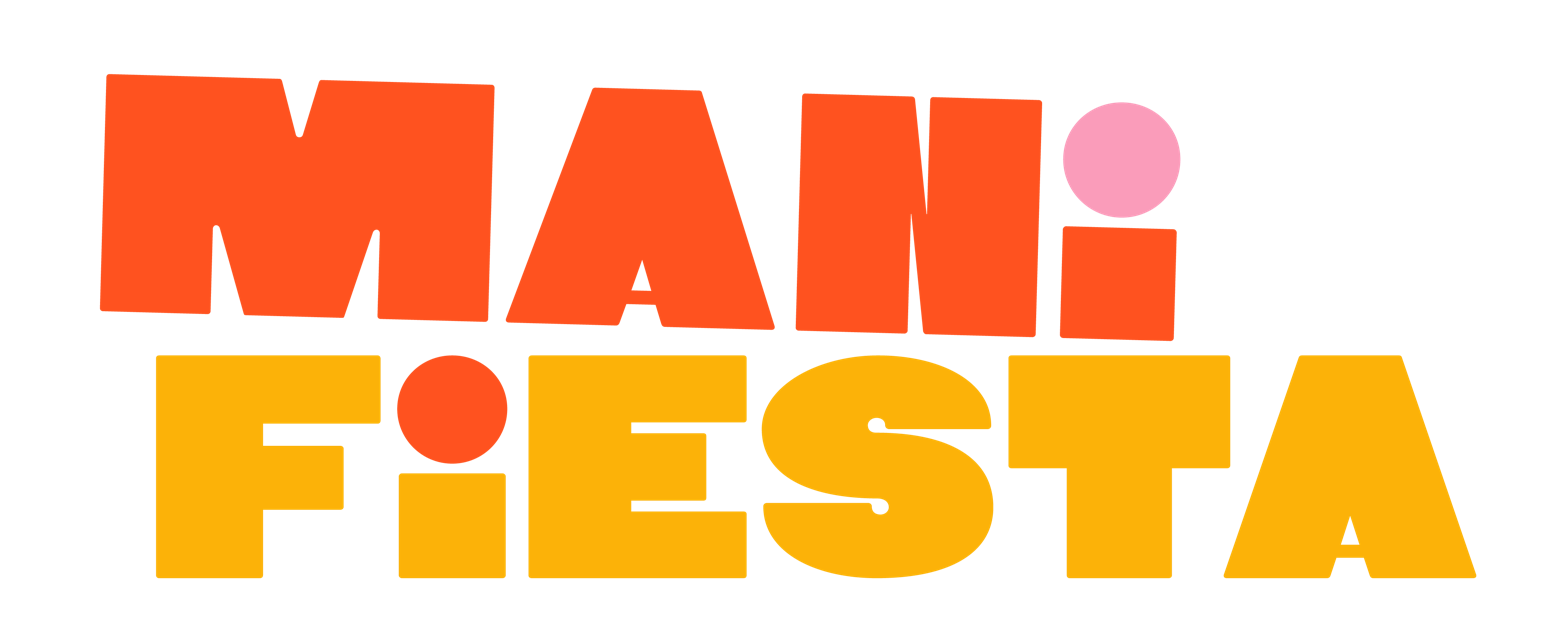

- Main concourse, 2026
- Nickname: Fête de la Solidarité; Feest van de Solidariteit
- Status: active
- Frequency: 2nd weekend of September
- Country: Belgium
- Years active: 16
- Inaugurated: 2010
- Most recent: 2026
- Next event: 2027
- Attendance: 17,000
- Organiser: Fakto and Médecine pour le Peuple/Geneeskunde voor het Volk
- Website: manifiesta.be

ManiFiesta is an annual cultural and political festival in Belgium, organized by the party media of the Workers' Party of Belgium and the health centres Médecine pour le Peuple. From 2010 to 2019 it was held in Bredene on the Belgian coast, after which it moved to Ostend. The 2023 edition received 16,900 visitors. Prominent speakers have included Aleida Guevara, Angela Davis, Chris Smalls, Dilma Rousseff, Jean-Luc Mélenchon, Omar Barghouti, Rutger Bregman, Shawn Fain, and leaders of the Workers' Party of Belgium, such as Raoul Hedebouw and Peter Mertens.
