= 2024 European Parliament election in Belgium =

- 9 June 2024

All 22 Belgian seats to the European Parliament
- Turnout: 93.9%
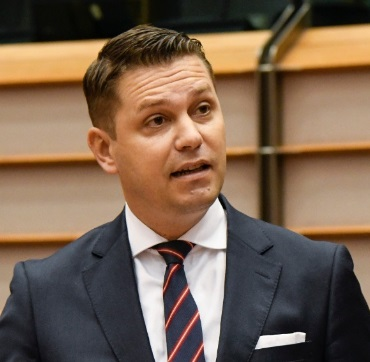

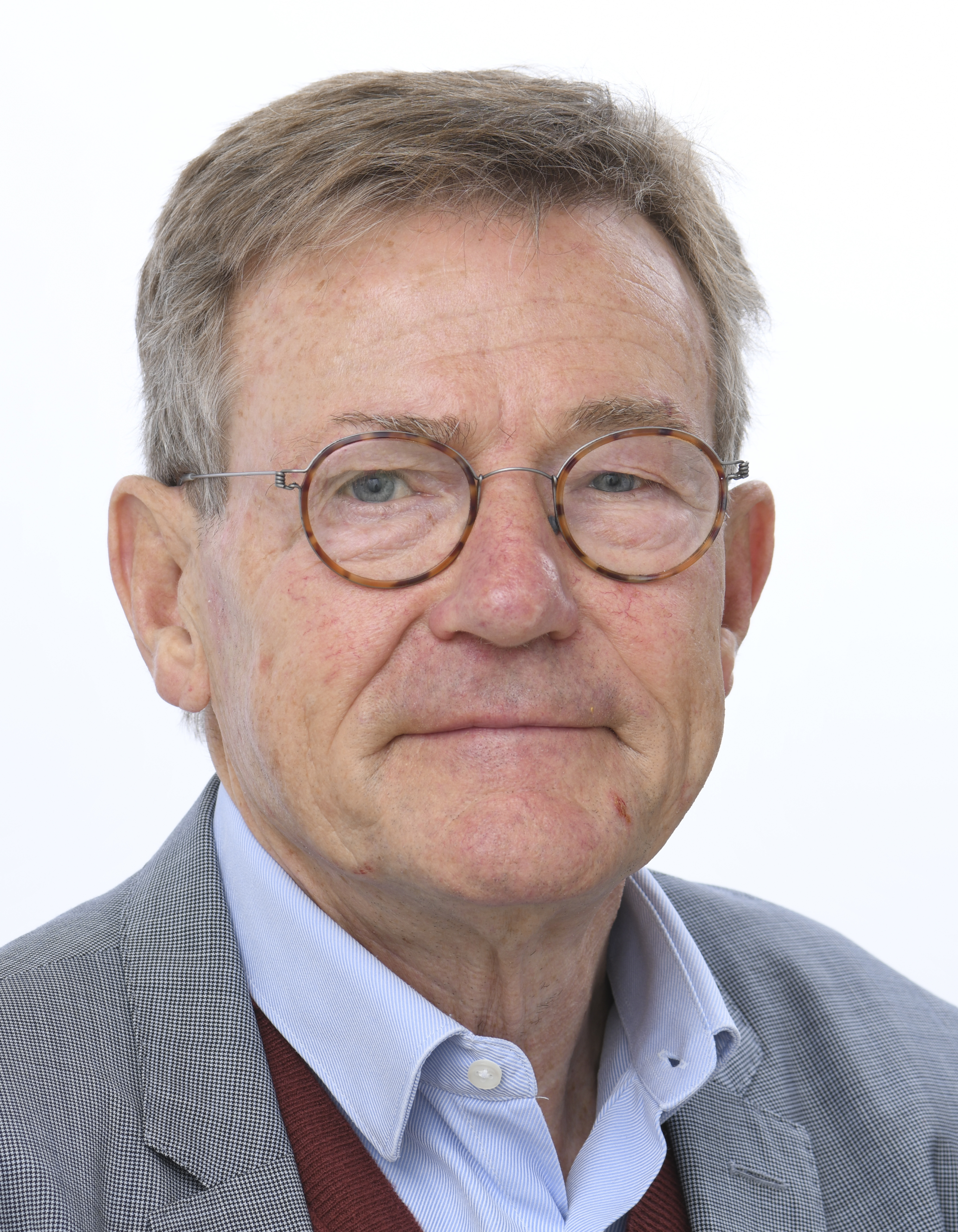

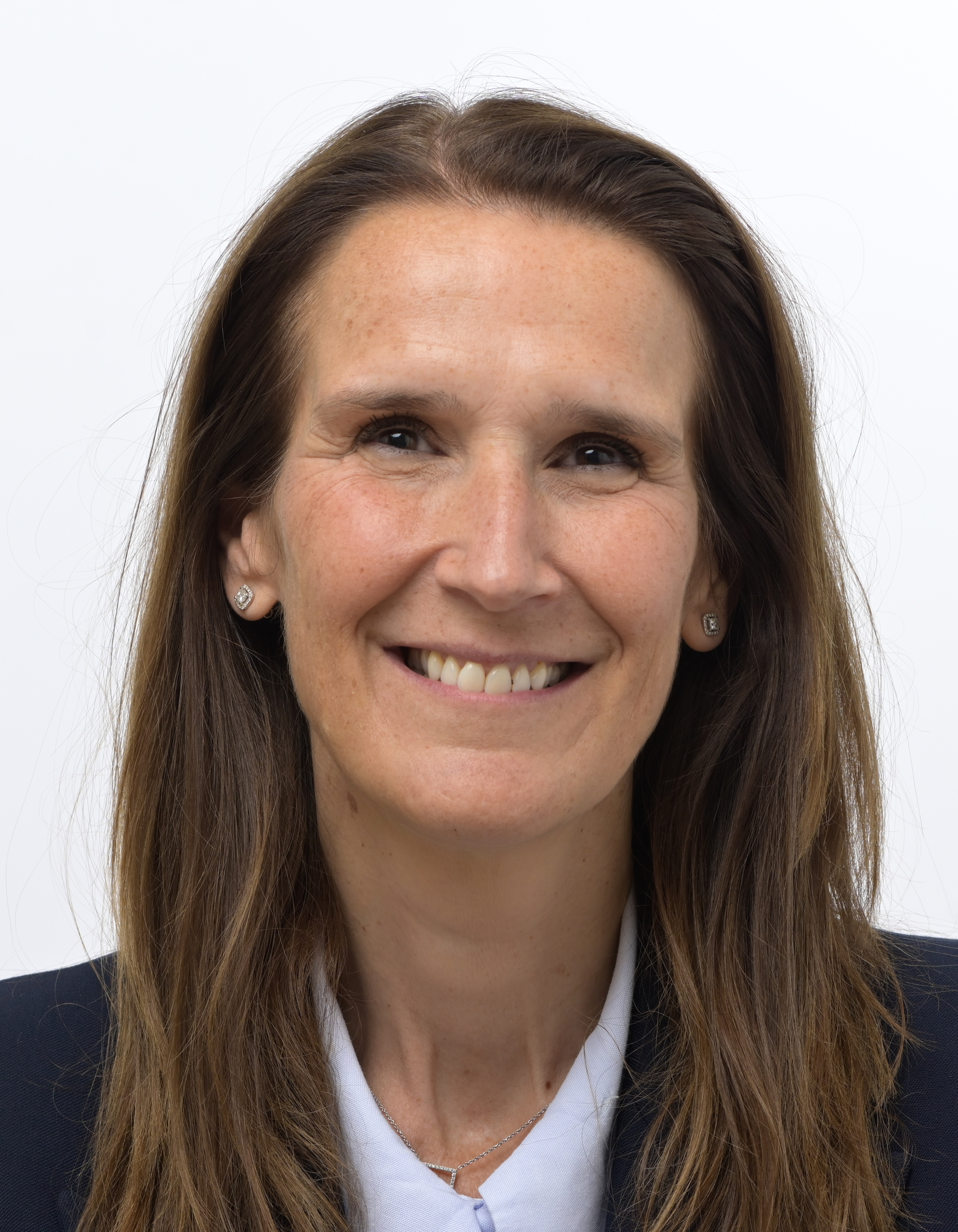

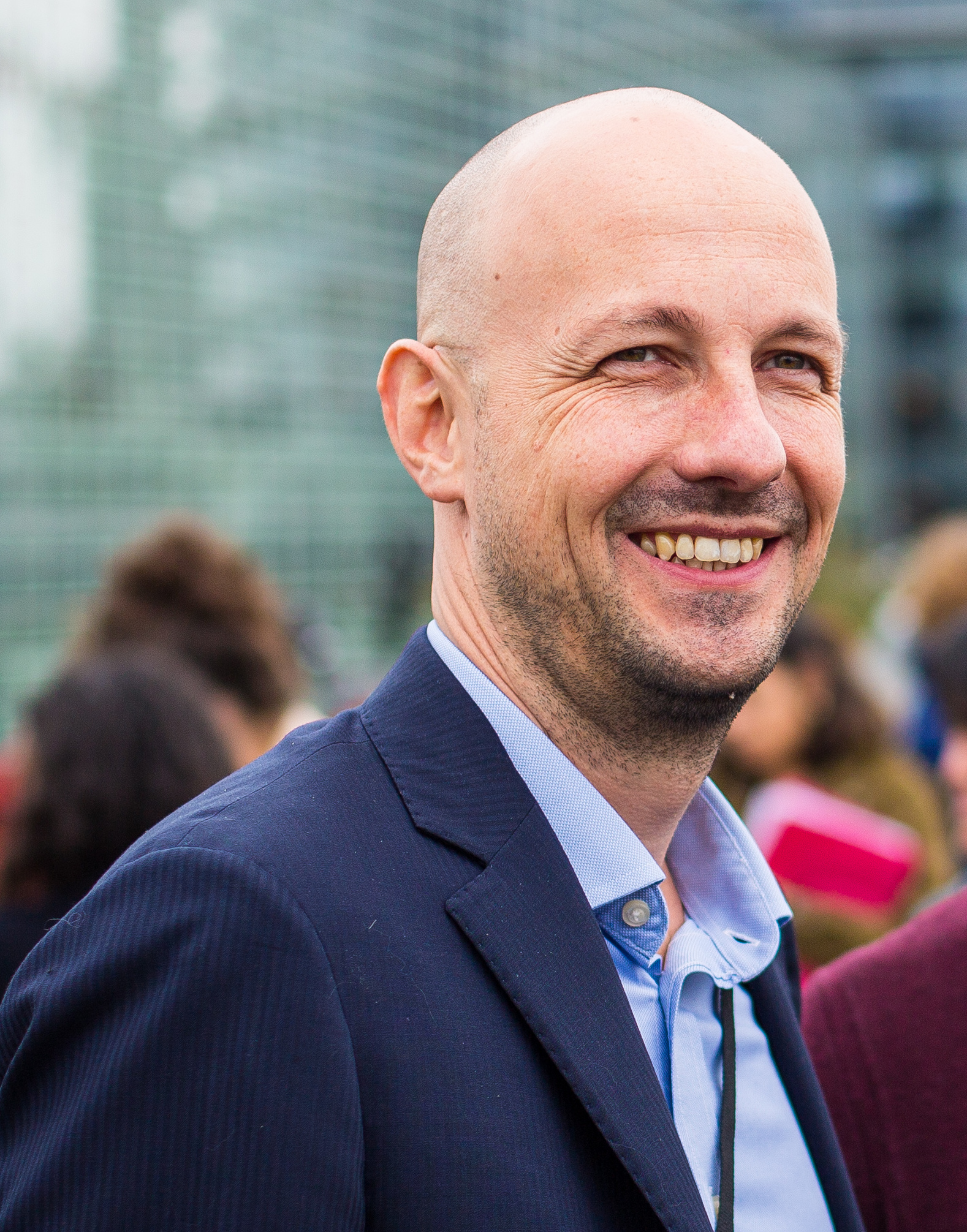

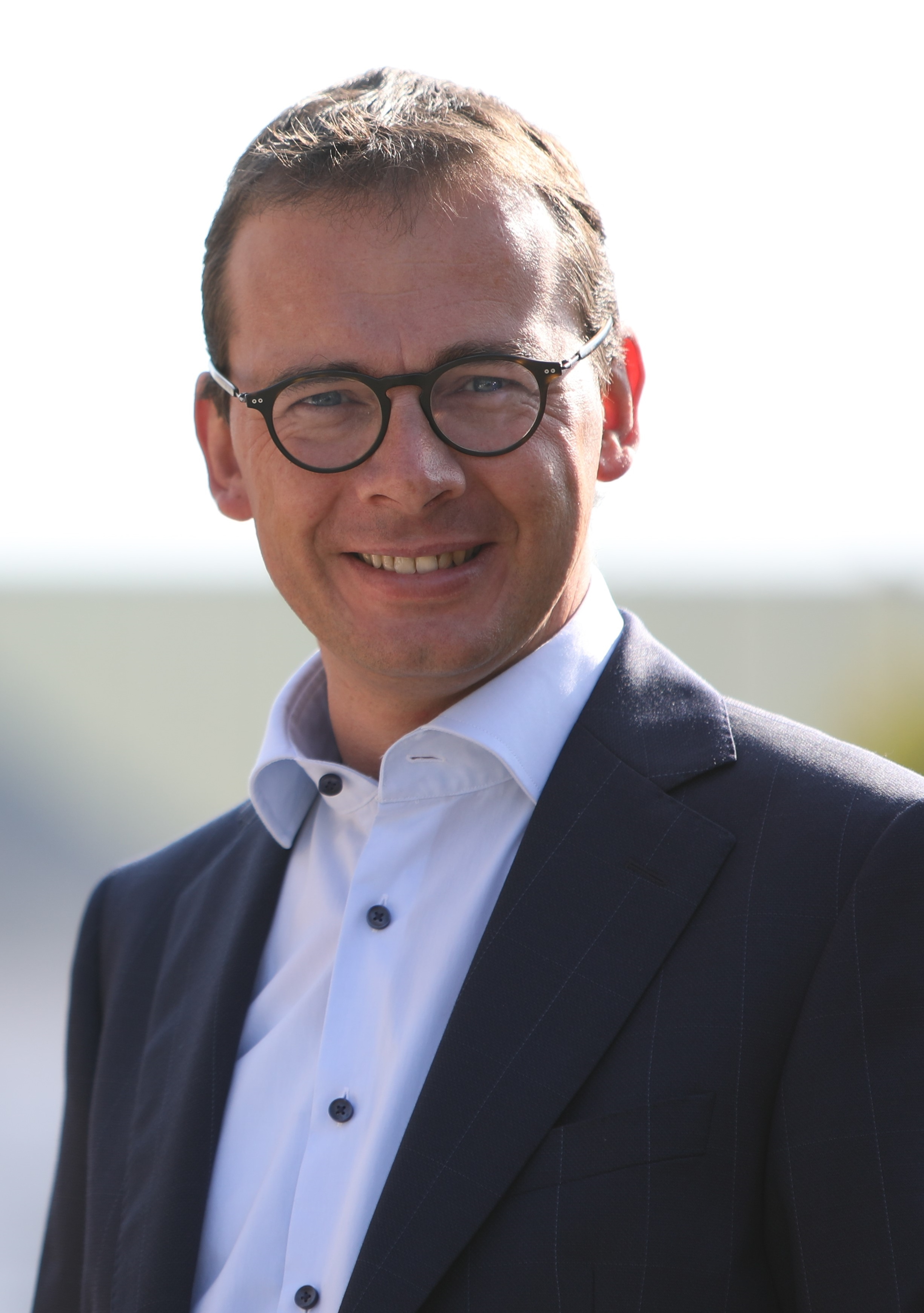

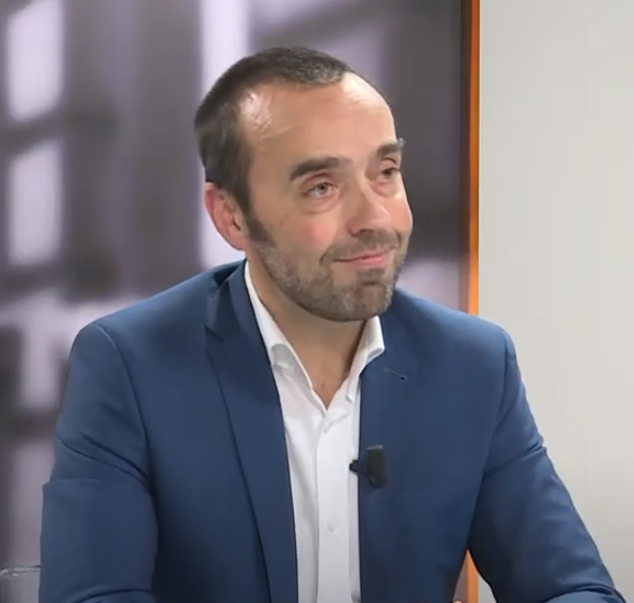

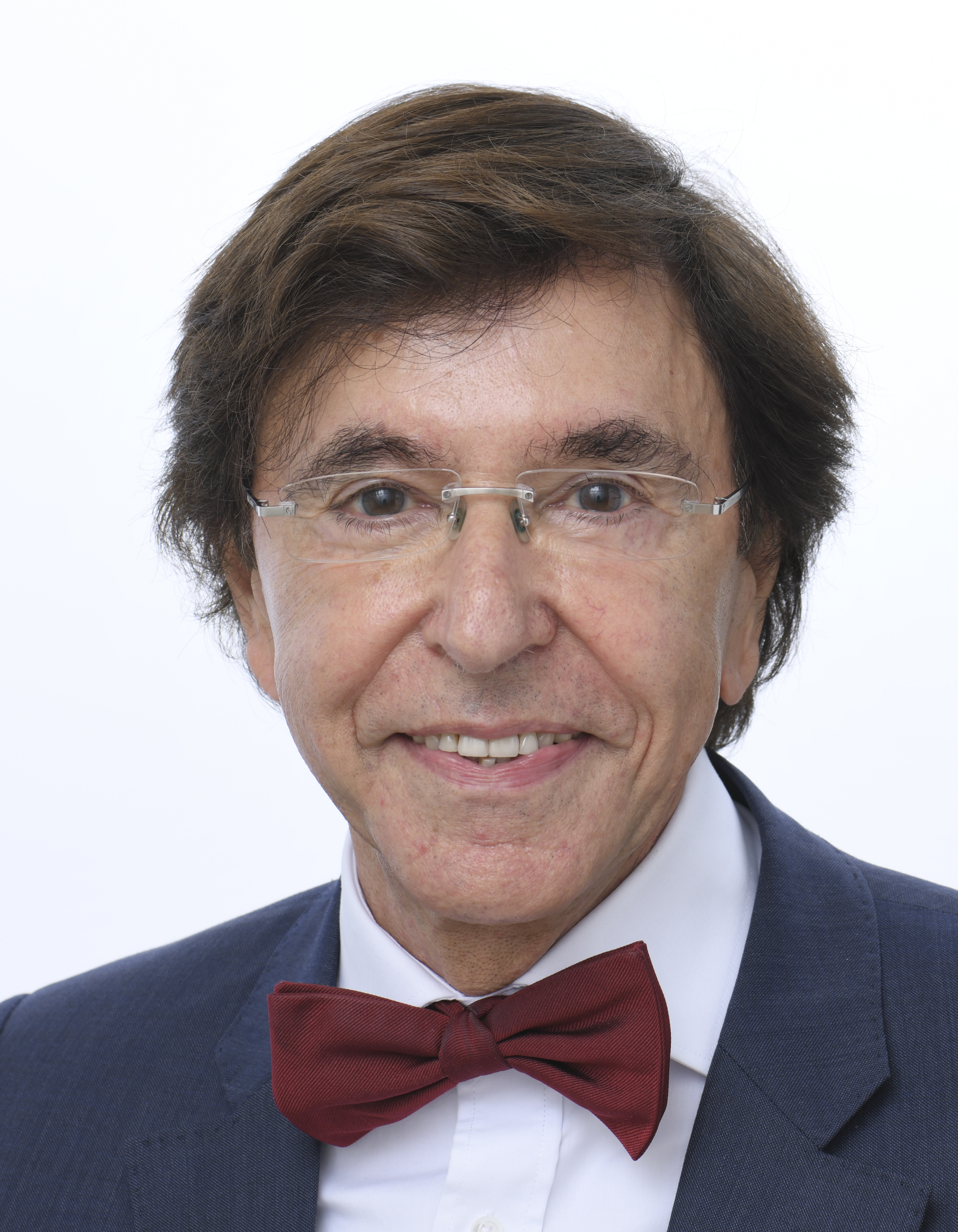

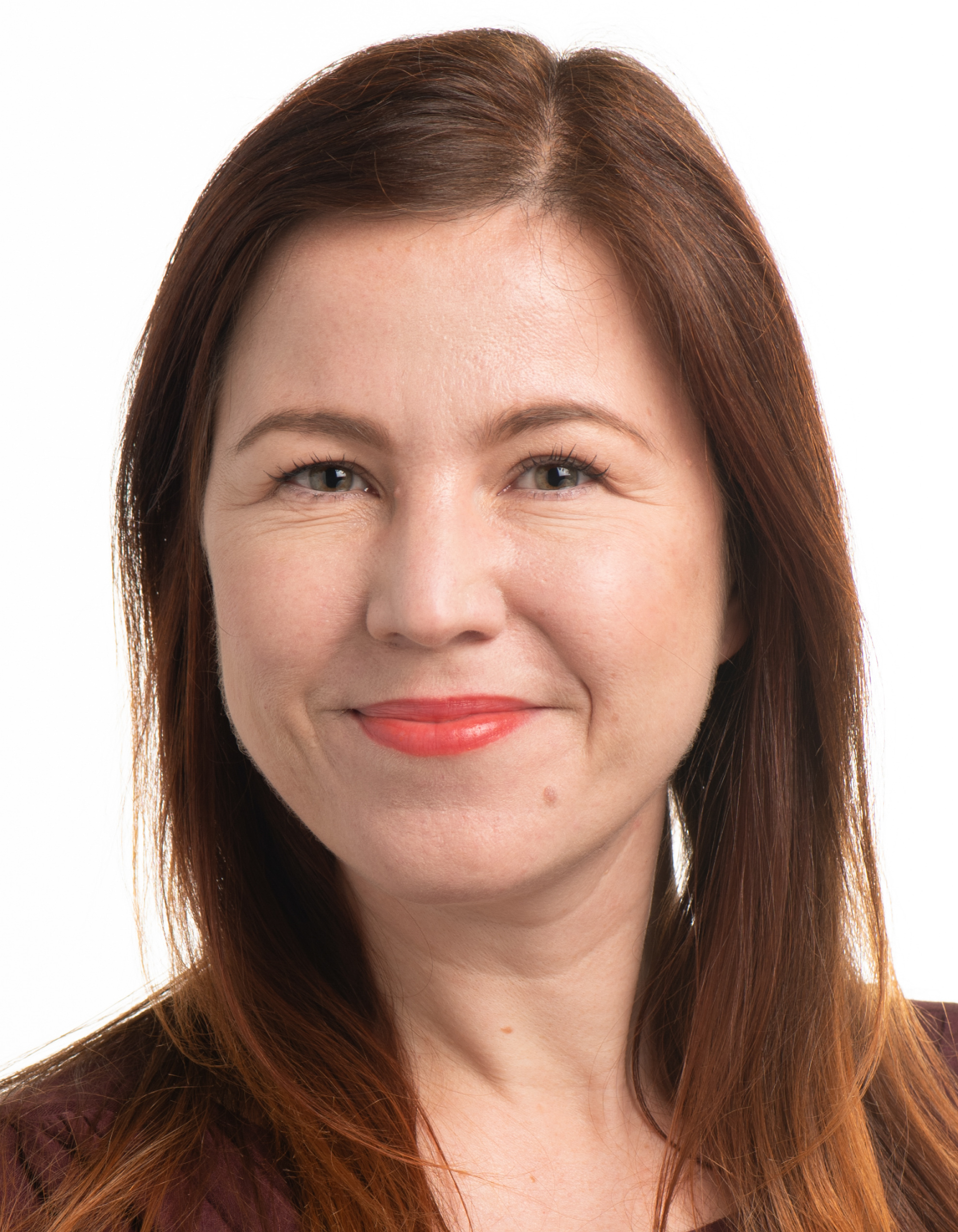

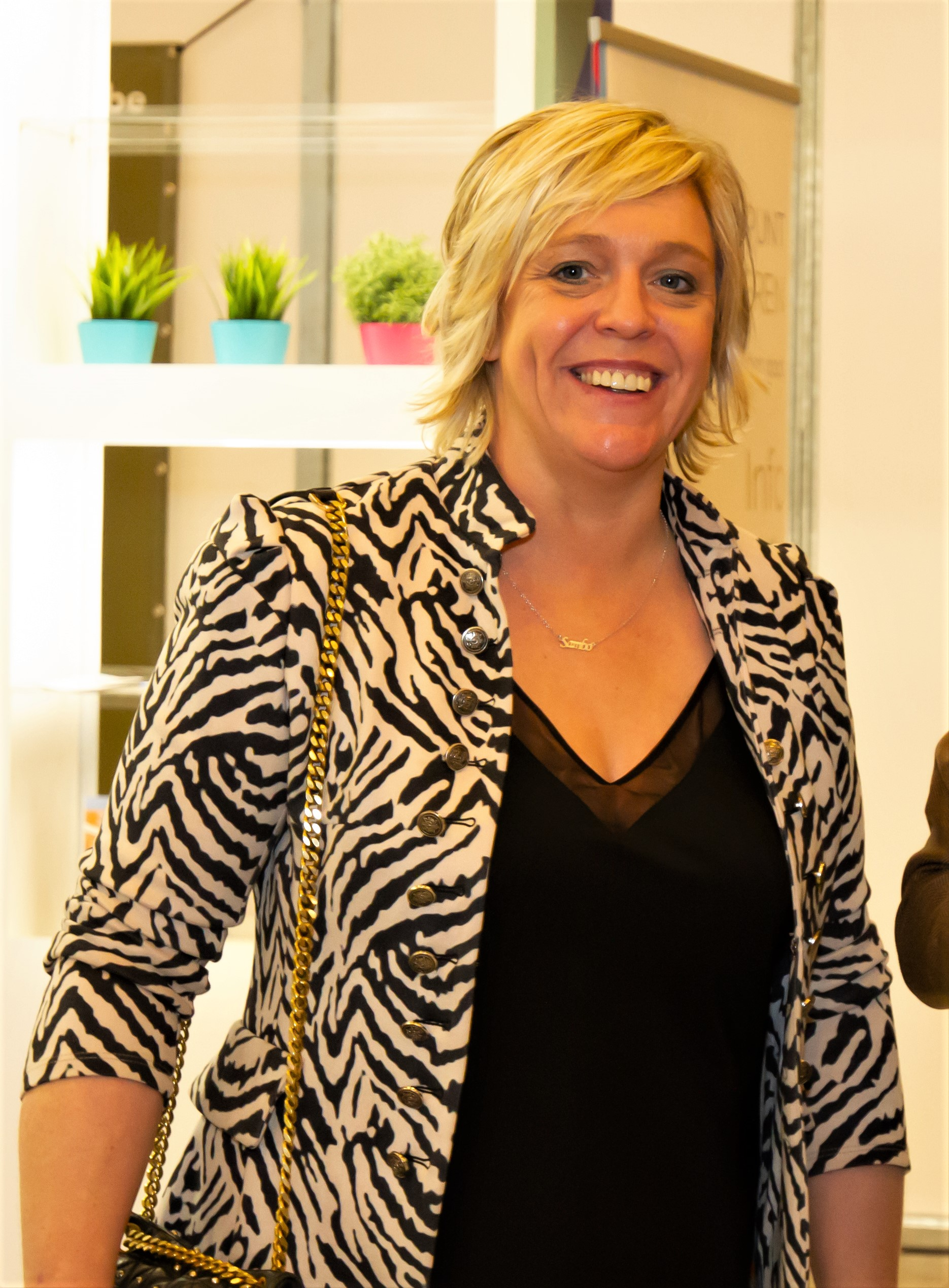
	First party	Second party	Third party
Leader	Tom Vandendriessche	Johan Van Overtveldt	Sophie Wilmès
Party	Vlaams Belang	N-VA	MR
Alliance	Patriots	ECR	RE
Last election	3 seats, 12.05%	3 seats, 14.17%	2 seats, 7.06%
Seats won	3	3	3
Seat change	0	0	▲1
Popular vote	1,034,112	995,868	906,304
Percentage	14.50%	13.96%	12.70%
Swing	▲2.45%	▼0.21%	▲5.64%
	Fourth party	Fifth party	Sixth party
Leader	Marc Botenga	Wouter Beke	Bruno Tobback
Party	PVDA-PTB	CD&V	Vooruit
Alliance	The Left	EPP	S&D
Last election	1 seats, 8.42%	2 seats, 9.17%	1 seat, 6.45%
Seats won	2	2	2
Seat change	▲1	0	▲1
Popular vote	763,340	594,968	570,067
Percentage	10.70%	8.34%	7.99%
Swing	▲2.28%	▼0.83%	▲1.54%
	Seventh party	Eighth party	Ninth party
Leader	Elio Di Rupo	Sara Matthieu	Hilde Vautmans
Party	PS	Groen	Open Vld
Alliance	S&D	Greens/EFA	RE
Last election	2 seats, 9.74%	1 seat, 7.81%	2 seats, 10.07%
Seats won	2	1	1
Seat change	0	0	▼1
Popular vote	534,828	450,781	410,743
Percentage	7.50%	6.32%	5.76%
Swing	▼2.24%	▼1.49%	▼4.31%

The 2024 European Parliament election in Belgium was held on 9 June 2024 in the three Belgian constituencies (the Dutch-speaking electoral college, the French-speaking electoral college and the German-speaking electoral college) to elect the Belgian delegation to the European Parliament. It is part of the 2024 European Parliament election and the 2024 Belgian elections. It was the tenth European Parliament election held in Belgium, and the first to take place after Brexit.

== Electoral system ==
Compared to last election, Belgium is entitled to one more MEP assigned in 2023 after a pre-election assessment of the Parliament composition based on the most recent population figures. Each constituency elects its members through semi-open list proportional representation with seats allocated through D'Hondt method and no electoral threshold. The 22 Belgian seats are divided among the three constituencies as follows:

- 13 MEPs to be elected by the Dutch-speaking electoral college (one more than in 2019)
- 8 MEPs to be elected by the French-speaking electoral college
- 1 MEP to be elected by the German-speaking electoral college

Both Belgian and other non-Belgian EU citizens residing in the country are entitled to vote in the European elections in Belgium. No registration is needed for Belgian citizens, while other EU citizens residing in Belgium need to register in the municipality of their residence no later than 31 March 2024. Belgian citizens residing abroad are required to register by 29 February 2024 to be able to vote from the country where they reside. This will be the first election in Belgium where people from the age of 16 have the right to vote. People aged 16 and above are obligated to vote. The electoral roll will be closed on 1 April 2024.

In order to participate in the election, proposed candidate lists must either be signed by at least five members of the Federal Parliament (House or Senate) or collect supporting signatures. For the latter option, 5000 signatures each are required for the Dutch and French-speaking electoral college and 200 for the German electoral college.

== Outgoing delegation ==
Belgian parties in the European Parliament in the ninth legislature (2019–2024)
Group	21	Dutch-speaking electoral college	12	French-speaking electoral college	8	German-speaking electoral college	1
EPP	4	Christian Democratic & Flemish (CD&V)	2	Humanist Democratic Centre (cdH)	1	Christian Social Party (CSP)	1
RE	4	Open Flemish Liberals and Democrats (Open VLD)	2	Reformist Movement (MR)	2		
ECR	3	New Flemish Alliance (N-VA)	3				
Greens-EFA	3	Groen	1	Ecolo	2		
ID	3	Vlaams Belang (VB)	3				
S&D	3	Socialist Party Differently (sp.a)	1	Socialist Party (PS)	2		
GUE/NGL	1			Workers' Party of Belgium (PTB)	1		

=== Retiring incumbents ===
Name	Party	EP Group	First elected	Terms	Date announced	Source
Geert Bourgeois	N-VA	ECR	2019	1	8 October 2021	
Guy Verhofstadt	Open Vld	RE	2009	3	8 May 2023	
Gerolf Annemans	Vlaams Belang	ID	2014	2	6 October 2023	

== Lead candidates ==
Lead candidates for the European Parliament election in Belgium in 2024
EP group	Dutch-speaking electoral college		French-speaking electoral college		German-speaking electoral college	
EP group	Party	Lead candidate	Party	Lead candidate	Party	Lead candidate
ECR	N-VA	Johan Van Overtveldt				
EPP	CD&V	Wouter Beke	Les Engagés	Yvan Verougstraete	CSP	Pascal Arimont
Greens-EFA	Groen	Sara Matthieu	Ecolo	Saskia Bricmont	Ecolo	Shqiprim Thaqi
GUE/NGL	PVDA	Rudi Kennes	PTB	Marc Botenga		
ID	VB	Tom Vandendriessche				
RE	Open VLD	Hilde Vautmans	MR	Sophie Wilmès	PFF-MR	Sacha Brandt
RE					Vivant	Alain Mertes
S&D	Vooruit	Bruno Tobback	PS	Elio Di Rupo	SP	Charles Servaty
none	Volt	Sophie in 't Veld				
none	VoorU	Marta Barandii				
none			DéFI	Fabrice Van Dorpe		
none			Anticapitalist Left	Denis Verstraeten		
none					ProDG	Liesa Scholzen

== Opinion polls ==
=== Dutch-speaking ===
Date(s) conducted	Polling firm	Publisher	Sample size	N‑VA ECR	VB ID	Open Vld Renew	cd&v EPP	Groen G/EFA	Vooruit S&D	PVDA Left	Others	Lead
23 Feb – 5 Mar 2024	Ipsos	Euronews	1,500	18.7% 3	23.5% 3	12.7% 2	11.5% 1	9.7% 1	13.8% 2	9.3% 1	0.8% 0	4.8%
26 May 2019	European election			22.4% 3	19.1% 3	15.9% 2	14.5% 2	12.4% 1	10.2% 1	4.9% 0	0.5% 0	3.3%

=== French-speaking ===
Date(s) conducted	Polling firm	Publisher	Sample size	PS S&D	Ecolo G/EFA	MR Renew	PTB Left	LE EPP	DéFI NI	Others	Lead
23 Feb – 5 Mar 2024	Ipsos	Euronews	1,500	26.7% 2	12.8% 1	22.8% 2	19.2% 2	11.0% 1	2.8% 0	4.7% 0	3.9%
26 May 2019	European election			26.7% 2	19.9% 2	19.3% 2	14.6% 1	8.9% 1	5.9% 0	4.7% 0	6.8%

== Results ==
Party		Votes	%	Seats	+/–
French-speaking electoral college
RE	Reformist Movement	900,413	34.88	3	▲1
S&D	Socialist Party	529,697	20.52	2	0
The Left	Workers' Party of Belgium	397,055	15.38	1	0
RE	The Committed Ones	368,668	14.28	1	0
G/EFA	Ecolo	259,745	10.06	1	▼1
NI	DéFI	75,243	2.91	0	0
NI	Anticapitalist Left	50,758	1.97	0	0
Total		2,581,579	100.00	8	0
Dutch-speaking electoral college
PfE	Flemish Interest	1,034,112	22.94	3	0
ECR	New Flemish Alliance	995,868	22.09	3	0
EPP	Christian Democratic and Flemish	594,968	13.20	2	0
S&D	Forward	570,067	12.64	2	▲1
G/EFA	Green	450,781	10.00	1	0
RE	Open Flemish Liberals and Democrats	410,743	9.11	1	▼1
The Left	Workers' Party of Belgium	366,285	8.12	1	▲1
NI	For You	47,243	1.05	0	New
NI	Volt Belgium	38,713	0.86	0	0
Total		4,508,780	100.00	13	▲1
German-speaking electoral college
EPP	Christian Social Party	15,169	34.93	1	0
NI	ProDG	7,134	16.43	0	0
RE	Perspectives. Freedom. Progress.	5,891	13.57	0	0
RE	Vivant	5,281	12.16	0	0
S&D	Socialist Party	5,131	11.82	0	0
G/EFA	Ecolo	4,819	11.10	0	0
Total		43,425	100.00	1	0
Valid votes		7,133,784	93.87		
Invalid/blank votes		465,974	6.13		
Total votes		7,599,758	100.00		
Registered voters/turnout		8,537,902	89.01		
Source: IBZ (in French, Dutch, and German);

=== Elected members ===
Party	Elected members
Dutch-speaking electoral college (13)
Vlaams Belang (3)	Tom Vandendriessche, Barbara Bonte, Gerolf Annemans
New Flemish Alliance (3)	Johan Van Overtveldt, Assita Kanko, Kris Van Dijck
Christian Democratic & Flemish (2)	Wouter Beke, Liesbet Sommen
Vooruit (2)	Bruno Tobback, Kathleen Van Brempt
Groen (1)	Sara Matthieu
Open Flemish Liberals and Democrats (1)	Hilde Vautmans
PVDA (1)	Rudi Kennes
French-speaking electoral college (8)
Reformist Movement (3)	Sophie Wilmès, Olivier Chastel, Benoît Cassart
Socialist Party (2)	Elio Di Rupo, Estelle Ceulemans
Workers' Party of Belgium (1)	Marc Botenga
The Committed Ones (1)	Yvan Verougstraete
Ecolo (1)	Saskia Bricmont
German-speaking electoral college (1)
Christian Social Party (1)	Pascal Arimont

=== European groups ===
From 2024 European Parliament election#Groups formed

Party	Seats	+/–
Renew Europe	5	+1
Progressive Alliance of Socialists and Democrats	4	+1
Patriots for Europe	3	0
European Conservatives and Reformists Group	3	0
European People's Party Group	3	–1
The Left in the European Parliament – GUE/NGL	2	+1
Greens–European Free Alliance	2	-1
Total	22	+1
