= Comac (youth movement) =

Youth wing of Workers' Party of Belgium

COMAC
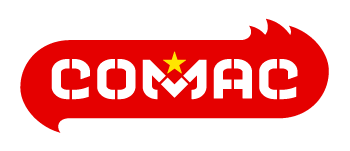
- Chairperson: Octave Daube
- Founded: 2002
- Headquarters: Bd Lemonnier 171, 1000, Brussels
- Ideology: Socialism; Marxism; Feminism; Anti-racism; LGBTQ activism
- Mother party: Workers' Party of Belgium
- International affiliation: World Federation of Democratic Youth
- Website: Official website (in French and Dutch); Official YouTube channel (in Dutch)

Comac is the student youth wing of the Belgian Marxist political party, the Workers' Party of Belgium (WPB), (known as PTB-PVDA in Belgium). The movement is active in 11 places across Belgium, operating in different cities, universities, as well as hogescholen. Comac's projects engage in political and symbolic movements, and it frequently hosts gatherings, protests, or other actions. The organization is bilingual, with Flemish and Walloon sections cooperating on a national level.

The student wing strives for a spectrum of social goals, such as a sustainable future, universal access to quality education, attention for mental health and climate action. Reversely, it opposes forms of discrimination, sexism, racism and aims to counteract the far-right. Comac envisions a radically democratic, social and diverse society. While being politically aligned to PVDA-PTB, Comac is autonomous in their affairs; it is not required to be a WPB-member to join Comac.

The organization has a joint movement, RedFox, for high school students.

== History ==
Comac originated in 2002 or 2003 as a merger of the Leninist MML-MLB (French: Mouvement marxiste-léniniste, Dutch: Marxistisch-Leninistische Beweging, "Marxist-Leninist Movement"), which was active at universities, and Rebelle or Rode Jeugd ("Red Youth"), which was active in secondary schools. The WPB's leading body (the Nationale Raad or Comité National) includes two Comac representatives. Internationally, Comac is or was a member of the World Federation of Democratic Youth (WFDY).

In April 2016, a split was made to demarcate between university students and younger members, as well as to represent the movement in high schools, leading to the creation of the sister movement RedFox.

The student wing's name originally stood for Communistes actifs or Communistes et actifs (Active Communists). This was later changed to a backronym (Change, Optimisme, Marxisme, Activisme, Creativiteit in Dutch and Changement, Optimisme, Marxisme, Activisme, Créativité in French) which reflects its stated goals:

- Change: Comac seeks to unite youth willing to stand up to injustice in society and fight to change the world;
- Optimism: hopefulness towards alternatives and a better world;
- Marxism: Comac sees Marx's ideas as a baseline to understand present-day capitalism and to create a new society;
- Activism: the student movement fights alongside climate activists, workers and trade unions;
- Creativity: change requires a broad movement independent of current dominant structures, to work on a new culture based on solidarity.

In 2018, Max Vancauwenberge was elected as national chairman, succeeding Charlie Le Paige, who had held the position for three years.

In 2022, internal documents of the youth organisation Schild & Vrienden, a far-right Flemish nationalist group, contained plans to infiltrate Comac and gain control from the inside-out, as well as secure influential positions in society. Comac chairman Max Vancauwenberge has strongly condemned these tactics, calling them "typical methods of fascist organisations: physical and digital intimidation, provocation and violence." Schild en Vrienden has been known to launch troll attacks on social media.

Sander Claessens was elected new chairman in November 2022, succeeding Max Vancauwenberge. Octave Daube was voted for vice chairman. Subsequently, in January 2026, Daube succeeded Claessens as chairman.

As of 2026, Comac has eleven chapters in nine cities (there are three separate chapters for different university campuses in Brussels): VUB, ULB, Leuven, Antwerp, Ghent, Saint-Louis, Louvain-la-Neuve, Mons, Namur, Charleroi and Liège.

=== List of chairpeople ===
Since 2009, the following people have been at the head of the movement:

- 2009–2014: Aurélie Decoene
- 2014–March 2018: Charlie Le Paige
- March 2018–November 2022: Max Vancauwenberge
- November 2022–January 2026: Sander Claessens
- January 2026–present: Octave Daube

== Activism ==
Comac is active via protests, direct action, and by manifesting in other symbolic events to support LGBT pride, women's rights, feminism and political action. Comac members have also volunteered for many solidarity actions, often jointly with other organizations and non-members, or in cooperation with the WPB or RedFox. These events aim to support disadvantaged groups, such as low-wage workers or refugees. The student wing furthermore has an online shop where stickers with messages can be purchased, such as against sexism and racism.

Comac members blocking the VBO's entrance, October 2021

=== Climate protests ===
Members from Comac have frequently participated in large-scale climate protests, as well its own actions to advocate for climate action, such as blockading the entrance of the VBO (pictured), a building representing polluting multinational corporations. Comac called for a more collective climate approach as well as investments in transport and public transit to make these carbon-neutral. The youth wing also criticizes the proposed carbon tax, opting for expansion on green energy alternatives as well as taxing polluting multinationals themselves.

The youth organisation has furthermore sent 200 members to Glasgow to demonstrate at the COP26 summit for climate action.

=== Anti-war protests ===
Comac and the WPB have organized and participated in pacifist rallies, calling on the Belgian government to discard military spending. The coalition government had approved over 12.2 billion euro in military allocation, meant to further purchase F-35s, frigates and drones, as well as fund more personnel and digital security.

Before the 2022 Russian invasion of Ukraine, Comac opposed escalation of the 2021–2022 Russo-Ukrainian crisis, as the movement has called on Russia and Ukraine to strive for peaceful and diplomatic dialogue. Since the invasion, Comac has attended peace protests and has directed actions in universities, such as an open letter and raising peace flags at campuses.

=== Students' action ===
In early 2022, during the exam period of the first semester, COVID-19 quarantine prevented students from multiple universities from attending their midterm examinations. Some were granted catch-up examinations, but these overlapped with existing exam dates, leading to multiple tests on a single day. Other catch-up tests were postponed for months, forcing students into re-taking them during the summer months. In response, Comac launched a petition to demand guaranteed catch-up exams right after the exam period for those affected by the mandatory COVID-19 isolation. As of the end of the midterms, around 2,000 had signed.

In February 2022, students from the Ghent University, VUB and KU Leuven reported cases of sexual harassment by professors. An associate professor was also fired in the Royal Conservatoire Antwerp. Comac has since joined a movement strongly denouncing their acts and demanding zero-tolerance for unacceptable behaviour. On 15 February, students across several Flemish cities protested, among which Comac members.

=== Disadvantaged groups ===
On 20 July 2021 (on World Refugee Day) Comac members demonstrated in support of undocumented migrants (sans-papiers) who organized a hunger strike for better regulations of their legal status. The youth wing has also provided supplies and food for refugees.

Following the Russian invasion of Ukraine and subsequent refugee crisis, the organization held actions at universities such as KU Leuven and UGent as part of a peace initiative. Comac wishes to mobilize Belgian universities in a call for de-escalation of the war and diplomatic resolution, as well as raise awareness for student refugees, many of whom faced discrimination while fleeing the country. Comac furthermore opposes Belgian weapon deliveries to Ukraine.

Comac also manifested in support of cleaning personnel, advocating for better working conditions and fairer salaries.

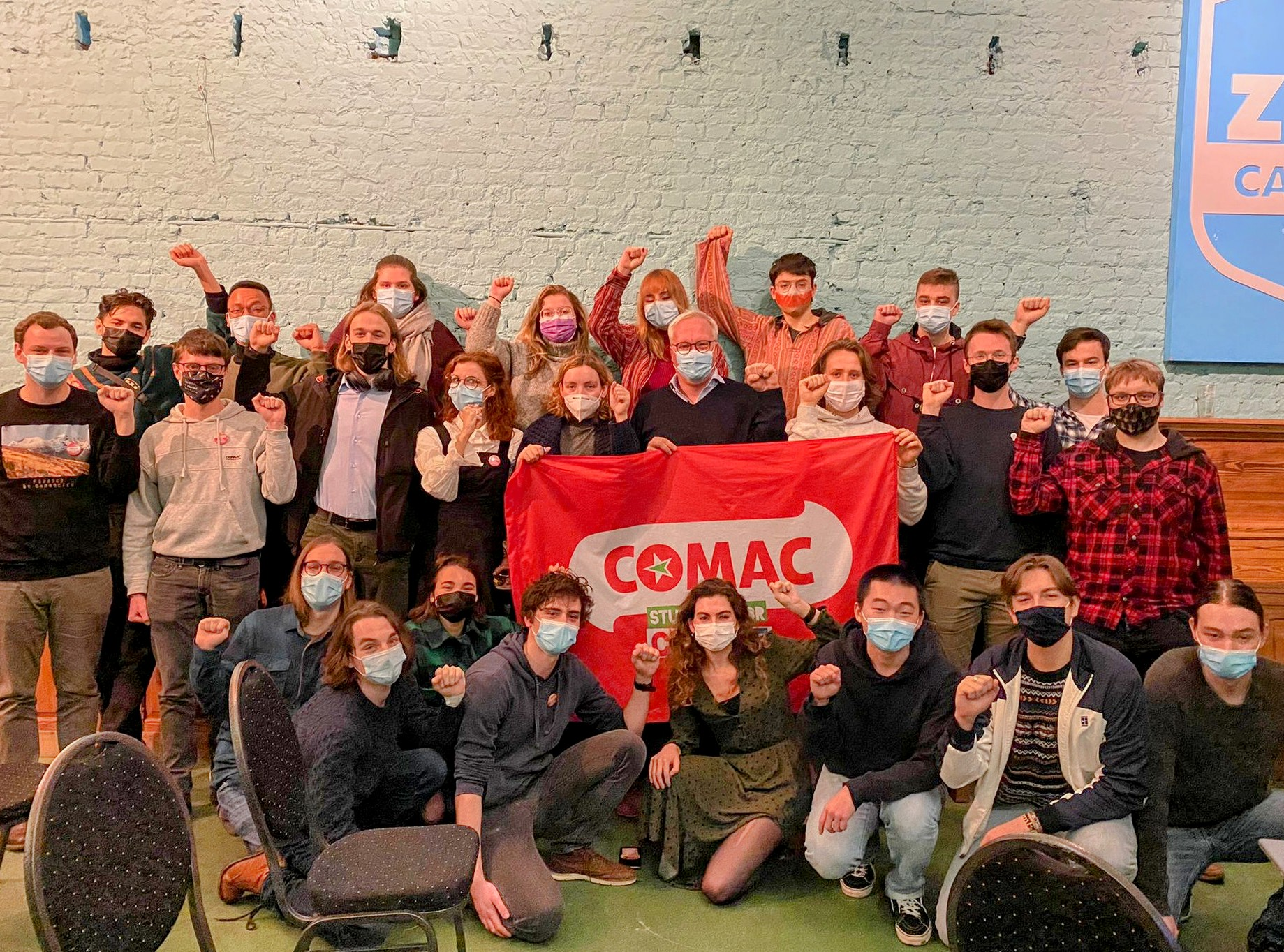
Comac members at a general member meeting with Peter Mertens (middle), December 2021.

=== Disaster relief ===
In cooperation with the WPB as well as RedFox, so-called SolidariTeams were created to help victims of the 2021 European floods in Flanders and Wallonia, many of which needed their houses rid of debris, the interior cleaned and repainted, as well as their basements drained. Around 41,000 households were left without electricity in Wallonia. Since 2022, over 1,500 people have volunteered for the program. In 2024, Comac sent a delegation of about 35 students to help clean up and help the local inhabitants after the floods in Valencia.

== Sociocultural activities ==
Comac also host a many events for members and non-members, some of which return yearly.

- Week of Solidarity: during summer, a week-long set of activities, under which camping, playing games, teambuilding and workshops. Usually, guest speakers from trade unions or the PVDA-PTB come to speak.
- Solidarity journey: a travel project where members head to (oftentimes conflicted) regions to connect with local organizations, learn about the situation, and speak to locals. During past journeys, members have been to Greece, the contested Palestine, Kerala and Cuba. Comac broadly supports the Cuban government for its socialist outlook, social programs and achievements, and anti-imperialist position vis-a-vis the United States embargo.
- Karl Marx School: a two-day workshop for beginners to read, discuss, debate and learn about Marxism and derivative views.
- General member meetings: meetings are hosted across cities, often as presentations, where recent developments are discussed, members are elected for positions, activities are planned, or a guest speaker gives a talk. New members can attend these gatherings as well.
- Basis group: members across Comac join a basisgroep, usually clustered by their location or studies, which hold weekly meetings to review and learn about recent events, and discuss and coordinate actions.
- Collective study: people are invited to a collectieve blok, aiming to study intensively over the course of five days. A roster is planned, such that attendants study in chunks of time with breaks in between. Depending on the type of blok organized, it is either complimentary or with a fee.

Comac also participates in outside events, such as the World Festival of Youth and Students or the yearly ManiFiesta, a two-day concert in Belgium featuring world music and hip hop, guest speakers, debates, workshops and bookshops.

== Relations ==
Comac connects with intranational movements as well as foreign organizations. It has ties with other socialist youth wings as the Dutch Communist Youth Movement (CYM) and French Mouvement Jeunes Communistes de France and is a member of the World Federation of Democratic Youth. Intranationally, it has ties with several feminist, anti-fascist, pacifist and volunteer movements. Comac also works with a multitude of peace movements, such as Pax Christi and the Belgian Vrede vzw and Hart Boven Hard. Comac also seeks close cooperation with Belgian civil society organizations.

== RedFox ==
RedFox
- Chairman: Alice Verlinden
- Founded: 2015
- Headquarters: Bd Lemonnier 171, 1000, Brussels
- Ideology: Feminism; Gender equality LGBT activism Anti-racism
- Mother party: Workers' Party of Belgium
- Website: RedFox official website (in French and Dutch)

The WPB is home to a second youth wing, RedFox, for people between 14 and 18 years of age. The organization was founded in 2015. Much like Comac, it engages in solidarity actions and political movements as anti-racism, anti-sexism, climate movement, gender equality and LGBT support.

== See also ==
- LGBTQA+
- World Federation of Democratic Youth
- Socialism and LGBT rights
