= 2019 European Parliament election in Belgium =

← 2014	26 May 2019	2024 →

All 21 Belgian seats to the European Parliament
- Turnout: 88.47%
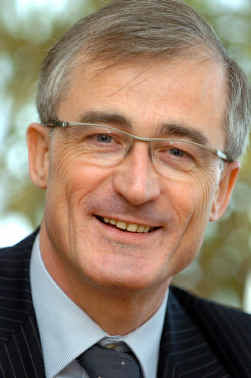

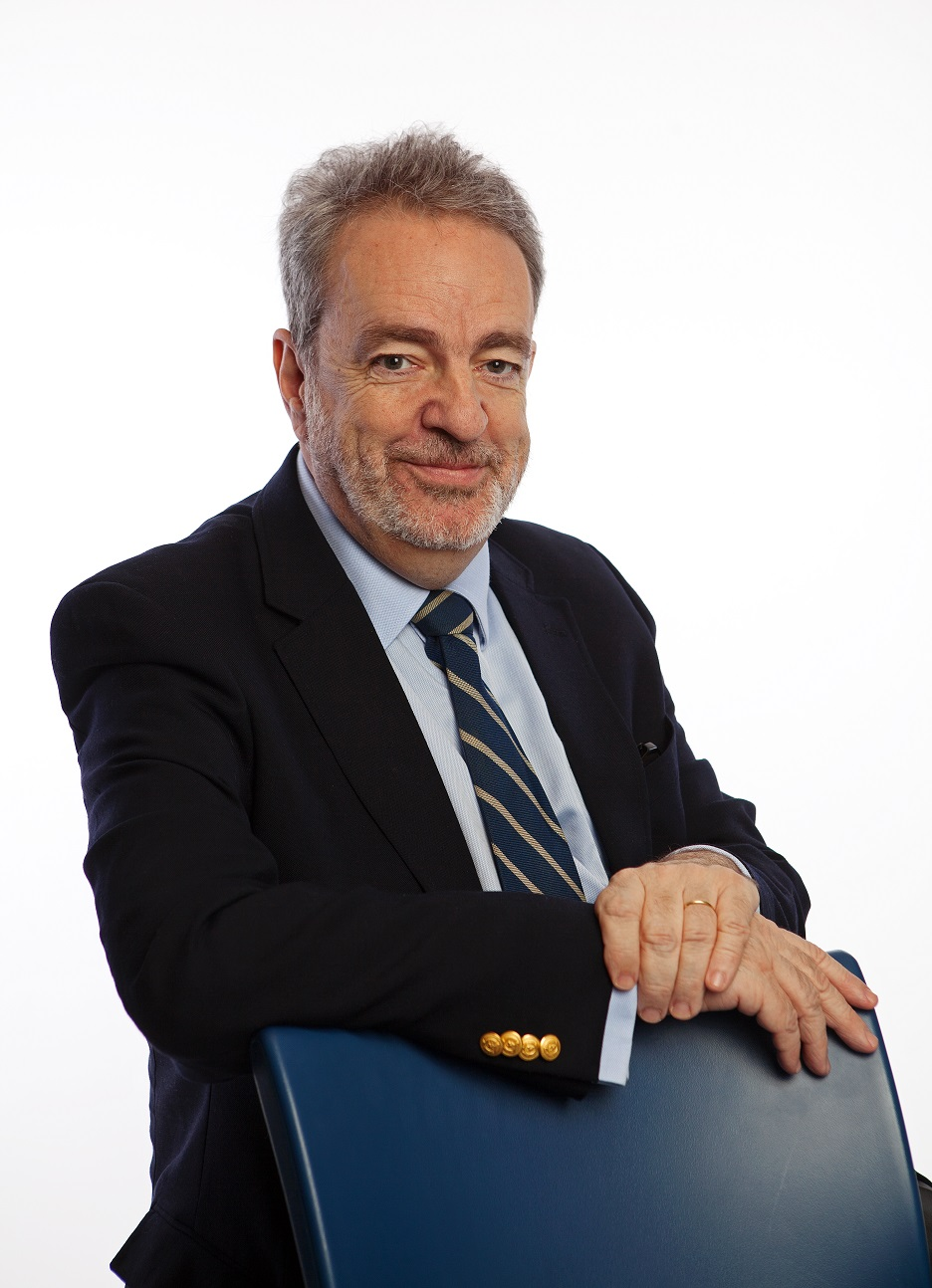

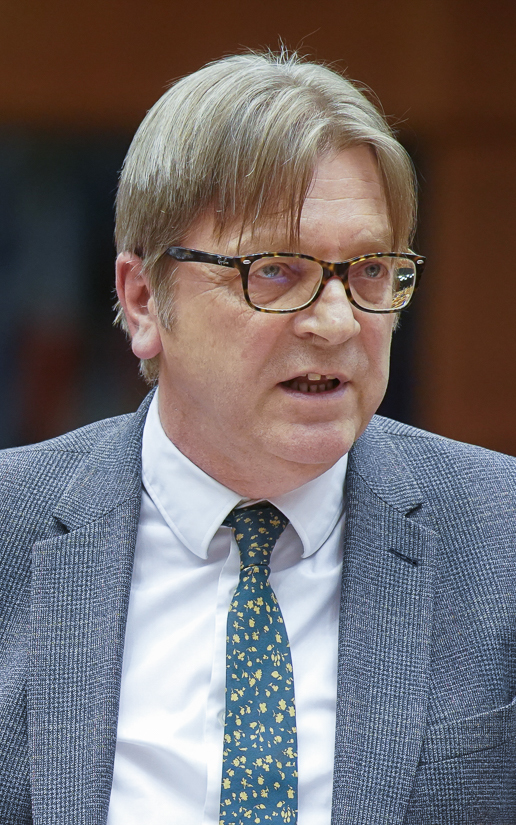

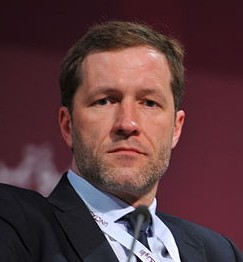

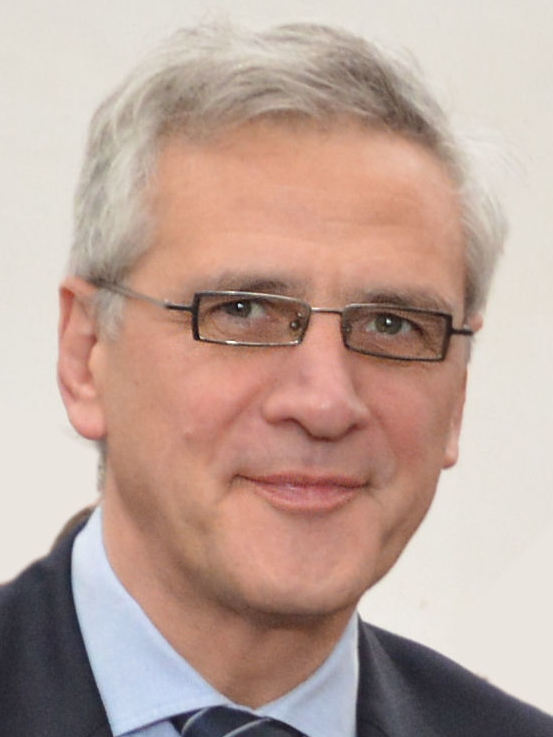

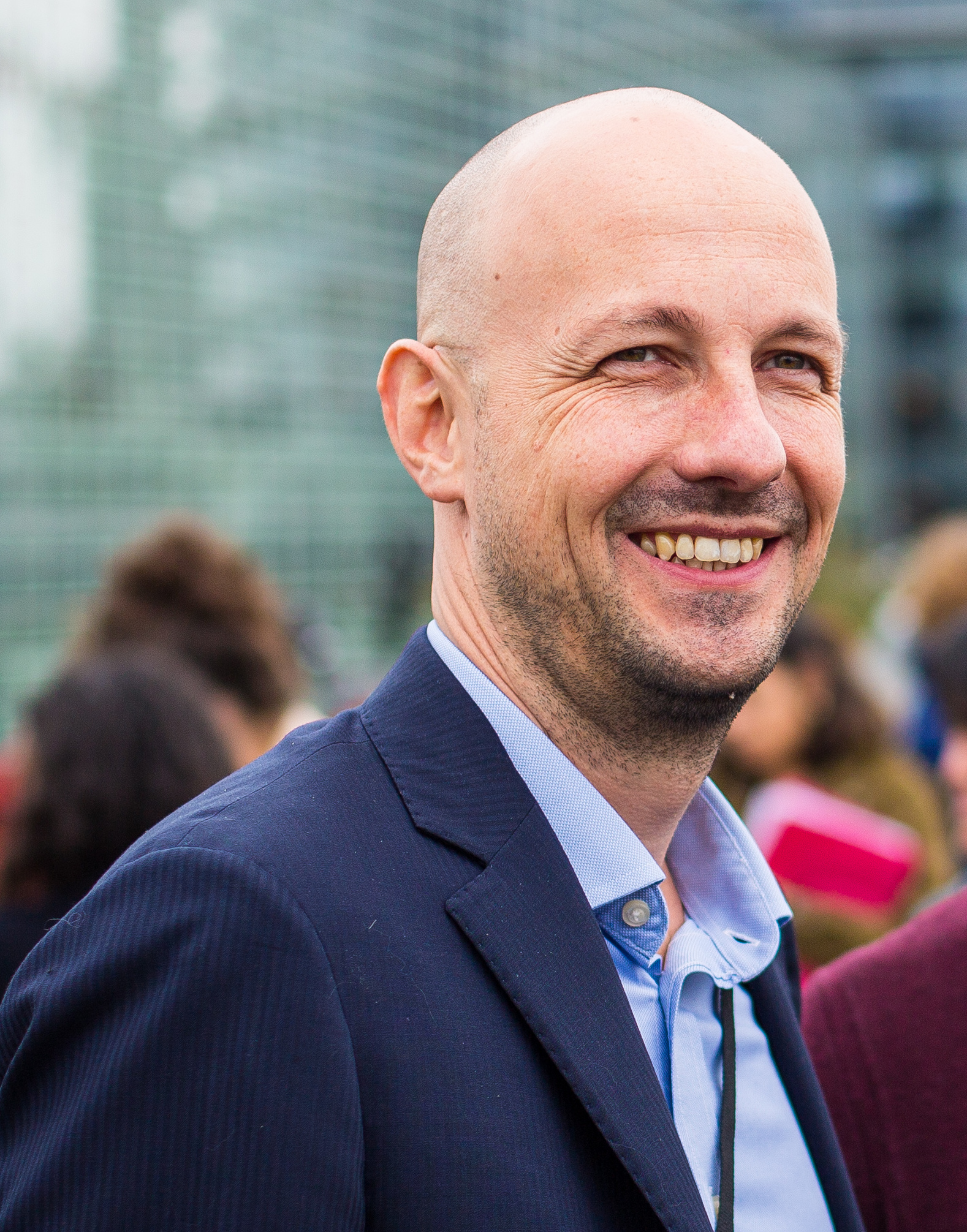

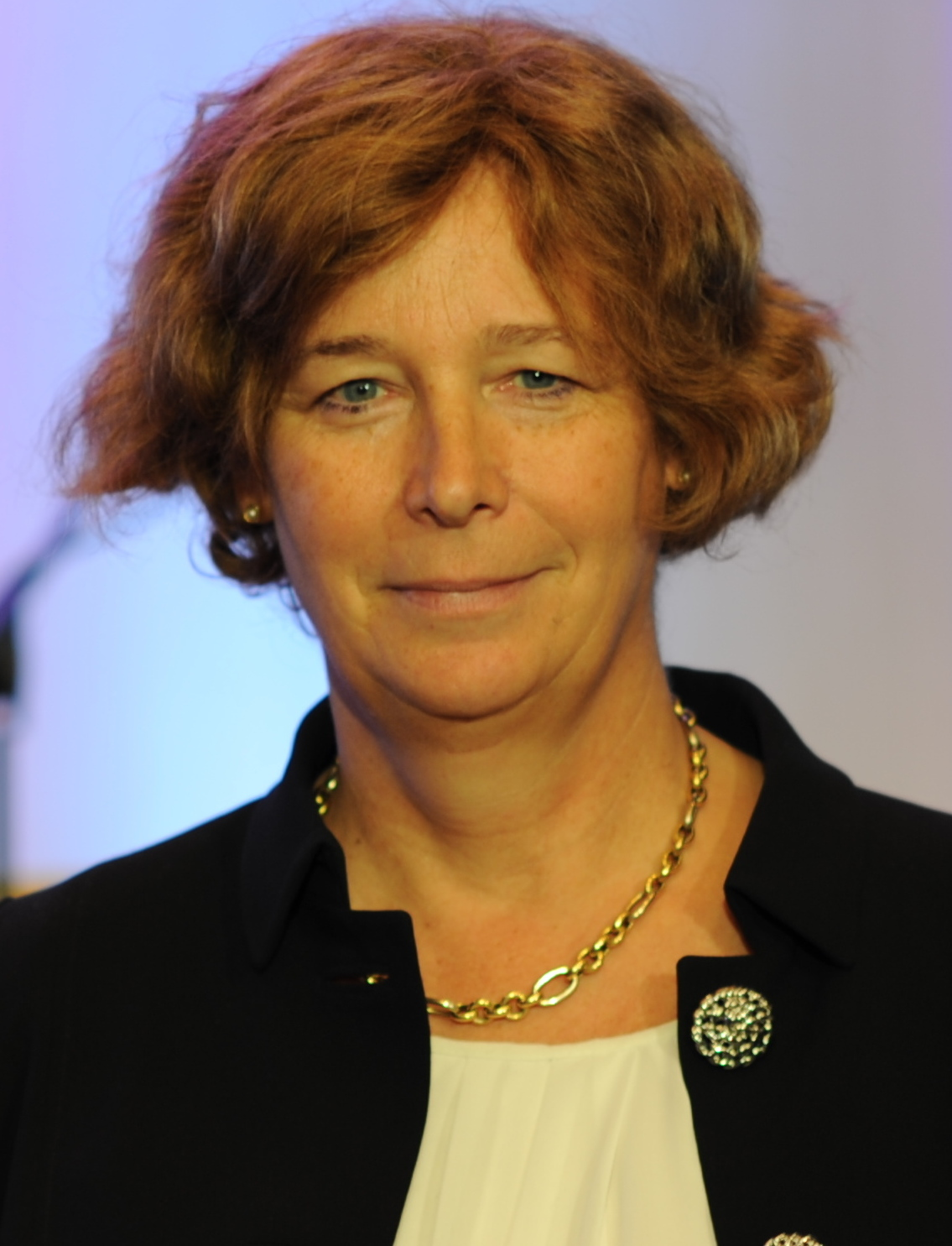

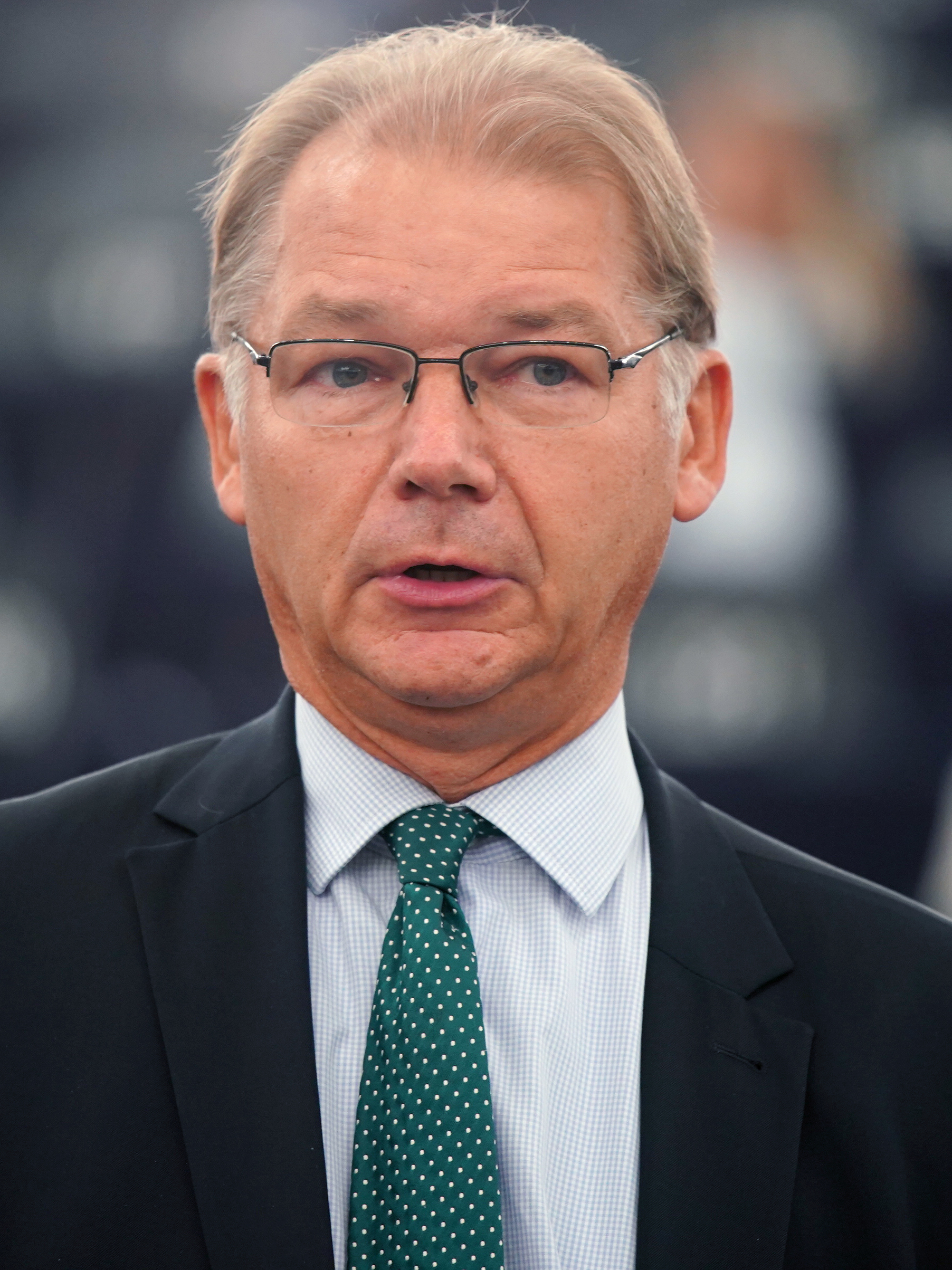

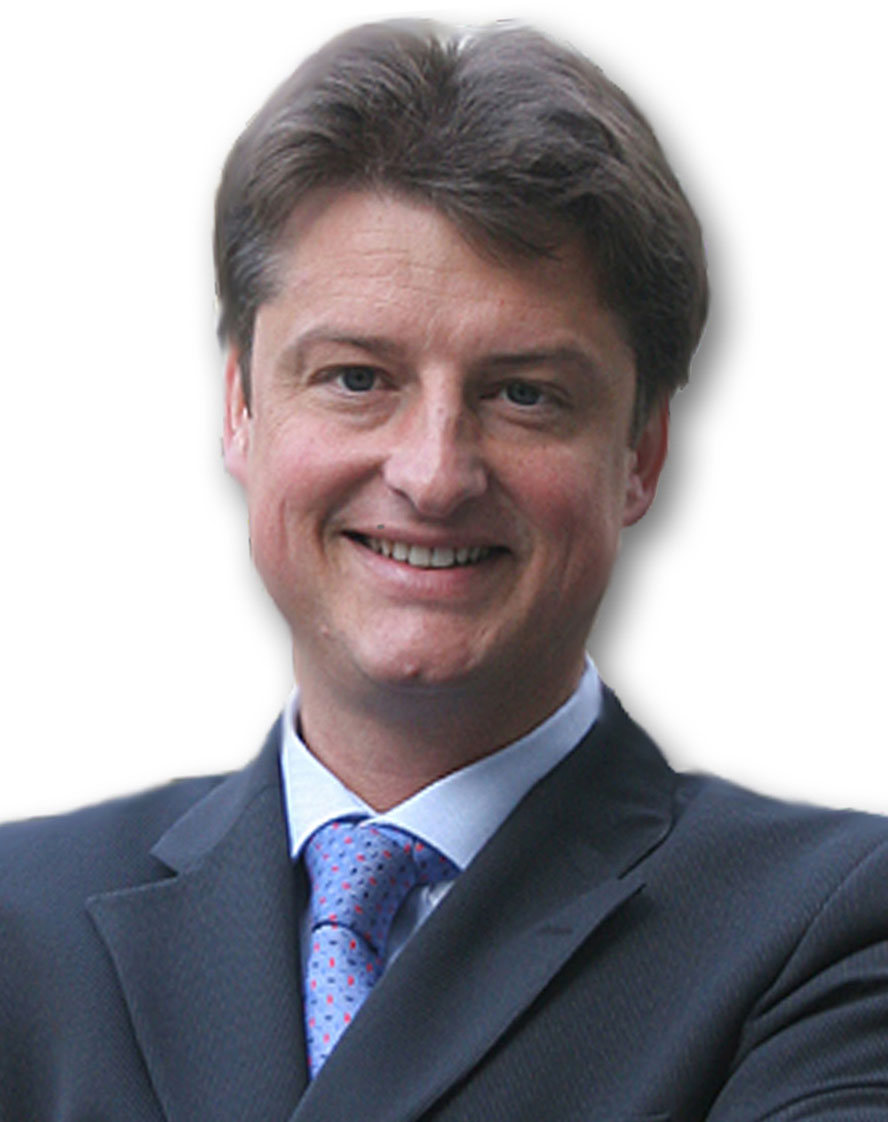
	First party	Second party	Third party
Leader	Geert Bourgeois	Gerolf Annemans	Guy Verhofstadt
Party	N-VA	Vlaams Belang	Open Vld
Alliance	ECR	ID	ALDE
Last election	4 seats, 16.79%	1 seat, 4.26%	3 seats, 12.84%
Seats won	3	3	2
Seat change	▼1	▲2	▼1
Popular vote	954,048	811,169	678,051
Percentage	14.17%	12.05%	10.07%
Swing	▼2.62%	▲7.79%	▼2.77%
	Fourth party	Fifth party	Sixth party
Leader	Paul Magnette	Kris Peeters	Marc Botenga
Party	PS	CD&V	PVDA-PTB
Alliance	PES	EPP	GUE/NGL
Last election	3 seats, 10.68%	2 seats, 12.57%	0 seats, 3.51%
Seats won	2	2	1
Seat change	▼1	0	▲1
Popular vote	655,812	617,651	566,274
Percentage	9.74%	9.17%	8.42%
Swing	▼0.94%	▼3.39%	▲4.91%
	Seventh party	Eighth party	Ninth party
Leader	Petra De Sutter	Philippe Lamberts	Olivier Chastel
Party	Groen	Ecolo	MR
Alliance	European Greens	European Greens	ALDE
Last election	1 seat, 6.69%	1 seat, 4.26%	3 seats, 9.88%
Seats won	1	2	2
Seat change	0	▲1	▼1
Popular vote	525,908	492,330	475,338
Percentage	7.81%	7.31%	7.06%
Swing	▲1.13%	▲2.95%	▼2.92%

An election was held on 26 May 2019 in the three Belgian constituencies (the Dutch-speaking electoral college, the French-speaking electoral college and the German-speaking electoral college) to elect the Belgian delegation to the European Parliament. It was part of the 2019 European Parliament election.

A royal order of 15 June 2018 fixed the date of the European Parliament election in Belgium, following an agreement at European level. Per the Belgian Constitution, the Belgian regional elections, and additionally the Belgian federal election because no snap election occurred, were automatically held on the same day.

Marianne Thyssen, who was re-elected Member of the European Parliament in 2014 as lijsttrekker for CD&V and who subsequently became European Commissioner, announced in July 2018 that she would quit politics in 2019.

== Electoral system ==
Dutch-speaking electoral college (12 MEPs) French-speaking electoral college (8 MEPs) German-speaking electoral college (1 MEP)

As the reapportionment after Brexit did not impact the number of seats allocated to Belgium, 21 MEPs were elected in Belgium, as in the 2014 election. One of them is by law allocated to the German-speaking electoral college and the remaining ones are allocated to the Dutch-speaking and to the French-speaking electoral college in accordance with a population formula, giving them respectively twelve and eight seats, as in 2014.

Voters could only vote on the lists depending on the language area they live in. This means that in the bilingual arrondissement of Brussels-Capital, voters could choose whether to vote for the Dutch-speaking or for the French-speaking electoral college. There was an exception to this rule for the six municipalities with language facilities in the Brussels Periphery, whose inhabitants could also opt to vote for French-speaking lists despite being in the Dutch language area.

Seats were allocated according to the D'Hondt method in each of the three electoral colleges; however, the German-speaking electoral college de facto used a first-past-the-post system, since it elected only one MEP. The electoral threshold was 5%, which was based on the vote share per electoral college rather than nationally.

All Belgian citizens aged 18 or over and residing in Belgium were obligated to participate in the election.

Other EU citizens residing in Belgium as well as Belgians living in another EU member state had the right to vote on Belgian lists in European Parliament elections. The law of 17 November 2016 extended this right to Belgians living in a non-EU member state, which was already possible for federal elections.

== Results ==
Party	Votes	%	Seats
French-speaking electoral college
Socialist Party	651,157	26.69	2
Ecolo	485,655	19.91	2
Reformist Movement	470,654	19.29	2
Workers' Party of Belgium	355,883	14.59	1
Humanist Democratic Centre	218,078	8.94	1
DéFI	144,555	5.92	0
People's Party	113,793	4.66	0
Total	2,439,775	100.00	8
Dutch-speaking electoral college
New Flemish Alliance	954,048	22.44	3
Vlaams Belang	811,169	19.08	3
Open Flemish Liberals and Democrats	678,051	15.95	2
Christian Democratic and Flemish	617,651	14.53	2
Green	525,908	12.37	1
Socialist Party Differently	434,002	10.21	1
Workers' Party of Belgium	210,391	4.95	0
Volt Belgium	20,385	0.48	0
Total	4,251,605	100.00	12
German-speaking electoral college
Christian Social Party	14,247	34.94	1
Ecolo	6,675	16.37	0
ProDG	5,360	13.14	0
Party for Freedom and Progress–Reformist Movement	4,684	11.49	0
Socialist Party	4,655	11.42	0
Vivant	4,550	11.16	0
DierAnimal	606	1.49	0
Total	40,777	100.00	1
Valid votes	6,732,157	93.68	
Invalid/blank votes	454,520	6.32	
Total votes	7,186,677	100.00	
Registered voters/turnout	8,122,985	88.47	
Source: Belgian Elections

=== Elected members ===
Party	Elected members
Dutch-speaking electoral college (12)
New Flemish Alliance (3)	Geert Bourgeois, Assita Kanko, Johan Van Overtveldt
Vlaams Belang (3)	Gerolf Annemans, Filip De Man, Tom Vandendriessche
Open Flemish Liberals and Democrats (2)	Guy Verhofstadt, Hilde Vautmans
Christian Democratic & Flemish (2)	Kris Peeters, Cindy Franssen
Groen (1)	Petra De Sutter
Socialist Party Differently (1)	Kathleen Van Brempt
French-speaking electoral college (8)
Socialist Party (2)	Marie Arena, Marc Tarabella
Ecolo (2)	Philippe Lamberts, Saskia Bricmont
Reformist Movement (2)	Olivier Chastel, Frédérique Ries
Workers' Party of Belgium (1)	Marc Botenga
Humanist Democratic Centre (1)	Benoît Lutgen
German-speaking electoral college (1)
Christian Social Party (1)	Pascal Arimont

=== Groups ===
From 2019 European Parliament election#Groups

Alliance	Seats
European People's Party (EPP)	4
Renew Europe (RE)	4
Progressive Alliance of Socialists and Democrats (S&D)	3
Identity and Democracy (ID)	3
European Conservatives and Reformists (ECR)	3
Greens–European Free Alliance (Greens/EFA)	3
European United Left–Nordic Green Left (GUE/NGL)	1
Non-Inscrits	0

== Outgoing delegation ==
Belgian parties in the European Parliament in the eighth legislature (2014–2019)
Group	21	Dutch-speaking electoral college	12	French-speaking electoral college	8	German-speaking electoral college	1
ALDE	6	Open Flemish Liberals and Democrats (Open VLD)	3	Reformist Movement (MR)	3		
ECR	4	New Flemish Alliance (N-VA)	4				
S&D	4	Socialist Party Differently (sp.a)	1	Socialist Party (PS)	3		
EPP	4	Christian Democratic & Flemish (CD&V)	2	Humanist Democratic Centre (cdH)	1	Christian Social Party (CSP)	1
Greens-EFA	2	Groen	1	Ecolo	1		
ENF	1	Vlaams Belang (VB)	1				
