= Laure Lekane =

Belgian politician (born 1989)

Laure Lekane (born 5 November 1989) is a worker and politician from Belgium. She serves in the Parliament of Wallonia, Parliament of the French Community and the Senate of Belgium as a member of the Workers Party of Belgium.

== Biography ==
Lekane studied social work at the Haute École de la Province de Liège and worked as a social worker for a business in Hauts-Sarts. Lekane joined the Workers' Party of Belgium at the end of the 2000s and since 2017 has served as the leader of the local party in Oupeye.

In the 2018 local elections, Lekane was elected a communal council for Oupeye.

In the 2019 regional elections, Lekane was elected to the Parliament of Wallonia for Liège. As part of her position, Lekane also sits in the Parliament of the French Community of Belgium. She was chosen by the French Community Parliament to sit as a member of the Senate.

On 17 March 2020 Lekane, along with the other members of the Workers' Party, refused to vote for a bill proposed by Wallon Prime Minister Elio Di Rupo that would give him special powers to help combat the ongoing COVID-19 pandemic in Belgium, saying that it was not necessary for the Prime Minister to have special authority.
