= Volt Belgium =

Volt Belgium Volt Belgien Volt België Volt Belgique
- Abbreviation: Volt
- Leader: Emeric Massaut
- Secretary: Bram Vandeninden
- Founded: 28 July 2018; 8 years ago
- Headquarters: Brussels
- Ideology: Social liberalism; Pro-Europeanism; European federalism
- European political alliance: Volt Europa
- Colours: Purple

Website
- https://www.voltbelgium.org/

National sections of Volt Europa. The borders of the European Union are shown in red.

Volt Belgium (short name: Volt, Dutch: Volt België, French: Volt Belgique, German: Volt Belgien) is a political party in Belgium. It is part of Volt Europa, a progressive and federalist European political alliance.

== Policies ==
As part of the pan-European movement Volt Europa, the party aims to solve current challenges and issues such as climate change, migration and unemployment through closer European cooperation. The party advocates for citizen participation and more transparency in politics. The programme focuses on democratic reforms, climate change and the creation of healthy ecosystems, the strengthening of social and labour rights and the consolidation of the EU in both economic and foreign policy terms.

=== European policy ===
The party aims to create a federal, united Europe. To do this, the party wants to strengthen the European Parliament and a European government and a European Prime Minister.

=== Defence policy ===
In order to increase the efficiency of defence procurement, the party is striving for closer cooperation and joint procurement in the European Union.

=== Transparency ===
The party is in favour of measures to increase the transparency of political processes. In particular, it favours publicly available data. It also calls for more commitment to fighting corruption and measures to regulate lobbying activities. It also proposes warning systems and infringement procedures to combat violations of fundamental freedoms.

=== Immigration and asylum policy ===
Volt is in favour of a reform of immigration policy with a focus on integration that ensures "humane treatment.

== History ==
Volt has been active in Belgium since 2017 and was officially founded as a party on 28 July 2018. The then 19-year-old Arno Sterck was elected chairman. It was the first national section of the paneuropean movement to participate in an election. In April 2022, the party elected the German-French Johanna Dirlewanger-Lücke and the German-Italian Carlo Giovanni Giudiceneue as new party leaders.

At its election congress in October 2023, the party chose Sophie in 't Veld for the Dutch-speaking electoral body and Suzana Carp for the French-speaking electoral body as its top candidates.

In April 2024, a previously independent councillor from Lebbeke joined the party, giving Volt its first mandate in Belgium.

== Elections ==
=== 2019 ===
The party participated in the 2018 municipal elections in Ixelles (0,58 %) and Etterbeek (1,58 %), and on a list with the local Pirate Party in Antwerp.

In the 2019 European Parliament election, Volt only participated in the Dutch-language electoral college and received 0.48% of the vote.

In the 2019 Belgian parliamentary election, Volt participated in the Antwerp constituency and received 1669 votes, representing 0.14 % of the vote in the constituency and 0.02 % of the vote nationally.

=== 2024 ===
The party took part in the European elections in the Dutch, with lead candidates Sophie in 't Veld and Bram Vandeninden, a Dutch MEP who had defected from the Democrats 66 party in the Netherlands. Despite the relatively high-profile lead candidate, Volt Belgium received 0.86% of the Dutch-speaking electoral college vote, or 38,713 votes, coming in last amongst the available lists.

The party also took part in the national parliamentary elections and the regional elections in Brussels and Flanders.

- In the Federal election, Volt Belgium participated in 2 circumscriptions (Brussels and Antwerp) and received 7,245 votes or 0.10% of the total votes.
- In the elections for the Flemish parliament, Volt Belgium participated 2 circumscription (Antwerp and Brabant) and received 7,678 votes or 0.18% of the vote.
- In the Brussels regional election (in the French linguistic group), they received 1,531 votes, or 0.39% of the vote.
- In the Brussels regional election (in the Dutch linguistic group), they received 569 votes or 0,71 % of the vote.

No Volt Belgium candidates were elected in any of these elections.

In October 2024, Volt Belgium also took party in several local municipal elections as well as in provincial elections across Flanders. In Tervuren, Tracey D'Afters became the first elected representative from Volt Belgium. She was elected as a municipal councilor in a joint list with Tervuren Unie, called "Tervuren Unie + Volt".

== Organisation ==
The party is led by a dual leadership of a man and a woman.

== Finances ==
For transparency reasons, the party has committed itself to publishing all donations exceeding 500 euros on its website.

Volt spent 100 euros on social media advertising on Facebook and Instagram in 2021, and 250 euros in 2022.

== Election results ==
=== Chamber of Representatives ===
Election	Leader	Votes	%	Seats	+/−	Government
2019	Jordy Vanpoucke; Olivia ten Horn	1,669	0.02	0 / 150	New	Extra-parliamentary
2024	Carlo Giovanni Giudice; Johanna Dirlewanger-Lücke	7,245	0.10	0 / 150	0	Extra-parliamentary

=== European Parliament ===
Election	List leader	Votes	%		Seats	+/−	EP Group
Election	List leader	Votes	D.E.C.	Overall	Seats	+/−	EP Group
2019	Christophe Calis	20,385	0.48 (#8)	0.30	0 / 21	New	−
2024	Sophie in 't Veld	38,713	0.86 (#9)	0.54	0 / 22	0	−
