= Rudi Kennes =

Belgian trade unionist and politician

Rudi Kennes MEP
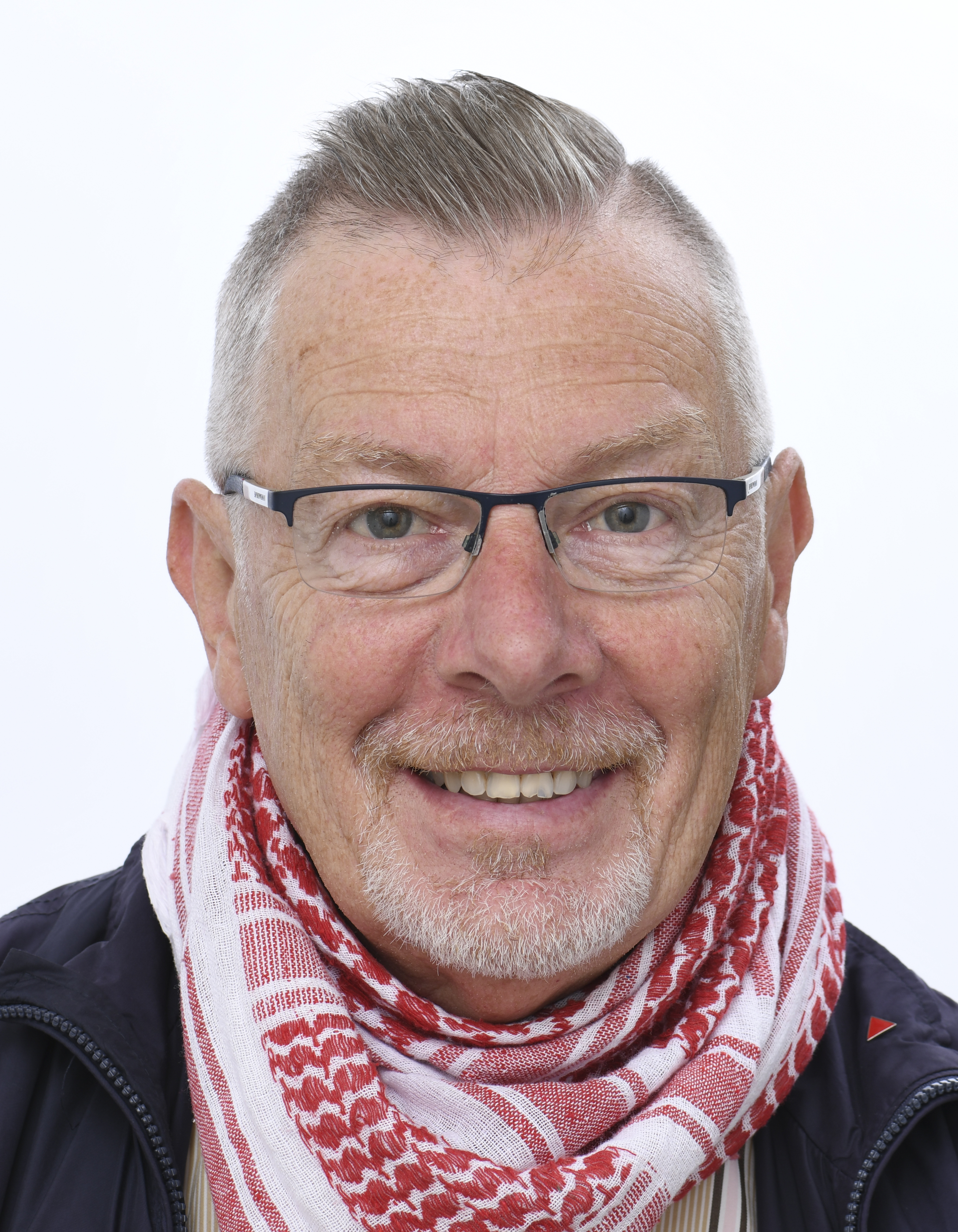
- Kennes in 2022

Member of the European Parliament for Belgium
- Incumbent
- Assumed office 9 June 2024
- Constituency: Dutch-speaking electoral college

Member of the Willebroek City Council
- In office 1 January 2013 – 14 October 2018

Personal details
- Born: 22 July 1959 (age 67) Boom, Belgium
- Party: Belgium: Independent (2025–present) (European Union) EU: The Left – GUE/NGL
- Other political affiliations: Vooruit (2007–2018); Workers' Party of Belgium (2021–2025)
- Spouse: Karima Esbaï

Rudi Kennes (born 22 July 1959) is a Belgian trade unionist and politician.

== Biography ==
Kennes was born in Niel and grew up in a working-class family in Boom. At 15, he started working as a metal worker.

In 1978 he began working at the large automobile factory Opel Antwerp, where he became a member of the works council in 1983. Between 2005 and 2011 he was chief union representative at Opel Antwerp for the ABVV metal workers union and between 2006 and 2011 Kennes was vice president of the General Motors European Works Council.

During that period GM began a restructuring, and the closing of Opel Antwerp was proposed in 2009. The unions at Opel Antwerp unsuccessfully resisted these plans and in early 2010 the company definitively decided to close the factory, causing 2600 workers to lose their jobs. As chief union rep, Kennes became the public face of the struggle to keep the factory open and was recognized as "Flanders' best-known union representative".

Kennes was a candidate in the 2007 Belgian federal election for sp.a in Antwerp. As a popular trade unionists, he was offered a place on the sp.a list for the 2009 regional election in Flanders, but he refused the spot. He was once again on the list for the 2010 federal election.

Between 2013 and 2018 Kennes served as municipal council member for sp.a in Willebroek. After the 2018 local elections, he left sp.a, but because elected member Griet Reyntiens left the council, Kennes re-entered in 2021, first as an independent and then as a member of the Workers' Party of Belgium (PVDA). In the meantime, Kennes had begun working as parliamentary assistant to PVDA's Gaby Colebunders.

Kennes was the Workers' Party's lead candidate in the 2024 European Parliament elections for Belgium's Dutch-language constituency. He was elected into the European Parliament on June 9, the first Marxist MEP from Flanders. The party maintained its seat from the French-language constituency, held by Marc Botenga, and so doubled its representation.

On 7 March 2025, his French-speaking colleague announced that he was leaving the PTB but would continue to sit in The LEFT parliamentary group. No details of the reason for his resignation from the party were given.
