= Stéphanie Koplowicz =

Belgian politician (born 1977)

Stéphanie Koplowicz (born 16 May 1977 in Uccle) is a Belgian politician, currently sitting in the French Community Commission with the Workers' Party of Belgium.

She holds a bachelor's degree in arts and has a son who is disabled.

Koplowicz served as a marketing assistant for Randstad from 1999 to 2000. Afterwards, she worked in a number of different jobs, including independent journalism, translation, casting assistant, and from 2011 to 2012, as a consultant for the city of Schaerbeek.

== Political career ==
Koplowicz was elected as a municipal councillor in Forest on the PTB list in the 2018 Belgian local elections. During the campaign, one of her posters was targeted by neo-Nazi vandalism.

In the 2019 Belgian regional elections, she was elected to the French Community Commission, the francophone authority of the Brussels-Capital Region. She was named head of the Workers' Party of Belgium caucus on the commission.

In November 2019, she signed an open letter supporting the Union des progressistes juifs de Belgique for being critical of Israel and declared that she supported the cancellation of an economic mission of the Wallonian and Bruxelloise regions to Israel.

In September 2020, she spoke at a rally in Brussels in favour of abortion rights.

During the COVID-19 pandemic in Belgium, she expressed difficulties over the commission's handling of online meetings, as she suffered from a visual disability.
