= Saskia Bricmont =

Belgian politician (born 1985)

Saskia Bricmont MEP
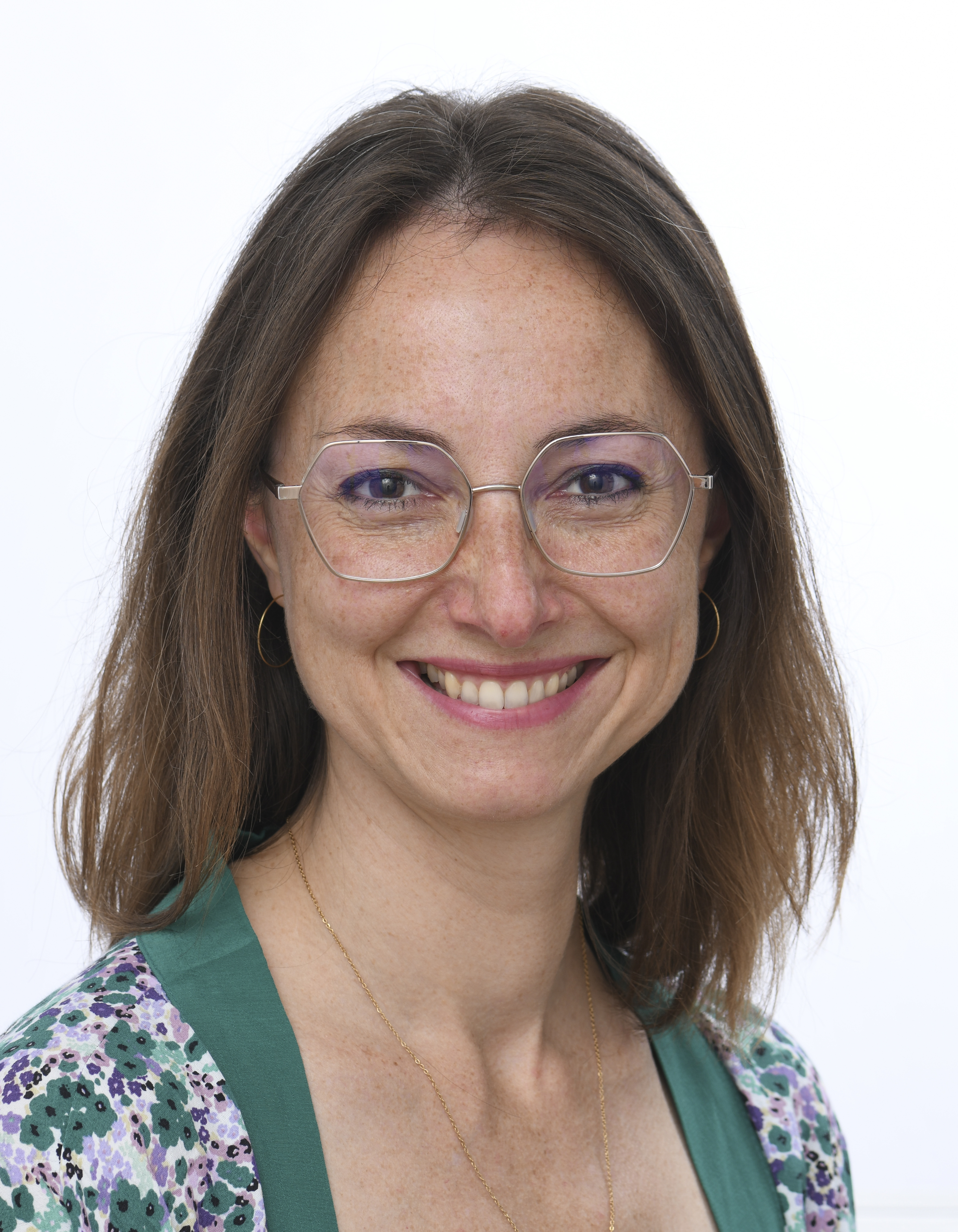

Member of the European Parliament for the French-speaking electoral college of Belgium
- Incumbent
- Assumed office 2 July 2019

Personal details
- Born: 16 March 1985 (age 41) Tournai, Belgium
- Party: Ecolo

Saskia Bricmont (French pronunciation: [saskja bʁikmɔ̃]; born 16 March 1985) is a Belgian politician who was elected as a Member of the European Parliament in 2019.

== Political career ==
In parliament, Bricmont serves on the Committee on Civil Liberties, Justice and Home Affairs (since 2019) and the Committee on International Trade (since 2020). In 2022, she joined the Committee of Inquiry to investigate the use of Pegasus and equivalent surveillance spyware.

In addition to her committee assignments, Bricmont is part of the Parliament's delegation for relations with the Maghreb countries and the Arab Maghreb Union. She is also a member of the European Parliament Intergroup on Children’s Rights, the European Parliament Intergroup on LGBT Rights, the European Parliament Intergroup on the Welfare and Conservation of Animals and the Responsible Business Conduct Working Group.
