= Workers' Party of Belgium =

Workers' Party of Belgium Partij van de Arbeid van België Parti du travail de Belgique Partei der Arbeit Belgiens
- Abbreviation: PTB; PVDA
- President: Raoul Hedebouw
- General Secretary: Peter Mertens
- Vice President: David Pestieau
- Founder: Ludo Martens
- Founded: 1979; 47 years ago
- Preceded by: All Power To The Workers
- Headquarters: Boulevard Maurice Lemonnier / Maurice Lemonnierlaan 171; 1000, Brussels
- Newspaper: Solidaire / Solidair
- Student wing: Comac
- Youth wing: RedFox
- Women's wing: Zelle
- Membership (2024): ▲28,000–32,000
- Ideology: Marxism; Socialism
- Political position: Left-wing to far-left
- European affiliation: Party of the European Left
- European Parliament group: The Left in the European Parliament
- International affiliation: IMCWP
- Colours: Red; Dark red (customary)
- Chamber of Representatives: 15 / 150
- Senate: 6 / 60
- Flemish Parliament: 9 / 124
- Walloon Parliament: 8 / 75
- Brussels Parliament: 15 / 89
- Parliament of the French Community: 12 / 94
- European Parliament: 2 / 22
- Benelux Parliament: 2 / 21

Website
- www.ptb.be; www.pvda.be; international.ptb-pvda.be

The Workers' Party of Belgium (Note: French: Parti du travail de Belgique, pronounced [paʁti dy tʁavaj də bɛlʒik] (PTB); Dutch: Partij van de Arbeid van België; pronounced [pɑrˈtɛi vɑn də ˈʔɑrbɛit vɑm ˈbɛlɣijə] (PVDA); lit. 'Party of the Labour of Belgium') (PTB-PVDA) is a Marxist and socialist political party in Belgium. It is the only national Belgian party represented in parliament, representing all three regions: Flanders, Wallonia, and Brussels. Having historically been a small party, the PTB-PVDA has gained momentum since the 2010s, continuously scoring better at the elections, particularly in Wallonia and working-class communities in Brussels.

It has two Members of the European Parliament, Marc Botenga and Rudi Kennes, and sits in The Left group alongside other socialist parties. The party is on the left-wing to far-left of the political spectrum.

== History ==
=== 1968–1978: Background in the radical student movement ===
The Workers' Party of Belgium originated in the student movements surrounding the Catholic University of Leuven in the 1960s. A group of students turned towards the working-class movement and organised the student union Studenten VakBeweging (SVB). They considered the politics of the existing Communist Party of Belgium to be revisionist, i.e. too much turned toward social-democratic politics. They were influenced by the ideas of the Chinese Communist Party, guerrilla movements in Latin America, the movement against the Vietnam War, and the Leuven-Vlaams movement, all perceived as aspects of a worldwide struggle against colonial or neocolonial oppression and for civil or workers' rights.

Their support and participation in an important strike in the coalmines turned the movement into a political party. In 1970 the SVB founded the periodical AMADA (Alle Macht Aan De Arbeiders – All Power To The Workers), which became the first name of their party. Four years later the TPO, a French-speaking counterpart to the Dutch-language AMADA was created. Following their role model, the People's Republic of China, AMADA-TPO held strong anti-Soviet positions.

=== 1979–2003: Maoist party on the margins ===
In November 1979 the first party congress was held, which adopted a Marxist-Leninist-Maoist programme and officially established the Party of Labor of Belgium, PVDA-PTB. Ludo Martens became the first president, and remained an important ideologist of the party until his death in 2011.

By the turn of the century Ludo Martens, who by then worked as an advisor for Laurent-Désiré Kabila in the Democratic Republic of Congo, was replaced as effective leader by the party's General Secretary Nadine Rosa-Rosso. While not much had changed about party leadership since it was founded, local campaigns started to see some successes: In 2000 the PTB-PVDA won their first four seats in local councils, in the municipalities of Zelzate (12.8%; 2 seats) and Herstal (7.8%; 2 seats).

In 2024 Bert de Belder, a party member responsible for international relations, said of the period: "We tried to connect with the working class in our early stages but remained for a long time a small cadre party with a core of very dedicated militants, but with relatively little impact on the society at large, the working class, and class struggle."

=== 2004–2011: Party renewal ===
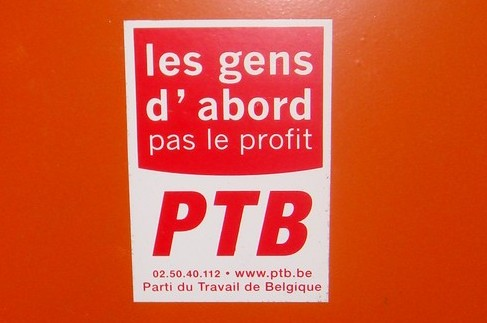
Campaign poster in Brussels in 2008

Following its electoral defeat in 2003 and 2007, the PVDA-PTB fundamentally changed its working methods and communication. Both the General Secretary and president were replaced in the following congress as a new generation took over. On 2 March 2008, the eighth congress closed. It would later be referred to as the "Renewal Congress".

This period in the party's development found them rework their communication strategy, pivoting from revolutionary slogans to everyday issues and concerns such as cost of living, mobility, etc. The PTB-PVDA dropped all mentions of Mao or Stalin, went from Marxist-Leninist to Marxist and reduced its comments on international politics. The direction taken by the party since its crisis in 2008 has been described as populist-socialist.

=== 2012–present: Rise in popularity ===
In the 2019 federal election the PTB-PVDA doubled its vote share. Marc Botenga, who was elected the first Member of the European Parliament coming from a Marxist party in Belgium's history that year, described the growth in the party as "from a few thousand members to over 15,000 now in the space of 10-15 years". The explosive growth slowed down after 2020, with the party reaching a membership of around 25,000 in 2024.

Using the financial means at the party's disposal through public funding it has built numerous organisations. Among them are a network of medical centers (Medics for the People) providing free healthcare, a law firm (Progressive Lawyers Network), multiple youth and women's organisations and foreign aid organisations.

The 10th party congress in 2021 saw Raoul Hedebouw, "the [party's] most popular personality", be elected to president and the position of General Secretary reinstated and given to Peter Mertens. The 2024 federal election saw the party rise to become the fourth strongest contender. That same year they elected a second member into the European Parliament and consolidated its popularity in the local elections.

== International relations ==
The PTB-PVDA used to host the International Communist Seminar until 2014 which had become one of the main worldwide gatherings of communist parties.

== Ideology and positions ==
The party is variously described as socialist and/or Marxist, with sources also variously describing it as left-wing or far-left. It is the furthest left party represented in the Belgian Federal Parliament.

The party advocates for strengthening workers' rights, increasing pensions, and decreasing the retirement age to 65, and supports expanding social programs and the welfare state. It supports increasing taxes on the wealthy and corporations. It is opposed to austerity and neoliberalism.

A central part of the party's program is the "social climate revolution", which seeks to combat both climate change and social inequality.

Although the party is in favor of greater ecological policies, the party has been in opposition to restrictions on individual car use, including opposing low emissions zones in Antwerp city center, paid parking in Schaerbeek, and increased fines for illegal parking in Liège. Despite this, the party also advocates for expanding public transit and making public transit free.

Elected representatives and full-time staff observe a pay cap indexed to the wages of a "skilled worker", and the excess is donated to the party.

They strongly advocate for free healthcare for everyone in Belgium and support trade unions.

=== Eurocriticism ===
The PTB-PVDA defines their eurocritical positions as an attempt to "break the logic of neoliberalism, austerity and competition", describing the four freedoms as serving capital and not people. In a 2026 interview general secretary Peter Mertens stresses the importance of an "autonomous European Union" that is disconnected from the USA.

=== Foreign policy ===
According to political scientist Steven Van Hecke, in terms of foreign policy, parties such as the PVDA have both a pacifist and a socioeconomic agenda.

The party abstained from the vote condemning the 2022 Russian invasion of Ukraine in the Chamber of Representatives. According to PTB MP Nabil Boukili, "the diplomatic way is the only possible way to avoid a war". Party spokesman Raoul Hedebouw said he condemns the invasion of Ukraine but does not think NATO should be part of the solution.

The PTB/PDVA holds anti-zionist positions and advocates boycotting Israel for the ongoing Gaza genocide. Since 2023 the party has combined its efforts with trade unions to push for an arms embargo.

=== Historical ===
Historically, the party supported Marxism–Leninism and Maoism, although the party dropped references to Lenin and Mao, as well as references to other communist party governments, in the late 2000s and early 2010s. Political scientist Pascal Delwit claimed in 2014 that the PVDA still maintains a Marxist-Leninist line internally, but not to the outside world.

=== Electoral positioning ===
During the 2019 election campaign, the RePresent research centre — composed of political scientists from five universities (UAntwerpen, KU Leuven, VUB, UCLouvain and ULB) — studied the electoral programmes of Belgium's thirteen main political parties. This study classified the parties on two "left-right" axes, from "-5" (extreme left) to "5" (extreme right): a "classic" socio-economic axis, which refers to state intervention in the economic process and the degree to which the state should ensure social equality, and a socio-cultural axis, which refers to a divide articulated around an identity-based opposition on themes such as immigration, Europe, crime, the environment, emancipation, etc.

The PTB then presented the most left-wing programme, along with the PS, on the socio-economic level (-4.43), and also left-wing on the socio-cultural level (-3.73).

The RePresent centre repeated the exercise during the 2024 election campaign for the twelve main parties. The PTB maintained its positioning as the most left-wing Belgian political party on the socio-economic axis (-4.29), and remained on the left — but less so than in 2019 — on the socio-cultural axis (-2.88).

== Membership ==
After the 2008 Renewal Congress the party changed its structure from a cadre party to a three-tiered membership structure. The lowest tier are consultative members, who have membership cards, but don't participate in basic party groups. The second tier are organised members who participate in monthly meetings in basic party groups. The highest tier are the so-called party militants. In 2023 the number given of members was 26,000. In late 2024 consultative members alone were stated to be at around 28,000, with around 3,000 organized members and 1,000 militants.

== Organisations ==
Its monthly publication "Solidaire / Solidair" has between 3,000 and 5,000 subscribers. The PVDA-PTB organized multiple mass organisations that balance autonomy, for example not adhering to the democratic centralism of the party proper, with an adherence to the Workers' Party. Mass organisations of the PVDA-PTB include Zelle, a women's liberation organisation, COMAC, the party's student movement, RedFox and Young Pioneers.

The newspaper Solidarity, and Medicine for the People organize "ManiFiesta", a yearly festival of solidarity between the communities and the left in Belgium. The first edition was held in Bredene (by the sea) on 25 September 2010 and brought together 6,000 people from both North and South of Belgium. The fourth edition in 2013 attracted 10,000 people.

=== Medics for the People ===
Medics for the People (French: Médecine pour le Peuple, Dutch: Geneeskunde voor het Volk, abbreviated as MPLP) is a network of primary health care centers that provide free access to health care with a focus on social and structural dimensions. As of 2026, the organisation consists of 11 medical centers with a staff of 220 and hundreds of volunteers. Founded by party members to care for striking workers' families, MPLP is formally autonomous, having its own elected leadership and budget, but still maintains a strong connection to the Worker's Party through "a shared set of principles and a lot of overlapping people".

== Election results ==
The general elections of 2007 saw the party obtaining 0.88% in the Flemish electoral district and 0.81% in Wallonia.

In the regional elections in 2009, the PVDA-PTB gained 1.04% of the vote in Flanders (+0.48%) and 1.24% of the vote in Wallonia (+0.62%). For the European elections on the same day, the results were: 0.98% in the Dutch-speaking electoral college (+0.37%) and 1.16% in the French-speaking electoral college (+0.35%).

In the general elections of June 2010, the party saw further growth. In Flanders it now represents 1.3% (+0.4%) of the votes for the Chamber of Representatives and 1.4% (+0.5%) for the Senate. Especially in the cities progress was noted with high scores in Antwerp (4.1%) and Liège (4.2%). The highest scores were gained in the cantons of Herstal (9.8%), Assenede (7.5%) and Seraing (7.3%); all places where the PVDA-PTB traditionally is strong.

The municipal and provincial elections in 2012 were considered a breakthrough on a local level for the PVDA-PTB. The party won 52 seats in total; 31 in municipal councils, 4 in provincial councils, and 17 in the district councils.

The federal and regional elections in 2014 saw further success for the party. They elected two deputies to the Chamber of Representatives, two others to the Walloon Parliament, and finally four to the Brussels Parliament.

Previous logo of the Workers' Party, showing the party's previous slogan which translates to "People Before Profit".

An opinion poll released in July 2017 suggested the party was the most popular party in Wallonia at the time, with 25% of respondents indicating they intended to vote for the party. The second-most popular party was the Mouvement Réformateur, part of the governing coalition, with 23%. The poll indicated that the Workers' Party would win 26 seats in the Belgian Chamber of Representatives if the next federal election were held immediately, putting it in tied first place with the Flemish N-VA.

The party generally increased its vote share in the 2018 local elections, and won over 15% of the vote in several French-speaking cities.

In the 2019 Belgian federal election, the party scored well and gained 10 seats. The party did well in Wallonia (13.8% overall there), scoring over 16% in Liège Province, over 15% in Hainaut Province, and also over 12% in Brussels-Capital Region. It achieved at least 22% of the votes in both Charleroi and La Louvière cities. Its strongest showing in Flanders was 12.71% in Antwerp city, while in Wallonia, its strongest showing was in Herstal with 27.55% of the votes. The PTB was also the fourth largest party in the European election the same day in the Francophone areas, winning 14.59% and giving it one seat.

=== Chamber of Representatives ===
Election	Votes	%	Seats	+/-	Government
1991	30,491	0.5	0 / 212		Extra-parliamentary
1995	34,247	0.6	0 / 150	0	Extra-parliamentary
1999	30,930	0.5	0 / 150	0	Extra-parliamentary
2003	20,825	0.2	0 / 150	0	Extra-parliamentary
2007	56,167	0.8	0 / 150	0	Extra-parliamentary
2010	101,088	1.6	0 / 150	0	Extra-parliamentary
2014	251,289	3.7	2 / 150	▲2	Opposition
2019	584,458	8.6	12 / 150	▲10	Opposition
2024	688,369	9.9	15 / 150	▲3	Opposition

=== Senate ===
Election	Votes	%	Seats	+/-
2003	18,699	0.1	0 / 40	
2007	54,807	0.8	0 / 40	0
2010	105,060	1.6	0 / 40	0
2014	0 / 40	0		
2019	5 / 40	▲5		
2024	6 / 40	▲1		

=== Regional ===
==== Brussels Parliament ====
Election	F.E.C.		D.E.C.		Seats			+/-	Government
Election	Votes	%	Votes	%	Total	F.E.C.	D.E.C.	+/-	Government
2004	2,221	0.6			0 / 89				Extraparliamentary
2009	4,038	0.9			0 / 89			0	Extraparliamentary
2014	15,782	3.9			4 / 89			▲4	Opposition
2019	52,297	13.47	2,992	4.27	11 / 89	10 / 72	1 / 17	▲7	Opposition
2024	81,542	20.92	5,619	6.99	16 / 89	15 / 72	1 / 17	▲5	Opposition

==== Flemish Parliament ====
Election	Votes	%	Seats	+/-	Government
2004	22,874	0.6	0 / 124		Extraparliamentary
2009	42,849	1.0	0 / 124	0	Extraparliamentary
2014	106,114	2.5	0 / 124	0	Extraparliamentary
2019	225,593	5.3	4 / 124	▲4	Opposition
2024	364,070	8.3	9 / 124	▲5	Opposition

==== Walloon Parliament ====
Election	Votes	%	Seats	+/-	Government
2004	12,216	0.6	0 / 75		Extraparliamentary
2009	24,875	1.2	0 / 75	0	Extraparliamentary
2014	117,500	5.7	2 / 75	▲2	Opposition
2019	278,343	13.7	10 / 75	▲8	Opposition
2024	250,146	12.1	8 / 75	▼2	Opposition

=== European Parliament ===
Election	List leader	Votes	%	Seats	+/-	EP Group
1984	Unclear	43,637	0.76	0 / 24	New	-
1989	Unclear	29,778	0.50	0 / 24	0	-
1994	Unclear	59,270	0.99	0 / 25	0	-
1999 (Note: Only PVDA took part in the election.)	Unclear	22,038	0.36	0 / 25	0	-
2004	David Pestieau (F.E.C.); Kris Merckx (D.E.C.)	44,452	0.68	0 / 24	0	-
2009	Raoul Hedebouw (F.E.C.); Peter Mertens (D.E.C.)	68,540	1.04	0 / 22	0	-
2014	Aurélie Decoene (F.E.C.); Tim Joye (D.E.C.)	234,718	3.51	0 / 22	0	-
2019	Marc Botenga (F.E.C.); Line De Witte (D.E.C.)	566,274	8.41	1 / 21	▲1	GUE/NGL
2024	Marc Botenga (F.E.C.); Rudi Kennes (D.E.C.)	763,340	10.70	2 / 22	▲1	The Left

== Elected politicians ==
European deputies

- 2024 – present:
1. Marc Botenga
2. Rudi Kennes

Federal deputies

- 2019 – 2024:
1. Nabil Boukili
2. Gaby Colebunders
3. Roberto d'Amico
4. Greet Daems
5. Steven De Vuyst
6. Raoul Hedebouw
7. Sofie Merckx
8. Peter Mertens
9. Nadia Moscufo
10. Marco Van Hees
11. Maria Vindevoghel
12. Thierry Warmoes

Regional deputies

- 2019 – 2024:
- Brussels
1. Jan Busselen
2. Francis Dagrin
3. Caroline De Bock
4. Françoise De Smedt
5. Elisa Groppi
6. Youssef Handichi
7. Jean-Pierre Kerckhofs
8. Stéphanie Koplowicz
9. Leila Lahssaini
10. Petya Obolensky
11. Luc Vancauwenberghe
- Flanders
1. Jos D'Haese
2. Onno Vandewalle
3. Kim De Witte
4. Lise Vandecasteele
- Wallonia
1. Alice Bernard
2. John Beugnies
3. Jori Dupont
4. Antoine Hermant
5. Laure Lekane
6. Julien Liradelfo
7. Germain Mugemangango
8. Samuel Nemes
9. Amandine Pavet
10. Anouk Vandevoorde

Provincial councilors

- 2018 – 2024:
1. (Liège Province) Catharina Craen
2. (Hainaut Province) Giovanni Dell'Area
3. (Liège Province) Marc Delrez
4. (Liège Province) Catherine Lacomble
5. (Liège Province) Luc Navet
6. (Liège Province) Rafik Rassâa
7. (Liège Province) Marie-Christine Scheen
8. (Antwerp Province) Rudy Sohier
9. (Hainaut Province) Luc Vandenameele
10. (Namur Province) Patricia Van Muylder
