= Raoul Hedebouw =

Belgian politician

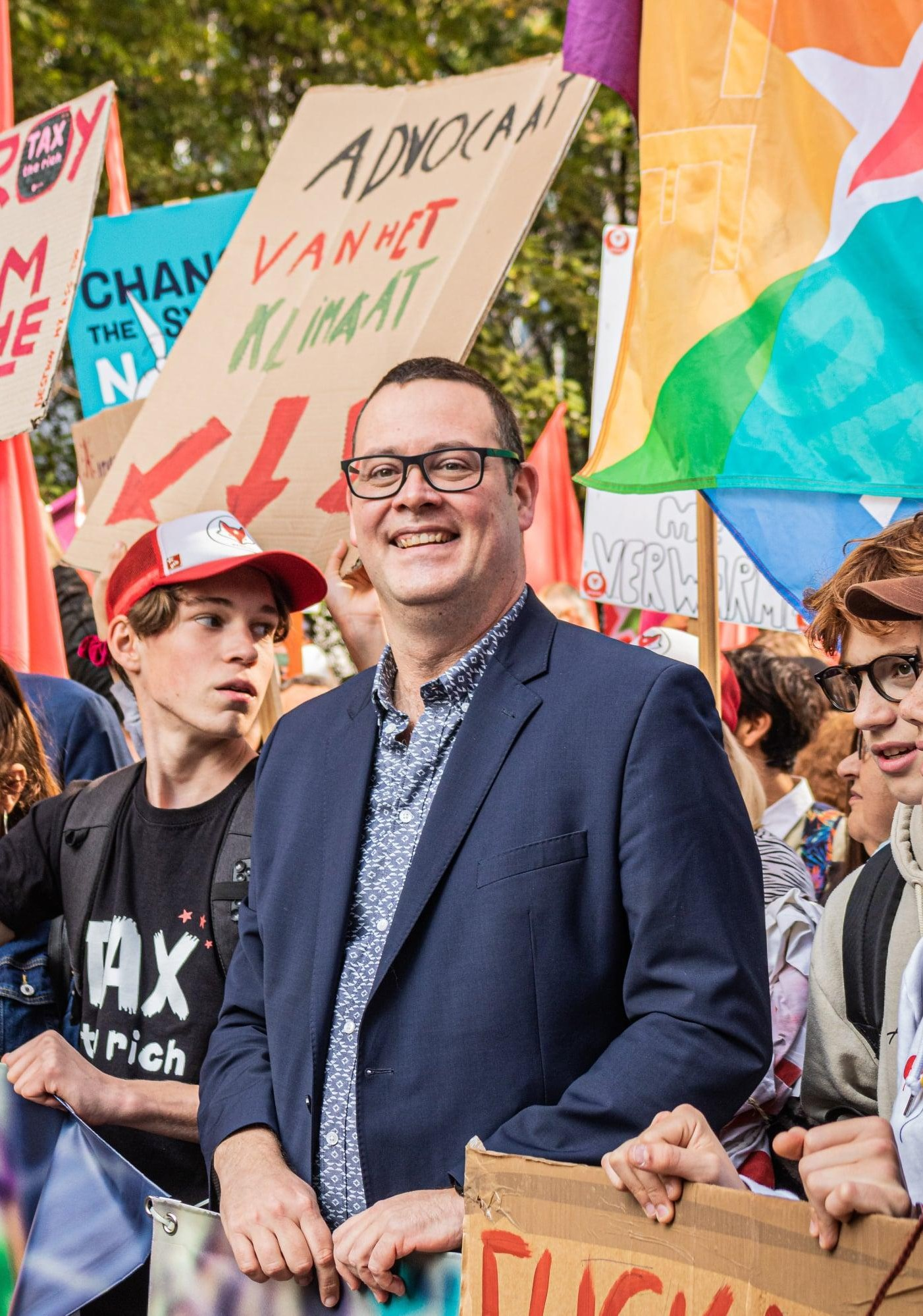
- Hedebouw at a climate action, Brussels, 2021

President of the Workers' Party of Belgium
- Incumbent
- Assumed office 5 December 2021
- Preceded by: Peter Mertens

Member of the Chamber of Representatives (Belgium)
- Incumbent
- Assumed office 25 May 2014

Member of the City Council of Liège
- Incumbent
- Assumed office 14 October 2012

National spokesperson of Workers' Party of Belgium
- In office 2008–2021

Personal details
- Born: Raoul Hedebouw; 12 July 1977 (age 49) Herstal, Belgium
- Party: Workers' Party of Belgium
- Occupation: Biologist; Politician

Raoul Hedebouw (born 12 July 1977) is a Belgian politician who has been serving as the president of the Workers' Party of Belgium (PVDA-PTB) since 2021. He previously served as the national spokesperson of the party until 2021, as well as parliamentary leader in the Belgian Chamber of Representatives. He furthermore serves as member of the Liège City Council.

== Youth ==
Raoul Hedebouw was born in Herstal, Liège on July 12, 1977, in a Dutch-speaking Flemish family; he was raised bilingually, both in Dutch and in French. Hedebouw grew up in a working-class neighbourhood, with his mother working in a factory producing medical equipment and his father as a steelworker in ArcelorMittal. In 1992, his mother was fired, which impacted Hedebouw's views: "What happened to my mother, has been a decisive factor in my engagement." (Note: Translated from Dutch:"Wat er met mijn moeder is gebeurd, is bepalend geweest voor mijn engagement")

Hedebouw went to study biology and botany at the University of Liège.

== Political career ==
Hedebouw joined the Marxist PVDA-PTB and became its spokesperson in 2008. He was first elected as council member in Liège after the local elections of 2012. After the federal elections of 2014 he became one of the first two federal MPs for the PVDA-PTB. Hedebouw often gives his speeches in the Chamber in both Dutch and French, changing from one language to the other between sentences.

== Political views ==
Hedebouw is a communist. He has advocated for sanctions against Israel.

== Knife attack ==
When preparing for a speech for the International Workers' Day on May 1, 2017, Hedebouw was attacked and stabbed in the leg. The damage was limited and Hedebouw was able to finish his speech before being taken to hospital, sustaining only a mild injury to his thigh.

== Bibliography ==
- Première à gauche. Entretien avec Gilles Martin (Left first, an interview with Gilles Martin, Editions Aden, 2013) ISBN 9782805920561

== See also ==
- Peter Mertens
