= Peter Mertens =

Belgian politician (born 1969)

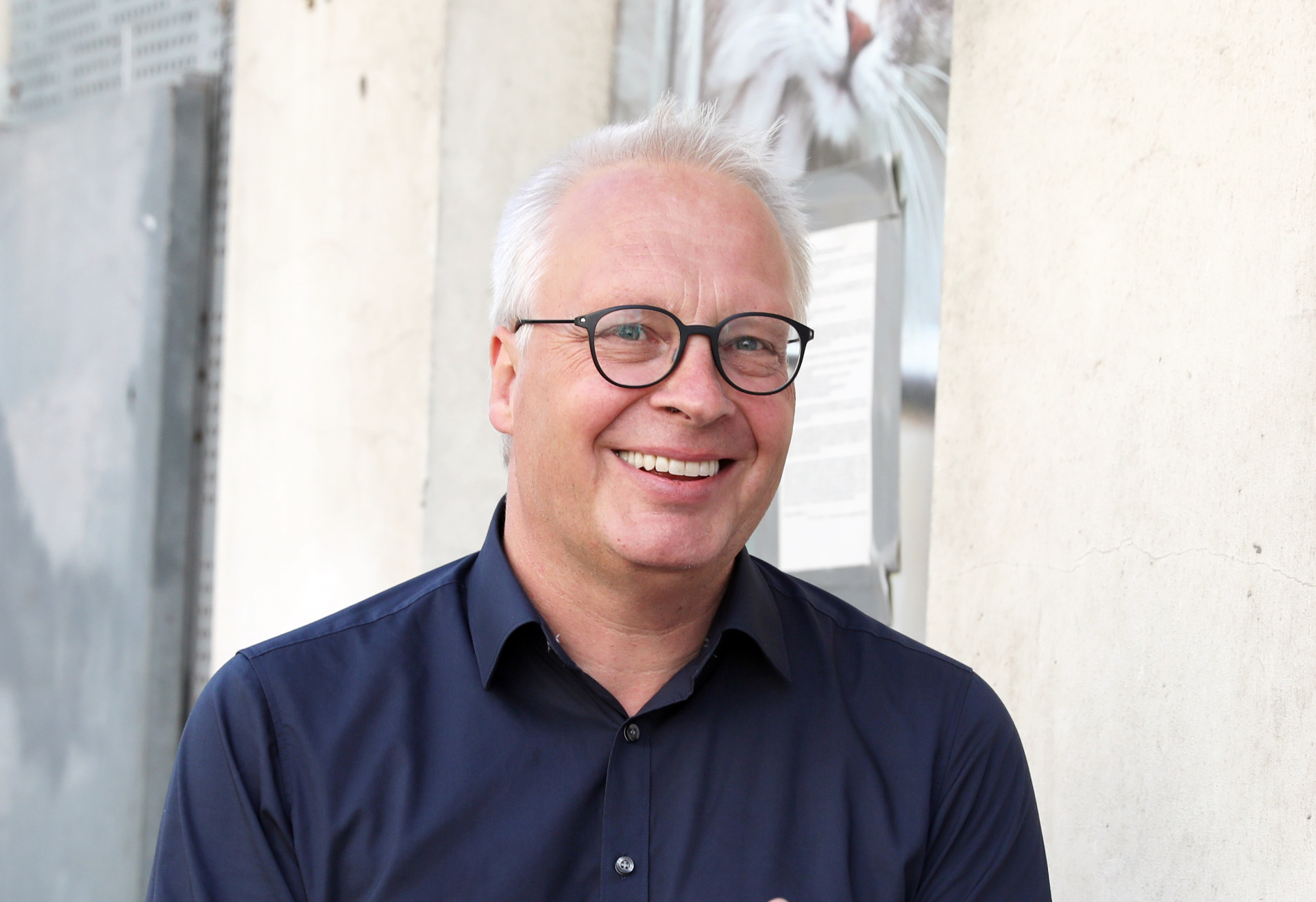
- Mertens in 2020

President of the Workers' Party of Belgium
- In office 2 March 2008 – 5 December 2021
- Preceded by: Ludo Martens
- Succeeded by: Raoul Hedebouw

Member of the Antwerp municipal council
- Incumbent
- Assumed office 2013

Member of the Chamber of Representatives
- Incumbent
- Assumed office 20 June 2019
- Constituency: Antwerp

Personal details
- Born: 17 December 1969 (age 56) Wilrijk, Antwerp, Belgium
- Party: Workers' Party of Belgium
- Education: UFSIA; Ghent University
- Occupation: Author; politician

Peter Mertens (born 17 December 1969) is a Belgian politician who led the Workers' Party of Belgium (PTB-PVDA) from 2008 to 2021. He has served as a member of the Chamber of Representatives since 2019, and as a municipal councilor in Antwerp since 2013. Since 2022, he is the general secretary of the PTB-PVDA.

== Youth ==
Mertens was born in Antwerp. In 1987, when he was 18 years old, he founded the Studenten tegen Racisme (Students against Racism, SteR) with fellow UFSIA student Marc Spruyt. Four years later, when he was studying sociology at Ghent University, he led a student protest movement against the Gulf War. At this time he joined the youth organisation of the Workers' Party of Belgium, the Marxistisch-Leninistische Beweging (Marxist–Leninist Movement, MLB). With this organisation he was also present at a wide range of student activities, like the solidarity campaign with the workers of the shipyard Boelwerf in Temse, which was threatened with closure. In 1994 Mertens became the president of the MLB, which then participated in the strike movement against proposed reforms by the Minister of Higher Education in the government of the French community, Michel Lebrun. Mertens obtained his licentiate in sociology in 1998 and started working as a temporary employee (interim work). For a year and a half he worked as a labourer for industrial cleaning firms and subcontractors in the Port of Ghent.

== Politician ==
In 1995 the 5th party congress of the PVDA-PTB took place and Peter Mertens was elected to the National Council of the party. He left his position as president at the youth movement in 1998 and became political secretary in the party branch of the province of Antwerp. In 2002, at the 7th party congress, Mertens was elected to the party bureau. Another four years later, he became responsible for the daily management of the party. In 2007, the Workers' Party of Belgium started its Renewal Congress, which gathered 460 delegates. At the closing session on 2 March 2008, Mertens was elected as the successor of then party chairman Ludo Martens, who was having serious health problems.

Almost immediately, Mertens began to expand the party's reach to a wider audience. Mertens declared in the Dutch language newspaper De Morgen that his party would leave behind its pedantic attitude and the big theories. As chairman, he announced his intention to rethink the position of the party in accordance with the decisions taken at the congress, in the process turning his back on Maoism and Stalinism. To present the new vision and direction of the party he wrote the book Op Mensenmaat (On a human scale). Its successor, Hoe durven ze? (How dare they?), appeared in December 2011 and became an instant hit. After half a year 17,000 copies were sold and in 2012 Mertens received the Jaap Kruithof Prize for this work. At the local elections of 2012 he was on top of the list for the municipal election in the city of Antwerp and was elected with 8.976 preference votes. This made him the fourth most popular politician in Antwerp, behind Bart De Wever, Patrick Janssens and Filip Dewinter.

In 2014, Mertens led the Antwerp list for the Belgian Chamber of Representatives. With 26,010 preferential votes and a result of 4.5 percent in the constituency of Antwerp, he narrowly failed to reach the electoral threshold. At the same elections, however, the Workers' Party of Belgium for the first time had members elected to the Belgian Federal Parliament: Raoul Hedebouw and Marco Van Hees. In 2016, Mertens distanced himself from his predecessor Ludo Martens, who used to praise Joseph Stalin. In the 2018 municipal elections, Mertens was re-elected as a municipal councillor with 11,842 preferential votes. In the 2019 federal elections, Mertens was the lead candidate on the Workers' Party of Belgium list for the constituency of Antwerp and won a seat in Belgian Chamber of Representatives. He received 46,802 preferential votes, ranking him 12th nationally for the Chamber. He became the first Dutch-speaking Marxist in the Federal Parliament since 1981.

== Bibliography ==
- De Belgische vakverenigingen tijdens en na de Tweede Wereldoorlog (The Belgian workers' unions during and after World War 2, Gent, 1993)
- Het fascisme gisteren en vandaag (Fascism yesterday and today, EPO, 2000) Herwig Lerouge, Peter Mertens e.a. ISBN 9064452024
- De arbeidersklasse in het tijdperk van de transnationale ondernemingen (The proletariat in the age of transnational corporations, Imast, 2006)
- Op Mensenmaat (Stof voor een socialisme zonder blauwe plekken), (On a human scale, EPO, 2009) ISBN 9789064455070
- Hoe durven ze? (De euro, de crisis en de grote hold-up) (How dare they?, EPO, 2011) ISBN 9789491297137
- Graailand (Het leven boven onze stand) (Grabland, EPO, 2016) ISBN 9789462670884
- Ze zijn ons vergeten · De werkende klasse, de zorg en de crisis die komt (EPO, 2020) ISBN 9789462672550 (translated to English as They Forgot Us)
- Mutiny: How Our World is Tilting (Leftword, 2024) ISBN 9789392018633
