= Marc Botenga =

Belgian politician (born 1980)

Marc Botenga MEP
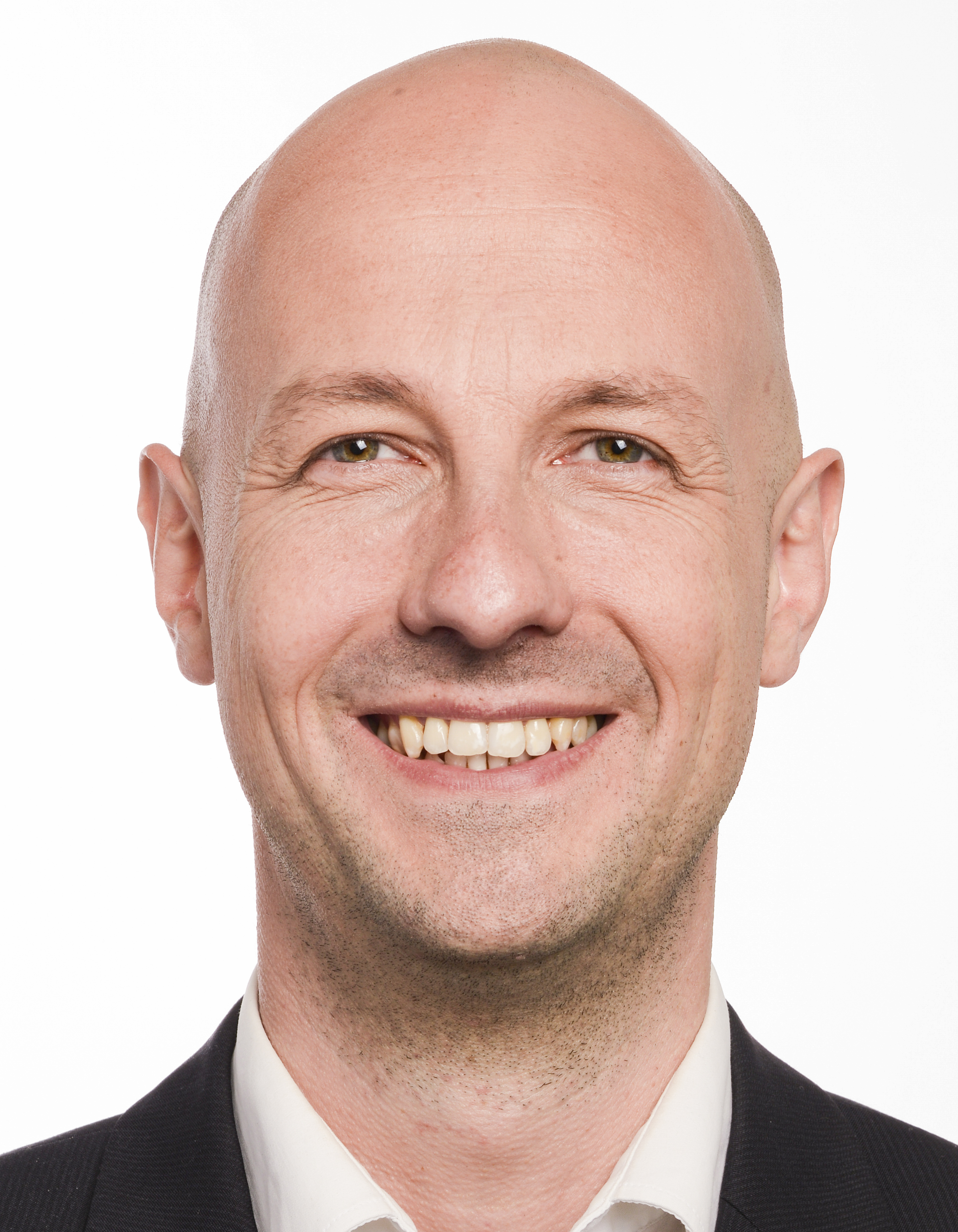
- Official portrait, 2019

Member of the European Parliament for Belgium
- Incumbent
- Assumed office 2 July 2019
- Constituency: French-speaking electoral college

Personal details
- Born: 29 December 1980 (age 45) Brussels, Belgium
- Party: Belgium: Workers' Party (European Union) EU: GUE/NGL
- Education: IMT Lucca
- Occupation: Politician

Marc Botenga (born 29 December 1980) is a Belgian politician of the Workers' Party of Belgium (PVDA-PTB). In 2019, he was elected as member of the Ninth European Parliament as part of The Left in the European Parliament party group. Botenga is the first MEP to be elected for the PVDA-PTB.

== Biography ==
Botenga studied law at the Université libre de Bruxelles. In 1998 he engaged in a movement advocating for the resignation of then Belgian Minister of the Interior Louis Tobback, following the killing of asylum seeker Semira Adamu by police officers. Later, he participated in workers' mobilization against the close-down of the Forges de Clabecq iron works.

In the wake of the European debt crisis beginning in 2010, Botenga began to become more involved in European politics, participating in actions of political support for Greece. In 2016, he became the political advisor of the European GUE/NGL parliamentary group. He is a member of the Committee on Industry, Research and Energy and the delegation to the ACP-EU Joint Parliamentary Assembly.

== Member of the European Parliament ==
Botenga is a Member of the European Parliament since the 2019 elections with The Left group. He is member on the Committee on Industry, Research and Energy and the Delegation to the ACP-EU Joint Parliamentary Assembly.

== See also ==
- Workers' Party of Belgium
- European United Left–Nordic Green Left
