= Eupen-Malmedy =

Former German region in eastern Belgium

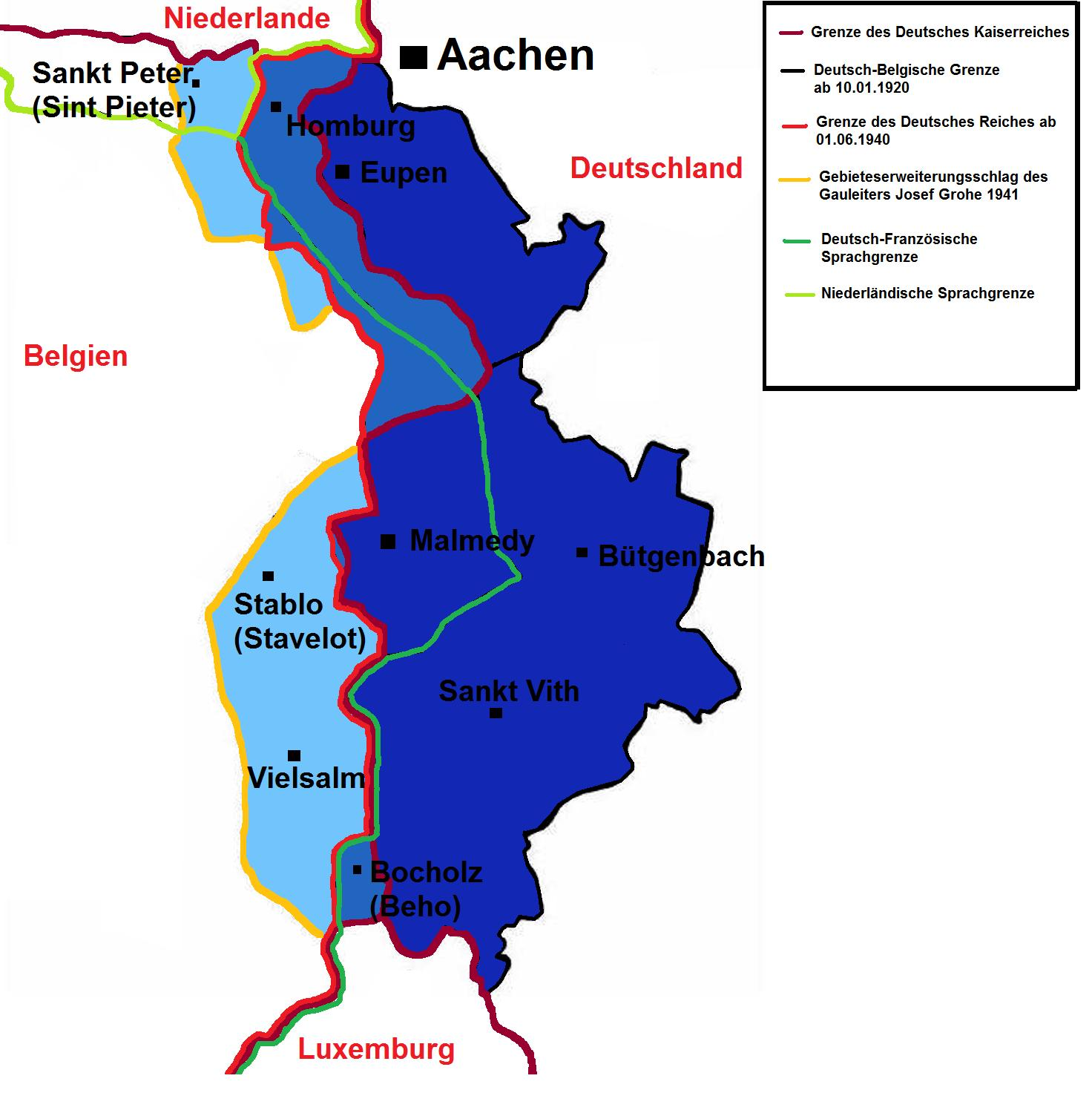
Eupen-Malmedy border changes between 1920 and 1945

Eupen-Malmedy is a small, predominantly German-speaking region in eastern Belgium. It consists of three administrative cantons around the towns of Eupen, Malmedy, and Sankt Vith which encompass some 730 square kilometres (280 sq mi). Elsewhere in Belgium, the region is commonly referred to as the East Cantons (German: Ostkantone, French: Cantons de l'Est, Dutch: Oostkantons).

Eupen-Malmedy became part of Belgium in the aftermath of World War I. The region, which had formerly been part of Prussia and the German Empire, was allocated to Belgium by the Treaty of Versailles. It was formally annexed after a controversial referendum in 1920, becoming part of Liège Province in 1925. Agitation by German nationalists during the interwar period led to its re-annexation by Nazi Germany during World War II. It was returned to Belgium in 1945. Nine of the eleven municipalities which originally constituted Eupen-Malmedy now form the German-speaking Community of Belgium, one of Belgium's three federal communities. Historically, the territories have little in common and were never considered a single unit until the Treaty of Versailles.

== History ==
=== Background ===
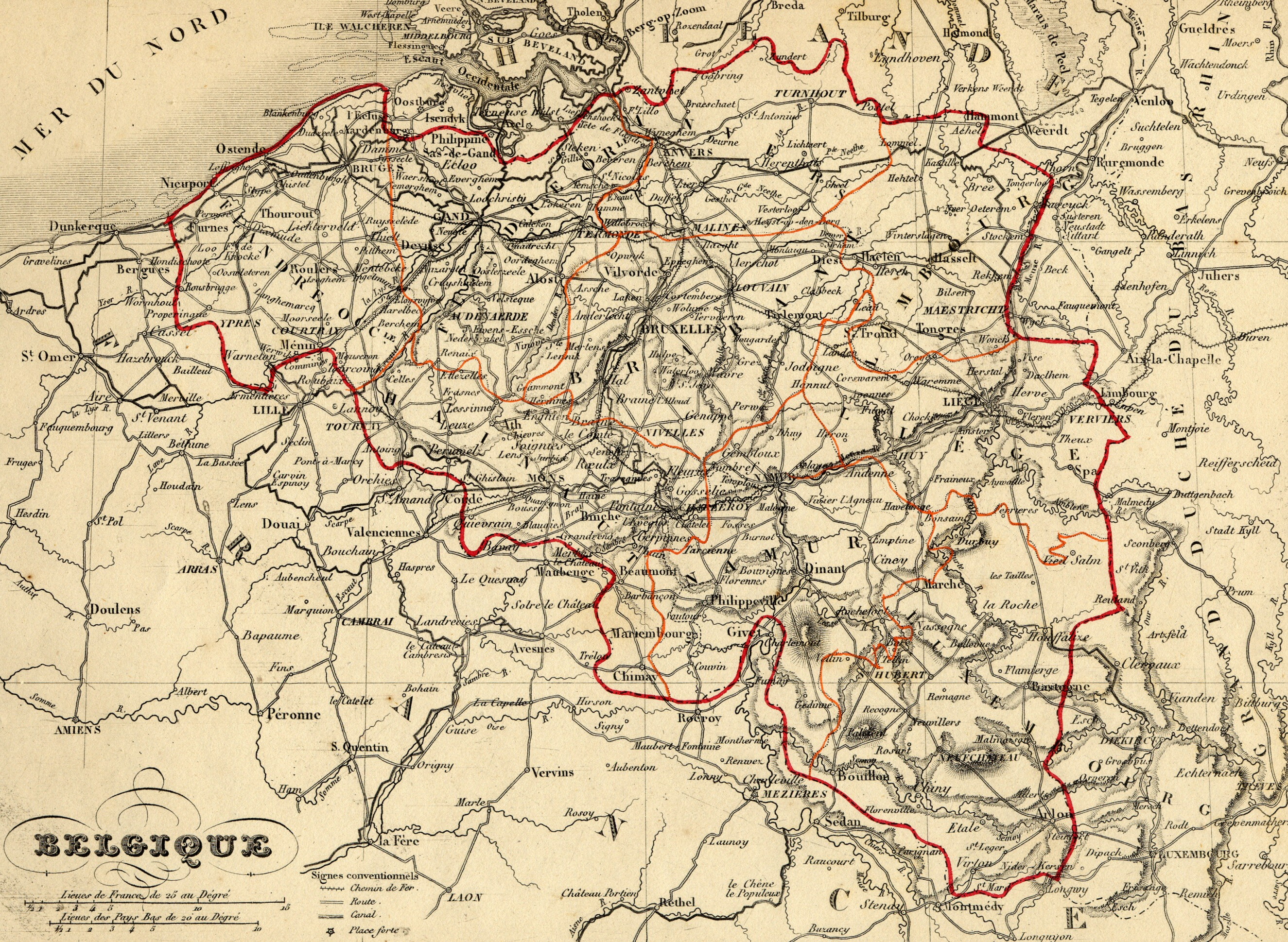
An 1843 map of Belgium, with Eupen and Malmedy shown as part of the Kingdom of Prussia

The history of the area dates back to the 6th century, when Christianity was first introduced to Southern Rhineland. In 651, Frankish monks established the Princely Abbey of Stavelot-Malmedy; Malmedy then became part of the Roman Catholic Diocese of Liège, while Stavelot was attached to the Archdiocese of Cologne. Following the Treaty of Verdun in 843, Stavelot-Malmedy became a part of Middle Francia. Ultimately, the principality of Stavelot-Malmedy was an independent state within the Holy Roman Empire until 1795.

The northern part around Eupen was originally part of the Duchy of Limburg, a dependency of the Duchy of Brabant which was latterly part of the Austrian Netherlands. The southern part, around Sankt Vith, belonged to the Duchy of Luxembourg. The small village of Manderfeld-Schönberg belonged to the Archbishopric of Trier. Malmedy and Waimes, except the village of Faymonville, were part of the abbatial principality of Stavelot-Malmedy which was an Imperial Estate of the Holy Roman Empire. By the 19th century, the majority of the territory spoke German while the city of Malmedy was split between French and German speakers. In this period, Eupen emerged as a minor centre of the industry for treating sheep's wool and enjoyed links to other manufacturing centres in the region of Aachen, Monschau, and Verviers.

In 1795, as the French Revolutionary Army entered the Austrian Netherlands, the area was also taken over and eventually incorporated in its entirety into the French department of the Ourthe.

=== Prussian administration, 1815–1919 ===
At the Congress of Vienna, the whole area was awarded to the Kingdom of Prussia. A small area in the northwest known as Moresnet, coveted by the United Netherlands and Prussia for its rich deposits of zinc ores, became a tiny neutral condominium. After 1830, the Netherlands' position in Moresnet was taken over by newly independent Belgium, and this remained so even after 1839, when Belgium relinquished its claims to neighbouring Dutch Limburg.

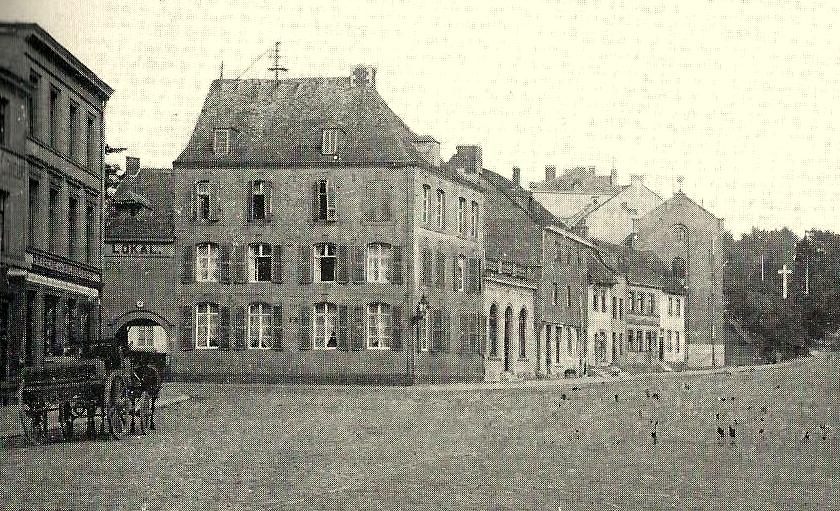
View of Eupen in 1900 when the territory was under German rule

The establishment of Prussian rule in the rest of the region had a limited effect on its inhabitants. Even in the mainly French or Walloon-speaking Malmedy, changes went smoothly since the municipality was allowed to continue to use French for its administration until the Kulturkampf (1872-78) when the authorities forbade the use of French and attacked the privileges of the Catholic Church in Germany.

For instance, during a visit to the city in 1856, King Frederick William IV is believed to have said "I am proud to have in my kingdom a little country where people speak French". For the people of Malmedy, this would eventually change when German was implemented as the only official administrative language. This was no problem in Eupen and Sankt Vith but more so in Malmedy-Waimes. There was some resistance to the interdiction: for instance, Catholic priests who were forbidden to preach in French started to preach in Walloon in order to avoid having to preach in German.

Most of the territory had spoken German or German dialects for centuries, with Walloon being spoken by about two-thirds of the population in the district of Malmedy at the time it was newly created in 1816. The overwhelmingly German-speaking district of Sankt Vith further south was, in 1821, united with the district of Malmedy to form a new, much larger district of Malmedy that then had a majority of German-speakers.

While the local French-speaking and German-speaking populations initially enjoyed good relations with each other, the relations soured after Otto von Bismarck ascended to power in 1862 and German unification which culminated in the establishment of the German Empire in 1871. Bismarck's Kulturkampf greatly alienated the majority Catholic population of Eupen-Malmedy, and the policy soon escalated into exclusion of minority languages and discrimination of minorities. Only the use of the standard German language was permitted, and the Walloon population was prosecuted for speaking French publicly. After French and Walloon languages were excluded from both education and administration, Walloon administrations were expelled in 1879.

According to the 1 December 1900 population census this new district of Malmedy had only a minority of 28.7% Walloon-speaking inhabitants. The smaller but more populous district of Eupen was almost entirely German-speaking, with Walloon and French speaking minorities making up less than 5 percent. During the German occupation of Belgium during World War I, German policy of Flamenpolitik (favouring the Flemish over the Walloons) affected Eupen-Malmedy as well.

=== Provisional Belgian administration, 1919–1925 ===
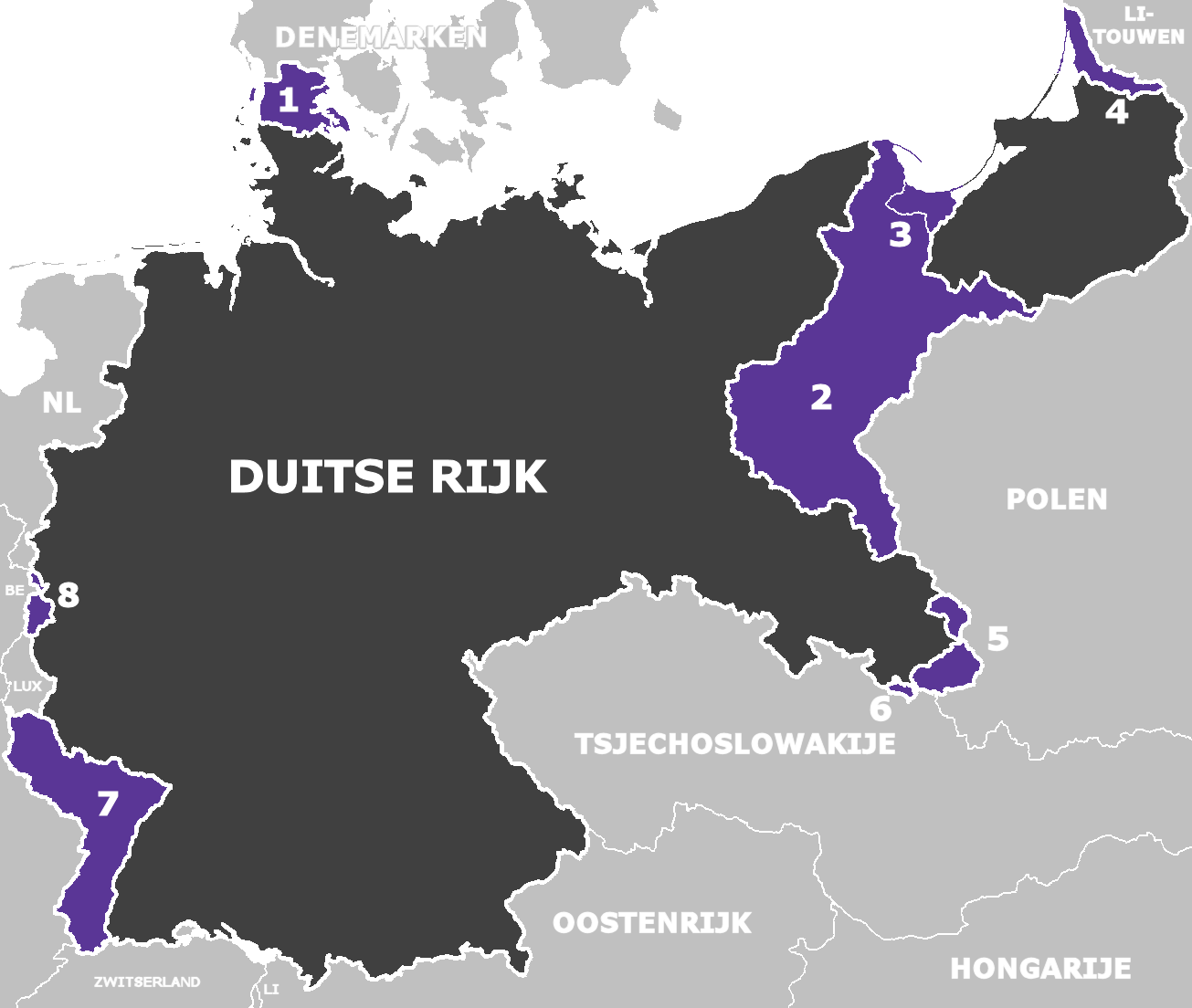
Map showing the territories lost by the German Empire after World War I. Eupen-Malmedy is labelled "8" on the map.

During World War I, Belgium was invaded by the German Empire and between 1914 and 1918 most of Belgium's territory was under German military occupation. With the defeat of Germany in 1918, Belgian politicians attempted to expand Belgian territory at German expense. However, the settlement at the Treaty of Versailles proved disappointing for Belgium. Belgium failed to gain any territory from the Netherlands or Luxembourg, but was awarded the small German colonial territory of Ruanda-Urundi in Africa and Eupen-Malmedy in Europe, together with the previously neutral territory of Moresnet. At the time, Eupen-Malmedy had approximately 64,000 residents. Although the Belgian government attempted to depict Eupen-Malmedy as an ethnically Belgian territory, many Belgians were suspicious of the move.

In 1919, a Transitional Government was established for Eupen-Malmedy by the Belgian government. It was headed by a Belgian general, Herman Baltia. Under the terms of the Treaty, Belgian control over the territory was contingent on the result of a local plebiscite, held between January and June 1920. The plebiscite itself was held without a secret ballot, and organized as a consultation in which all citizens who opposed the annexation had to formally register their protest; just 271 of nearly 34,000 eligible voters did so. The League of Nations accepted the result and the Transitional Government prepared for the unification of Eupen-Malmedy with Belgium in June 1925.

The reaction of the German population to annexation varied. At the time most of the population considered the newly established Weimar Republic to be on a brink of collapse or a socialist revolution which led some activists to advocate for the creation of the Rhenish Republic ultimately created in 1923. Others argued in favour of Belgian annexation. This was based on the belief that this "seemed a more endearing prospect than being party to a revolutionary republic as was being fought over in Germany". Most of the local population was monarchist and Catholic.

Although largely indifferent to the referendum and annexation, the population of Eupen-Malmedy was split quite evenly into pro-Belgian and pro-German camps which reflected existing ideological divides. Catholics and socialists tended to support annexation into Belgium and were represented by newspapers such as Die Fliegende Taube, La Semaine and Die Arbeit. The pro-German position was represented by Liberal and secular circles, organised around newspapers such as Der Landbote and Eupener Zeitung.

Previously part of the Roman Catholic Archdiocese of Cologne, a separate Apostolic Administration of Eupen–Malmedy–Sankt Vith was founded in 1919. This became the separate Diocese of Eupen-Malmedy which was founded in July 1920. It was united with the Diocese of Liège and suppressed in April 1925.

=== Integration into Belgium, 1925–1940 ===
In June 1925, Eupen-Malmedy was finally incorporated into the Belgian state as part of Liège Province. The inhabitants of the region voted in its first Belgian general election in 1925 and returned a vote in favour of the centre-right Catholic Party. A regional centre-right political party known as the Christian People's Party (Christliche Volkspartei) had emerged by 1929.

The early Belgian administration of Eupen-Malmedy was paralleled by secret negotiations between Belgium and the Weimar German government of Gustav Stresemann over a possible return of the region in exchange for money. The negotiations collapsed in 1926 following the German signature of the Locarno Treaties (1925) guaranteeing Germany's western borders amid international pressure.

Various ethnic German organisations emerged in the Eupen-Malmedy region in the late 1920s, campaigning to promote German culture and the return of the territory to Germany. After the rise to power of Adolf Hitler's Nazi Party in Germany in 1933 and the revanchist campaign under the slogan Heim ins Reich (lit. 'Back Home to the Reich'), agitation in Eupen-Malmedy increased and many inhabitants began to wear swastika badges. Local socialists began to distance themselves from calls to return to Germany. In 1935, an openly pro-Nazi party emerged locally, known as the Homeland-Loyal Front (Heimattreue Front), which achieved a majority in all three of the Eupen-Malmedy districts in the elections of 1936 and 1939.

=== Annexed to Germany, 1940–1944 ===
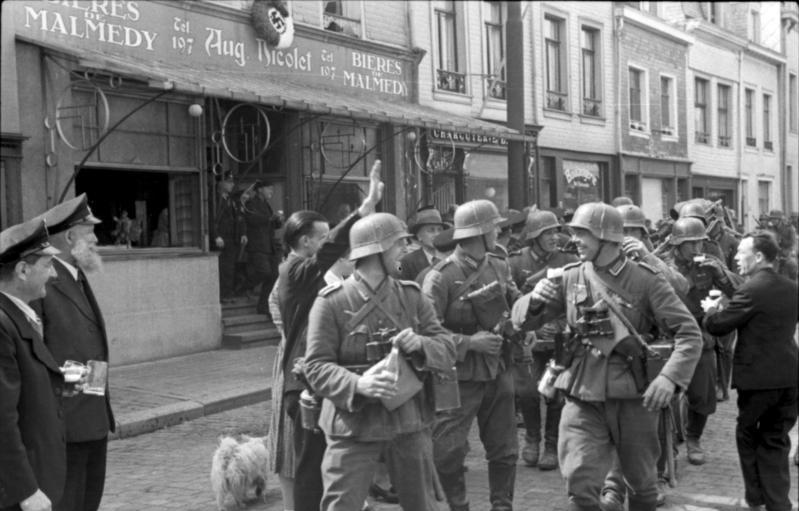
German soldiers welcomed into Malmedy in May 1940 with swastika decoration and Nazi salute

In World War II, Nazi Germany invaded Belgium in May 1940 and rapidly defeated and occupied Belgium for a second time. On 18 May, Eupen-Malmedy was re-integrated into Germany while the rest of the country remained under military occupation. The Belgian government in exile, however, refused to recognise the German annexation and maintained that Eupen-Malmedy was part of Belgium. Additionally, ten further communes of Belgium were also annexed by Germany.

Local support for the German takeover eroded sharply after the German invasion of the Soviet Union. Administered as part of Nazi Germany, 8,000 men in the region were conscripted into the German armed forces of whom 2,200 were killed on the Eastern Front.

After its first liberation in the fall of 1944, the region suffered severely during the Ardennes Offensive of 1944–45 and Sankt Vith, in particular, was nearly totally destroyed by bombing.

=== Return to Belgium, 1945–present ===
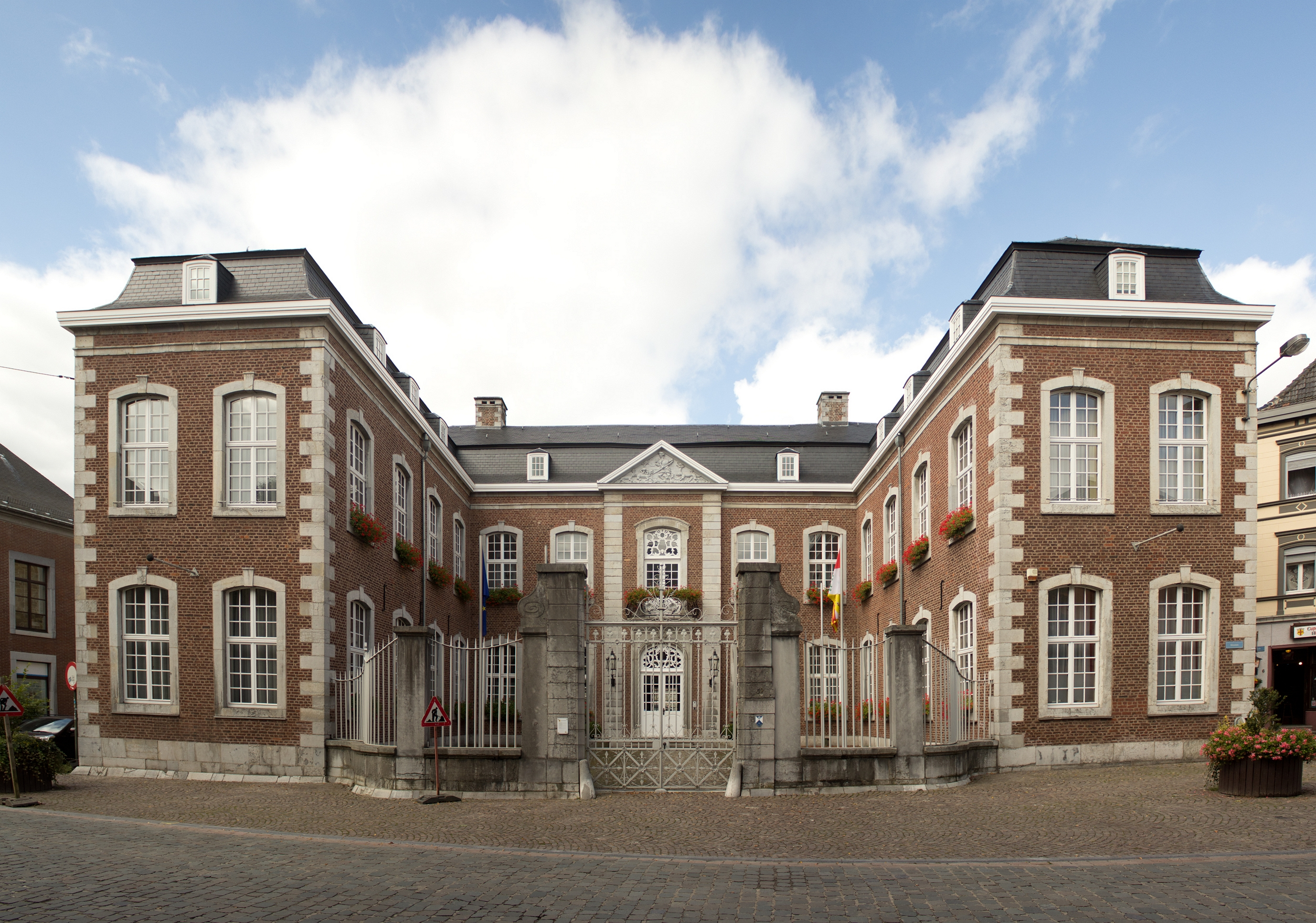
The seat of the German-speaking Community of Belgium in Eupen, created in 1984

After the war, the Belgian state reasserted sovereignty over the area, which caused the male inhabitants of the area who had served in the German army to lose their civil rights as "traitors to the Belgian state". After the war, the Belgian authorities opened 16,400 investigations into citizens from Eupen-Malmedy, representing around 25 percent of the region's entire population. In comparison, the figure for the rest of Belgium represented less than five percent.

After the war, demands to return Eupen-Malmedy to Germany faded. The first regionalist political party, the Party of German-speaking Belgians (Partei der Deutschsprachigen Belgier, or PDB), emerged in 1971 to argue that greater autonomy be given to Belgium's German speakers within the newly created federal state but not for regional secession or unification with what had become West Germany. The PDB's campaign culminated in the creation of the German-speaking Community of Belgium in 1984 which provided cultural autonomy to Belgium's 70,000 German speakers along the same lines as those already negotiated for Belgium's Dutch and French-speaking communities between 1971 and 1980. The nine German-speaking communes of the East Cantons form part of the German-speaking Community while Malmedy and Waimes are part of the French Community. There are protected rights for the minority language in both areas.

== Languages ==
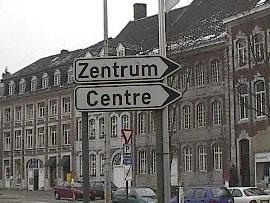
Bilingual German and French road signs in Eupen

The linguistic situation of the wider area is complex since it lies on the border between the Romance and Germanic languages and on an isogloss dividing several German dialects. In general, over the past decades, the local dialects have lost ground to German and French.

Historically, in Aubel, Baelen, Plombières, Welkenraedt (neighbouring Belgian municipalities), Eupen, Kelmis and Lontzen, the local languages have been classed as Limburgish, thus dialects of Low Franconian or Dutch. The inhabitants of Raeren have spoken Ripuarian and those of the district of Sankt Vith Moselle Franconian, which are dialects of High German. On the other hand, most of the people living in Malmedy and Waimes speak Walloon or French, with a minority of German speakers. Some of the folklore and carnival traditions there are still in the Walloon language. That is also the case for the children:

"The New Year's wishes have hardly been uttered when the children start going round from house to house in order to celebrate the three kings. The individual groups sing a song at the doors and demand a “lôtire” for their efforts, in other words a small sweetmeat. They sing in Walloon and say that the kings have sent them."

The East Cantons as a whole should therefore not be confused with the German language region created in 1963 or with the German-speaking Community of Belgium, which does not include the (smaller) Malmedy and Waimes areas.

== Current administration ==
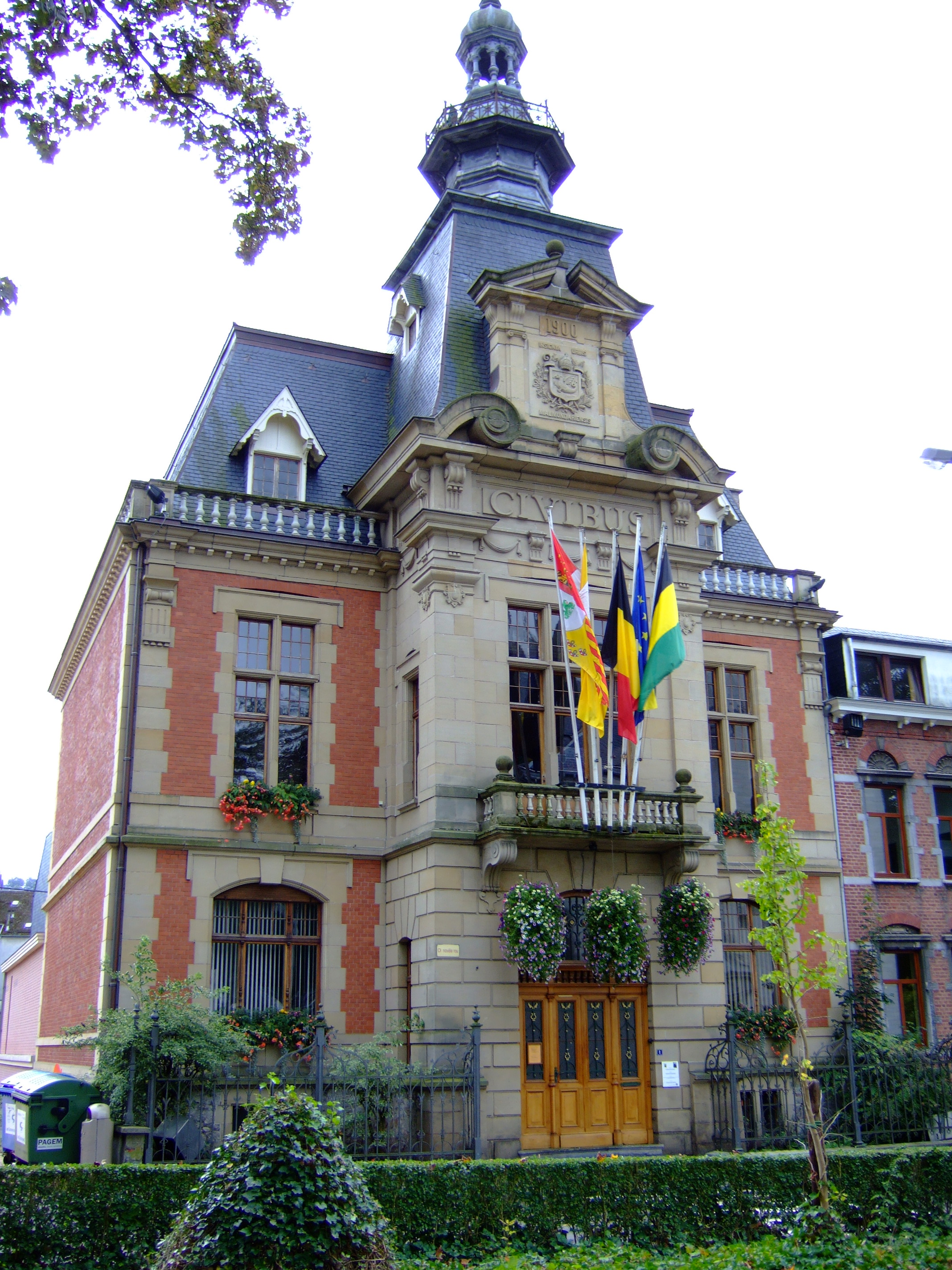
Modern view of the townhall of Malmedy, flying the Belgian flag

After becoming part of Belgium in the 1920s, the municipalities composing these territories were grouped into the three cantons of Eupen, Malmedy, and Sankt Vith. The administration was overhauled during the local government reforms of 1976–77, and are now administered as follows:

Canton of Eupen

- Eupen: Eupen and Kettenis
- Kelmis (in French La Calamine): Kelmis, Neu-Moresnet and Hergenrath
- Moresnet: Lontzen and Walhorn
- Raeren: Raeren, Eynatten and Hauset

Canton of Sankt Vith

- Sankt Vith (in French Saint-Vith): Sankt Vith, Crombach, Lommersweiler, Schönberg and Recht
- Bütgenbach (in French Butgenbach): Bütgenbach and Elsenborn
- Büllingen (in French Bullange): Büllingen, Manderfeld and Rocherath
- Amel (in French Amblève): Amel, Herresbach, Heppenbach and Meyerode
- Burg-Reuland: Reuland and Thommen

Canton of Malmedy

- Malmedy: Malmedy, Bévercé and Bellevaux-Ligneuville
- Waimes (in German Weismes): Waimes, Faymonville and Robertville

Linguistically, the Canton of Malmedy is mostly Francophone while the Cantons of Eupen and Sankt Vith are mostly Germanophone. When the three language-based communities of Belgium were created as part of the Belgian state reforms, Malmedy was placed in the French-speaking Community and Eupen and Sankt Vith were placed in the German-speaking Community. All the 11 municipalities of the East Cantons are "municipalities with language facilities", with the nine Germanophone municipalities also offering services in French and the two Francophone municipalities also offering services in German.

== See also ==
- Areas annexed by Nazi Germany
- Belgian annexation plans after the Second World War
- German-speaking Community of Belgium
- Low Dietsch
- Diocese of Eupen-Malmedy
- Principality of Stavelot-Malmedy
