= Land of Eupen =

Coordinates: 50.6667°N 6.0778°E

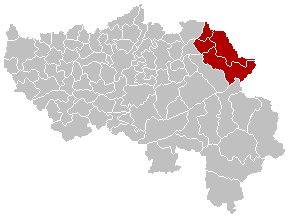
Municipalities in the Land of Eupen, province of Liège

The Land of Eupen or Eupen Land (Luxembourgish and German: Eupener Land, French: Pays d'Eupen, Dutch: Land van Eupen), corresponding to the Canton of Eupen (see Cantons of Belgium), is the northern part of the German-speaking Community of Belgium, lying on the border with Germany. It consists of Eupen, Kelmis, Lontzen and Raeren. Eupen is the capital of the Eupen of Land. To the south lies the Canton of Sankt Vith, which makes up the rest of the German-speaking Community.

The southern parts of the municipalities of Eupen and Raeren are home to large forest areas and the Lake Eupen, one of the largest lakes in Belgium. Towards the south, the landscape rises and merges into the High Fens. The HSL 3 high-speed railway line and the A3 motorway between Liège and Aachen run across the Eupen region.

In the Land of Eupen, the spoken languages are German and the dialect Ripuarian, which is also spoken in neighbouring part of Germany and a couple of municipalities in Dutch Limburg, like Kerkrade and Vaals.

== Municipalities in the Land of Eupen ==
- Eupen (with Kettenis)
- Kelmis (La Calamine) (with Neu-Moresnet and Hergenrath)
- Lontzen (with Herbestal and Walhorn)
- Raeren (with Eynatten and Hauset)

== See also ==
- Land of Herve
- Voerstreek
- East Cantons
