= 1939 Belgian general election =

← 1936	2 April 1939	1946 →
- Chamber of Representatives
- All 202 seats in the Chamber of Representatives
Party	Leader	Vote %	Seats	+/–
PC–KVV	Hubert Pierlot	32.71	73	+12
Labour	Paul-Henri Spaak	30.19	64	−6
Liberal	Émile Coulonvaux	17.19	33	+10
VNV	Staf De Clercq	8.28	17	+1
PVDA-PTB	Collective leadership	5.36	9	0
Rexist	Léon Degrelle	4.44	4	−17
Technocrat	Leo Frenssen		1	New
Veterans			1	New
This lists parties that won seats. See the complete results below.
- Senate
- All 101 seats in the Senate
Party	Leader	Vote %	Seats	+/–
Catholic	Hubert Pierlot	30.71	35	+1
Labour	Paul-Henri Spaak	30.64	35	−4
Liberal	Émile Coulonvaux	17.57	16	+5
VNV	Staf De Clercq	7.76	8	+3
PVDA-PTB	Collective leadership	5.04	3	−1
Rexist	Léon Degrelle	4.13	1	−7
KVV	Alfons Verbist	2.75	3	New
This lists parties that won seats. See the complete results below.
Government before	Government after election
Spaak I National Unity (Lab–Catholic–Lib)	Pierlot I Catholic–Lab

General elections were held in Belgium on 2 April 1939. The result was a victory for the Catholic Party, which won 67 of the 202 seats in the Chamber of Representatives. Voter turnout was 93.3%.

On 22 February 1939, the Pierlot Government succeeded the Spaak Government. The Spaak Government was in a political crisis caused by, among other things, the Martens Affair. As the Pierlot Government fell as well and the ministers failed to form a stable government, King Leopold III insisted on a dissolution of parliament, but the council of ministers refused due to fear of electoral losses. It was not Prime Minister Pierlot, but the Minister of the Interior who provided the required contresignant of the royal order of 6 March 1939 which dissolved the Chambers and triggered the snap elections.

After the election, Pierlot continued as Prime Minister. The elections were the last before World War II.

== Results ==
=== Chamber of Representatives ===
Party	Votes	%	Seats	+/–
Catholic Party	764,843	32.71	67	+6
Catholic Flemish People's Party	764,843	32.71	6	New
Belgian Labour Party	705,969	30.19	64	–6
Liberal Party	401,991	17.19	33	+10
Vlaamsch Nationaal Verbond	193,528	8.28	17	+1
Communist Party of Belgium	125,428	5.36	9	0
Rexist Party	103,821	4.44	4	–17
Heimattreue Front	7,733	0.33	0	New
Technocrat Party	35,124	1.50	1	New
Veterans	35,124	1.50	1	New
Walloon Party	35,124	1.50	0	New
Socialist dissidents	35,124	1.50	0	0
Liberal dissidents	35,124	1.50	0	New
Revolutionary Socialist Action	35,124	1.50	0	0
Lahaut List	35,124	1.50	0	New
Liste De Keyser (Tchno)	35,124	1.50	0	New
Walloon Dissident Party	35,124	1.50	0	New
Verbist	35,124	1.50	0	New
Independents	35,124	1.50	0	0
Total	2,338,437	100.00	202	0
Valid votes	2,338,437	93.96		
Invalid/blank votes	150,442	6.04		
Total votes	2,488,879	100.00		
Registered voters/turnout	2,667,341	93.31		
Source: Mackie & Rose, Belgian Elections

=== Senate ===
Party	Votes	%	Seats	+/–
Catholic Party	703,250	30.71	35	+1
Belgian Labour Party	701,552	30.64	35	–4
Liberal Party	402,326	17.57	16	+5
Vlaamsch Nationaal Verbond	177,666	7.76	8	+3
Communist Party of Belgium	115,308	5.04	3	–1
Rexist Party	94,543	4.13	1	–7
Catholic Flemish People's Party	62,976	2.75	3	New
Independents	32,209	1.41	0	0
Total	2,289,830	100.00	101	0
Valid votes	2,289,830	92.00		
Invalid/blank votes	199,033	8.00		
Total votes	2,488,863	100.00		
Registered voters/turnout	2,667,341	93.31		
Source: Belgian Elections
