= Herbesthal =

Herbestal
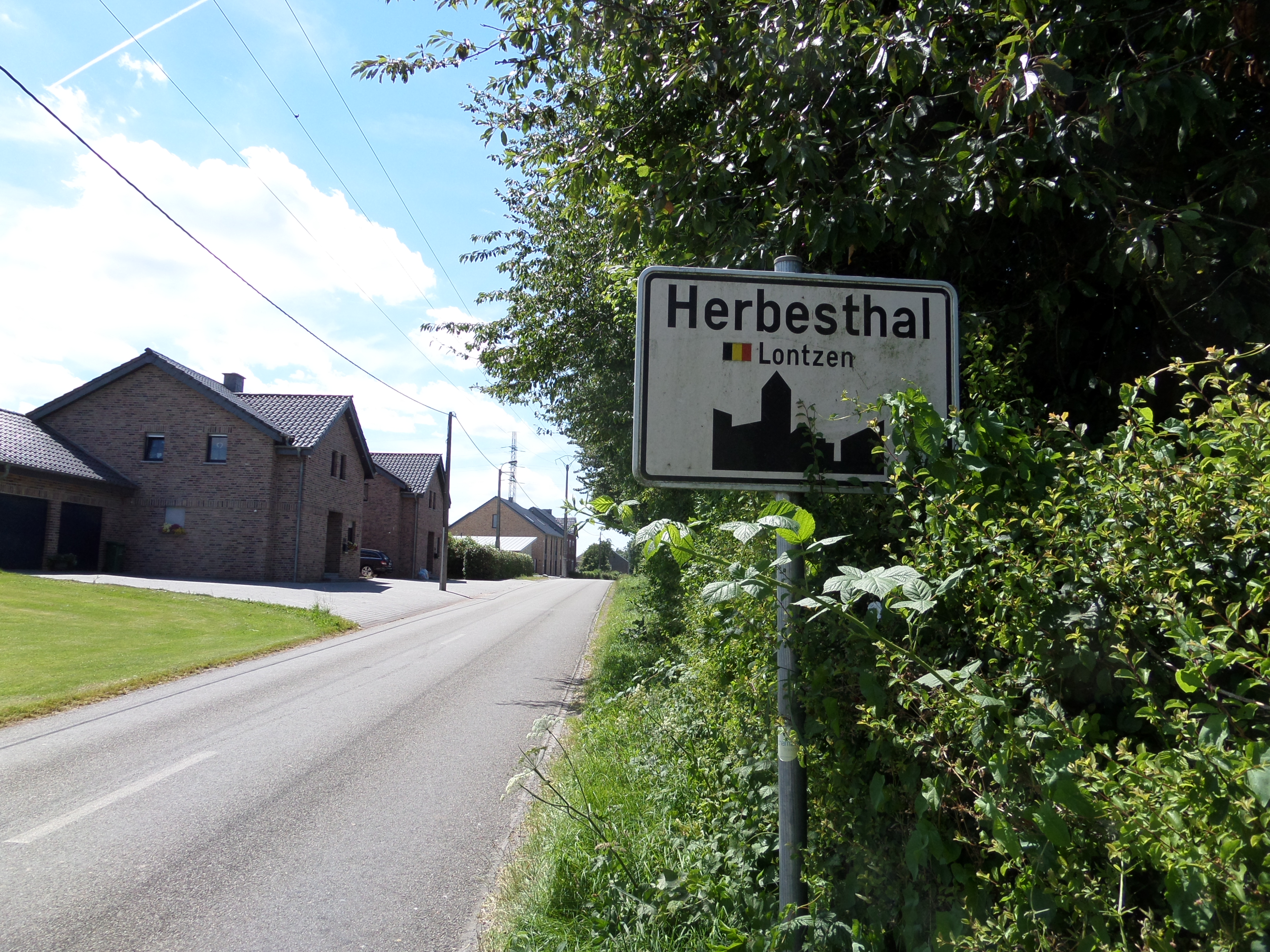

- Location in Belgium
- Country: Belgium
- Region: Wallonia
- Community: German-speaking Community of Belgium
- Province: Liège
- Arrondissement: Verviers
- Municipality: Lontzen
- Postal codes: 4711
- Area codes: 087

Herbesthal (German pronunciation: [ˈhɛʁbəsˌtaːl]) is a village in the municipality of Lontzen, East Belgium.

== Etymology ==
The origin of the name of Herbesthal is uncertain. The place is first mentioned in the State Archives of Liège under the name "Hardwestal" (1404-1405). Various sources link the name to the following meanings: "Hostel in the valley", "Herbes Valley", "Herbert's place of residence" (the word "stal" in Germanic means residence) or even "Eggental" (the harrow is an agricultural implement). When the village was under French rule (1794-1814), it was called "Aubergeval", which can be translated as "hostel in the valley".

== International importance ==
Between 1843 and 1920, Herbesthal was the location of what was, by various criteria, the world's oldest international railway station. It lost that status because of frontier changes mandated at Versailles. (Note: See treaty summary articles 32-34)
