= Heimattreue Front =

The Heimattreue Front (Patriotic Front) was a political party established in 1935 as a successor to the Christliche Volkspartei which demanded the attachment of the Belgian East Cantons to Germany, from which they had been detached in 1920. It was absorbed into the Nazi Party in May 1940, after the occupation by Nazi Germany.

== Background ==
In the 1930s, the tension between those in favour of remaining in Belgium and those in favour of joining Germany increased to such an extent that four leaders of the Heimatbund, including the former chairman of the Christliche Volkspartei, A. Josef Dehottay, were deported to Germany and stripped of their Belgian nationality in 1935. As a result, this party did not field any candidates in the 1936 legislative elections and called on people to join the Heimattreue Front, which advocated a blank vote. The blank votes won an absolute majority, while the Catholic Party won 53% of the votes cast, the Parti ouvrier belge (POB) 12.7% and the Rexists 26.4%.

In the next elections, in 1939, the Catholic Party obtained 38.6%, the POB 4% and the Liberal Party 3.4%, while the Heimattreue Front obtained 45.1% of the vote, which was not as absolute a success as in other German-speaking regions bordering Germany, such as the Territory of the Saar Basin (Deutsche Front), Sudetenland (Sudeten German Party), Free City of Danzig and Memel Territory (Memelländische Einheitsliste).

Results of the 1939 parliamentary elections

	Canton of Eupen		Canton of Saint-Vith		Canton of Malmedy		Verviers district	
Party	votes	%	votes	%	votes	%	voice	%
Heimattreue Front	3,219	48.67 %	2,073	44.73 %	2,441	43.09 %	8,057	11.83 %
Catholic Party	2,526	38.19 %	1,948	43.04 %	2,056	36.29 %	21,701	31.85 %
Rex	276	4.17 %	439	9.47 %	438	7.73 %	4,806	7.05 %
Socialist Party	265	4.1 %	140	3.02 %	288	5.8 %	14,779	21.69 %
Liberal Party	221	3.34 %	23	0.5 %	378	6.67 %	11,835	17.37 %
Communist Party	107	1.62 %	11	0.24 %	64	1.13 %	6.948	10.2 %
Valid votes	6,614		4,634		5,665		68,127	

== Under the Nazi occupation ==
The departed or deposed Belgian mayors were replaced after may 1940 by Heimattreue Front activists, e.g. in Eupen, Ortsgruppenleiter Walter Rexroth, Kreisleiter Wilhelm Buhrke in Malmedy and Franz Genten in Sankt-Vith, although the 2 latter were removed in the autumn 1940.
