= Catholic Flemish People's Party =

Former Belgian Catholic political party

The Catholic Flemish People's Party (Dutch: Katholieke Vlaamse Volkspartij, KVV) was a political party within the Catholic Block in Belgium from 1936 until 1945.

== History ==
The party was formed in 1936 following the defeat of the Catholic Party at the 1936 general elections as a Flemish faction of the party. Together with the Francophone Catholic Social Party, the two factions formed the Catholic Bloc. In the 1939 general elections the combined Catholic Bloc won 67 seats. The KVV won a further six seats in the Chamber of Representatives and three seats in the Senate running alone. It did not contest any further elections, as following World War II the two parties merged into the Christian Social Party.
