= Technocrat Party =

Belgian political party

The Technocrat Party (Dutch: Technocratische Partij) was a political party in Belgium led by Leo Frenssen.

== History ==
The party created a surprise by winning 21,000 votes and six seats on Antwerp city council in the 1938 municipal elections. In the general elections the following year it received 0.6% of the national vote and won a single seat in the Chamber of Representatives. The party did not contest any further elections.
