= List of protected heritage sites in Lontzen =

This table shows an overview of the protected heritage sites in the Walloon town Lontzen. This list is part of Belgium's national heritage.

| Object | Year/architect | Town/section | Address | Coordinates | Number | Image |
|---|---|---|---|---|---|---|
| Belgian-Prussian border marker 187 ^{(nl)} ^{(de)} | | Lontzen | | 50.308639°N 6.013061°E | 31215 Info | Belgian-Prussian border marker 187 |
| house ^{(nl)} ^{(de)} | | Lontzen | Kirchstrasse 28 | 50.660983°N 5.983744°E | 31430 Info | house |
| St. Hubert Church, and 18th century tombstones ^{(nl)} ^{(de)} | | Lontzen | | 50.680219°N 6.008514°E | 31435 Info | St. Hubert Church, and 18th century tombstones |
| St. Stephen's church and tombstones from the 16th to 18th centuries ^{(nl)} ^{(de)} | | Lontzen | | 50.675216°N 6.046055°E | 31350 Info | St. Stephen's church and tombstones from the 16th to 18th centuries |
| Rectory ^{(nl)} ^{(de)} | | Lontzen | | 50.675216°N 6.046055°E | 31445 Info | Rectory |
| St. Anne Chapel ^{(nl)} ^{(de)} | | Lontzen | | 50.683817°N 5.990505°E | 31446 Info | St. Anne Chapel |
| house ^{(nl)} ^{(de)} | | Lontzen | Dorfstrasse 44 | 50.674626°N 6.046422°E | 31351 Info | house |
| Chapel of St. John the Baptist and surroundings ^{(nl)} ^{(de)} | | Lontzen | Astenet | 50.691102°N 6.033745°E | 31352 Info | Chapel of St. John the Baptist and surroundings |
| "Weiss Haus" house ^{(nl)} ^{(de)} | | Lontzen | | 50.684309°N 5.955161°E | 31347 Info | "Weiss Haus" house |
| Castle Thor and surrounding area with park ^{(nl)} ^{(de)} | | Lontzen | Astenet | 50.690468°N 6.033056°E | 31353 Info | Castle Thor and surrounding area with park |
| house ^{(nl)} ^{(de)} | | Lontzen | Waldstrasse 11 | 50.688753°N 5.996889°E | 31348 Info | house |
| Mützhof house ^{(nl)} ^{(de)} | | Lontzen | Astenet | 50.691299°N 6.034383°E | 31431 Info | Mützhof house |
| Castle Lontzen ^{(nl)} ^{(de)} | | Lontzen | | 50.679734°N 6.010998°E | 31433 Info | Castle Lontzen |
| Backofen Gut bakery ^{(nl)} ^{(de)} | | Lontzen | Windsweg 21 | 50.687093°N 5.964100°E | 31349 Info | Backofen Gut bakery |
| Neuschmiede Barn ^{(nl)} ^{(de)} | | Lontzen | | 50.690311°N 6.032054°E | 31355 Info | Neuschmiede Barn |
| Hof Himmelsplatz complex ^{(nl)} ^{(de)} | | Lontzen | | 50.700269°N 6.034913°E | 31356 Info | Hof Himmelsplatz complex |
| Galmeitrift, or "Pelempelter Büschgen" ^{(nl)} ^{(de)} | | Lontzen | Rabotrath | 50.669114°N 6.015096°E | 31048 Info | Galmeitrift, or "Pelempelter Büschgen" |
| Heesgasse ^{(nl)} ^{(de)} | | Lontzen | | 50.676265°N 6.014326°E | 31432 Info | Heesgasse |
| Chapel Caterina from Siena ^{(de)} | | Lontzen | Astenet | 50.698353°N 6.033938°E | 40799 Info | Chapel Caterina from Siena |

== See also ==
- Lists of protected heritage sites in the German-speaking Community of Belgium
- List of protected heritage sites in Liège (province)
- Lontzen
