= Belgian Eifel =

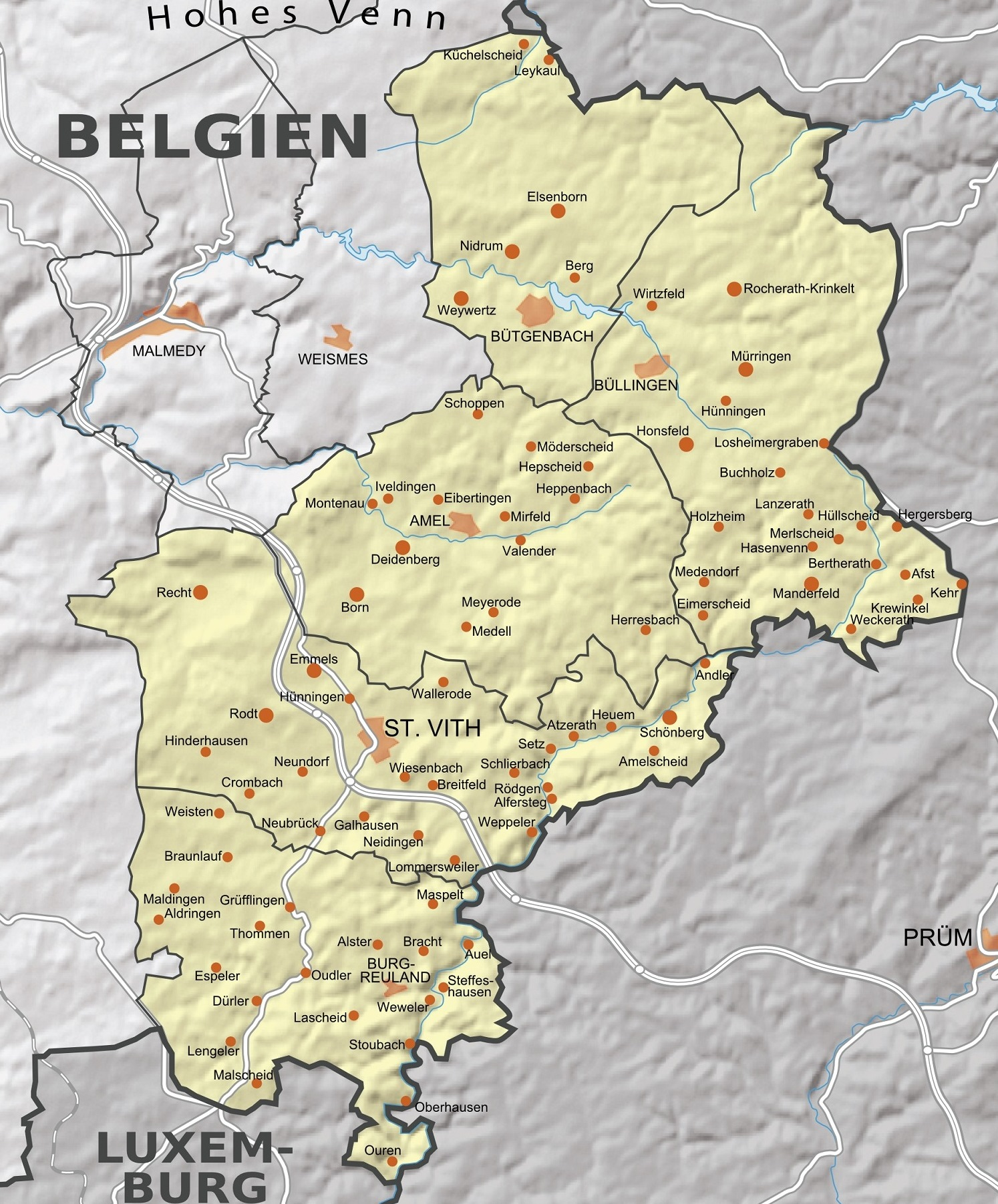
The canton of Sankt Vith is also labelled as the Belgian Eifel

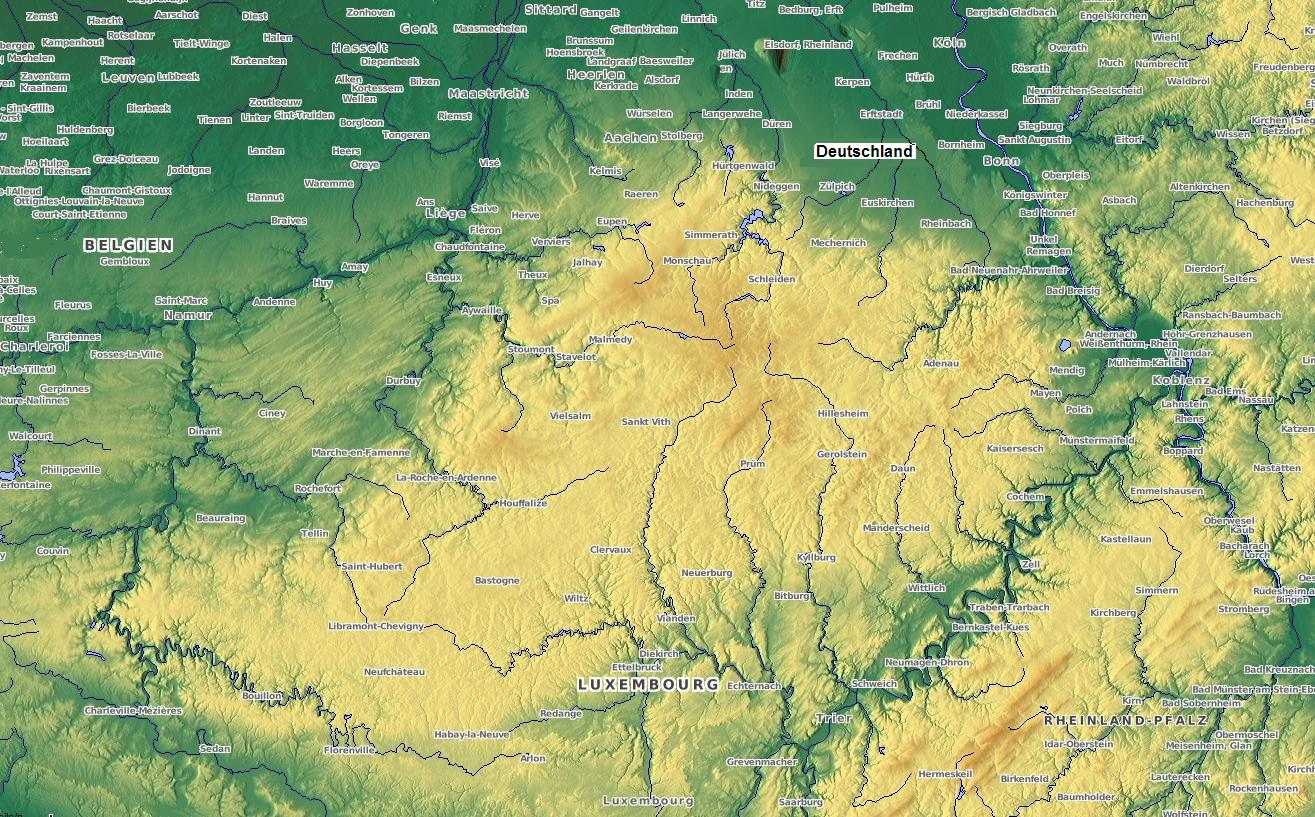
In the centre the cross-border highlands of the Ardennes and the Eifel, bounded by the Meuse, Semois, Moselle and Rhine

The Belgian Eifel (German: belgische Eifel, Luxembourgish: Belscher Äifel) in the German-speaking part of Belgium generally refers to the southern part of the German-speaking community which forms the Canton of Sankt Vith (German: Kanton Sankt Vith; French: Canton de Saint-Vit). According to this definition the municipalities of Amel, Büllingen, Burg-Reuland, Bütgenbach and Sankt Vith belong to the Belgian Eifel. This very rural area is very sparsely populated, unlike the northern part of the German-speaking community, Eupener Land.

However, the term Belgian Eifel can also refer more generally to that part of the North and West Eifel that lies within Belgium. The term is not used consistently, however, because its boundary with the Ardennes in the area of the High Fens is rather fluid.

The following areas may be considered part of the Belgian Eifel:

- Part of the Zitterwald (western section of the North Eifel), where this upland area runs into Belgium towards Bütgenbach
- The westernmost part of the Schnee Eifel (Ommerwald) and the German-speaking area around Sankt Vith
- The High Fens (German: Hohes Venn; French: Hautes Fagnes), although this can be considered part of the Ardennes
- Geologically and geographically the Land of Eupen can also be counted as part of the Eifel, even if its inhabitants would not class themselves as living within it.
- A small part of the Ösling (hill country in northern Luxembourg).

== See also ==
- Bitburg-Prüm
- Schneifel
- South Eifel
