= German-speaking Community of Belgium =

Linguistic community of Belgium

Coordinates: 50°38′N 06°02′E

German-speaking Community Deutschsprachige Gemeinschaft
- Community
- Flag Coat of arms

- Location within Belgium (dark green)
- Interactive map of German-speaking Community
- Country: Belgium
- Region: Wallonia
- Established: 1984
- Capital: Eupen

Government
  - Executive: Government of the German-speaking Community
  - Governing parties (2024–2029): ProDG, CSP, PFF
  - Minister-President: Oliver Paasch (ProDG)
  - Legislature: Parliament of the German-speaking Community
  - Speaker: Patricia Creutz-Vilvoye (CSP)

Area
  - Total: 854 km^{2} (330 sq mi)

Population (1 January 2024)
  - Total: 79,479
  - Density: 93.1/km^{2} (241/sq mi)
- Day of the German-speaking Community: 15 November
- Official language: German
- Other language: French (Note: Language facilities for French speakers in Amel, Büllingen, Burg-Reuland, Bütgenbach, Eupen, Kelmis, Lontzen, Raeren and Sankt Vith.)
- Website: ostbelgienlive.be

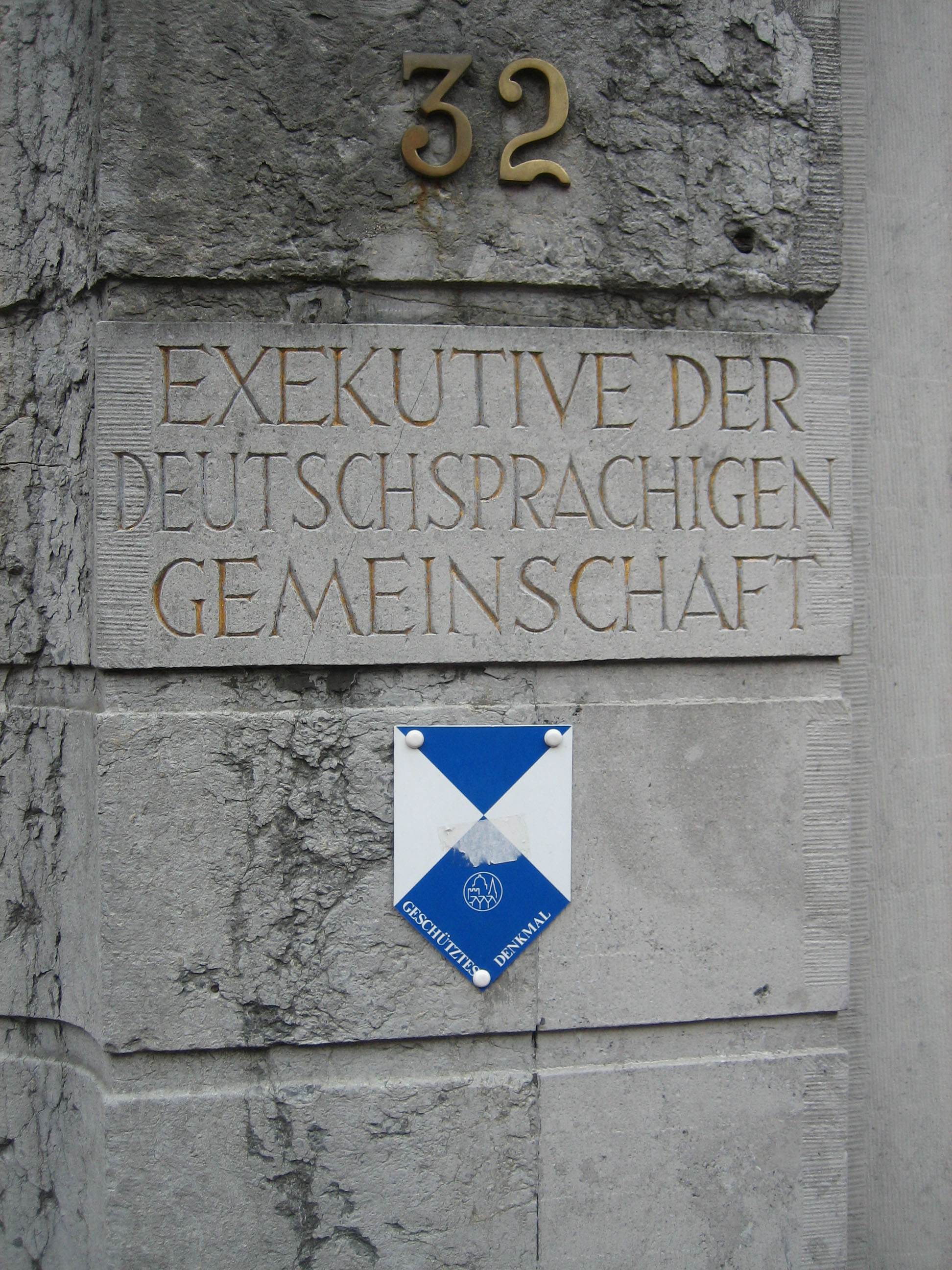
The Executive (government) of the German-speaking Community meets in Eupen.

The German-speaking Community (German: Deutschsprachige Gemeinschaft (Belgiens), pronounced [ˈdɔʏtʃˌʃpʁaːxɪɡə ɡəˈmaɪnʃaft ˈbɛlɡi̯əns], DG), (Note: French: Communauté germanophone (de Belgique) [kɔmynote ʒɛʁmanofɔn də bɛlʒik]; Dutch: Duitstalige Gemeenschap (van België) [ˈdœytsˌtaːlɪɣə ɣəˈmeːnˌsxɑp vɑm ˈbɛlɣijə].) also known as East Belgium (German: Ostbelgien [ˈɔstˌbɛlɡi̯ən]), (Note: French: Belgique de l'Est [bɛlʒik də lɛst]; Dutch: Oost-België [ˌoːstˈbɛlɣijə].) is one of the three federal communities of Belgium. The community comprises nine municipalities in Liège Province, Wallonia, within the Eupen-Malmedy region in Eastern Belgium. The primary language of the community is German, making this one of the three official languages in Belgium. Traditionally the community and the wider area around it forms an intersection of various local languages and/or dialects, namely Limburgish, Ripuarian and Moselle Franconian varieties. The community has an area of 854 km^{2} (330 sq mi), and has a population of around 79,000 (as of January 2024) – about 7.0% of Liège Province and about 0.7% of the national total.

Bordering the Netherlands, Germany and Luxembourg, the area has its own parliament and government at Eupen. The German-speaking Community of Belgium was ceded by Germany in the 1920 Treaty of Versailles. There are also some other areas where German is spoken that belonged to Belgium before 1920, but these are not part of the German-speaking Community. This category includes the Bleiberg-Welkenraedt-Baelen area in the northeastern part of the province of Liège, as well as Arelerland (the city of Arlon and some nearby villages in the southeastern portion of the province of Belgian Luxembourg). However, German is declining in these areas outside of the core German-speaking Community due to the expansion of French.

== History ==
The area known today as the East Cantons consists of the German-speaking Community and the municipalities of Malmedy and Waimes (German: Weismes), which belong to the French Community of Belgium. The East Cantons were part of the Rhine Province of Prussia in the German Empire until 1920 (as the counties (Landkreise) of Eupen and Malmedy), but were annexed by Belgium following Germany's defeat in World War I and the subsequent Treaty of Versailles. Thus they also became known as the cantons rédimés, "redeemed cantons". The peace treaty of Versailles demanded the "questioning" of the local population. People who were unwilling to become Belgians and wanted the region to remain a part of Germany were required to register themselves along with their full name and address with the Belgian military administration, headed by Herman Baltia, and many feared reprisals or even expulsion for doing so.

In the mid-1920s, there were secret negotiations between Germany and the kingdom of Belgium that seemed to be inclined to sell the region back to Germany as a way to improve Belgium's finances. A price of 200 million gold marks has been mentioned. At this point, the French government, fearing for the stability of the broader postwar order, intervened with Brussels and the Belgian-German talks were called off.

The new cantons had been part of Belgium for just 20 years when, in 1940, they were retaken by Germany in World War II. The majority of people of the east cantons welcomed this as they considered themselves German. Following the defeat of Germany in 1945, the cantons were once again annexed by Belgium, and as a result of alleged collaboration with Nazi Germany an attempt was made to de-Germanize the local population by the Belgian and Walloon authorities.

Eupen-Malmedy area and other German territories lost in both World Wars are shown in black, present-day Germany is marked dark grey on this 1914 map.

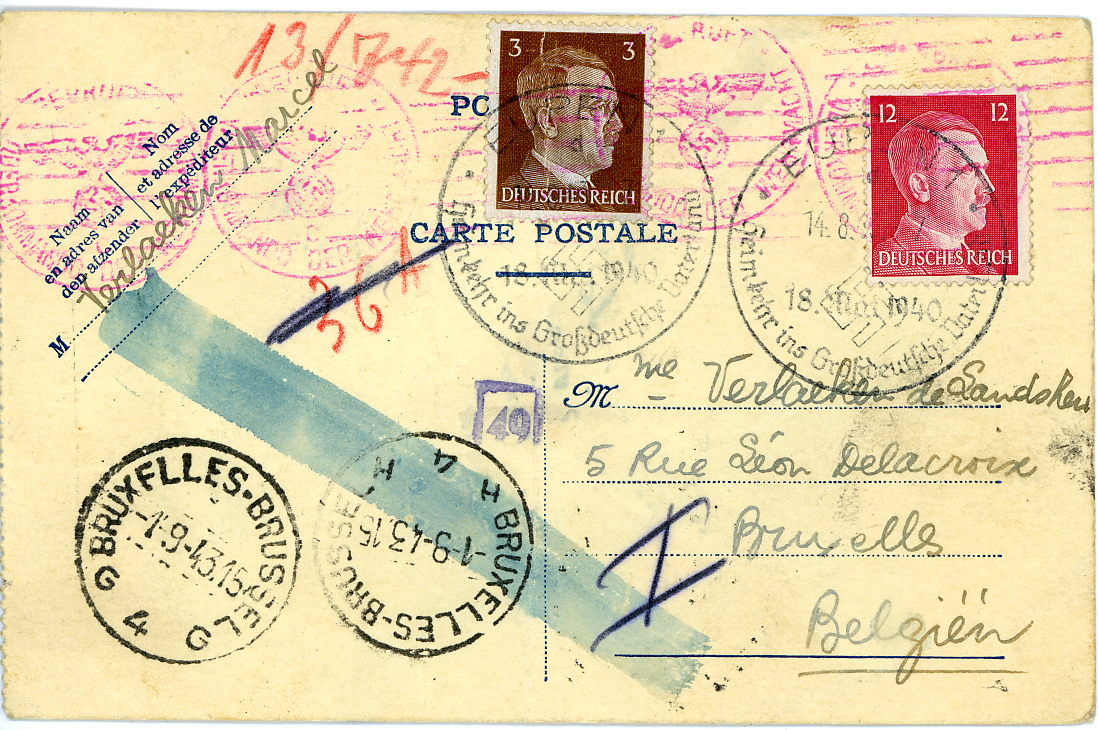
1943 postcard; Nazi propaganda postmark reads Heimkehr ins Großdeutsche Vaterland ("Return to the Greater-German Fatherland")

In the early 1960s, Belgium was divided into four linguistic areas, the Dutch-speaking Flemish area, the French-speaking area, the bilingual capital of Brussels, and the German-speaking area of the east cantons. In 1973, three communities and three regions were established and granted internal autonomy. The legislative Parliament of the German-speaking Community, Rat der Deutschsprachigen Gemeinschaft, was set up. Today the German-speaking Community has a fair degree of autonomy, especially in language and cultural matters, but it still remains part of the region of predominantly French-speaking Wallonia. There has been much argument in the past few years that the German-speaking Community should also become its own region, which is an ongoing process with the permanent transfer with the previous accord of some competences concerning social policy, conservation of sites and monuments, environment protection policy, transport, the financing of municipalities, among other things from the Walloon Region. One of the proponents of full regional autonomy for the German-speaking Community is Karl-Heinz Lambertz, the minister-president from 1999 to 2014. According to the government of the German-speaking Community, special consideration should be given to regional autonomy for spatial planning, city building, and housing.

== Geography ==
=== Location ===
The territory of the German-speaking Community is bounded on the north by the Belgium-Germany-Netherlands border tripoint, on the east by Germany and on the south by Luxembourg, and on the west by the territory of the French-speaking Community of Belgium.

Within Belgium, the German-speaking Community exercises its political powers on the German-speaking territory, which comprises nine municipalities. Eupen is the seat of the government, the parliament and the administrative centre.

The municipalities of Malmedy and Weismes belong to the territorial community of the French Community of Belgium. The German minority has its own rights there. Occasionally, the nine German-speaking communities, together with the communities of Malmedy and Weismes, are historically called East Belgium or East Cantons because of their common political past, formerly also as Eupen-Malmedy-St. Vith.

In March 2017, the government of the German-speaking community decided to market the area as East Belgium. Analogous to South Tyrol (officially: Autonomous Province of Bolzano – South Tyrol), the name of the German-speaking Community of Belgium will continue to be used on official documents, on the external presentation, on the Internet and on the official posters of the ministry, the government and the parliament.

== Government ==
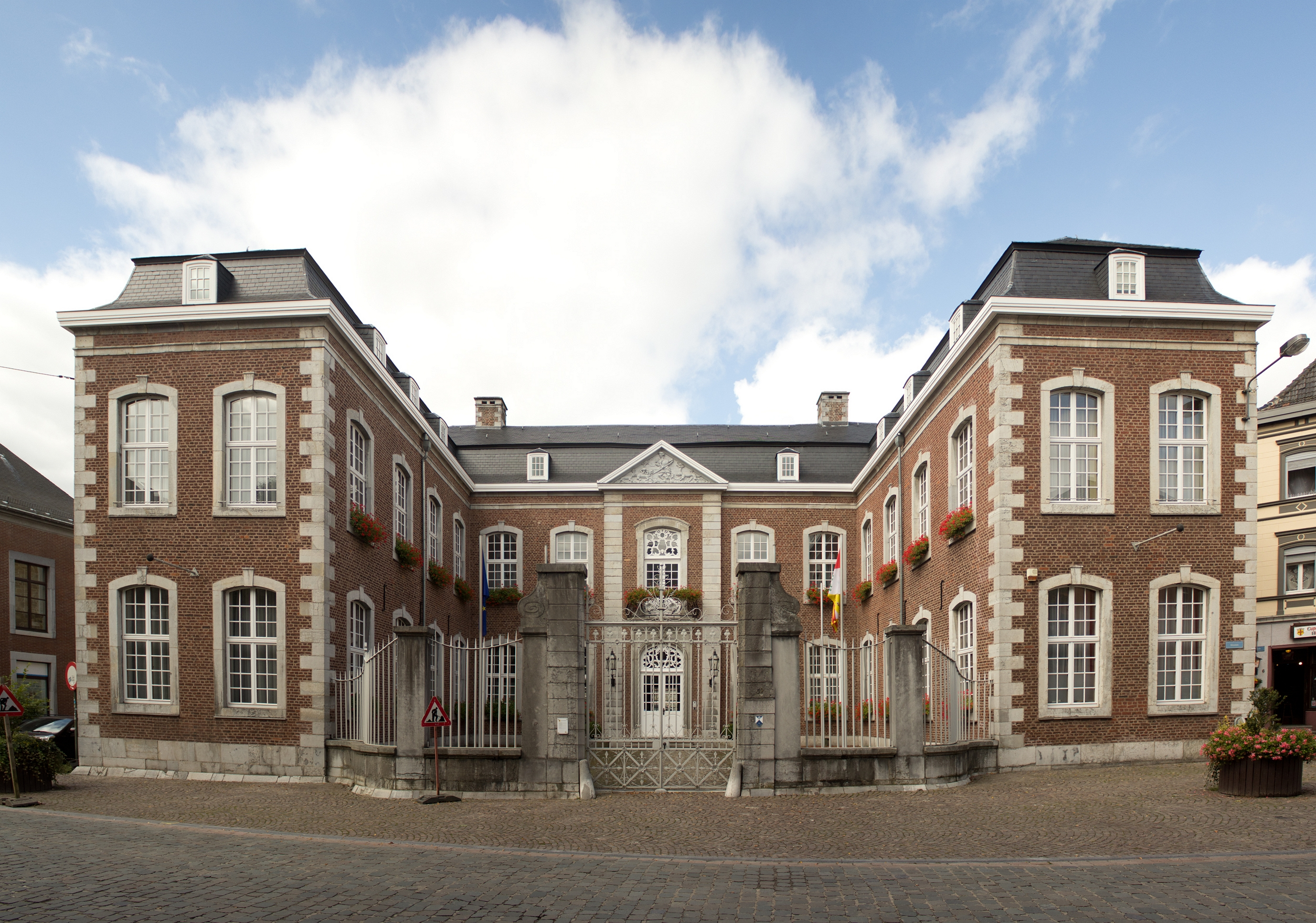
The seat of the Executive and Council of the German-speaking Community in Eupen

The German-speaking Community has its own government, which is appointed for five years by its own parliament. The government is headed by a minister-president, who acts as the "prime minister" of the community, and is assisted by the Ministry of the German-speaking Community. The 2024–2029 government is formed by four ministers:

- Oliver Paasch (ProDG), Minister-President and Minister for Local Government
- Gregor Freches (PFF), Minister for Culture, Media and Tourism
- Lydia Klinkenberg (ProDG), Minister for Family, Social Affairs, Housing and Health
- Jérôme Franssen (CSP), Minister for Education, Training and Employment

=== Municipalities ===
The German-speaking Community consists of nine municipalities, listed in the table below. Numbers on the map to the right correspond to the "Map #" column in the table below.

Map #	Municipality	Canton	Population (2020)	Area (km^{2})	Area (sq mi)
5	Amel	Sankt Vith	▲5,486	125.15	48.32
6	Büllingen	Sankt Vith	▼5,456	150.49	58.10
7	Burg-Reuland	Sankt Vith	▲3,974	108.96	42.07
8	Bütgenbach	Sankt Vith	▲5,629	97.31	37.57
1	Eupen	Eupen	▲19,762	103.74	40.05
2	Kelmis	Eupen	▲11,212	18.12	7.00
3	Lontzen	Eupen	▲5,833	28.73	11.09
4	Raeren	Eupen	▲10,818	74.21	28.65
9	St. Vith	Sankt Vith	▲9,779	146.93	56.73
Total			▲77,949	853.64	329.59

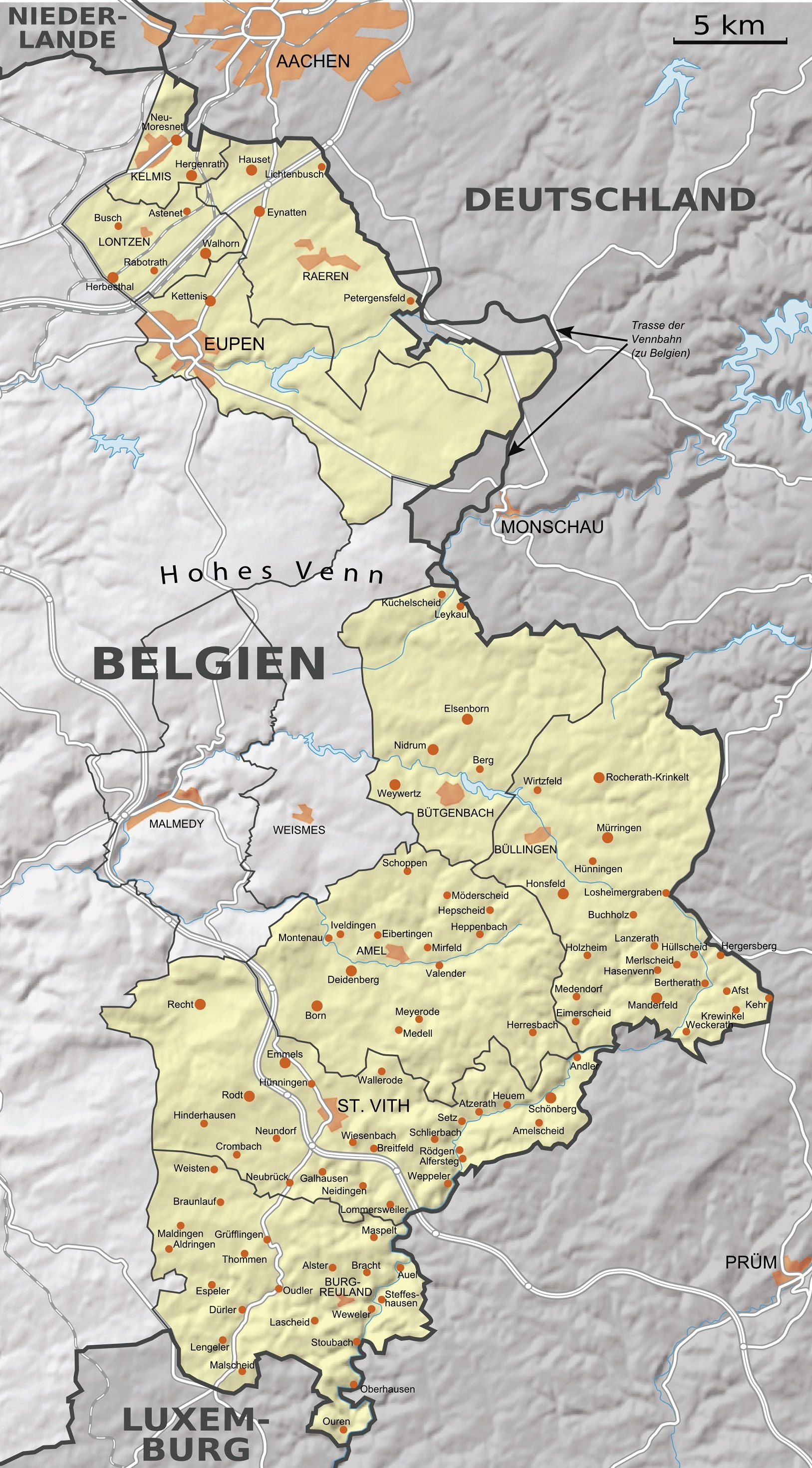
The Yellow municipalities are the German-Speaking community of Belgium, while the two grey municipalities (Malmedy and Weismes) were annexed from Germany after World War I as well, but natively speak French.

(▲▼ = comparable to previous year).

The population figures are those on 1 January 2020 (compare to a total of 73,675 on 1 January 2007). The municipalities are grouped into two cantons, namely the Canton of Eupen in the north and the Canton of Sankt Vith in the south. The wider region is included in the Arrondissement of Verviers.

== Demographics ==
In 2007, 73,675 inhabitants (86.3 inhabitants / km^{2}) lived in the area of the German-speaking community. However, the population density in the canton of Eupen (north) and the canton of St. Vith (south) is very different:

- District of Eupen: 44 159 inhabitants – 196.4 inhabitants / km^{2}.
- District of St. Vith: 29 516 inhabitants – 46.9 inhabitants / km^{2}

The north–south demographic gap is particularly evident when comparing the North and South of the community:

- The most densely populated municipality is Kelmis (577.9 inhabitants / km^{2});
- The least densely populated municipality is Büllingen (36.2 inhabitants / km^{2}).

By comparison, the population density is 346.7 in Belgium, 204.0 in Wallonia and 452.4 in Flanders. Men represent 49.72% with a slightly lower proportion of the total population of the German-speaking community, women are in the majority with 50.28%.

As of 2020 over 21% of the community was foreign-born, with Germans representing the overwhelming majority of that group, followed by Turks.

== See also ==
- Parliament of the German-speaking Community and Government of the German-speaking Community
- Minister-President of the German-speaking Community
- German-speaking electoral college (European Parliament constituency)
- German-speaking Europe
- German diaspora
- Belgischer Rundfunk
- Lists of protected heritage sites in the German-speaking Community of Belgium
- Belgian annexation plans after the Second World War
