= Kettenis =

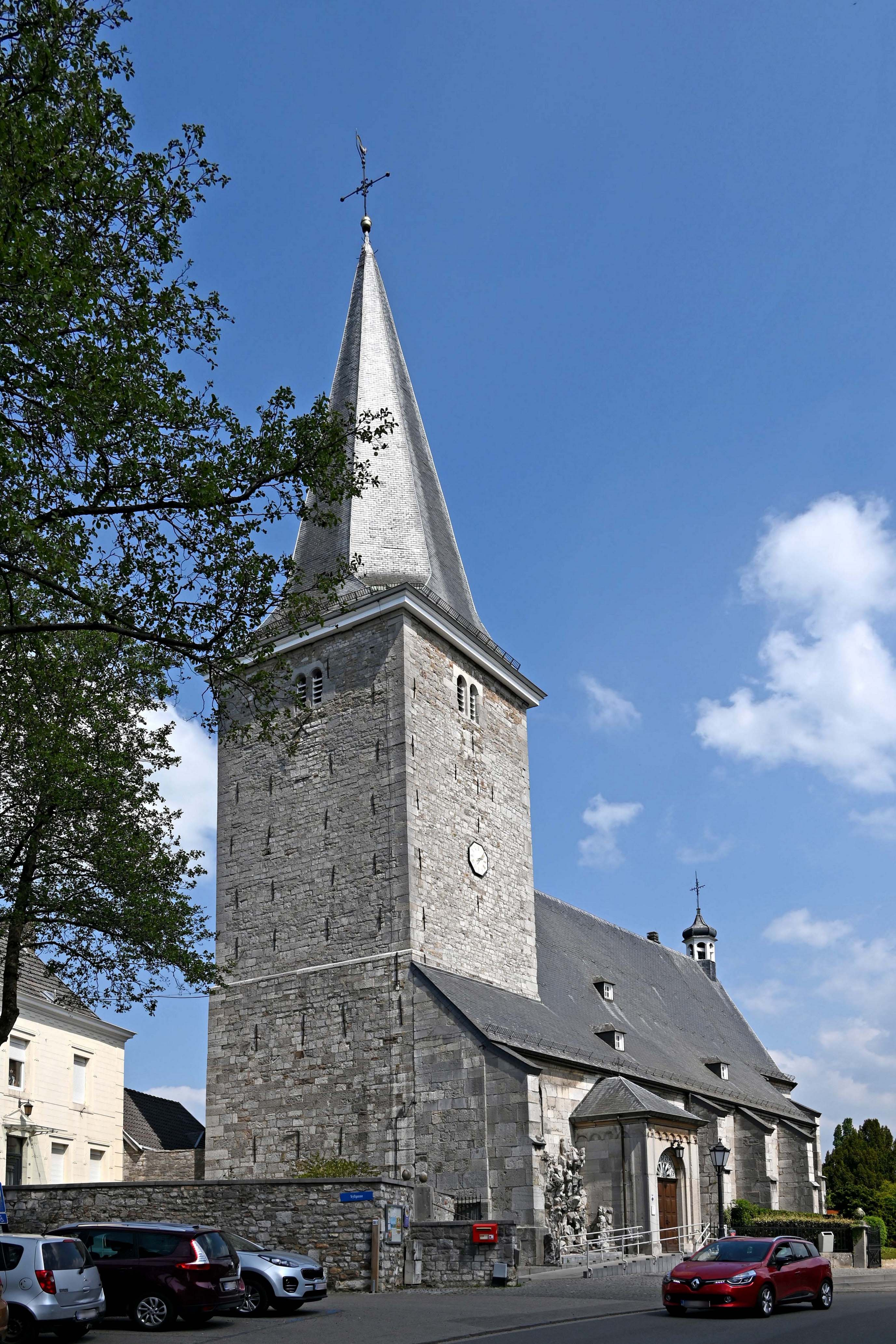
- Church of St. Katharina

- Location in Belgium
- Coordinates: 50°39′N 06°03′E
- Country: Belgium
- Region: Wallonia
- Community: German-speaking Community of Belgium
- Province: Liège
- Arrondissement: Verviers
- Municipality: Eupen

Population
  - Total: 4,000
- Postal codes: 4701
- Area codes: 087

Kettenis is a village in the municipality of Eupen, East Belgium.
