= Herman Baltia =

Belgian military officer

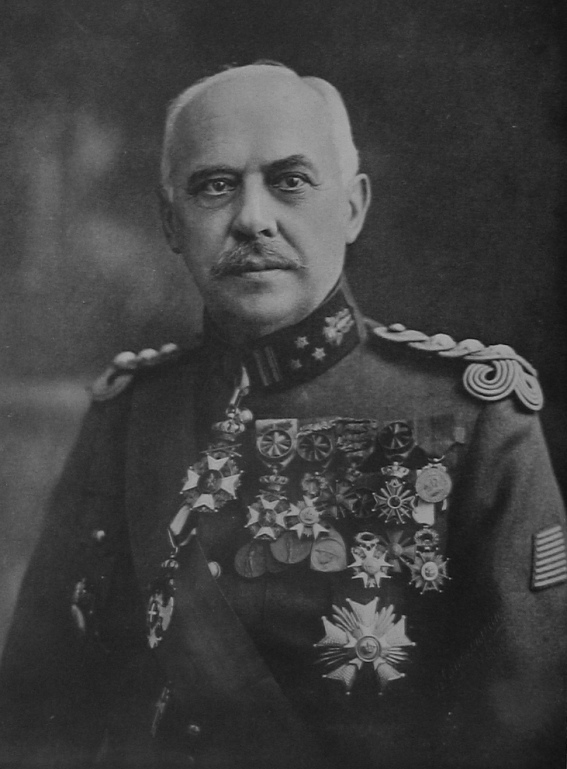
- Baltia, photographed in 1922
- Born: 1 September 1863; Saint-Josse-ten-Noode, Belgium
- Died: 16 September 1938 (aged 75); Saint-Gilles, Belgium
- Occupations: soldier, politician

Baron Herman Baltia (1 September 1863 – 16 September 1938) was a Belgian military officer, the son of the Belgian General Charles Baltia (of Luxembourgish origin) and of a German mother.

== Career ==
In 1907 Baltia was made an officer in the army's cartographic institute, charged with preparing a mission for setting the southern boundaries of the Belgian Congo, although he did not get to begin this task. In 1908 he was promoted to Major. He became a member of the general staff in 1910.

A watercolour painter, he organised several exhibitions on the Yser Front starting in 1916, even displaying some of his own works during the first exhibition. He did this while serving as commander of the 10th Ligne Regiment (the future Chasseurs Ardennais). Baltia received high military honours and was made a Major General in December 1916, having served with distinction in the vicinity of Yser and Ypres and in North France.

From 10 January 1920 (when the Treaty of Versailles entered into force) to 1 June 1925 (in accordance with the law of 6 March 1925), Baltia, promoted to Lieutenant General on 26 March 1920, exercised the function of Royal High Commissioner of Eupen-Malmedy, responsible solely before the Prime Minister. He obtained this post in particular due to his command of French as well as German but also, according to his detractors, due to his colonial experience, which would prove useful in a territory annexed by Belgium against its inhabitants' will.

One of Baltia's first official acts was to have taken down the monument commemorating the Franco-Prussian War of 1870-1871 located in the town of Malmedy, where he had an official residence. After quickly fulfilling the high expectations on him, he was awarded the title of Baron by royal decree on 28 August 1920.

Between 26 January and 23 July 1920, he organised a popular consultation of the type required by the Treaty of Versailles. In this vote, the opponents of annexation had to write their names and addresses in an ad hoc register. Supporters had to do nothing. Only 271 of 33,726 voters dared to do this.

== Honours and arms ==
Coat of arms of Herman Baltia
Description Party per bend sinister vert and sable, a bend sinister wave or, three swords argent, hilt and pommel or, point downwards, arranged per bend. Coronet Belgian Baron's coronet Crest A dexter arm holding a sword of the shield. Supporters deux hommes d’armes à la figure de carnation le corps couvert d’une armure et la tête d’un armet d’argent, s’appuyant sur une épée d’argent garnie d’or. Motto ET BELLO ET PACE PATRIAE MILES.

== Bibliography ==
- Eupen, Malmedy et Son Gouverneur (1923)
- O'Connell, Vincent (2013). ""Left to Their Own Devices". Belgium's Ambiguous Assimilation of Eupen-Malmedy (1919–1940)" (PDF). Journal of Belgian History. 43 (4): 10–45.
