= Émile Coulonvaux =

Belgian lawyer and politician

- Born: Émile Maurice Léon Coulonvaux; 26 February 1892; Chimay, Belgium
- Died: 10 March 1966 (aged 74); Dinant, Belgium
- Occupations: politician, lawyer

Émile Maurice Léon Coulonvaux (French pronunciation: [emil kulɔ̃vo]; 26 February 1892 – 10 March 1966) was a Belgian liberal lawyer and politician. Coulonvaux was doctor in law and a lawyer. He became an alderman (1927–1928) in Dinant and was also liberal senator (1939–1946 and 1949–1961) and President of the Liberal Party in 1937–1940.

== Sources ==
- Presidents of the Belgian liberal party
