= Walhorn =

Village in Lontzen, Belgium

Coordinates: 50.67461°N 6.045581°E

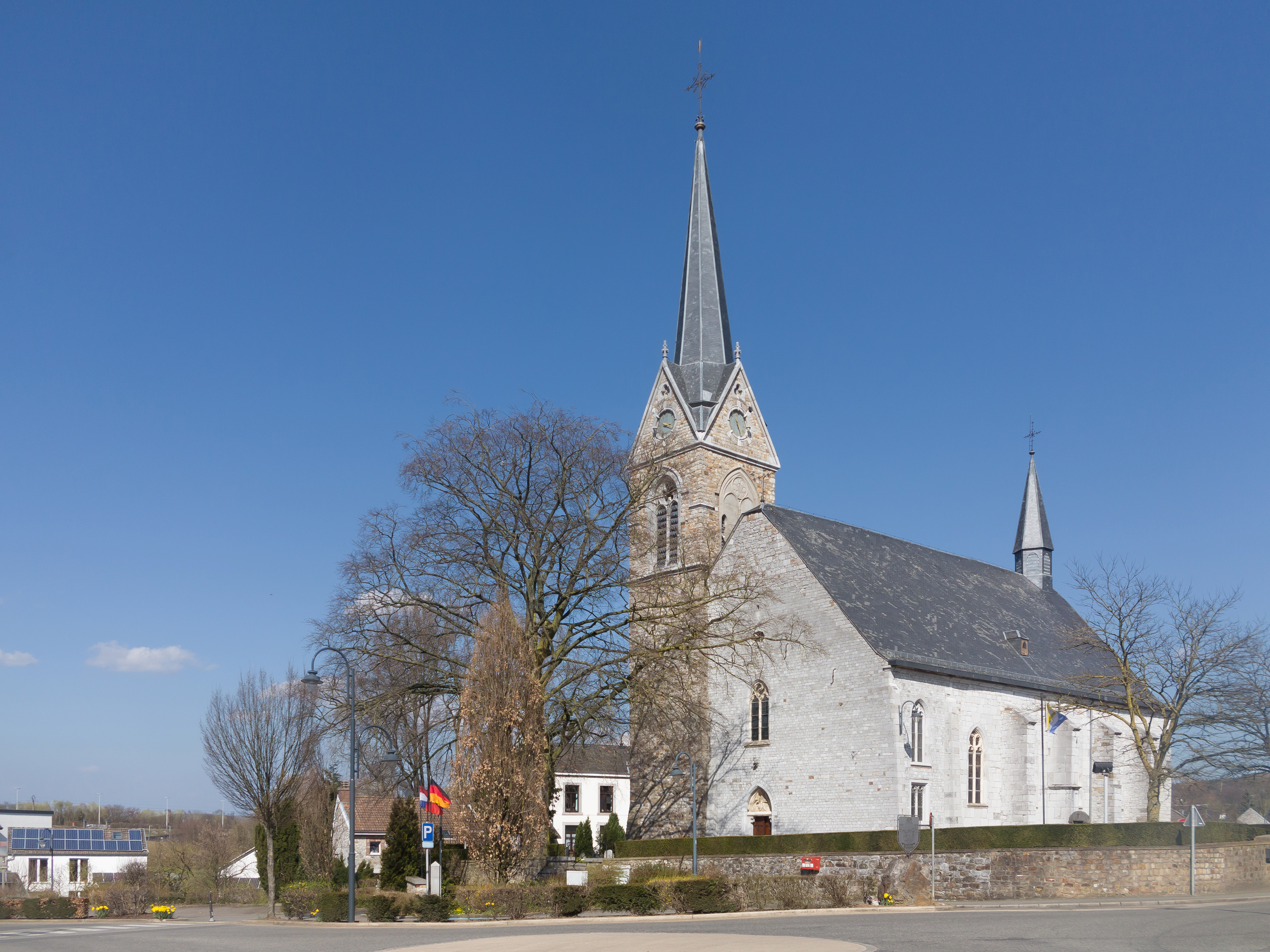
Church: die Walhorner Pfarrkirche

Walhorn (German pronunciation: [ˈvalˌhɔʁn]) is a village in the municipality of Lontzen, East Belgium.

The HSL 3 passes immediately next to Walhorn.
