= Cantons of Belgium =

Subdivisions for judicial and electoral purposes

In Belgium, there are judicial and electoral cantons.

== Judicial cantons ==
A judicial canton (Dutch: gerechtelijk kanton, French: canton judiciaire, German: gerichtlicher Kanton) is a group of municipalities over which a single justice of the peace has jurisdiction. A judicial arrondissement consists of all judicial cantons on its territory. There are 187 judicial cantons in Belgium as of 2017. Most judicial cantons cover multiple municipalities; however larger towns and cities are often divided into more than one judicial canton. The city of Antwerp, for instance, is divided into 12 judicial cantons. A judicial canton has an average population of 60,000 people, but some have a population as low as 30,000 people or as high as 100,000 people.

== Electoral cantons ==
An electoral canton (Dutch: kieskanton, French: canton électoral) is a group of municipalities in which elections are organised together by one Canton Principal Office. It does not necessarily correspond with a judicial canton. Each electoral canton consists of one or more whole municipalities, and each canton is wholly within a single administrative arrondissement.

There are 209 electoral cantons in Belgium, of which 8 are in Brussels, 104 are in Flanders, and 97 are in Wallonia. The newest canton is Sint-Genesius-Rode in Flemish Brabant, which was created in 2014. The cantons were the lowest, most detailed level at which election results were available, until the 2014 elections when the FPS Interior also published results at municipality level.

=== Brussels ===
- Anderlecht
- Brussels
- Ixelles/Elsene
- Molenbeek-Saint-Jean/Sint-Jans-Molenbeek
- Saint-Gilles/Sint-Gillis
- Saint-Josse-ten-Noode/Sint-Joost-ten-Node
- Schaerbeek/Schaarbeek
- Uccle/Ukkel

=== Flanders ===
==== Antwerp ====
- Antwerp
- Arendonk
- Boom
- Brecht
- Duffel
- Heist-op-den-Berg
- Herentals
- Hoogstraten
- Kapellen
- Kontich
- Lier
- Mechelen
- Mol
- Puurs
- Turnhout
- Westerlo
- Zandhoven

==== East Flanders ====
- Aalst
- Assenede
- Beveren-Waas
- Brakel
- Deinze
- Dendermonde
- Destelbergen
- Eeklo
- Evergem
- Ghent
- Geraardsbergen
- Hamme
- Herzele
- Horebeke
- Kaprijke
- Kruishoutem
- Lochristi
- Lokeren
- Merelbeke
- Nazareth
- Nevele
- Ninove
- Oudenaarde
- Ronse
- Sint-Gillis-Waas
- Sint-Niklaas
- Temse
- Waarschoot
- Wetteren
- Zele
- Zomergem
- Zottegem

==== Flemish Brabant ====
- Aarschot
- Asse
- Diest
- Glabbeek
- Haacht
- Halle
- Landen
- Lennik
- Leuven
- Meise
- Sint-Genesius-Rode
- Tienen
- Vilvoorde
- Zaventem
- Zoutleeuw

==== Limburg ====
- Beringen
- Bilzen
- Borgloon
- Bree
- Genk
- Hasselt
- Herk-de-Stad
- Maaseik
- Maasmechelen
- Neerpelt
- Peer
- Riemst
- Sint-Truiden
- Tongeren
- Voeren

==== West Flanders ====
- Avelgem
- Bruges
- Diksmuide
- Gistel
- Harelbeke
- Hooglede
- Ypres
- Izegem
- Kortrijk
- Lichtervelde
- Menen
- Mesen
- Meulebeke
- Nieuwpoort
- Ostend
- Oostrozebeke
- Poperinge
- Roeselare
- Ruiselede
- Tielt
- Torhout
- Veurne
- Vleteren
- Wervik
- Zonnebeke

=== Wallonia ===
==== Hainaut ====
- Antoing
- Ath
- Beaumont
- Belœil
- Binche
- Boussu
- Celles
- Charleroi
- Chimay
- Chièvres
- Châtelet
- Comines-Warneton
- Dour
- Enghien
- Estaimpuis
- Flobecq
- Fontaine-l'Évêque
- Frameries
- Frasnes-lez-Anvaing
- La Louvière
- Le Rœulx
- Lens
- Lessines
- Leuze-en-Hainaut
- Merbes-le-Château
- Mons
- Mouscron
- Péruwelz
- Seneffe
- Soignies
- Thuin
- Tournai

==== Liège ====
- Aubel
- Aywaille
- Bassenge
- Dison
- Eupen
- Ferrières
- Fléron
- Grâce-Hollogne
- Hannut
- Herstal
- Herve
- Huy
- Héron
- Limbourg
- Liège
- Malmedy
- Nandrin
- Saint-Nicolas
- St. Vith
- Seraing
- Spa
- Stavelot
- Verlaine
- Verviers
- Visé
- Waremme

==== Luxembourg ====
- Arlon
- Bastogne
- Bouillon
- Durbuy
- Érezée
- Fauvillers
- Florenville
- Houffalize
- La Roche-en-Ardenne
- Marche-en-Famenne
- Messancy
- Nassogne
- Neufchâteau
- Paliseul
- Saint-Hubert
- Sainte-Ode
- Vielsalm
- Virton
- Wellin
- Étalle

==== Namur ====
- Andenne
- Beauraing
- Ciney
- Couvin
- Dinant
- Éghezée
- Florennes
- Fosses-la-Ville
- Gedinne
- Gembloux
- Namur
- Philippeville
- Rochefort
- Walcourt

==== Walloon Brabant ====
- Genappe
- Jodoigne
- Nivelles
- Perwez
- Wavre
