= Lontzen =

Municipality in Liège province, Belgium

- Municipality
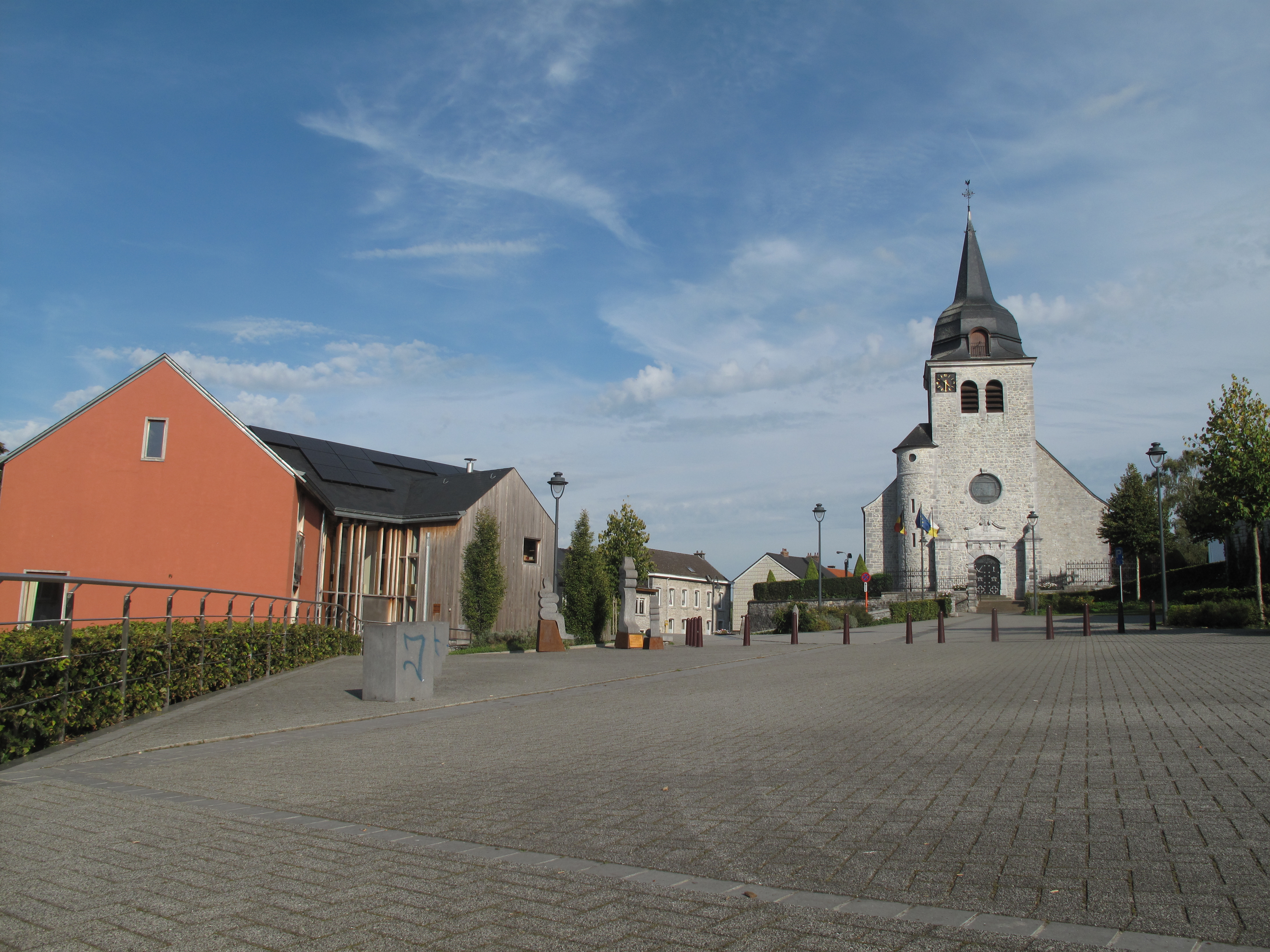

- Flag Coat of arms

- Location of Lontzen in the province of Liège
- Interactive map of Lontzen
- Location in Belgium
- Coordinates: 50°41′N 06°00′E
- Country: Belgium
- Community: German-speaking Community of Belgium
- Region: Wallonia
- Province: Liège
- Arrondissement: Verviers

Government
  - Mayor: Patrick Thevissen (PFF, Energie)
  - Governing parties: Energie, Ecolo

Area
  - Total: 28.71 km^{2} (11.08 sq mi)

Population (2018-01-01)
  - Total: 5,695
  - Density: 198.4/km^{2} (513.8/sq mi)
- Postal codes: 4710-4711
- NIS code: 63048
- Area codes: 087
- Website: www.lontzen.be

Lontzen (German pronunciation: [ˈlɔntsn̩]) is a municipality located in East Belgium. On January 1, 2018 Lontzen had a total population of 5,695. The total area is 28.73 km^{2} which gives a population density of 198 inhabitants per km^{2}.

The municipality consists of the following sub-municipalities: Lontzen proper, Herbesthal, and Walhorn.

In the 19th century, a Low Franconian dialect was widely spoken in Lontzen.

== See also ==
- List of protected heritage sites in Lontzen
