= Eupen =

Capital of the German-speaking Community of Belgium

- Municipality
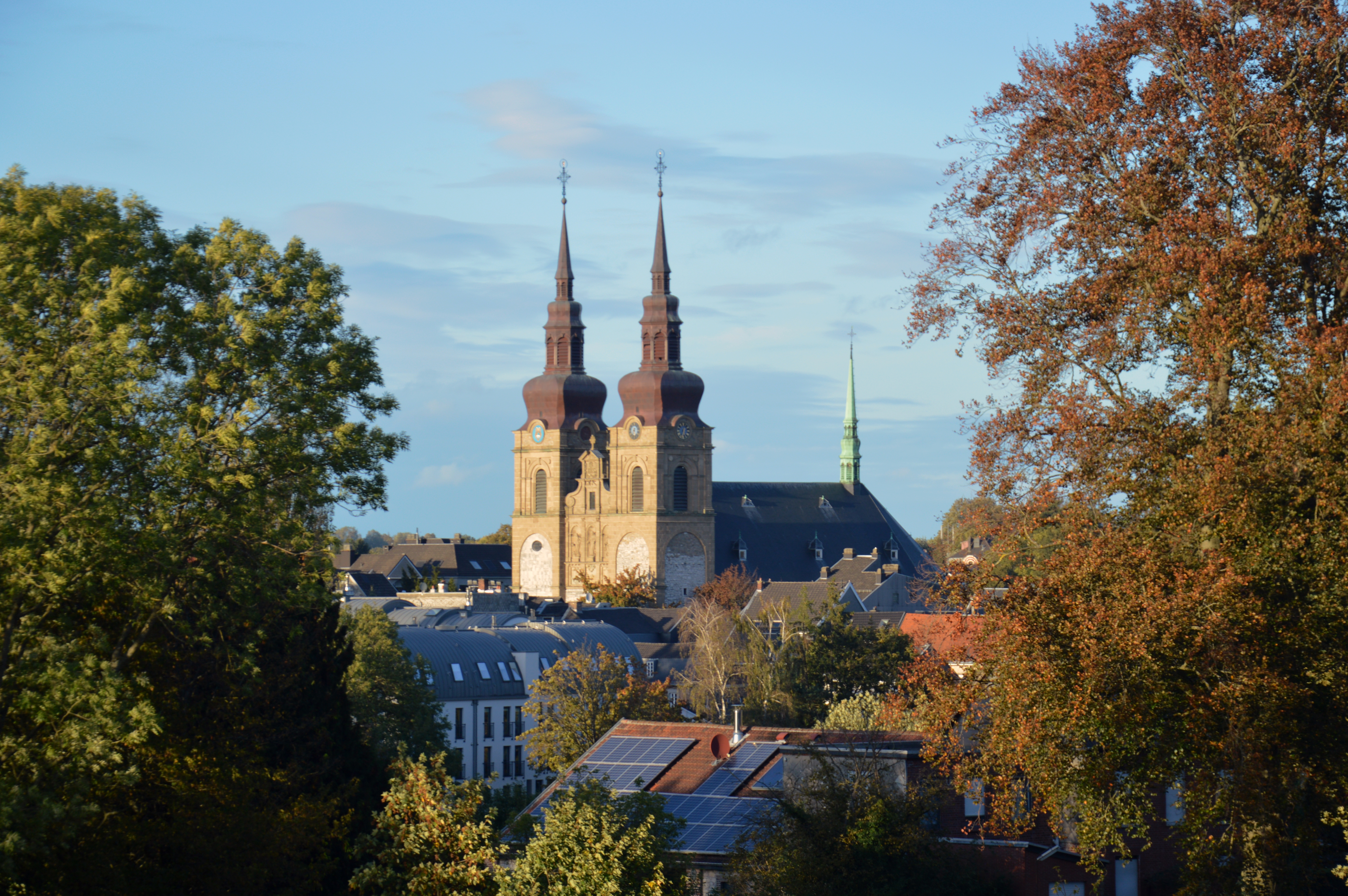
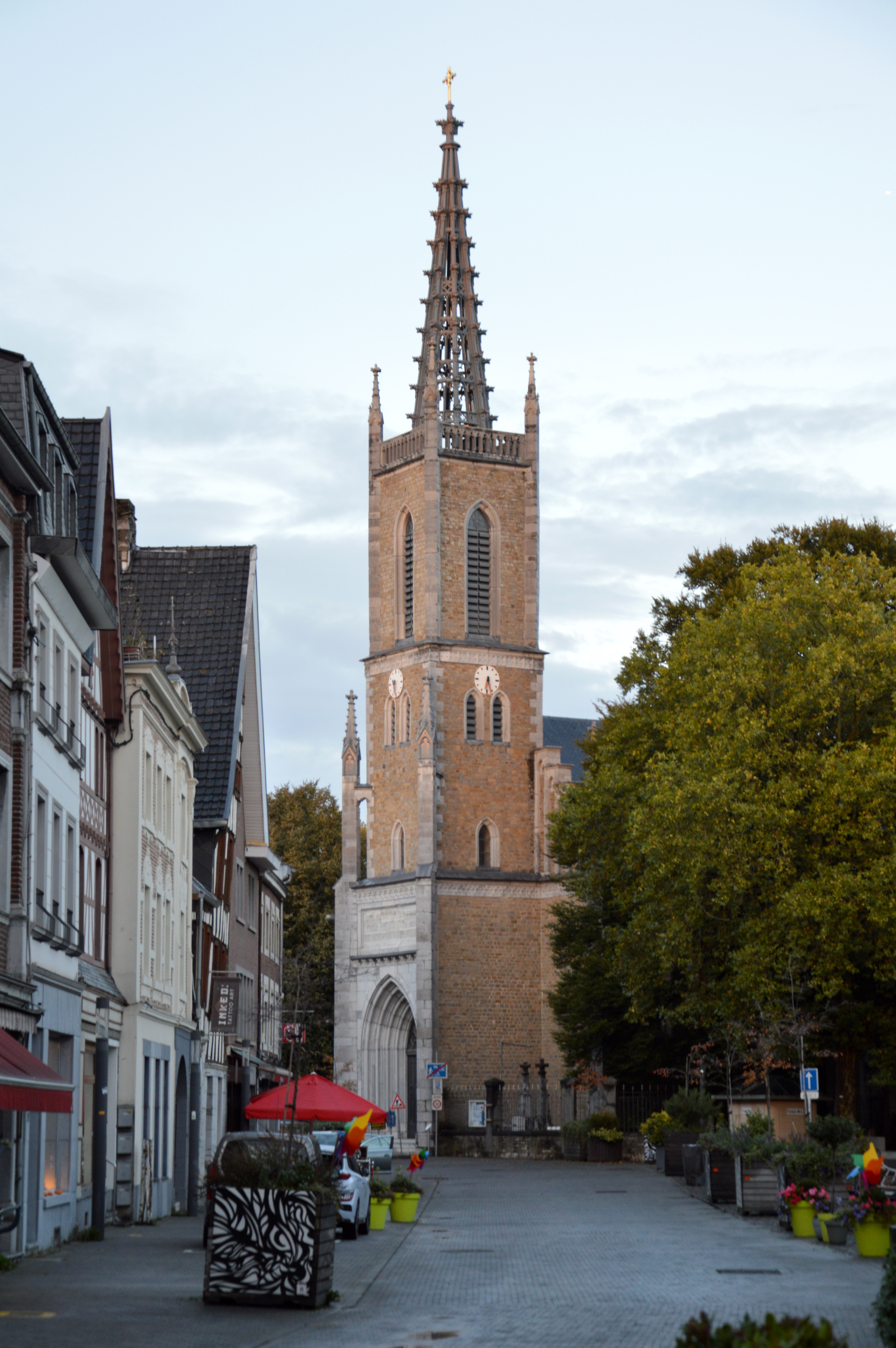
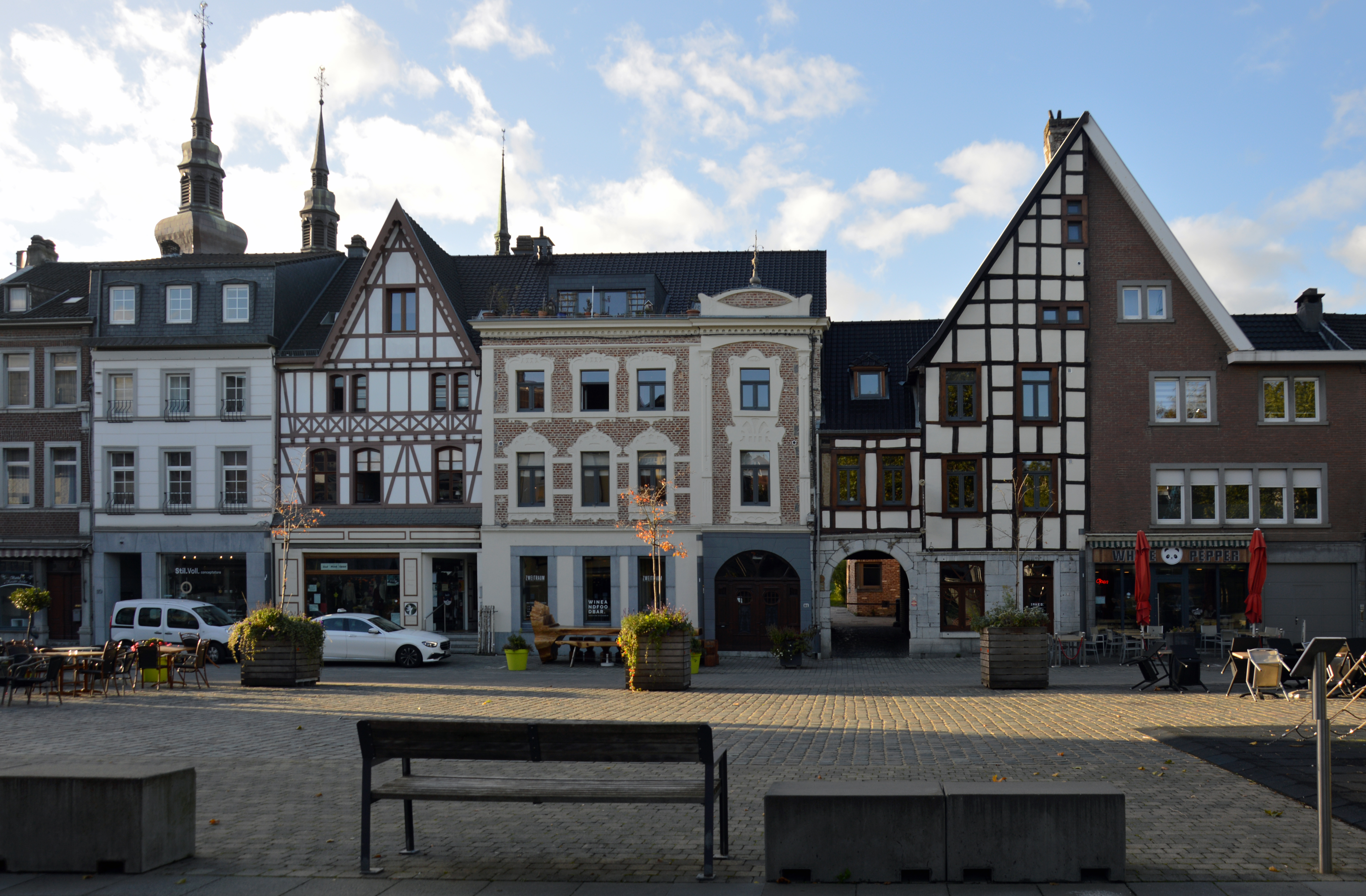
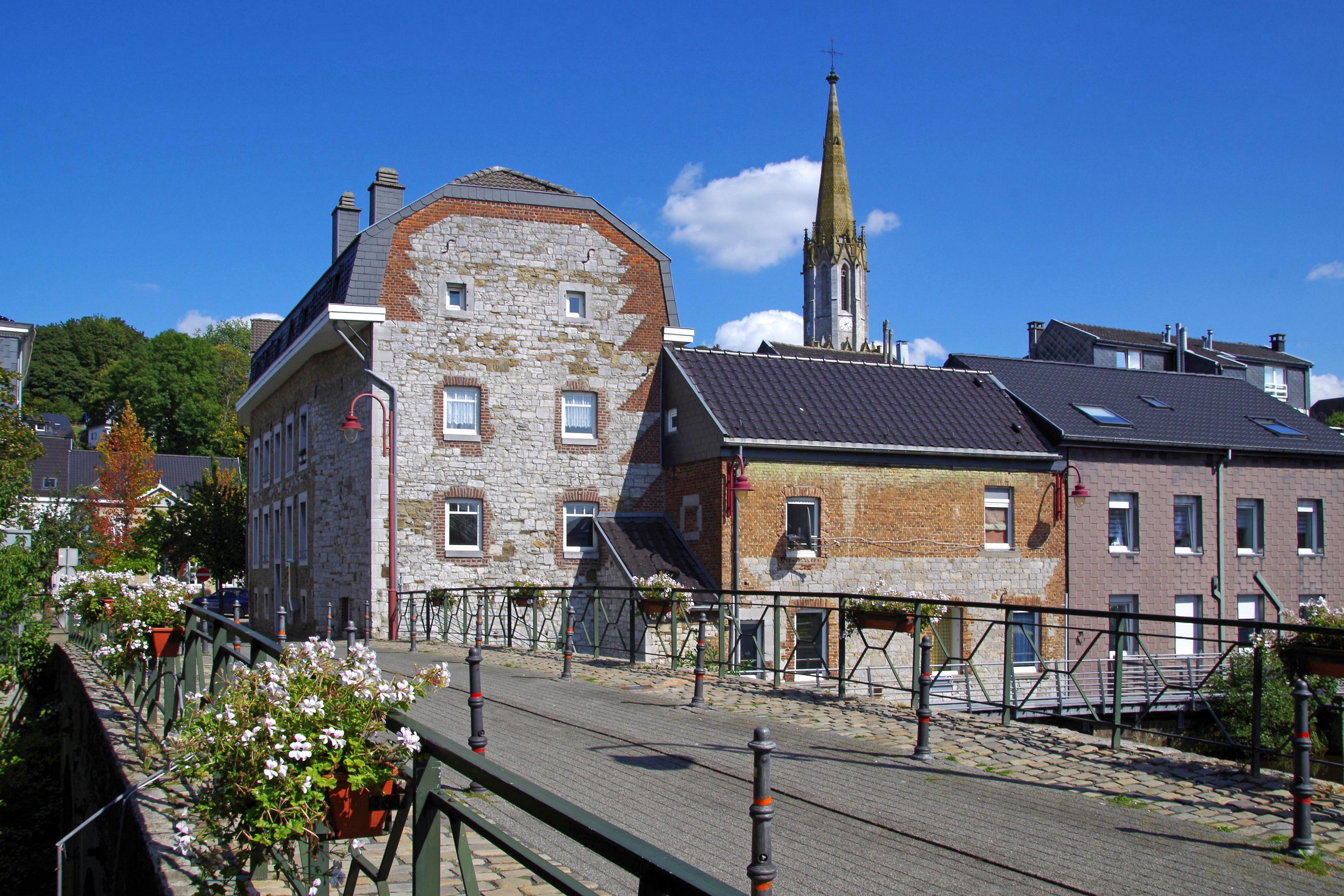
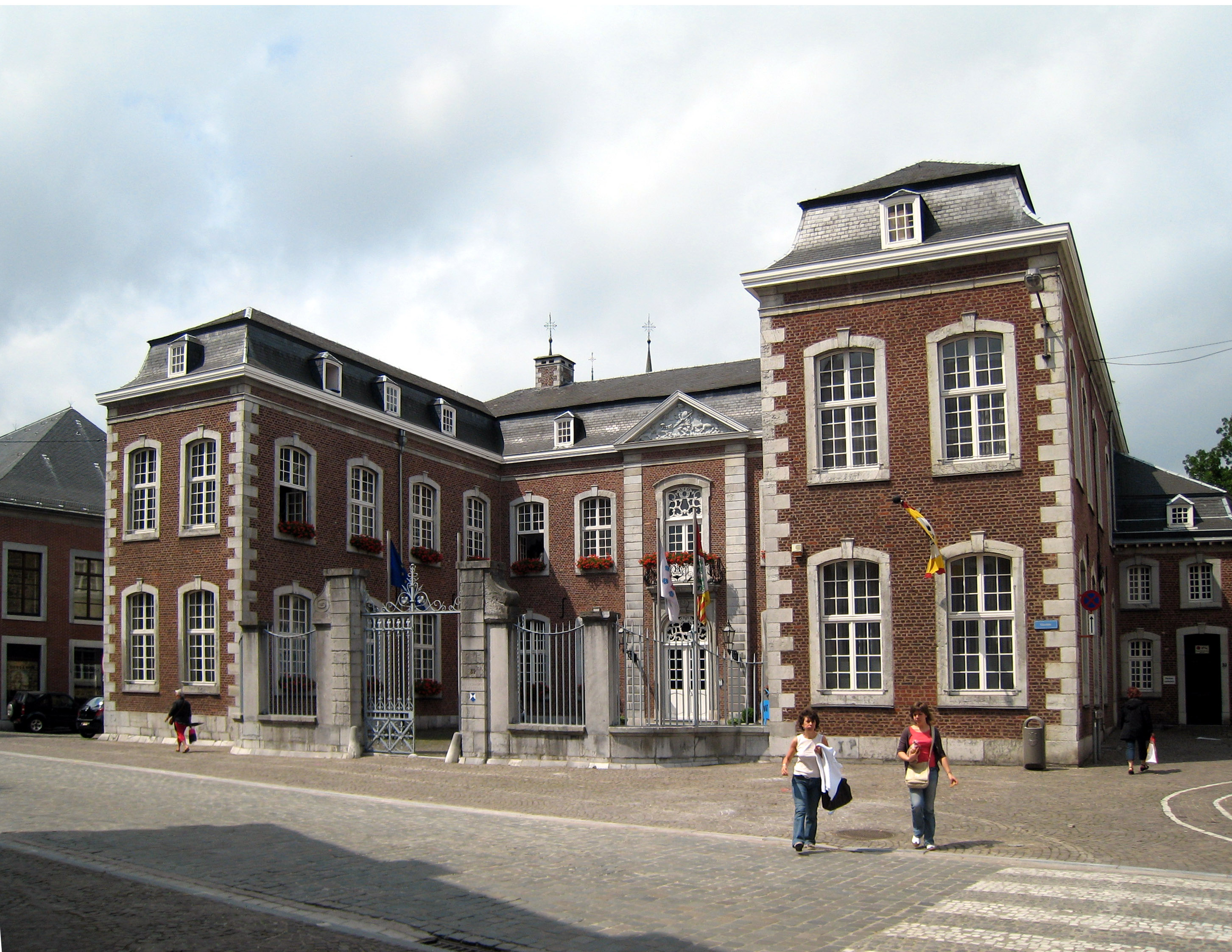
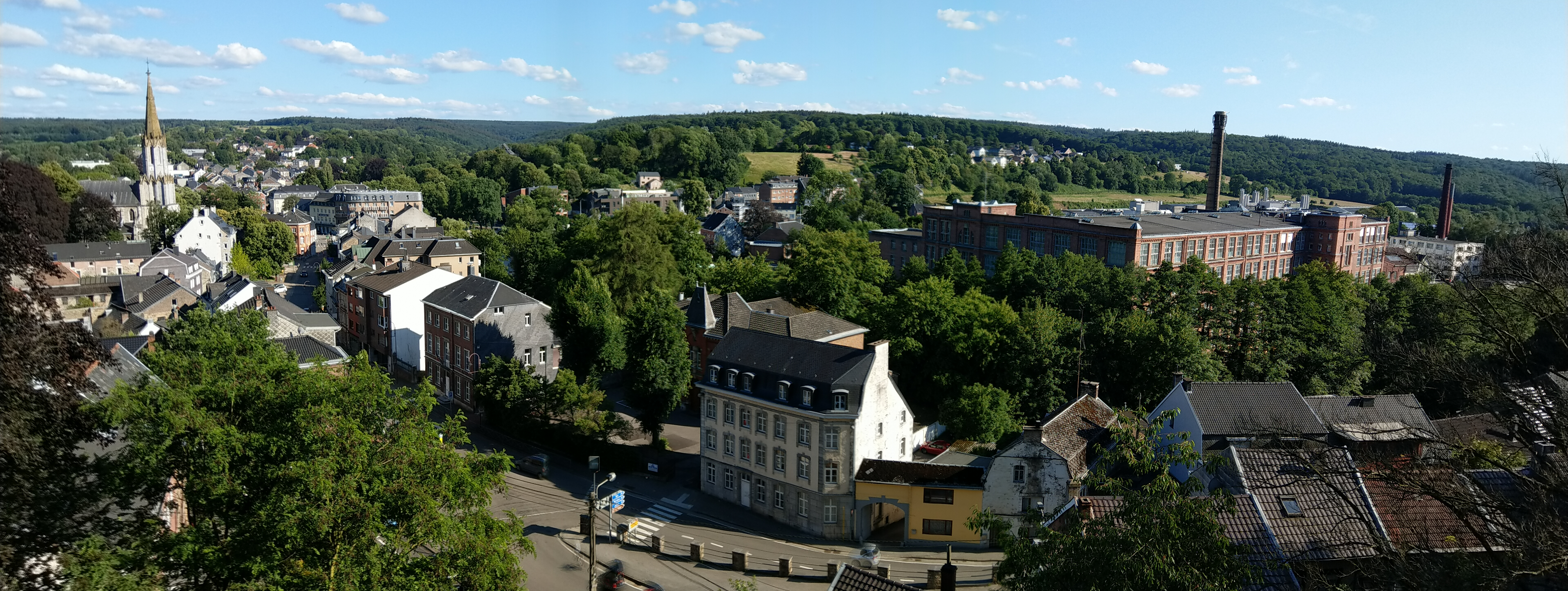
- City Parish Church of Saint Nicholas Friedenskirche Klötzerbahn street Malmedyerstraße Haus Grand Ry View of Eupen from Moorenhöhe

- Flag Coat of arms

- Location of Eupen in the province of Liège
- Interactive map of Eupen
- Location in Belgium
- Coordinates: 50°38′N 06°02′E
- Country: Belgium
- Community: German-speaking Community of Belgium
- Region: Wallonia
- Province: Liège
- Arrondissement: Verviers

Government
  - Mayor: Thomas Lennertz CSP
  - Governing parties: CSP, PFF, ProDG (Belgium)

Area
  - Total: 96 km^{2} (37 sq mi)

Population (2018-01-01)
  - Total: 19,526
  - Density: 200/km^{2} (530/sq mi)
- Postal codes: 4700, 4701
- NIS code: 63023
- Area codes: 087
- Website: www.eupen.be

Eupen (German: [ˈɔʏpn̩], French: [øpɛn], Dutch: [ˈøːpə(n)]; Ripuarian: Ööpe [ˈøːpə]; Walloon: Neyåw [nɛjɑːw]; former French: Néau [neo]) is the capital of the German-speaking Community of Belgium and is a city and municipality in the Belgian province of Liège, 15 kilometres (9 miles) from the German border (Aachen), from the Dutch border (Maastricht) and from the "High Fens" nature reserve (Ardennes). The town is also the capital of the Euroregion Meuse-Rhine.

First mentioned in 1213 as belonging to the Duchy of Limburg, possession of Eupen passed to Brabant, Burgundy, the Holy Roman Empire, and France before being given in 1815 to Prussia, which became part of the new German Empire in 1871. In 1919, after the First World War, the Treaty of Versailles transferred Eupen and the nearby municipality of Malmedy from Germany to Belgium.

German remains the official language in Eupen (also spoken in the form of the Eupen dialect), and the city serves as the capital for Belgium's German-speaking Community. The city has a small university, the Autonome Hochschule Ostbelgien, offering bachelor's degrees in Education and Nursing. In 2010, Eupen's association football team, K.A.S. Eupen, became the first club from the German-speaking Community to play in the Belgian Pro League.

On 1 January 2006, Eupen had a total population of 18,248 (8,892 males and 9,356 females). The total area is 103.74 km^{2} (40.05 sq mi) which gives a population density of 175.90 inhabitants per km^{2}.

== History ==
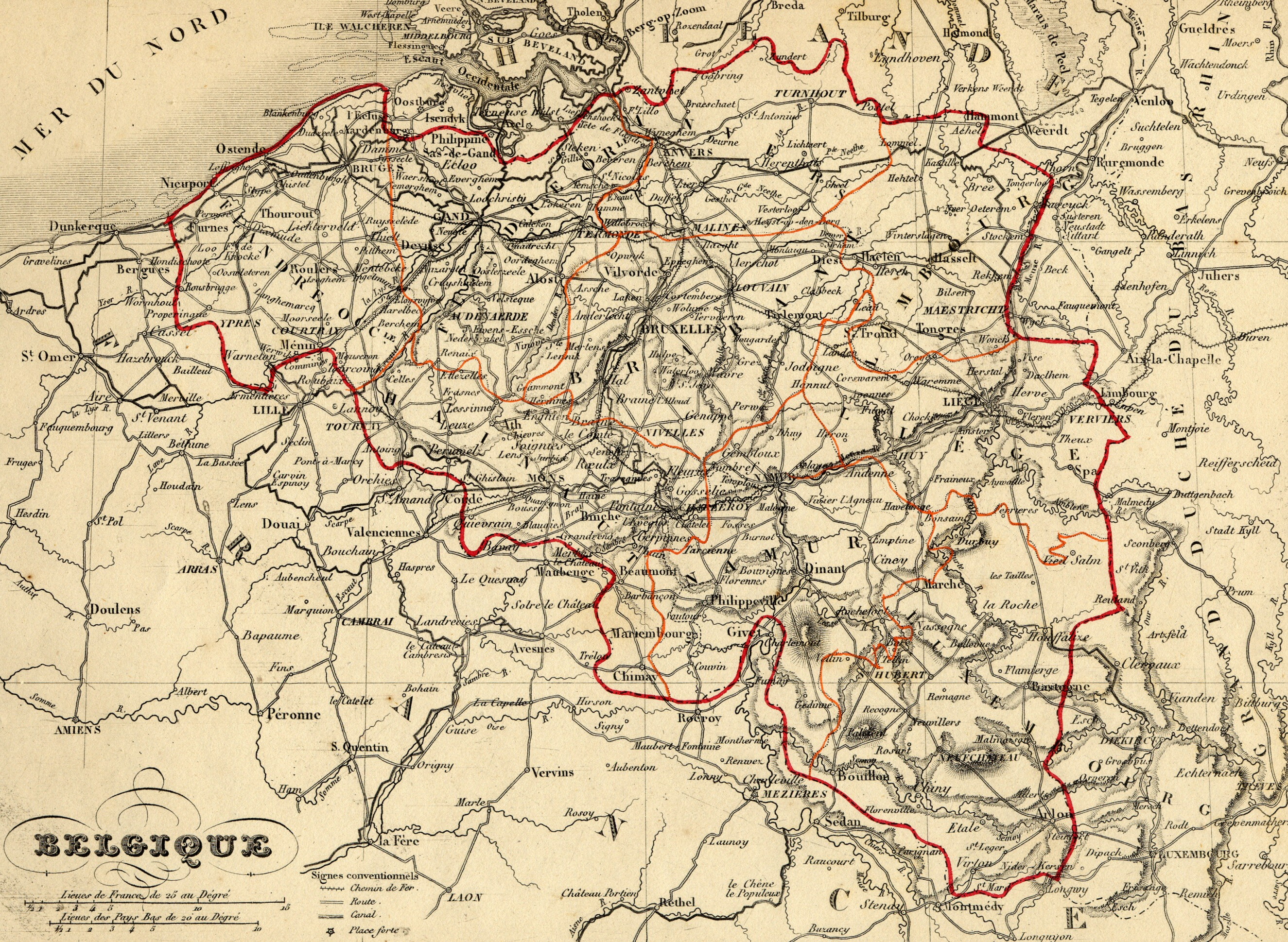
Map of Belgium in 1843: Eupen and the East Cantons were then German.

=== Early history ===
Eupen and the St. Nikolaus Chapel were first mentioned in 1213 as part of the Duchy of Limburg. In 1288, after the Battle of Worringen, the Duchy of Limburg was annexed by John I, Duke of Brabant. Brabant and Limburg were inherited by Burgundy in 1387, and Eupen was burnt to the ground during the war against the Duchy of Guelders. Burgundy was dissolved in 1477 by the Austrian House of Habsburg, who then inherited Eupen after gaining both Limburg and Brabant.

=== Habsburgs and Germans ===
Habsburg Charles V granted Eupen the privilege to conduct two markets per year in 1544. In 1555, both Brabant and Limburg were passed to the Spanish branch of the Habsburgs. Ten years later, Protestantism was mentioned for the first time in the town. In 1582, during the Eighty Years' War against the Spanish Habsburgs, rebels burnt Eupen but did not take control of it. Bubonic plague reached Eupen in 1635, with devastating consequences. Eupen obtained its own court of law in 1648, and in 1674 received city rights, giving it greater recognition and autonomy. Six years later, textile manufacture was introduced to the city.

In 1713, with the Peace of Utrecht, Brabant and Limburg were returned to the Austrian Habsburgs. Revolutionary France took the city in 1794, incorporating it into the Département Ourthe, préfecture Liège and sous-préfecture Malmedy. Following the Congress of Vienna in 1815, Eupen became part of the Prussian Rhine Province. All Prussian possessions became part of the German Empire in 1871, while Eupen itself enjoyed its popularity as a spa town.

Records show that a weaver named 'Schunck' was established as early as 1776. His eldest son, Nikolaus Severin Schunck (1799–1865), had six sons, of whom the third oldest, Arnold, would later found the firm in Heerlen. The youngest son, Joseph, remained at the weaving mill and there is still a weaving mill in Kettenis run by descendants of Nikolaus. The company became the famous Schunck.

=== 20th century ===
After the First World War, the 1919 Treaty of Versailles transferred Eupen and the nearby municipality of Malmedy (Eupen-Malmedy territory) from Germany to Belgium. From 1938 the Vesdre Dam was constructed (completed in 1950), creating Lake Eupen. In 1940, Nazi Germany invaded Belgium; and annexed Eupen and Malmedy. In September 1944, American forces reached Eupen which became a centre of fierce fighting in the Battle of the Bulge.

In 1949, the left tower of the St Nikolaus Church burnt down. The city centre was affected by flooding in 1953. Eupen merged with the municipality of Kettenis in 1976, amidst protest from that town.

In 1980, following a state reform ten years earlier, the German-speaking Community of Belgium was established and Eupen was named as its capital.

== Climate ==
Eupen has a cool oceanic climate with some continental influences due to it being elevated in comparison to most of Belgium. Eupen is also wetter and cloudier than Liège in the valley to the west, as a result of orographic lift due to the elevation change. As a result of this along with frequent winter frosts, Eupen gets a significant snowfall amount by Belgian standards. It also gets 16 ice days on average each year, as in the day staying below 0 °C (32 °F), along with 71 frost days.

Climate data for Eupen (1991–2020 normals)
Month	Jan	Feb	Mar	Apr	May	Jun	Jul	Aug	Sep	Oct	Nov	Dec	Year
Mean daily maximum °C (°F)	3.9 (39.0)	4.8 (40.6)	8.6 (47.5)	13.0 (55.4)	16.8 (62.2)	19.8 (67.6)	21.8 (71.2)	21.5 (70.7)	17.7 (63.9)	13.0 (55.4)	7.9 (46.2)	4.5 (40.1)	12.8 (55.0)
Daily mean °C (°F)	1.4 (34.5)	1.8 (35.2)	4.8 (40.6)	8.2 (46.8)	11.9 (53.4)	14.9 (58.8)	16.9 (62.4)	16.6 (61.9)	13.2 (55.8)	9.5 (49.1)	5.2 (41.4)	2.1 (35.8)	8.9 (48.0)
Mean daily minimum °C (°F)	−1.1 (30.0)	−1.2 (29.8)	0.9 (33.6)	3.4 (38.1)	7.1 (44.8)	10.0 (50.0)	12.1 (53.8)	11.7 (53.1)	8.8 (47.8)	5.9 (42.6)	2.5 (36.5)	−0.2 (31.6)	5.0 (41.0)
Average precipitation mm (inches)	114.2 (4.50)	99.9 (3.93)	94.4 (3.72)	69.1 (2.72)	86.9 (3.42)	98.2 (3.87)	103.6 (4.08)	110.2 (4.34)	98.6 (3.88)	91.4 (3.60)	101.0 (3.98)	128.2 (5.05)	1,195.7 (47.09)
Average precipitation days (≥ 1 mm)	15.0	13.6	13.5	11.0	12.5	12.1	13.0	12.6	11.7	12.9	14.5	16.9	159.3
Mean monthly sunshine hours	53	74	123	173	193	197	205	197	150	107	60	44	1,576
Source: Royal Meteorological Institute

== Culture ==
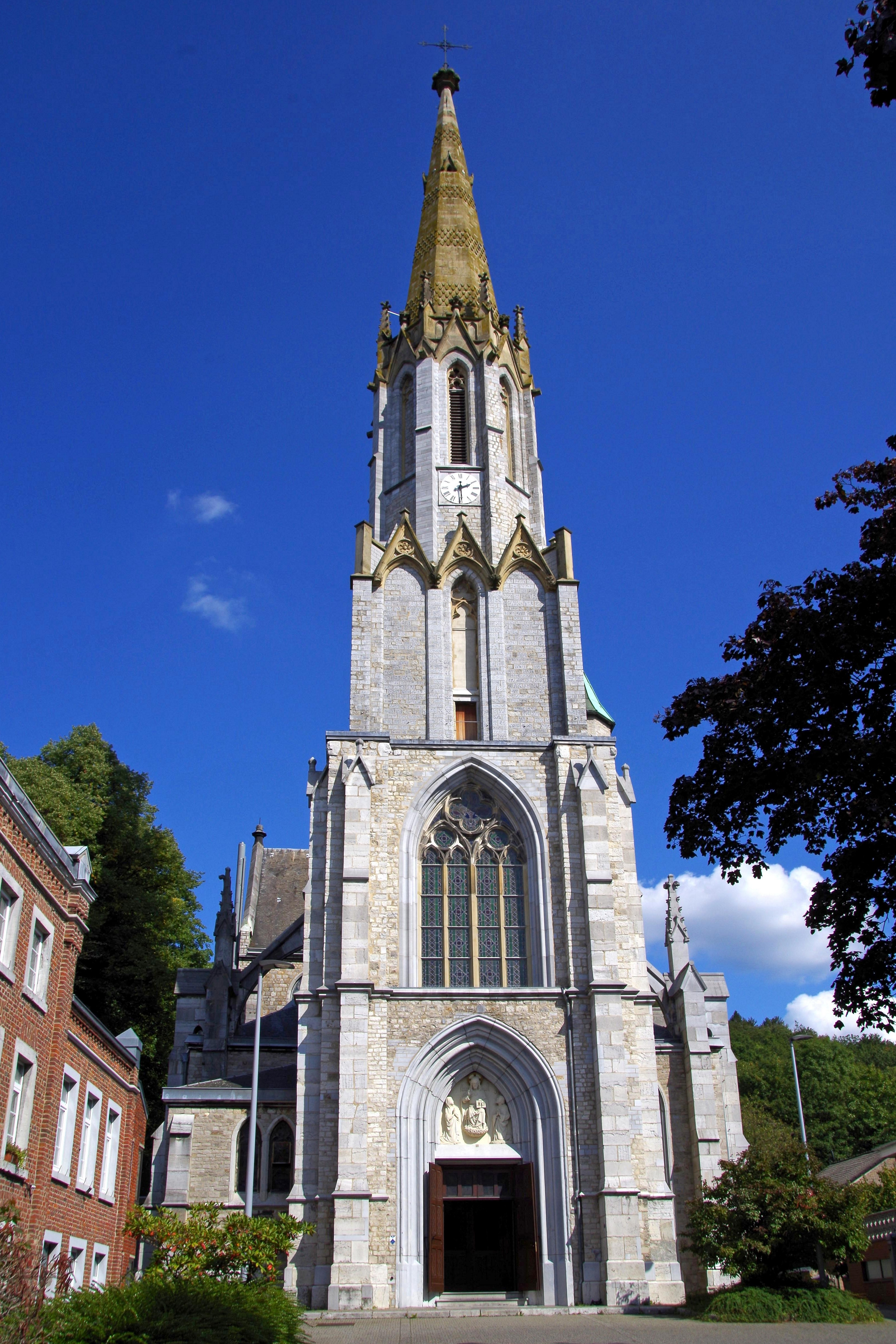
Church of Saint Joseph

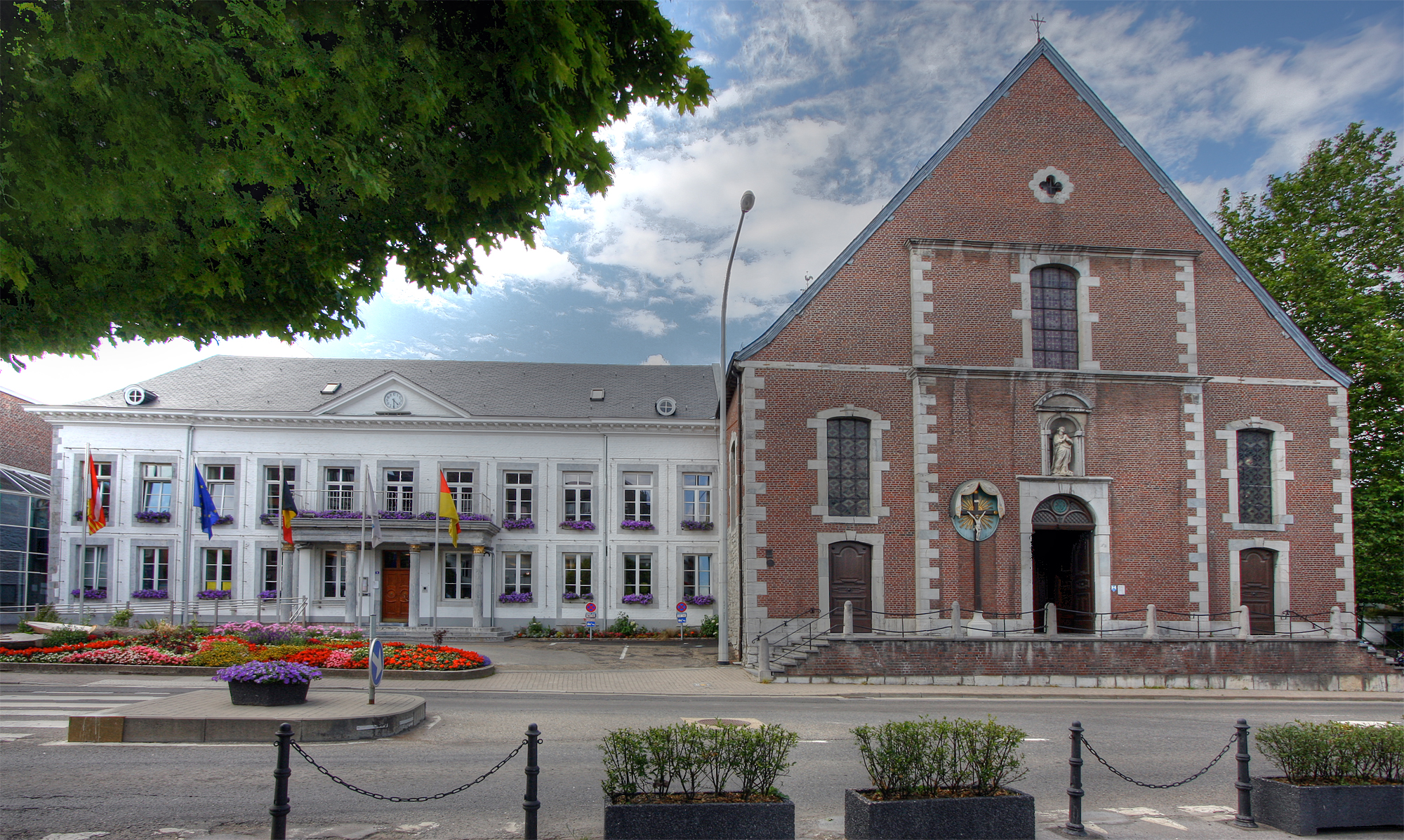
City Hall of Eupen

- Rhenish Carnival occurring around Rosenmontag.
- Municipal Museum, Gospertstrasse
- IKOB: Museum of Contemporary Art
- Permanent exhibition of paintings at the Christian Silvain Foundation
- BRF: Belgischer Rundfunk, is the public-service broadcasting organisation serving the German-speaking Community of Belgium.

== Sport ==
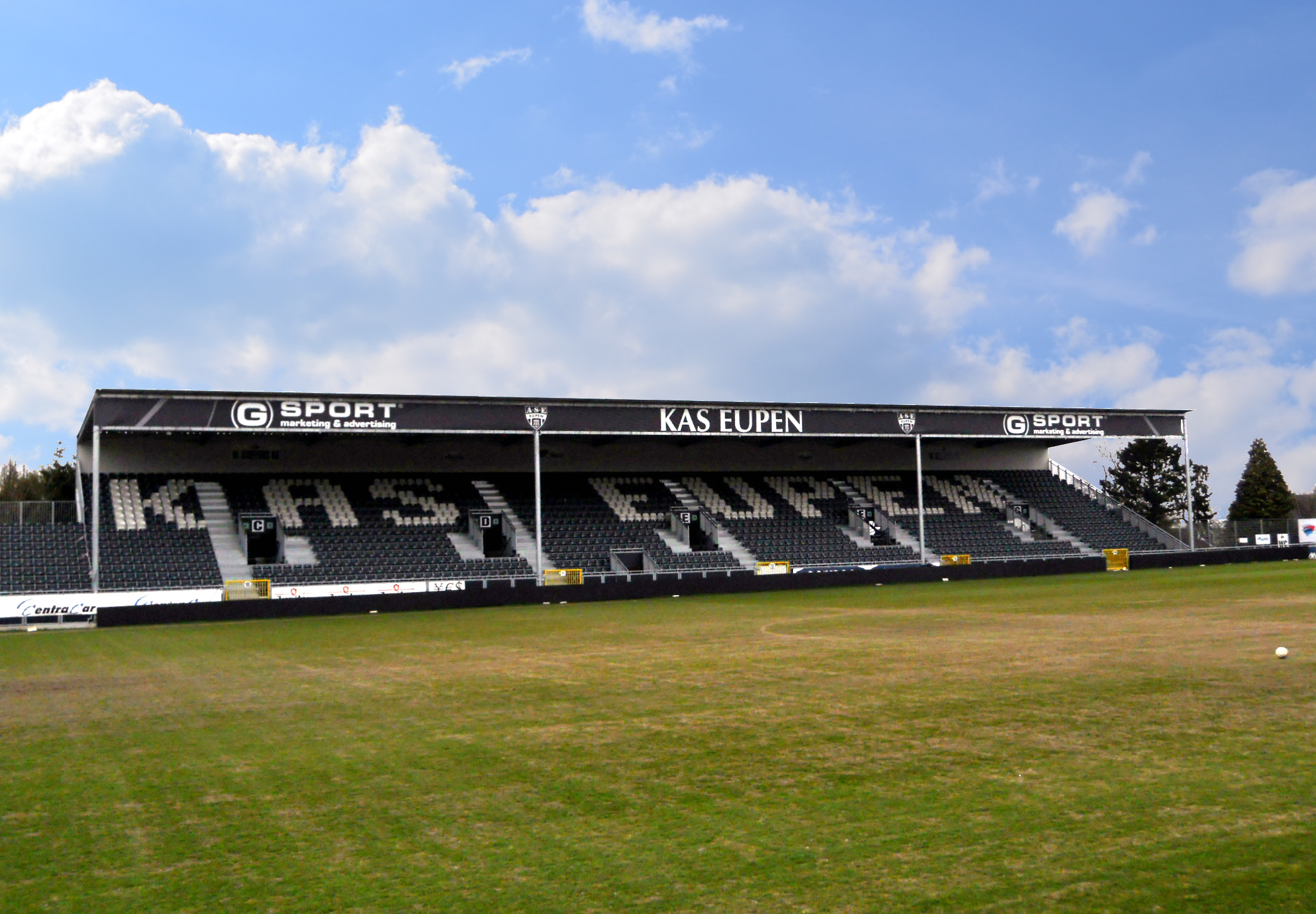
Kehrwegstadion

K.A.S. Eupen, founded in 1945, is the city's main association football club and play at the 8,000-capacity Kehrwegstadion. In 2010, after winning a play-off, the side became the first club from the German-speaking Community to reach the country's top flight, then known as the Belgian Pro League. They were relegated after one season, returning to the top level, now known as the Belgian Pro League, in 2016.

== See also ==
- List of protected heritage sites in Eupen
- Belgian UFO wave
- Oehl
