= List of highest points in Belgium =

A list of highest points in Belgium by province, regions and communities of Belgium.

== Provinces ==
Province	Name	Height (m)	Municipality
Liège	Signal de Botrange	694	Weismes
Luxembourg	Baraque de Fraiture	651	Vielsalm
Namur	Croix-Scaille	504	Gedinne
Hainaut	Unnamed point in Bois des Hauts Marais	365	Chimay
Limburg	Reesberg	287.50	Voeren
Walloon Brabant	Unnamed point in Trou-du-Bois	170	Genappe
West Flanders	Kemmelberg	156	Heuvelland
East Flanders	Hotondberg	150	Kluisbergen
Flemish Brabant	Unnamed point in a golf course	142	Sint-Genesius-Rode
Antwerp	Beerzelberg	51.60	Putte

== Regions ==
Region	Name	Height (m)	Municipality
Walloon Region	Signal de Botrange	694	Weismes
Flemish Region	Reesberg	287.50	Voeren
Brussels-Capital Region	Unnamed point near "Kleine Hut" in Forêt de Soignes	129	Uccle

== Communities ==
Community	Name	Height (m)	Municipality
German-speaking Community	Signal de Botrange	694	Weismes
French Community	Baraque Michel	674	Jalhay
Flemish Community	Reesberg	287.50	Voeren
