= Hill (stream) =

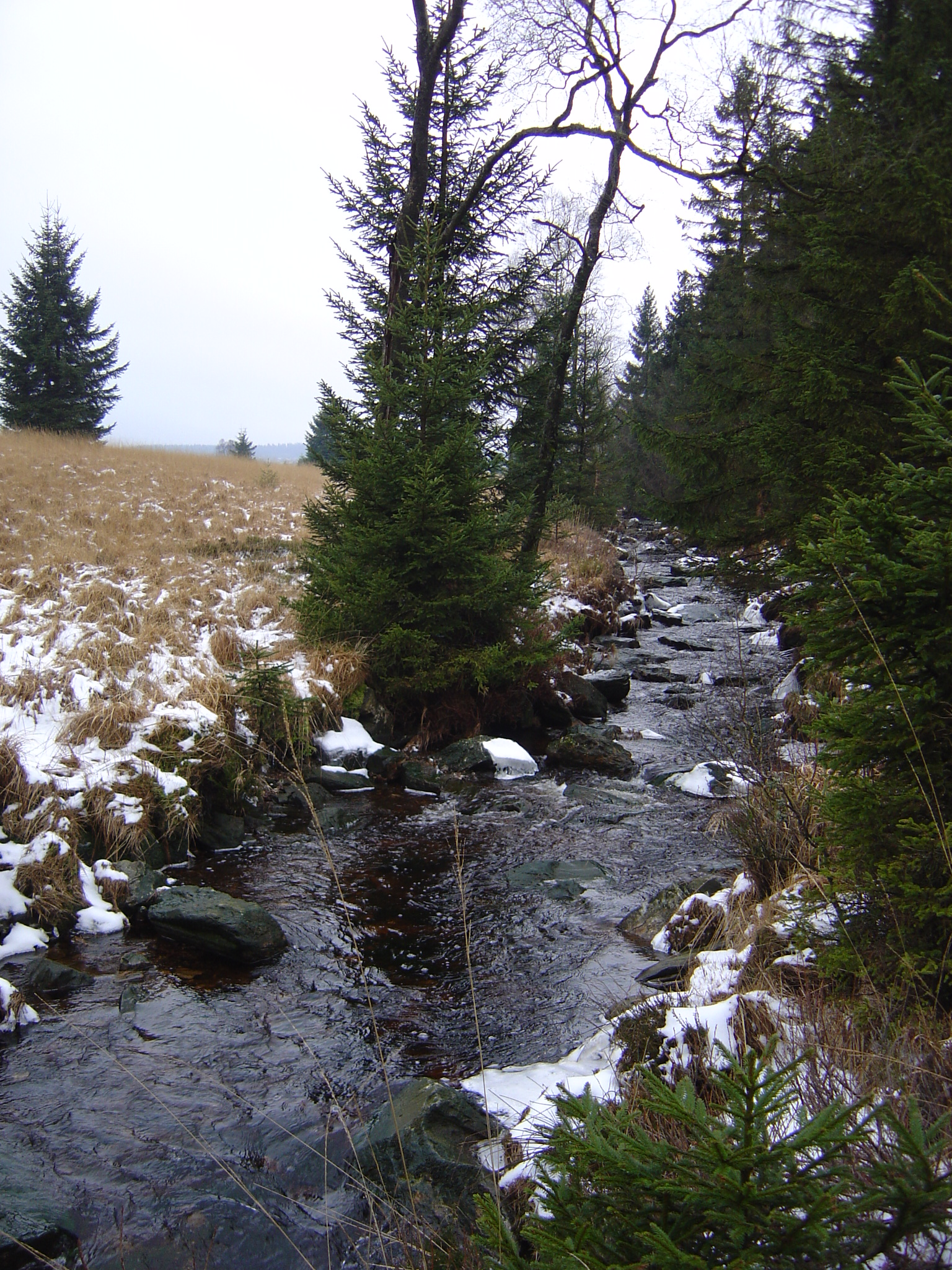
- The Hill in the vicinity of the Signal de Botrange

Location
- Country: Belgium
- Province: Liège

Physical characteristics
- Source
  - location: Near the Signal de Botrange
  - elevation: 660 m
- Mouth
  - location: At Eupen into the Vesdre
  - coordinates: 50°37′18″N 6°02′21″E
  - elevation: 250 m
- Length: 25 km

Basin features
- Progression: Vesdre→ Ourthe→ Meuse→ North Sea

The Hill (French: Helle) is a stream in the High Fens in east Belgium.

== Course ==
The Hill rises near the highest point in Belgium, the Signal de Botrange and empties into the Vesdre (Weser) at Eupen, 25 kilometres further north.

The most important tributaries of the Hill are the Spoorbach and the Soor. The confluence of the Hill and the Spoorbach is located 10 kilometres further downstream near the village of Herzogenhügel. This village is interesting for geological reasons: in a stone quarry there is the only rock of volcanic origin in East Belgium. The Soor discharges into the Hill just before Eupen, at a place called the Black Bridge (Schwarze Brücke).

== The Hill as a state border ==
During the Roman era the river was a boundary between the administrative regions of Tongeren (Civitas Tungrorum) and Cologne (Civitas Agrippinensium).

From the High Middle Ages to 1795 it was the border between the territorial lordships that divided up the region of the High Fens. For example, the border between the Duchy of Limburg and the Duchy of Luxembourg ran here and, further north, in the area of the Herzogenhügel ("Duke(s) Knoll"), between Limburg and the Duchy of Jülich.

From 1815 to 1919 it divided Prussia from the United Kingdom of the Netherlands and its successor state, Belgium.

In 1952 a 1.5-kilometre-long link tunnel was dug between the Hill and the Eupen Weser Reservoir, in order to better regulate the high water demand of the textile industry. For about half its length, the Hill flows through the High Fens-Eifel Nature Park.

== Gallery ==
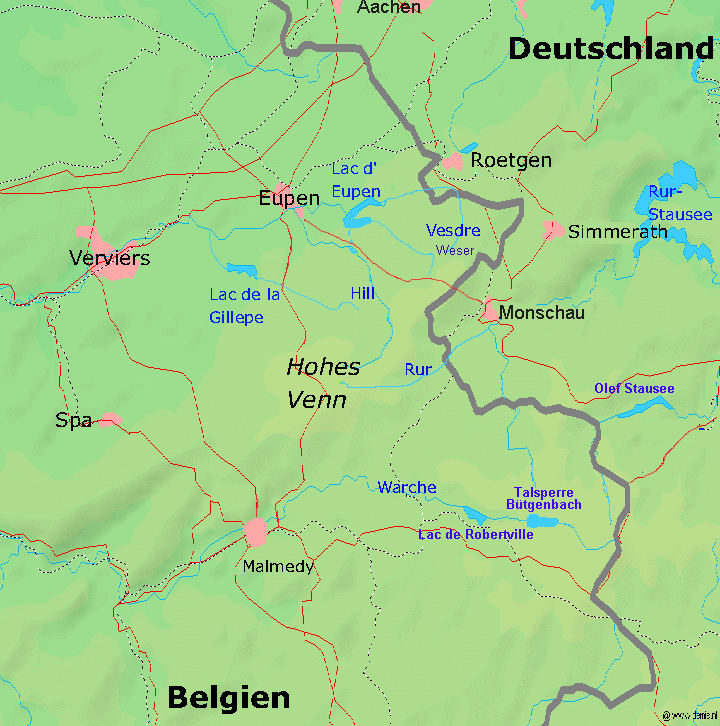
Map of the Hill region

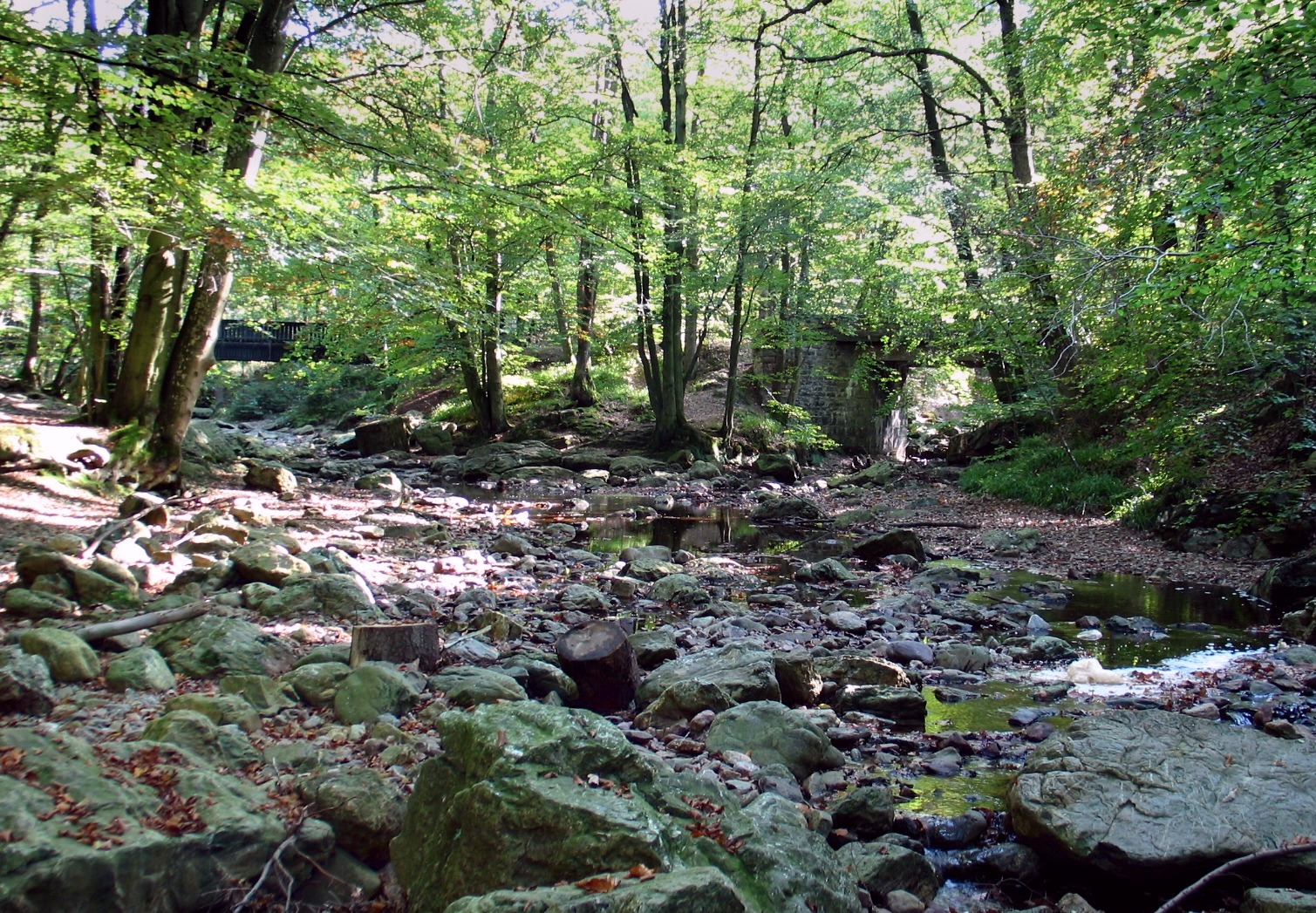
Confluence of the Soor and the Hill

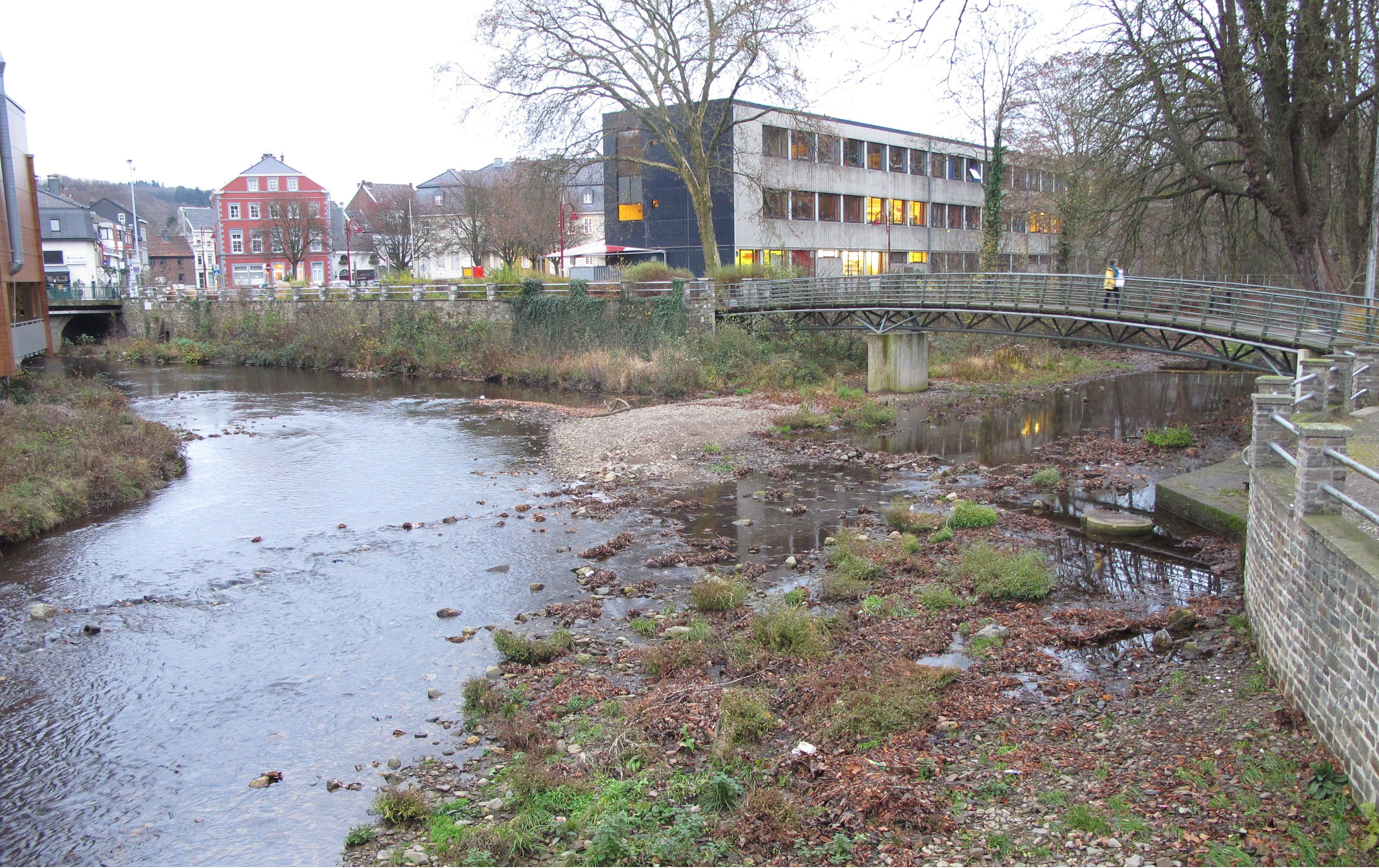
Mouth of the Hill on the Weser
