= Ardennes =

Low mountain range in Belgium, Luxembourg, Germany and France

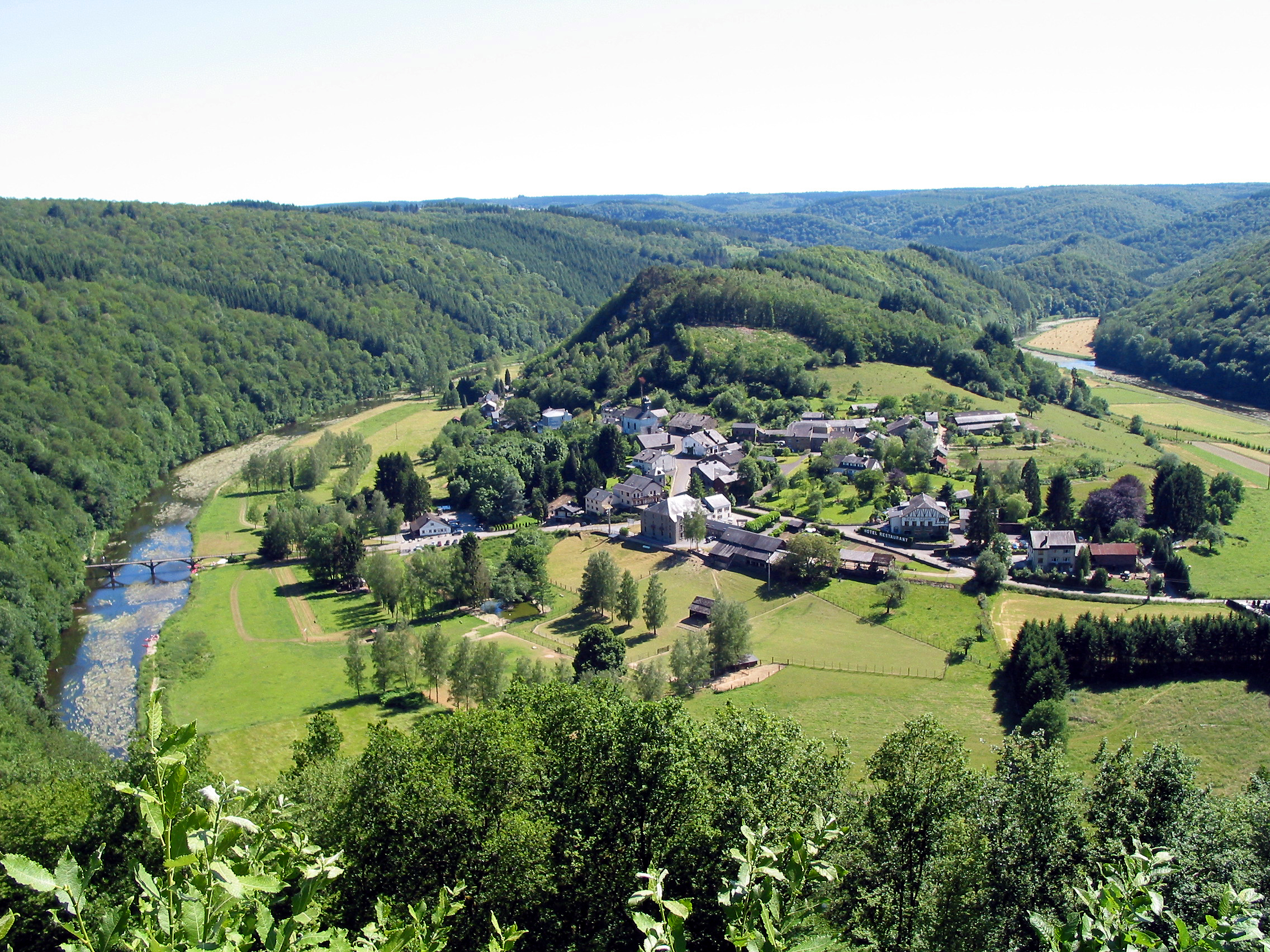
- Landscape of Frahan inside the bend of the Semois
- Interactive map of Ardennes

Geography
- Location: Wallonia, Belgium; Éislek, Luxembourg; Ardennes department and Grand Est region, France; Eifel, Germany
- Coordinates: 50°15′N 5°40′E
- Area: 11,200 square kilometres (4,300 mi^{2})

Administration
- Governing body: Parc National de Champagne/Ardennes; Parc National de Furfooz

The Ardennes, (Note: /ɑːrˈdɛn/ ar-DEN: French: Ardenne [aʁdɛn]; Dutch: Ardennen [ɑrˈdɛnə(n)]; German: Ardennen [aʁˈdɛnən]; Walloon: Årdene [ɑːʀdɛn]; Luxembourgish: Ardennen [ɑʁˈdænən]) also known as the Ardennes Forest or Forest of Ardennes, is a natural region of extensive forests, rough terrain, rolling hills and ridges primarily in Belgium and Luxembourg, extending into Germany and France.

Geologically, the range is a western extension of the Eifel; both were raised during the Givetian age of the Devonian (382.7 to 387.7 million years ago), as were several other named ranges of the same greater range.

The Ardennes proper stretches well into Germany and France (lending its name to the Ardennes department and the former Champagne-Ardenne region) and geologically into the Eifel (the eastern extension of the Ardennes Forest into Bitburg-Prüm, Germany); most of it is in the southeast of Wallonia, the southern and more rural part of Belgium (away from the coastal plain but encompassing more than half of the country's total area). The eastern part of the Ardennes forms the northernmost third of the Grand Duchy of Luxembourg, also called "Éislek" (German: Oesling). On the southeast the Eifel region continues into the German state of the Rhineland-Palatinate.

The trees and rivers of the Ardennes provided the charcoal industry assets that enabled the great industrial period of Wallonia in the 18th and 19th centuries, when it was arguably the second great industrial region of the world. The greater region maintained an industrial eminence into the 20th century, after coal replaced charcoal in metallurgy. The strategic position of the Ardennes has made it a battleground for European powers for centuries; it was the site of major battles during both World Wars.

== Geography ==
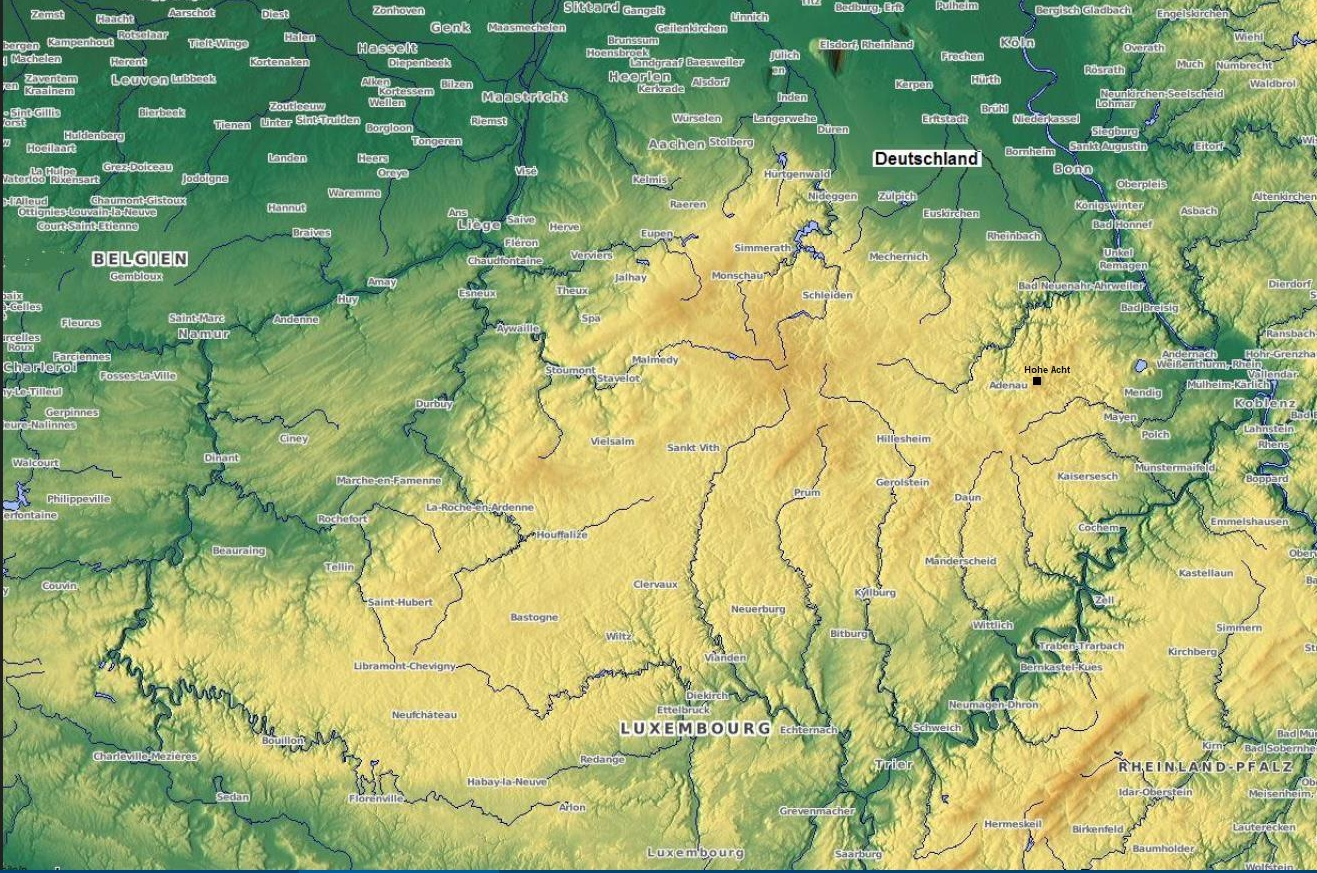
Morphologically connected mountains of Ardennes and Eifel, framed by the rivers Semois, Meuse, Moselle and Rhine. The highest elevation is the Hohe Acht at 746.9 m above sea level. NHN

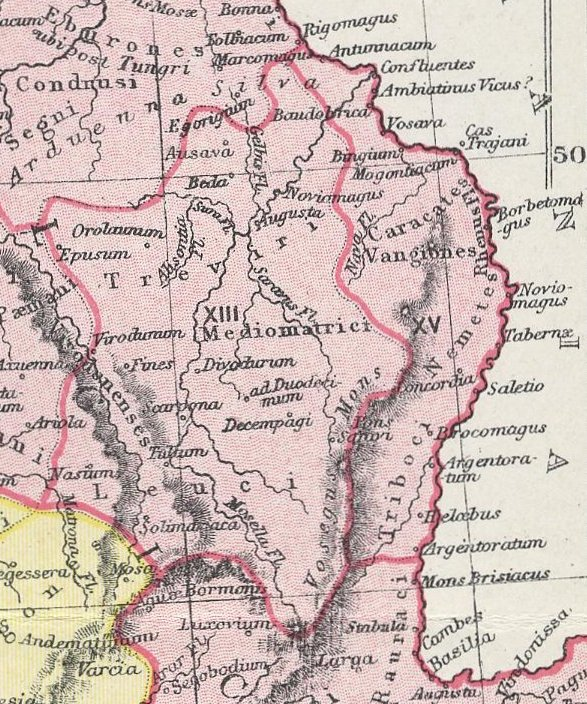
Arduenna silva between Maas und Rhein

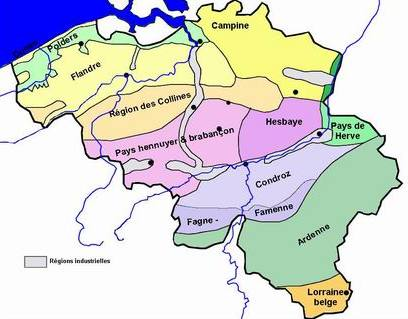
The Ardennes in Belgium

Much of the Ardennes is covered in dense forests, with the hills averaging around 350–400 m (1,150–1,310 ft) in height but rising to over 694 m (2,277 ft) in the boggy moors of the High Fens region of south-eastern Belgium. The region is typified by steep-sided valleys carved by swift-flowing rivers, the most prominent of which is the Meuse. Its most populous cities are Verviers in Belgium and Charleville-Mézières in France, both exceeding 50,000 inhabitants. The Ardennes is otherwise relatively sparsely populated, with few of the towns exceeding 10,000 inhabitants. (Exceptions include Belgium's Eupen and Bastogne.)

The Eifel range in Germany adjoins the Ardennes and is part of the same geological formation, although they are conventionally regarded as being two distinct areas.

=== High ranging summits ===
- Signal de Botrange 694 m (2,277 ft), Liège Province, Belgium - highest point in the Ardennes, highest point in the Benelux countries
- Weißer Stein 692 m (2,270 ft), Mürringen, Liège Province, Belgium
- Baraque Michel 674 m (2,211 ft), Liège Province, Belgium
- Baraque de Fraiture, 652 m (2,139 ft), highest point of the Plateau des Tailles, Luxembourg Province, Belgium
- Lieu-dit (= hamlet) Galata, 589 m (1,932 ft), highest point on the Plateau de Saint-Hubert, Luxembourg Province, Belgium
- Kneiff, 560 m (1,840 ft), highest point in the nation of Luxembourg (Grand Duchy of Luxembourg)
- Buurgplaatz, 559 m (1,834 ft), Grand Duchy of Luxembourg
- Napoléonsgaard, 547 m (1,795 ft), near Rambrouch, Grand Duchy of Luxembourg
- Croix Scaille 504 m (1,654 ft), on the border of the provinces of Namur, Belgium, and Champagne, France

== Geology ==
The Ardennes are the remnants of a mountain range formed during the Hercynian orogeny; in France similar formations are the Armorican Massif, the Massif Central, and the Vosges. The low interior of such former mountains often contains coal, plus iron, zinc and other metals in the sub-soil. This geologic fact explains the greatest part of the geography of Wallonia and its history. In the North and West of the Ardennes lie the valleys of the Sambre and Meuse rivers, forming an arc (Sillon industriel) going across the most industrial provinces of Wallonia, for example Hainaut Province, along the river Haine (the etymology of Hainaut); the Borinage, the Centre and Charleroi along the river Sambre; Liège Province along the river Meuse.

The region the Ardennes are part of has been uplifted further in the last few hundred thousand years by a mantle plume, as measured from the present elevation of old river terraces, with the largest amount of uplift concentrated in the east, where the Ardennes connect with the Eifel, where the same mantle plume is also responsible for volcanic activity.

This geological region is important in the history of Wallonia because this former mountain is at the origin of the economy, the history, and the geography of Wallonia. "Wallonia presents a wide range of rocks of various ages. Some geological stages internationally recognized were defined from rock sites located in Wallonia: e.g., Frasnian (Frasnes-lez-Couvin), Famennian (Famenne), Tournaisian (Tournai), Visean (Visé), Dinantian (Dinant), and Namurian (Namur)". Except for the Tournaisian, all these rocks are within the Ardennes geological area.

== Economy ==
The Ardennes includes the greatest part of Belgium's Luxembourg Province (not to be confused with the neighbouring Grand Duchy of Luxembourg), the south of Namur Province, and Liège Province, plus a very small part of Hainaut Province, as well as the northernmost third of the Grand Duchy of Luxembourg, called "Éislek" (German: Ösling) and the main part of the French Ardennes department.

Before the 19th century industrialization, the first furnaces in these four Belgian provinces (all in the Wallonia region) and in the French Ardennes used charcoal for fuel, made from harvesting the Ardennes forest. This industry was also in the extreme south of present-day Luxembourg Province (which until 1839 was part of the Grand Duchy of Luxembourg), in the region called Gaume. The most important part of the Walloon steel industry, using coal, was built around the coal mines, mainly in the region around the cities of Liège, Charleroi, La Louvière, the Borinage, and further in the Walloon Brabant (in Tubize). Wallonia became the second industrial power area of the world (after Great Britain) in proportion to its territory and to its population (see further).

The rugged terrain and the harsh climate of the Ardennes limits the scope for agriculture; arable and dairy farming in cleared areas form the mainstay of the agricultural economy. The region is rich in timber and minerals, and Liège and the city of Namur are both major industrial centres. The extensive forests have an abundant population of wild game. The scenic beauty of the region and its wide variety of outdoor activities, including hunting, cycling, walking and canoeing, make it a popular tourist destination.

== Etymology ==
The region takes its name from the vast ancient forest known as Arduenna Silva in the Roman Period. Arduenna probably derives from a Gaulish cognate of the Brythonic word ardu- as in the Welsh: ardd ("high") and the Latin arduus ("high", "steep"). The second element is less certain, but may be related to the Celtic element *windo- as in the Welsh wyn/wen ("fair", "blessed"), which tentatively suggests an original meaning of "forest of blessed/fair heights".

The Ardennes probably shares this derivation with the numerous Arden place names in Britain, including the Forest of Arden.

== History ==
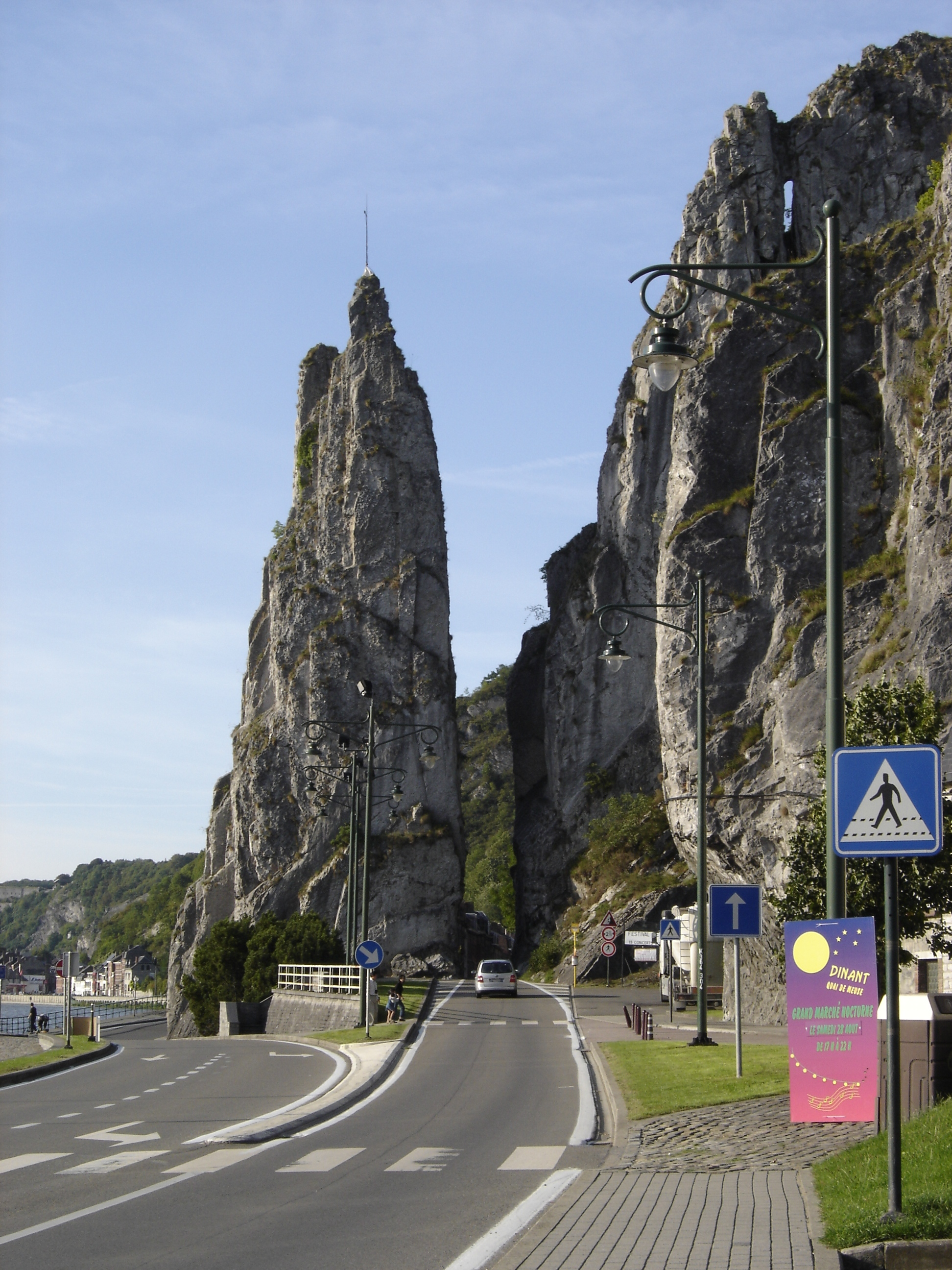
Bayard Rock, Dinant, on the right bank of the Meuse. According to a legend, a magic horse jumped from the top of this rock to the left bank of the river, carrying the Four Sons of Aymon fleeing Charlemagne.

The modern Ardennes region covers a greatly diminished area from the forest recorded in Roman times.

A song about Charlemagne, the Old French 12th-century chanson de geste Quatre Fils Aymon, mentions many of Wallonia's rivers, villages and other places. In Dinant the rock named Bayard takes its name from Bayard, the magic bay horse which, according to legend, jumped from the top of the rock to the other bank of the Meuse.

On their pillaging raids in the years 881 and 882, the Vikings used the old Roman roads in the Ardennes, attacking the abbeys of Malmedy and Stavelot and destroying Prüm Abbey in the Eifel.

The strategic position of the Ardennes has made it a battleground for European powers for many centuries. Much of the Ardennes formed part of the Duchy (since 1815, the Grand Duchy) of Luxembourg, a member state of the Holy Roman Empire, which changed hands numerous times between the powerful dynasties of Europe. In 1793 revolutionary France annexed the entire area, together with all other territories west of the Rhine river. In 1815, the Congress of Vienna, which dealt with the political aftermath of the Napoleonic Wars, restored the previous geographical situation, with most of the Ardennes becoming part of the Grand Duchy of Luxembourg. After the revolution of 1830, which resulted in the establishment of the Kingdom of Belgium, the political future of the Ardennes became a matter of much dispute between Belgium, Luxembourg and the Netherlands, as well as involving the contemporary great powers of France, Prussia, and Great Britain. As a result, in 1839, the Grand Duchy of Luxembourg ceded the westernmost 63% of its territory (being also the main part of the Ardennes) to the new Kingdom of Belgium, which is now its Luxembourg Province.

In the 20th century, leading military strategists generally considered the Ardennes to be unsuitable for large-scale military operations, due to its difficult terrain and narrow communication lines. However, in World War I as well as World War II, Germany successfully gambled on making a rapid passage through the Ardennes to attack a relatively lightly defended part of France. The Ardennes became the site of three major battles during the world wars: the Battle of the Ardennes (August 1914) in World War I, the Battle of France (1940), and the Battle of the Bulge (1944–1945) in World War II. Many of the towns of the region suffered severe damage during the two world wars and its various battles.

1914

The Battles of the Frontiers (1914) involved a series of skirmishes between the French and the German armies. The French forces carried out a counter-offensive ("Plan XVII"), attacking the flank of the westward-advancing German army executing its Schlieffen Plan.

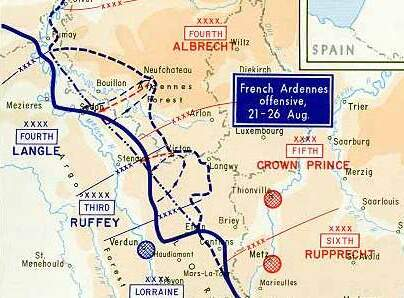
The Battle of the Ardennes (1914) was the second of the Battles of the Frontiers. After the advancing German left wing defeated French forces in Lorraine, France launched another attack just north of Lorraine, advancing temporarily into the Ardennes.

Allied generals in World War II believed that the region was impenetrable to massed vehicular traffic and especially armoured tanks, so the area was effectively "all but undefended" during the war. The German Army twice used this region to invade northern France and southern Belgium, via Luxembourg in the Battle of France and the later Battle of the Bulge.

In 1939 and 1940, Nazi Germany's military strategists selected the forest as the primary route of their mechanised forces in the Invasion of France. The forest's great size could conceal the armoured divisions, and because the French did not suspect that the Germans would make such a risky move, they either did not consider a breakthrough there, or imagined that it would take at least 15 days for an army to pass through the forest. German forces, primarily under the command of Erich von Manstein, carried out the plan in two days, and managed to slip numerous divisions past the Maginot Line to attack France from the north, and rout the French forces. In May 1940 the German army crossed the Meuse, despite the resistance of the French Army. Under the command of General Heinz Guderian, the German armoured divisions crossed the river at Dinant and at Sedan, France. This was a crucial step in the push towards Paris, and France fell on 25 June 1940.

1940

Battle of France (1940) The Germans execute Erich Von Manstein's plan for Fall Gelb. Armoured divisions cross the Meuse (16 May), (principally in Dinant), Sedan and the Ardennes. The Ardennes are located just to the east of the red shading which marks the extent of the German advance. On 16 May General Maurice Gamelin said he could no longer protect Paris because he had lost the Ardennes.

Battle of France (1940) The Wehrmacht advances further, particularly accelerating through the Gembloux gap northwest of the Ardennes, in the week of 21 May (red shading), quickly reaching Abbeville, near the English Channel. This cut off the Allied troops of the North (some French divisions, the Belgian Army and the British Expeditionary Force). In this way, the German armies won the first stage of the Battle of France.

At the other end of the war, the Ardennes area came to prominence again during the Battle of the Bulge. The German Army, which had been forced to retreat for some time, launched a surprise attack in December 1944 in an attempt to recapture Antwerp and to drive a wedge between the advancing British and American forces in northern France. After a fierce battle the Allied forces blocked the German advance on the river Meuse at Dinant.

1944

Battle of the Bulge. In 1944, the Germans counterattacked across the Ardennes and the Meuse valley but they were eventually thwarted after fierce battles. Their most advanced position was the "nose" of the salient, just in front of Dinant and the Meuse river. They had wanted to move northeast and reach Antwerp and the North Sea.

The salient was mainly in the Ardennes, its "nose" being just to the west of it, in the Condroz. Areas above 400 metres (1,300 ft) (shown in the darkest shade of brown) form the heart of the Ardennes.

In the postwar period, the Ardennes has become a weekend retreat that is popular among Belgians as well as people from neighbouring countries. The tourist industry offers an extensive and varied range of activities and types of accommodation.

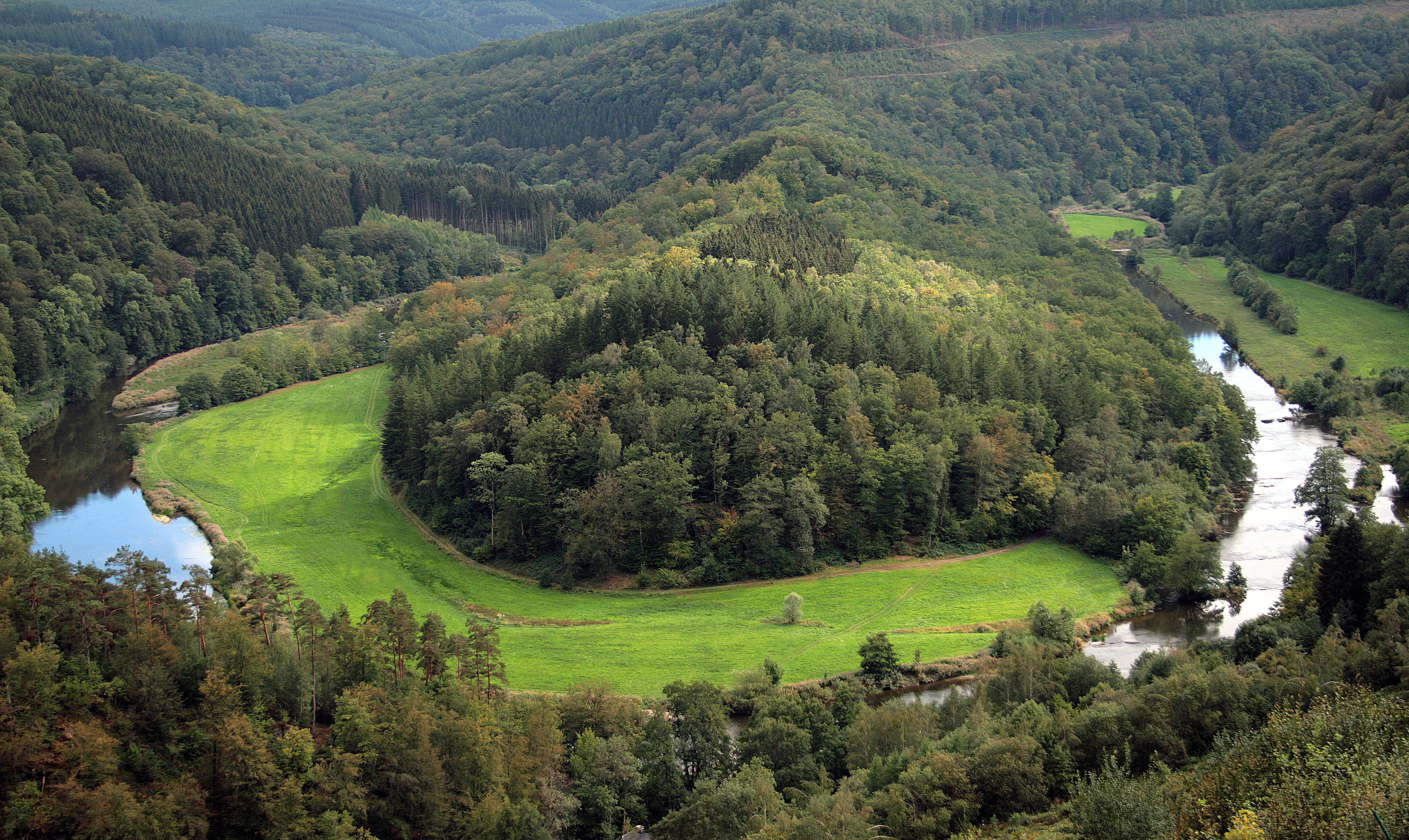
Panorama of Botassart or Le Tombeau du Géant (Giant's Tomb) along the Semois

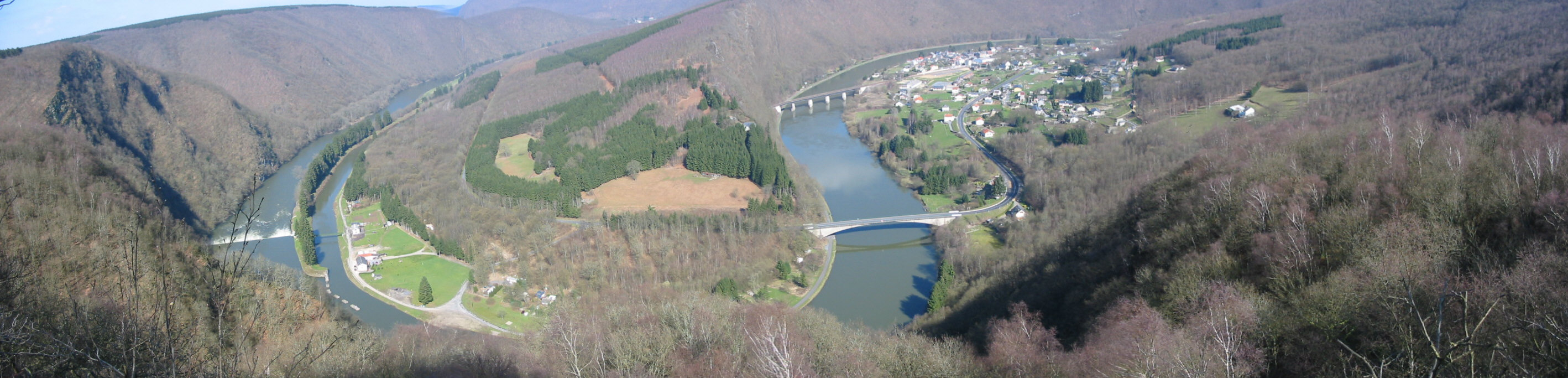
View of the Meuse in the French Ardennes

== See also ==
- Flemish Ardennes, an unconnected region in East Flanders
- Jambon sec des Ardennes
- Regional Natural Park of the Ardennes
