= List of protected heritage sites in Jalhay =

This table shows an overview of the protected heritage sites in the Walloon town Jalhay. This list is part of Belgium's national heritage.

Object	Year/architect	Town/section	Address	Coordinates	Number^{?}	Image
Organs of the church of Saint-Hubert ^{(nl)} ^{(fr)}		Jalhay		50.555226°N 5.933839°E	63038-CLT-0001-01 Info	
Colonial Panhaus ^{(nl)} ^{(fr)}		Jalhay		50.525433°N 6.044143°E	63038-CLT-0002-01 Info	
Lespire house: walls and roofs ^{(nl)} ^{(fr)}		Jalhay	place du Marché, n°230	50.516923°N 5.931632°E	63038-CLT-0003-01 Info	Huis Lespire: gevels en daken
Bell tower of the church of Saint-Lambert ^{(nl)} ^{(fr)}		Jalhay		50.517262°N 5.933488°E	63038-CLT-0004-01 Info	Klokkentoren kerk Saint-Lambert
Old oak tree and pond ^{(nl)} ^{(fr)}		Jalhay		50.517152°N 5.933666°E	63038-CLT-0005-01 Info	Oude eik, vijver
Border marker B p.155 ^{(nl)} ^{(fr)}		Jalhay		50.519177°N 6.066887°E	63038-CLT-0007-01 Info	Grenspaal B-P.155
Border marker B-P.156 ^{(nl)} ^{(fr)}		Jalhay		50.519616°N 6.073005°E	63038-CLT-0008-01 Info	
geodesic marker of the "Baraque Michel" ^{(nl)} ^{(fr)} ^{(de)}		Jalhay		50.520743°N 6.062855°E	63038-CLT-0009-01 Info	
Border marker ^{(nl)} ^{(fr)}		Jalhay		50.525869°N 6.072879°E	63038-CLT-0010-01 Info	
Border marker FI-CI Sud ^{(nl)} ^{(fr)}		Jalhay		50.520979°N 6.072977°E	63038-CLT-0011-01 Info	
Group of historic artifacts of Jalhay, Baelen, Waimes & Malmédy ^{(nl)} ^{(fr)}		Jalhay		50.525604°N 6.044209°E	63038-CLT-0012-01 Info	Ensemble van verschillende historische bewijzen en omgeving, op het grondgebied van de sections Jalhay, Baelen, Waimes en Malmédy

== See also ==
- List of protected heritage sites in Liège (province)
- Jalhay
