= Hoëgne =

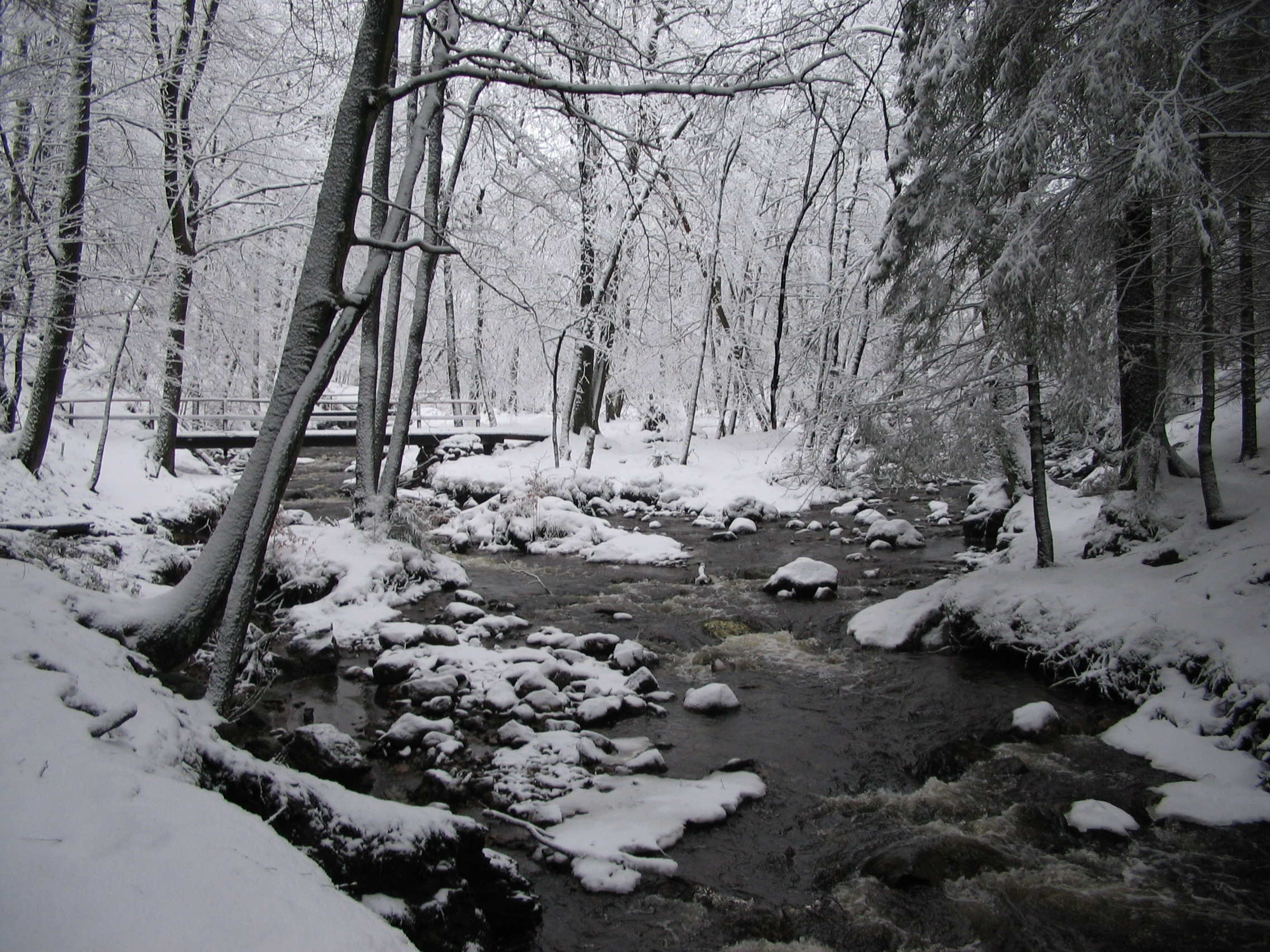
- The Hoëgne near Hockai

Location
- Country: Belgium

Physical characteristics
- Mouth: Vesdre
  - coordinates: 50°34′08″N 5°48′06″E

Basin features
- Progression: Vesdre→ Ourthe→ Meuse→ North Sea

The Hoëgne (French pronunciation: [ɔɲ]) is a river in Belgium, a left tributary of the Vesdre. Its source is in the High Fens of eastern Belgium, near the Signal de Botrange. The Hoëgne flows through Theux, and ends in the Vesdre in Pepinster.
