= Baraque Michel =

Coordinates: 50.518611°N 6.0625°E

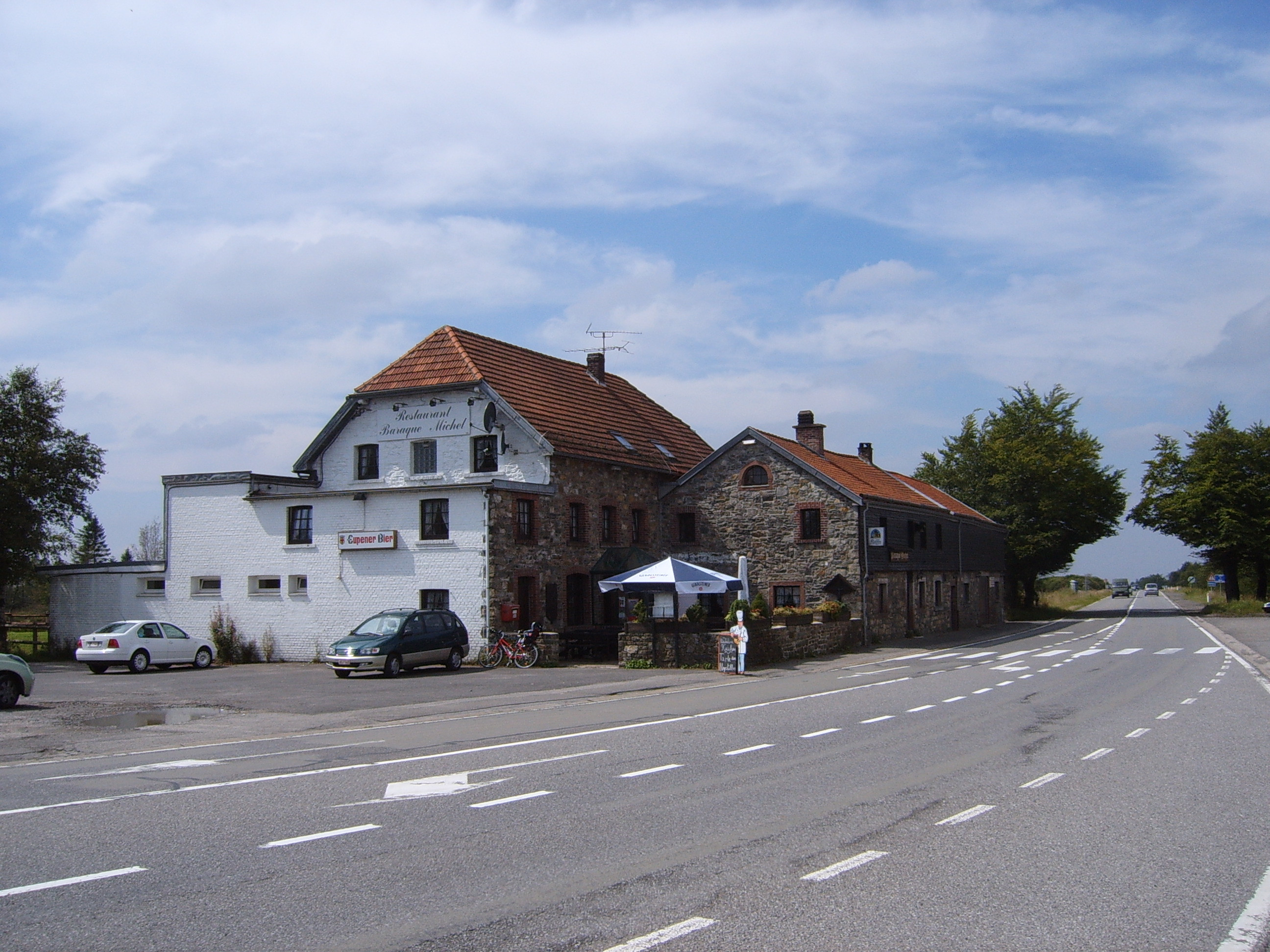
Baraque Michel in summer

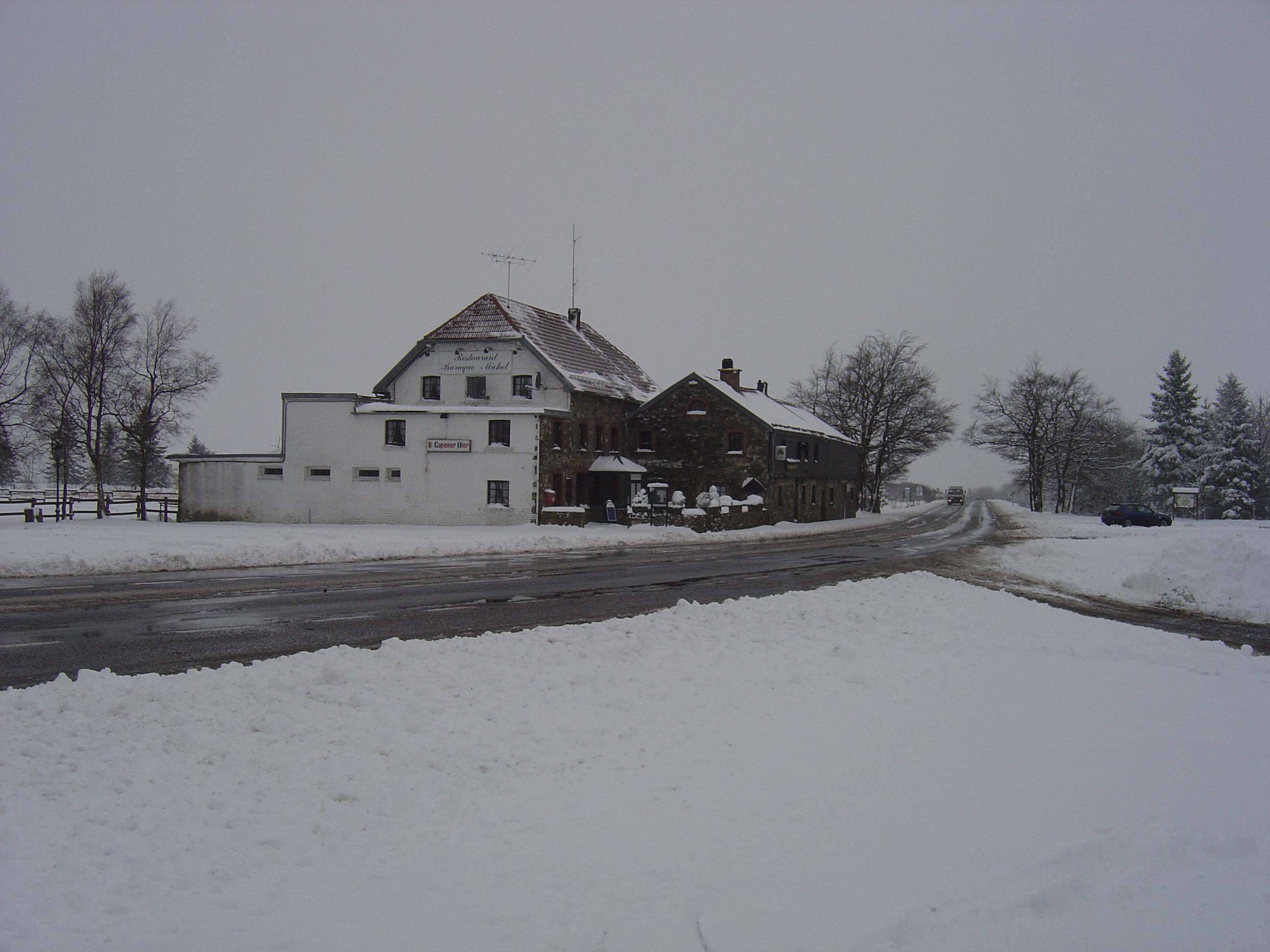
Baraque Michel in winter

The Baraque Michel (French pronunciation: [baʁak miʃɛl]; German: Michelshütte) is a locality in the municipality Jalhay, in the High Fens, Wallonia. Before the annexation of the Eastern Cantons by Belgium in 1919, it was the highest point of Belgium. Now it is the third highest point at 674 metres (2,211 ft), after the nearby Signal de Botrange (694 metres (2,277 ft)) and the Weißer Stein (691 metres (2,267 ft)).

The Baraque itself is an inn and the starting point of many excursions. The Baraque Michel was founded between 1811 and 1813 by Michel Schmitz, of Herbiester (a hamlet close to Jalhay), already as an inn, but also as refuge for stray travellers: a bell was sounded there during fog, which allowed the rescue of more than one hundred people during the 19th century.

The establishment was also used as relay for the mail coaches, that connected the two then Prussian towns of Eupen and Malmedy. The direct connection was partly through Belgian territory, along the current N68 road.

Several rivers of Belgium, part of the basin of Vesdre, take their source in the vicinity. The principal ones are Gileppe, Hoëgne and Helle.
