= Gileppe =

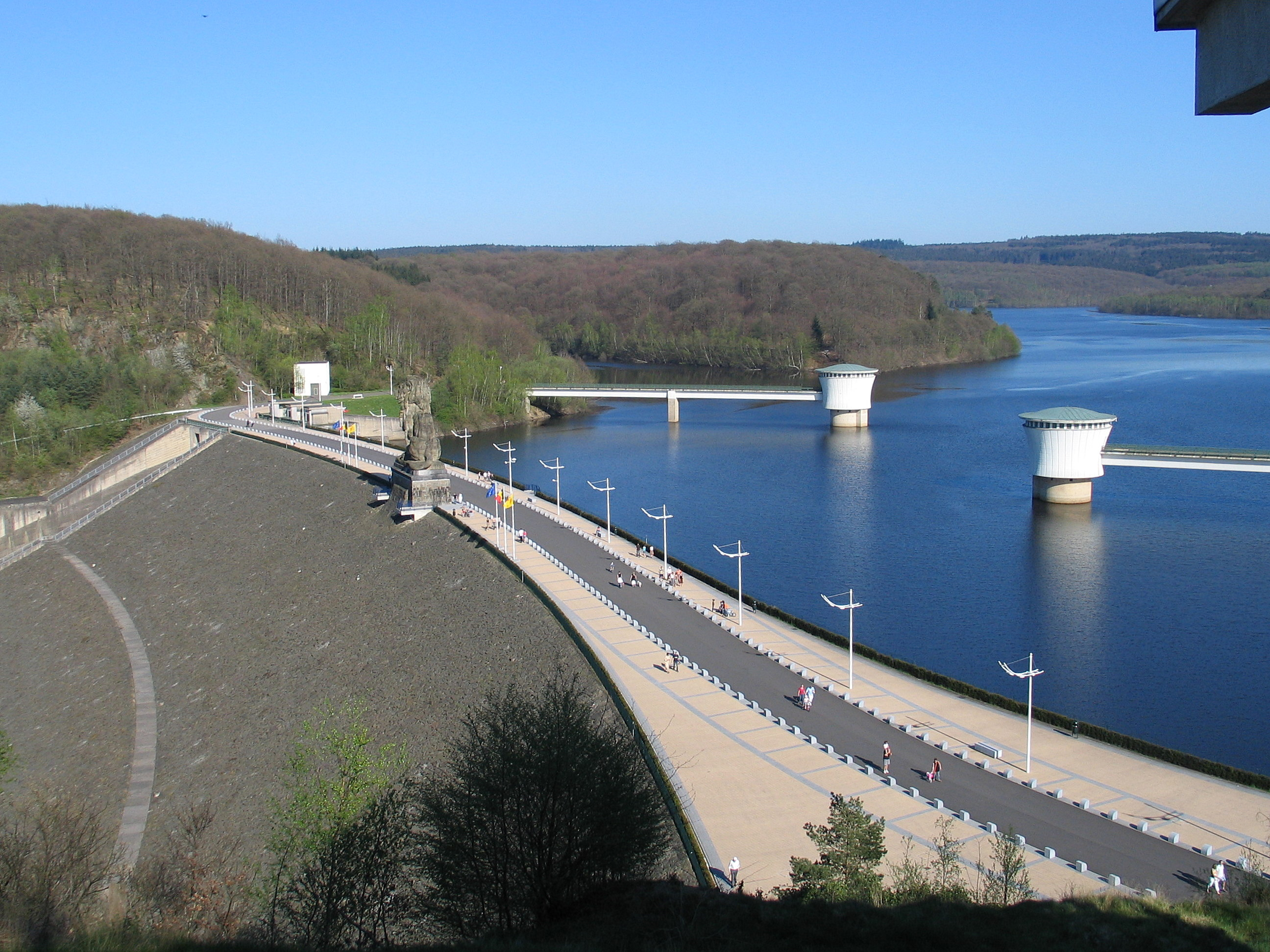

Location
- Country: Belgium

Physical characteristics
- Mouth: Vesdre
  - coordinates: 50°36′08″N 5°58′12″E
- Length: 20 kilometres (12 miles)

Basin features
- Progression: Vesdre→ Ourthe→ Meuse→ North Sea

Gileppe (French pronunciation: [ʒilɛp]) is a river in Belgium with a length of about 20 kilometres (12 mi). It is a left tributary of the Vesdre. Its source is in the High Fens of eastern Belgium. The Gileppe flows through an artificial lake (Lac de la Gileppe), built in 1867–78 and enlarged to 1.3 square kilometres (0.50 mi^{2}) in 1968–71, created by the Gileppe Dam. The Gileppe flows into the Vesdre between Eupen and Limbourg.
