= High Fens =

Plateau straddling eastern Belgium and western Germany

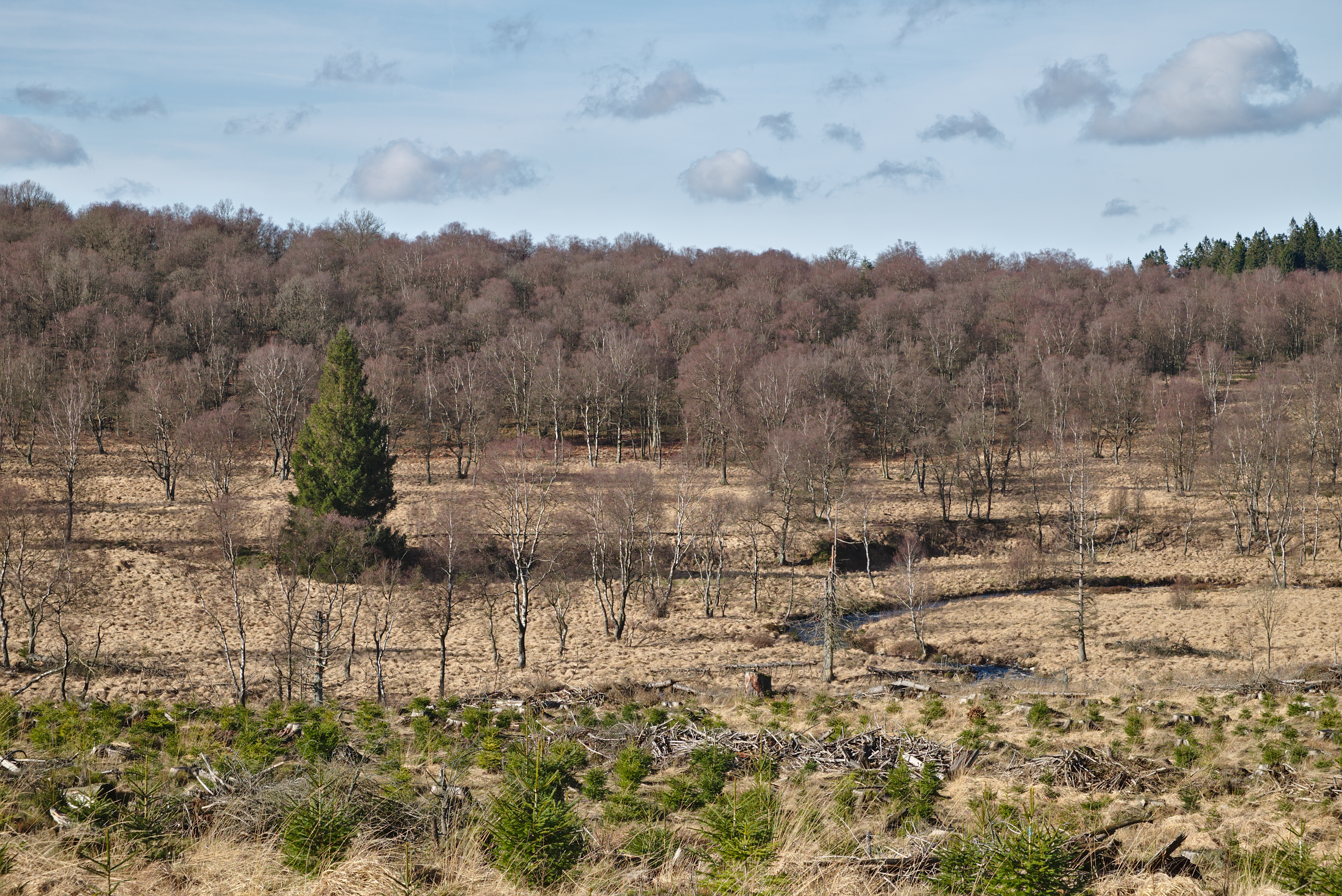
- Fagne Tîrifaye in Waimes

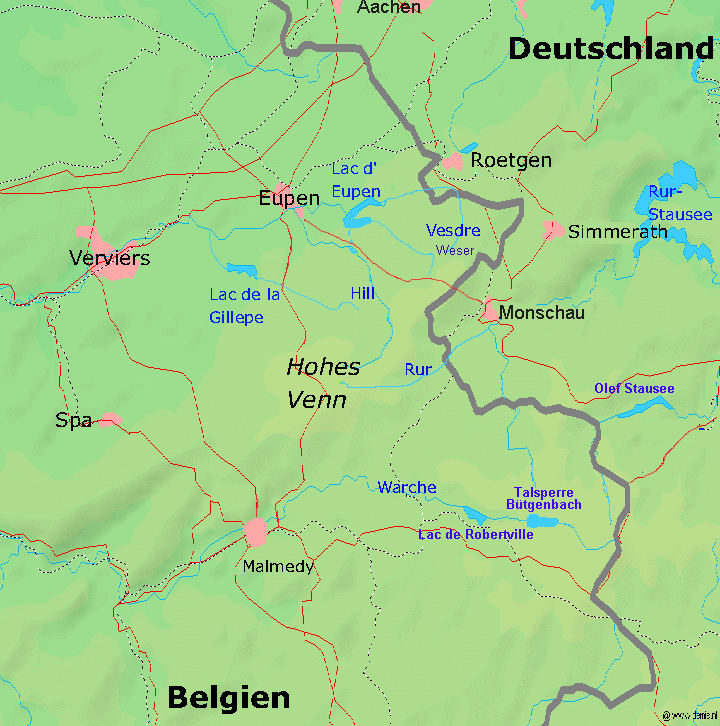
- Map of the High Fens
- Location: Liège Province, in Belgium and also in nearby parts of Germany, between the Ardennes and the Eifel
- Coordinates: 50°32′40″N 6°4′40″E
- Area: 4,501.2 ha (17.379 sq mi)
- Established: 1957 as Nature Reserve

Ramsar Wetland
- Official name: Les Hautes Fagnes
- Designated: 24 March 2003
- Reference no.: 1405

The High Fens (German: Hohes Venn; French: Hautes Fagnes; Dutch: Hoge Venen), which were declared a nature reserve in 1957, are an upland area, a plateau region in Liège Province, in the east of Belgium and adjoining parts of northwestern Germany, between the Ardennes and the Eifel highlands. The High Fens are the largest nature reserve or park in Belgium, with an area of 4,501.2 ha (11,123 acres; 45.012 km^{2}); it lies within the German-Belgian natural park Hohes Venn-Eifel (700 km^{2} (270 mi^{2})), in the Ardennes. Its highest point, at 694 metres (2,277 ft) above sea level, is the Signal de Botrange near Eupen, and also the highest point in Belgium. A tower 6 metres (20 ft) high was built here that reaches 700 metres (2,297 ft) above sea level. The reserve is a rich ecological endowment of Belgium covered with alpine sphagnum raised bogs (watered only by precipitation, instead of surface water, as the appellation “fens” would imply), both on the plateau and in the valley basin; the bogs, which are over 10,000 years old, with their unique subalpine flora, fauna and microclimate, are key to the conservation work of the park.

In 1966, the European Council awarded the "Diploma of Conservation" to the High Fens, for their ecological value. In 2008, Belgium has added the High Fens to its tentative list of UNESCO World Heritage sites.

== Geography ==
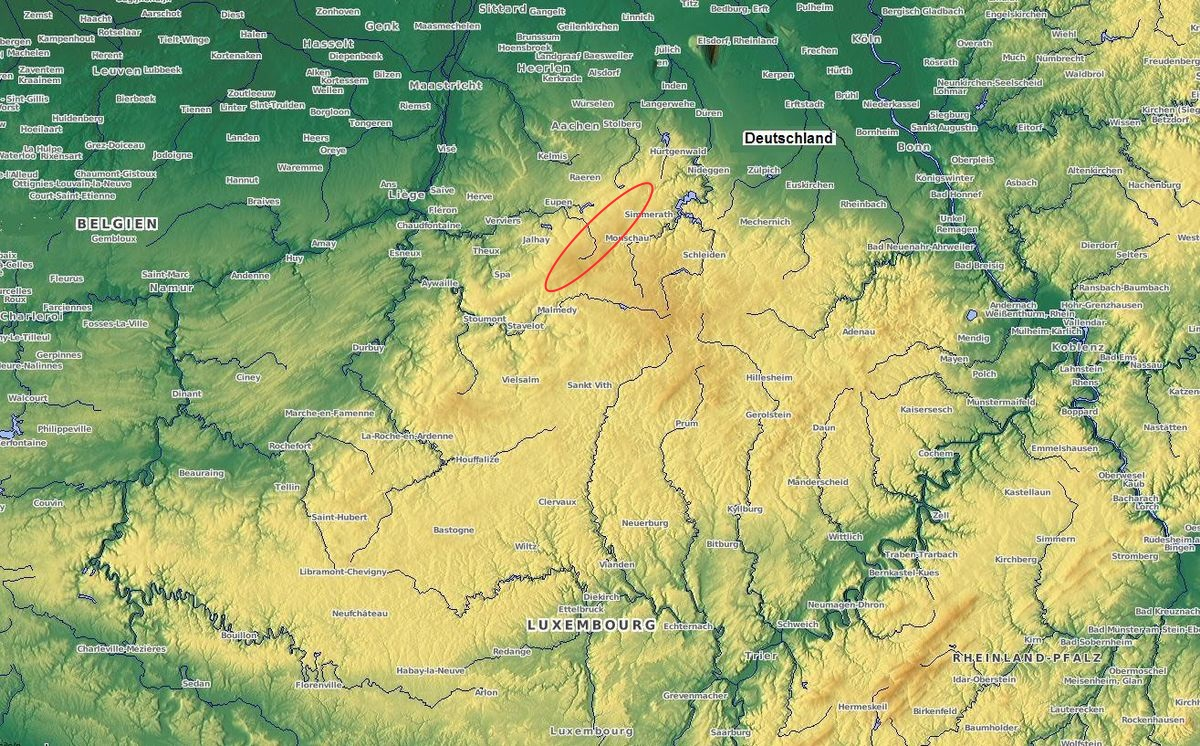
Ardennes and Eifel highlands; the ellipse marks the location of the High Fens.

The High Fens, established as a reserve in 1957, with their high altitude and unique location, consist mainly of raised bogs, and low, grass- or wood-covered hills, moorland and forest. The provincial capital of Liège is to its west, the German border is to the east and the dark forested hills of the Ardennes surround the southern part. The park stretches between Eupen in the north, Monschau in the east, Spa in the west and Malmedy in the south. It stretches north of Malmedy as far as Eupen and marks the end of the Ardennes proper. It is contiguous with the Eifel hills, which stretch east from the German border to form the large Deutsch–Belgischer Naturpark. Signal de Botrange located in the Haute Fagnes is marked by a Telecom Tower erected over an older artificial, earthen mound with stone steps that was built to raise a small part of the broad plateau from 694 to 700 metres (2,277 to 2,297 ft). Large urban centres in the vicinity of the reserve are Eupen, Verviers, Spa and Malmedy.

Part of the High Fens reserve remains closed during the spring breeding season of the endangered black grouse (Tetrao tetrix). During the summer there is a risk of fire in the forest area. Boardwalks cross the bogs, permitting access across these areas. Paths lead to many areas of the park, and there are signposts to guide visitors through the park. The nature reserve of the High Fens is coordinated under the Nature Division and Forests of the Walloon Region.

=== Climate ===
The reserve is one of the wettest and coldest parts of Belgium. It is frequently shrouded in mist and low cloud. It has a subalpine climate with strong winds and fierce winters, which are occasionally subarctic. The Fagnes plateau intercepts clouds brought by the prevailing Atlantic winds, and this results in copious precipitation, with an average of 1,400 millimetres (55 in) of rain per year. However, beneath the fragile composition of the overlying soils are rocky beds and clay that prevent infiltration of water and thus create the conditions for wetlands, marshes and bogs.

The highest and lowest annual rainfall recorded are 2,024 millimetres (79.7 in) and 762 millimetres (30.0 in) respectively, with maximum on a single day of 156 millimetres (6.1 in) on 7 October 1982 at the Signal de Botrange. The maximum snowfall recorded at Signal de Botrange was 115 centimetres (45 in) in 1953. The maximum number of frost days (when the temperature remains below 0 °C (32 °F)) in a year is reported to be 158 days and the minimum is 70 days. The lowest temperature recorded was −23.6 °C (−10.5 °F) in 1942, but it was −25.2 °C (−13.4 °F) in 1952 at Baraque-Michel.

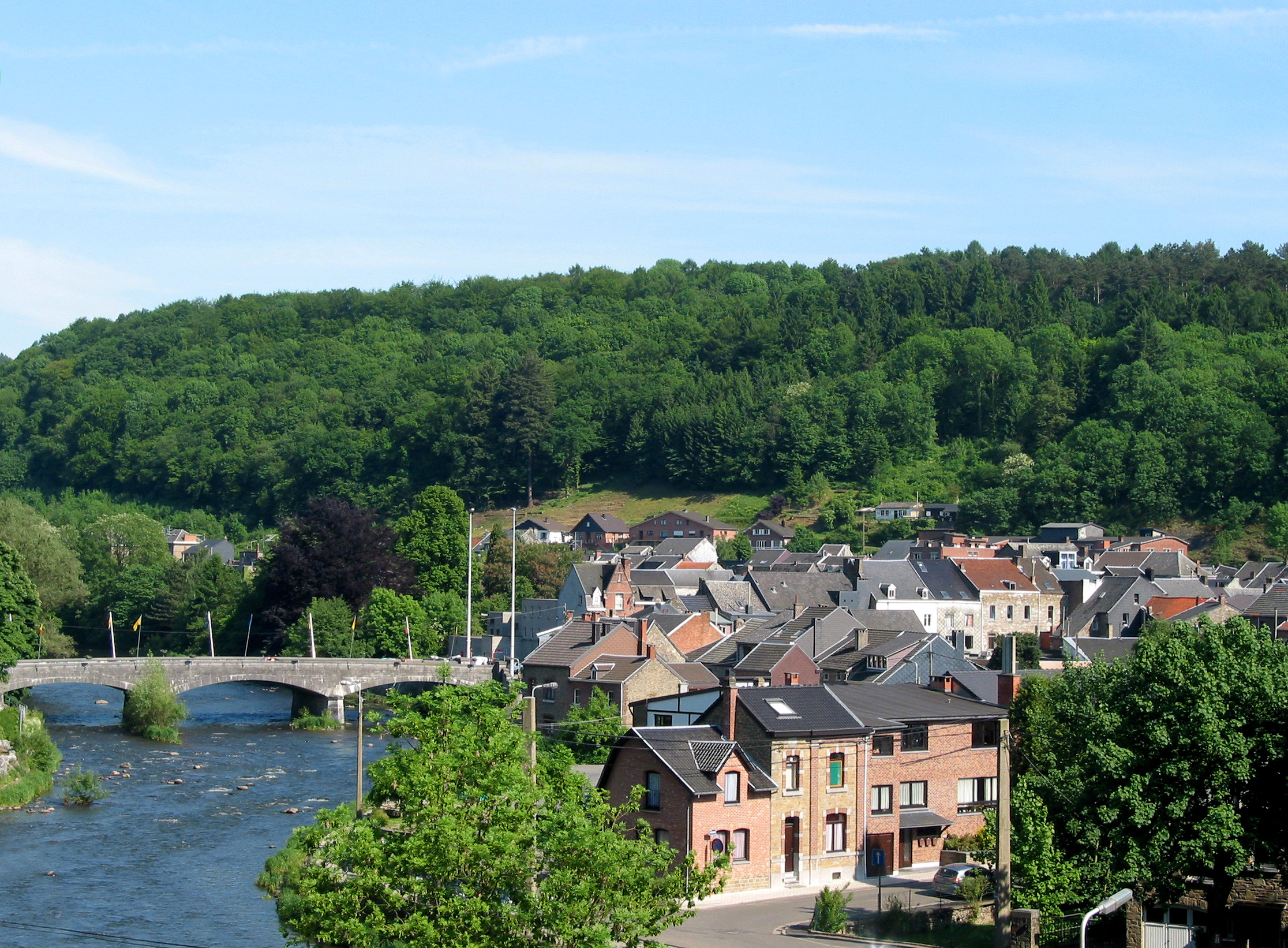
The bridge on the Amblève River.

Several rivers have their sources in the High Fens: the Vesdre, Hoëgne, Warche, Gileppe, Eau Rouge, Amblève, Our, Kyll, and Rur. In winter all the water sources freeze into snow making the High Fens one of the best ski resorts in Belgium. During winter the swamps appear as if "wrapped in white fluffy snow shawl".

=== Zoning ===
The region has been zoned under a 1992 regulation into specific areas to manage access for visitors and tourists. These areas are designated as Zones B, C, and D. Zone B is open to the public daily, with specific regulations: bicycles and dogs are prohibited, visitors must stay on designated tracks, waste must be disposed of in trashcans only, and silence must be maintained. Zone C can be visited only accompanied by a guide authorised by the park administration. However no access to this zone is allowed from mid-March to late June, when an endangered species, the black grouse, breeds here. Zone D is a totally protected reserve area, with no access to the public.

== Flora and fauna ==
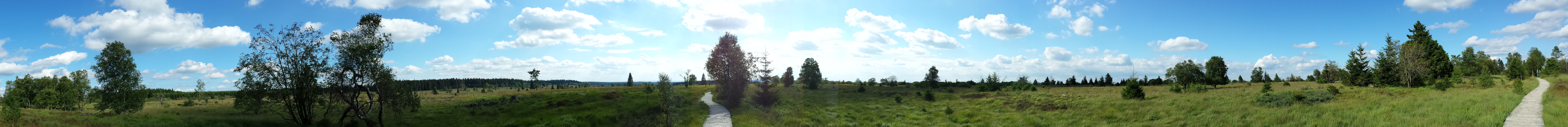
Panorama of the High Fens

In the High Fens the habitats of many plants and animals typically found further north or in the mountains, result from the geology and relief, the harsh climate, high rainfall, long and cold winters and low average temperatures in the region.

The High Venn's plateau thus is rich in flora and fauna some of which have become rare and threatened in the last more than three centuries. The heathers and turf moors in the reserve have a significant role to maintain biodiversity for the rare and threatened flora and fauna as it ensures regulation of the water balance and maintains value of the landscape. However, since the 17th century, peat cutting, drainage, inappropriate spruce plantations, infestation of the ground by the purple moor-grass, a herb, had caused problems for the ecology of the region. These negative aspects are now being rectified by special projects titled "Life-Nature Project".

=== Flora ===
The common heather or Calluna, a small bush of 20–50 centimetres (8–20 in) height is grazed by sheep and also has healing qualities; the bilberry, in the family Ericaceae, is a shrub found at an altitude of 500 m (around 1600 feet); the rootless peat mosses (Sphagnum) of about 40 centimetres (16 in) grow at 3 centimetres (1 in) a year and form the basic turf moors through the buildup of organic matter; cotton grass, a perennial plant in wet regions; sundew (Drosera rotundfolia) found in the acid turfs of the reserve which are carnivores and consumes insects. The logo of the park is the seven-petalled flower of Chickweed-Wintergreen (Lysimachia europaea), not to be confused with other plants with similar names such as Chickweed (Cerastium spp.) or Wintergreen (Gaultheria spp.).

=== Fauna ===
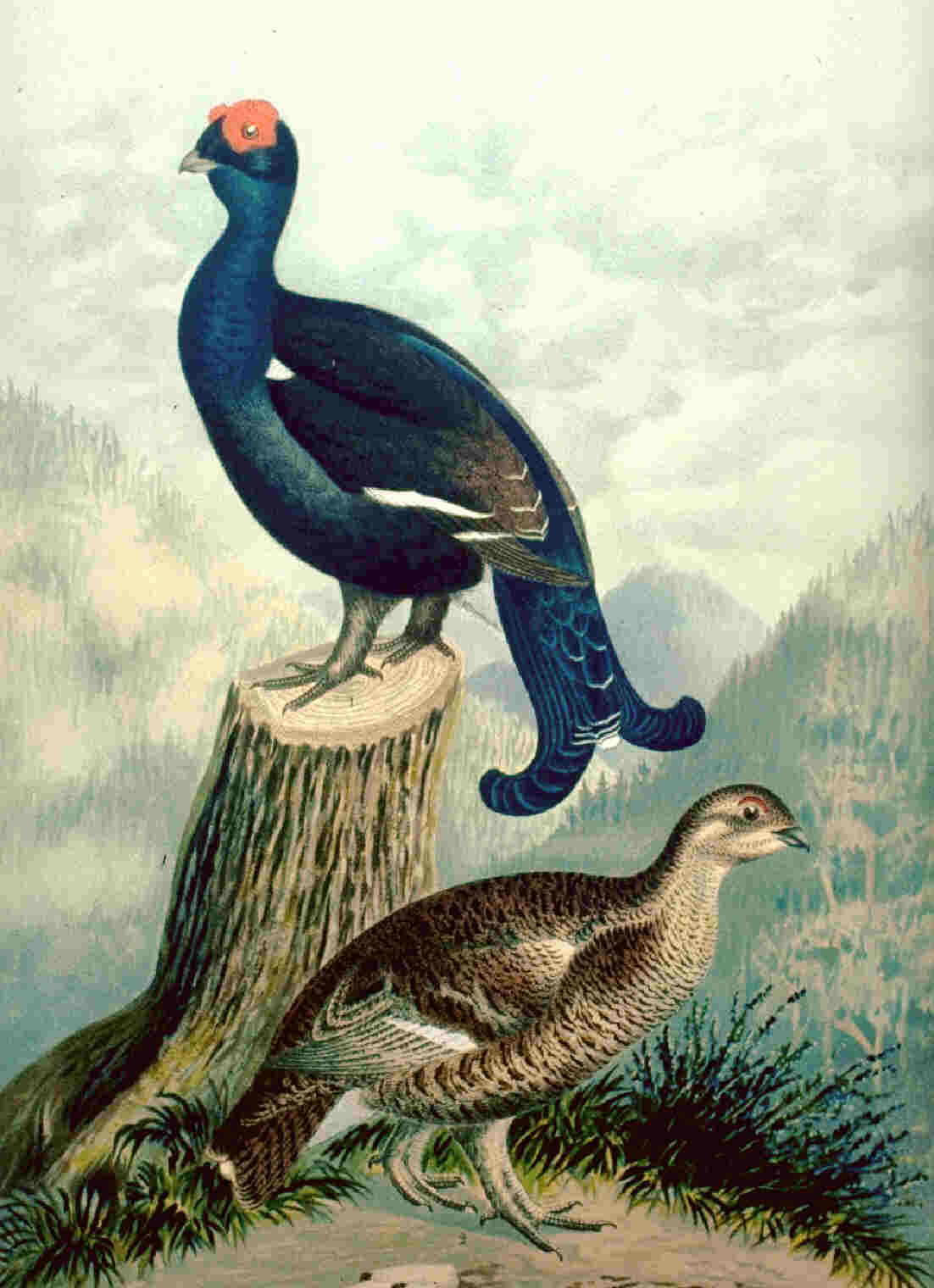
An illustration of the black grouse (Tetrao tetrix), male and female from an early 20th-century natural history

Faunal species recorded are: the wild boar, roe deer, hen harrier, black grouse, wood mouse, grasshopper warbler, great grey shrike, meadow pipit, European stonechat and northern wheatear. The black grouse, a protected species, is found in small numbers. It is a sedentary bird. The male species has black plumage with a red wattle above the eyes while the female species has a brown plumage with black, grey and white stripes and possesses a light forked tail. Vertebrates, spiders and insects reported in the reserve are: orvet (Anguis fragilis), Odonata, Orthoptera, Heteroptera, Lepidoptera, Diptera, crustaceans, myriapods and shellfish.

== Fires ==
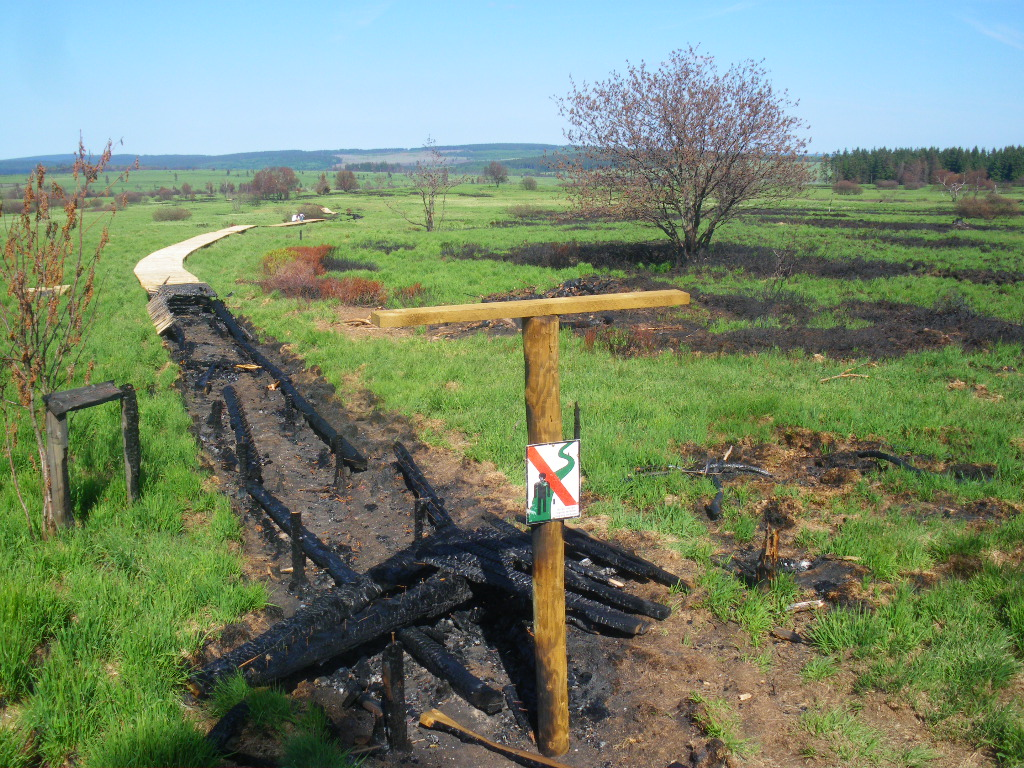
Burnt path in Helle Valley in High Fens, in May 2011, one month after the fire

As the habitat consists of bogs, fire is a major hazard during drought periods, when the Fens are closed except for a small area near Polleur. Triangular signs painted in red are fixed at the fire hazard locations. In April 2011 a fire that broke out in the High Fens 1,000 hectares (2,500 acres) of land were burned. It was said at the time to be the biggest ever fire in the Fens; 300 firefighters supported by a helicopter were involved in dousing and controlling the fires.

On 14 August 2026, a wildfire broke out in the High Fens, burning a third of the nature reserve's area and forcing the evacuation of residents in three Belgian villages and in neighbouring Germany. By the morning of 17 August, over 3,200 hectares were affected, with some five hundred persons fighting the fire, aided by six aircraft.

== Activities ==
The winter sports activities allowed in the Fens in specified area and outside conserved area of the fens are skiing, bicycling and trekking. Cross-country skiing in the High Fens is permitted on specified forest tracks which are located in the outskirts or even outside the nature reserve. Hiking trails have been reorganized outside the parks reserved areas. The walk routes would be limited to undergrowth adjacent to nature reserve. Bicycle routes have been specified outside the nature reserve in nearby forests. The subalpine climate may change to subarctic condition and hence when taking adventure walks in the night through the park it could be hazardous unless one is properly equipped for taking such a risk.

== Monument ==
Another notable monument is at Gèyeté (Gayetay) within the municipal boundary of Sart and Jalhay; it is in memory of eight American airmen who were the crews of two Douglas C-47 Skytrains from 50th Troop Carrier Squadron that collided in flight on 6 April 1945 due to fog. The memorial consists of a three-bladed propeller erected on a quartzite pedestal, with a cross erected next to it with the inscription "For the American airmen."

== Gallery ==
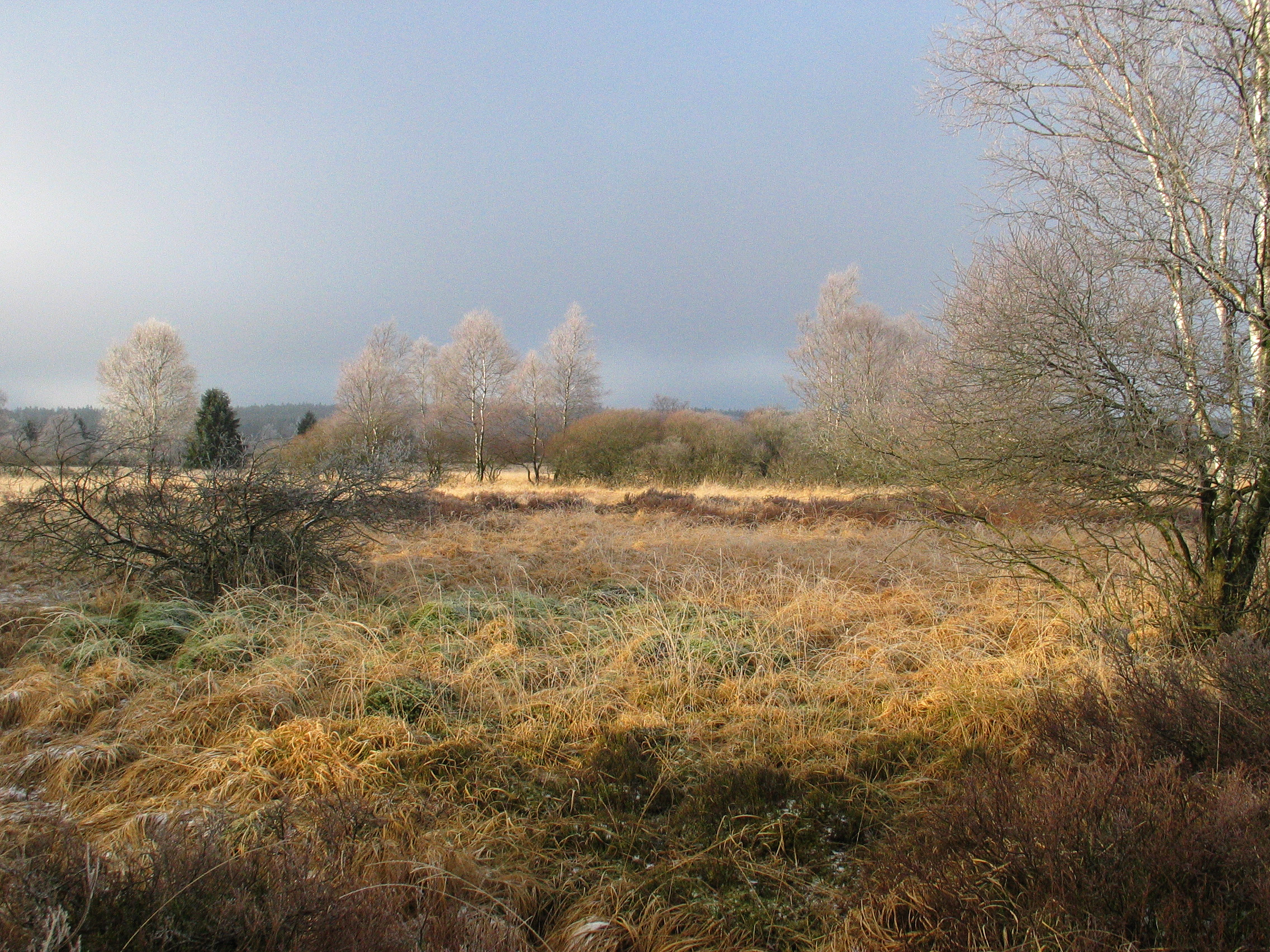
The Fens landscape near the German border

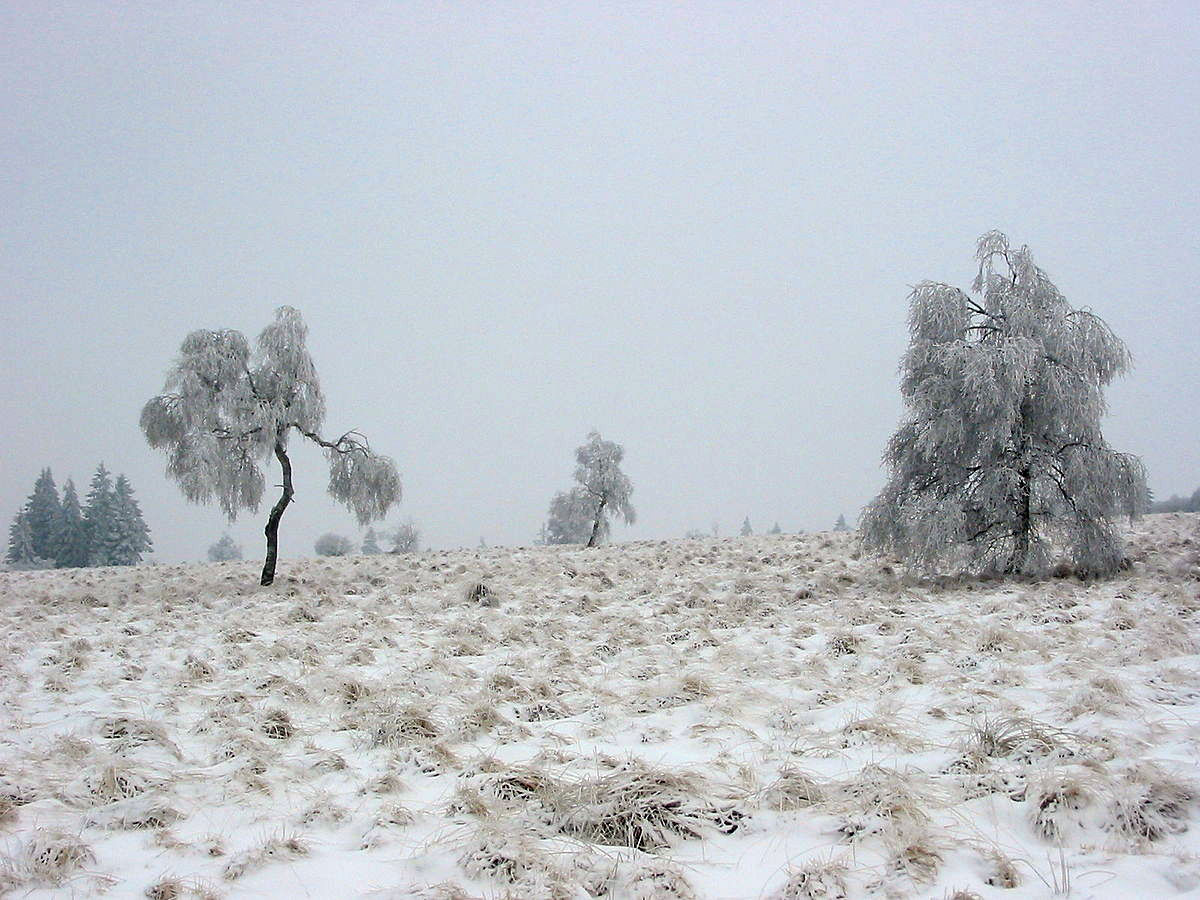
Winter landscape in the High Fens

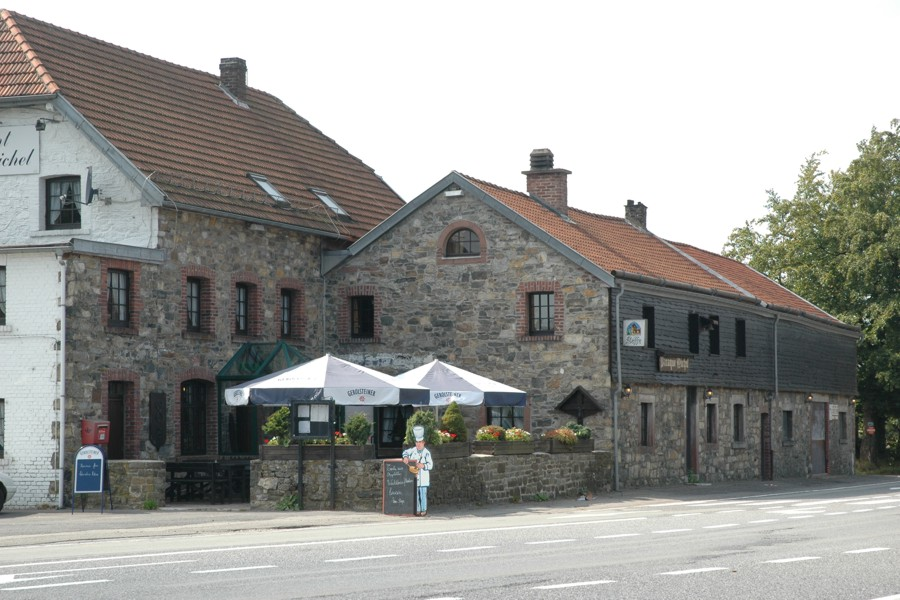
Baraque Michel hostel in Jalhay, third highest point of Belgium (674 m)

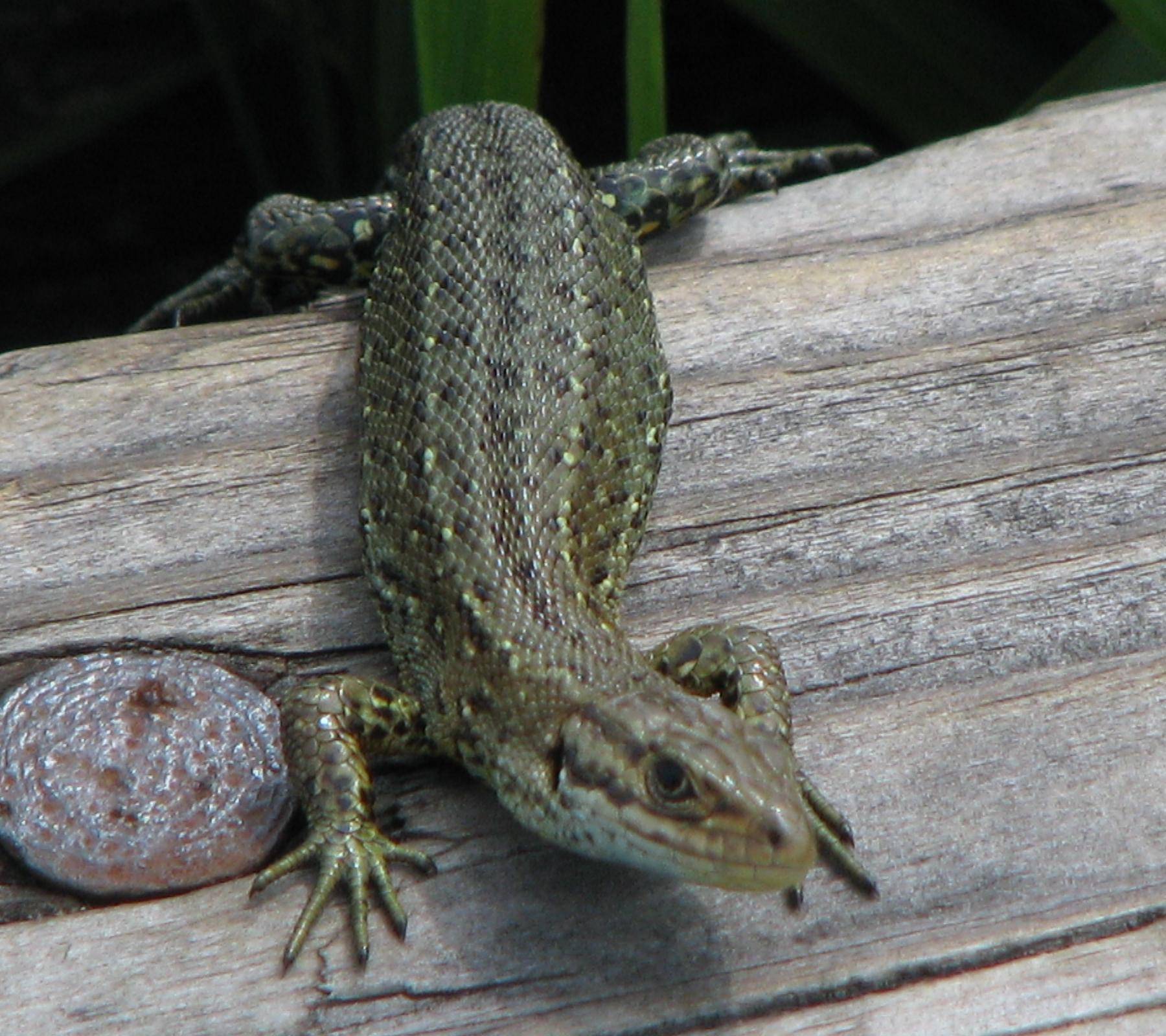
Lacertidae in High Fens

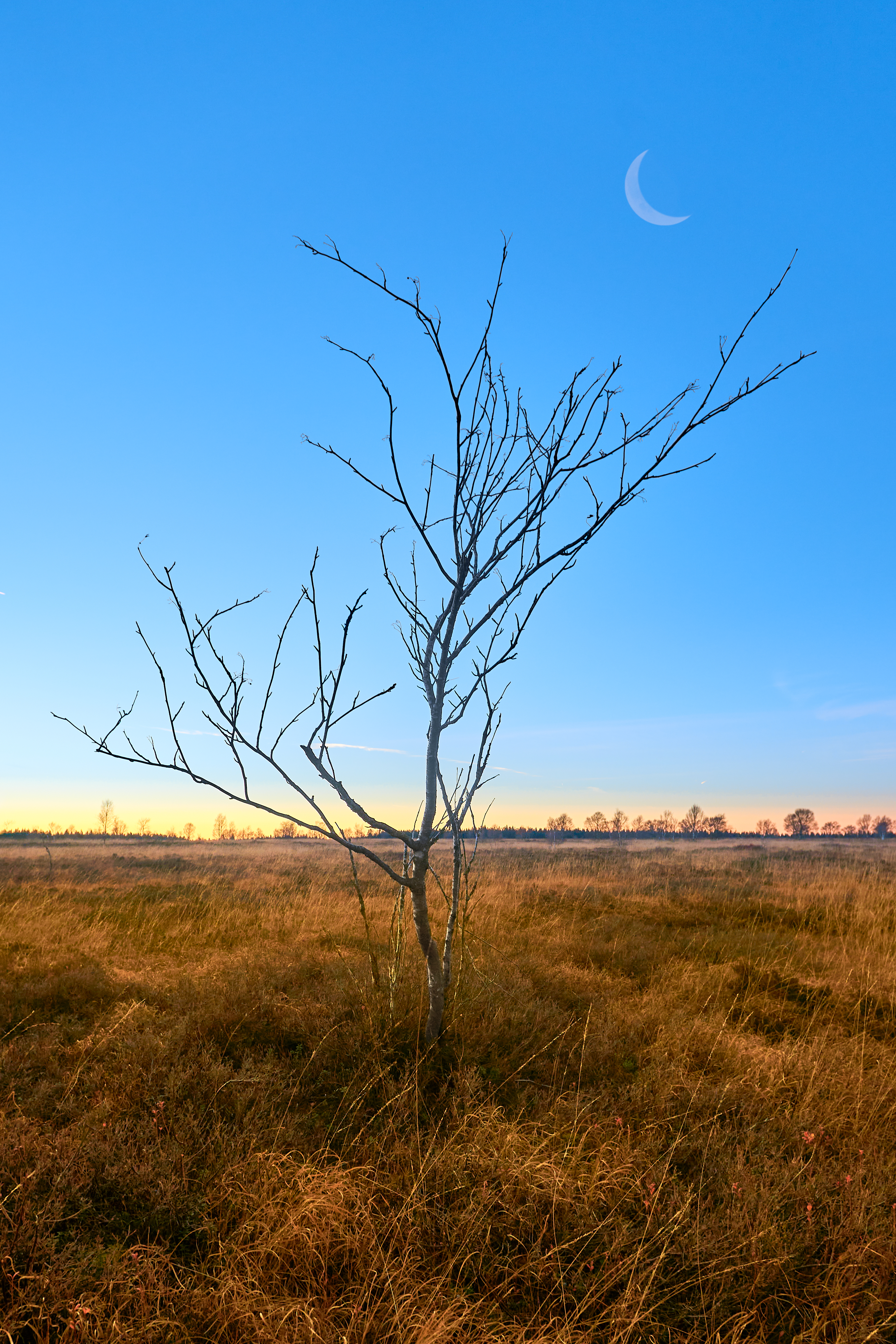
Birch in the Fens

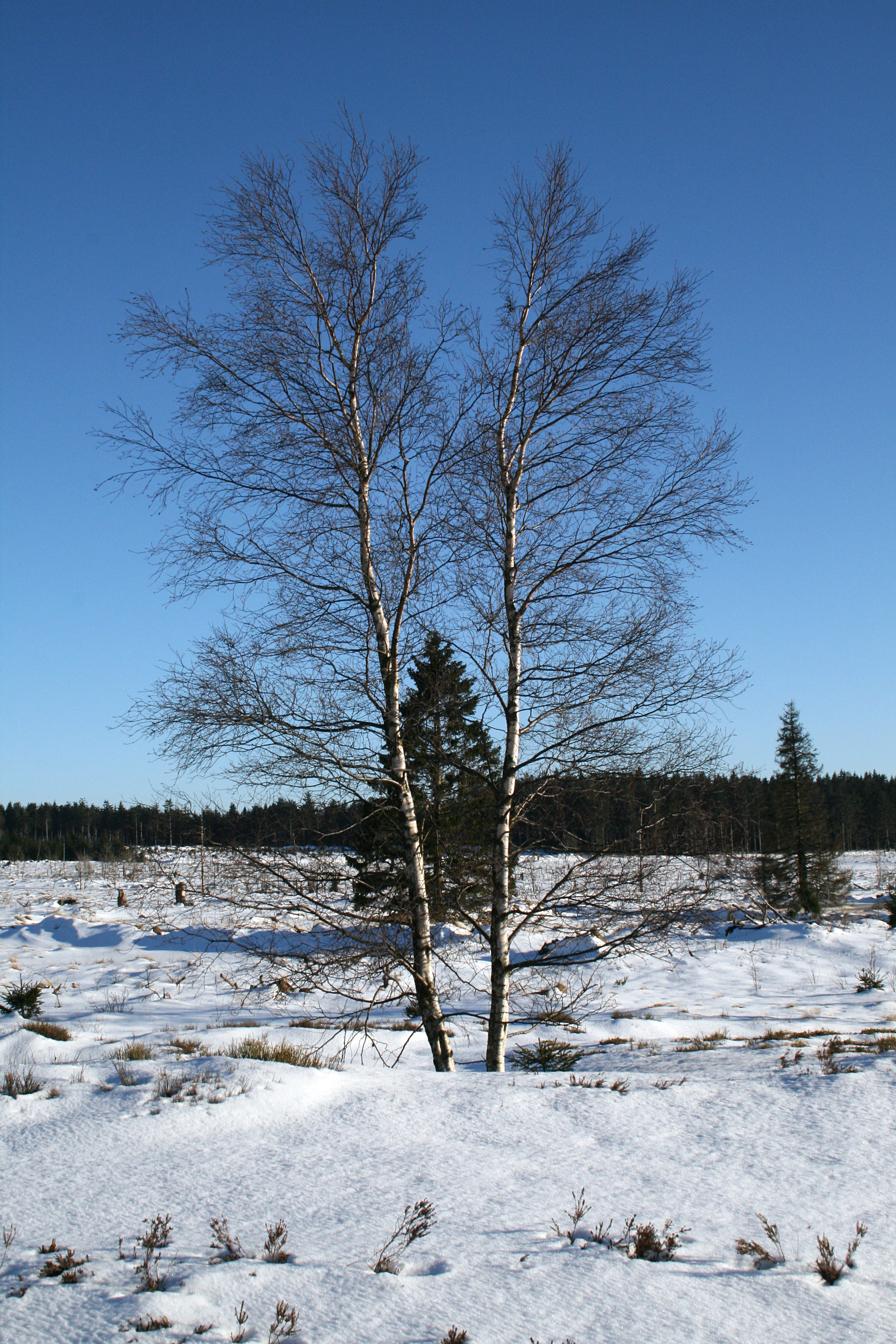
Birch and fir, the two most common trees of the High Fens

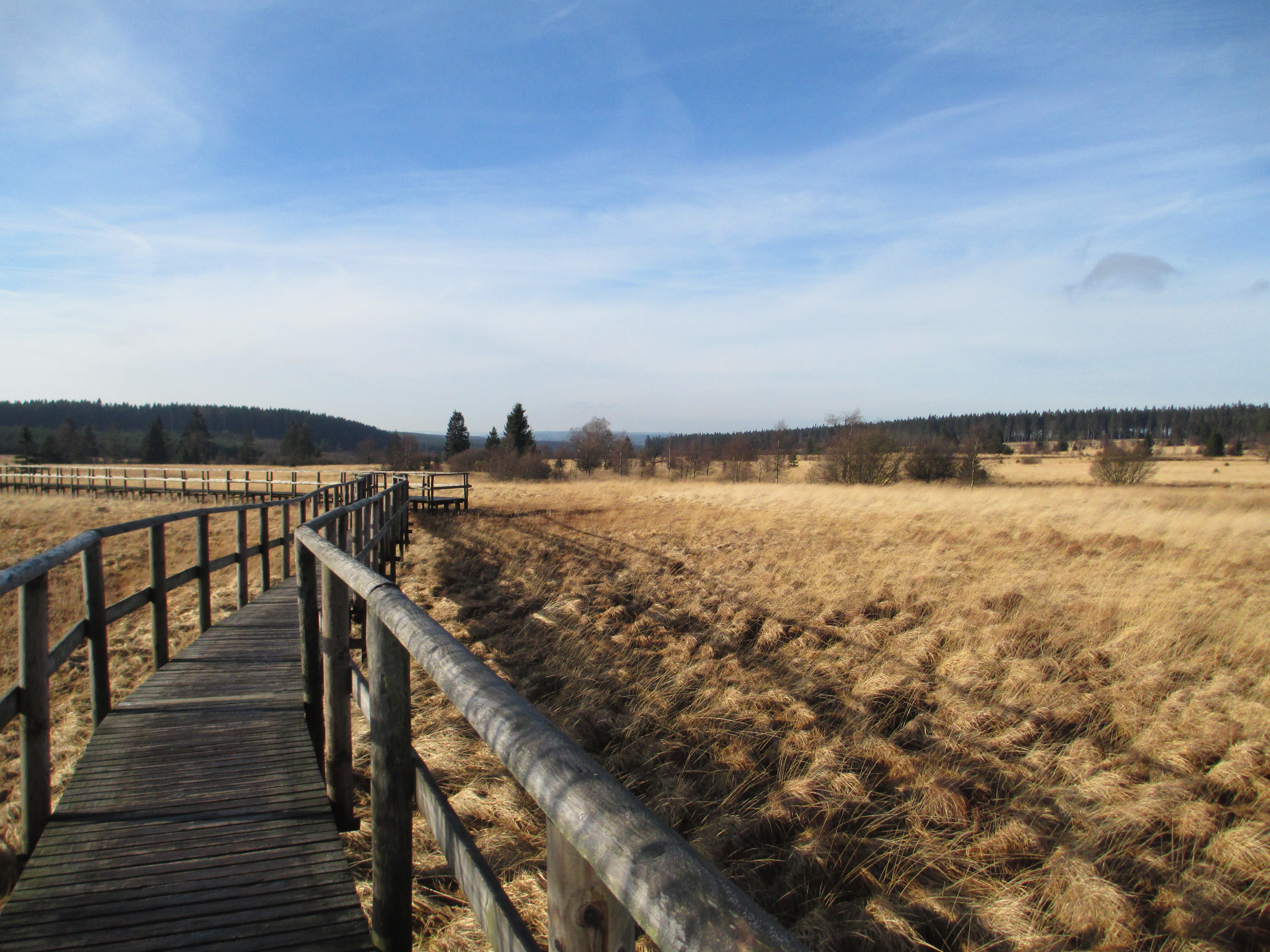
Boardwalk in the "Grande Fagne"

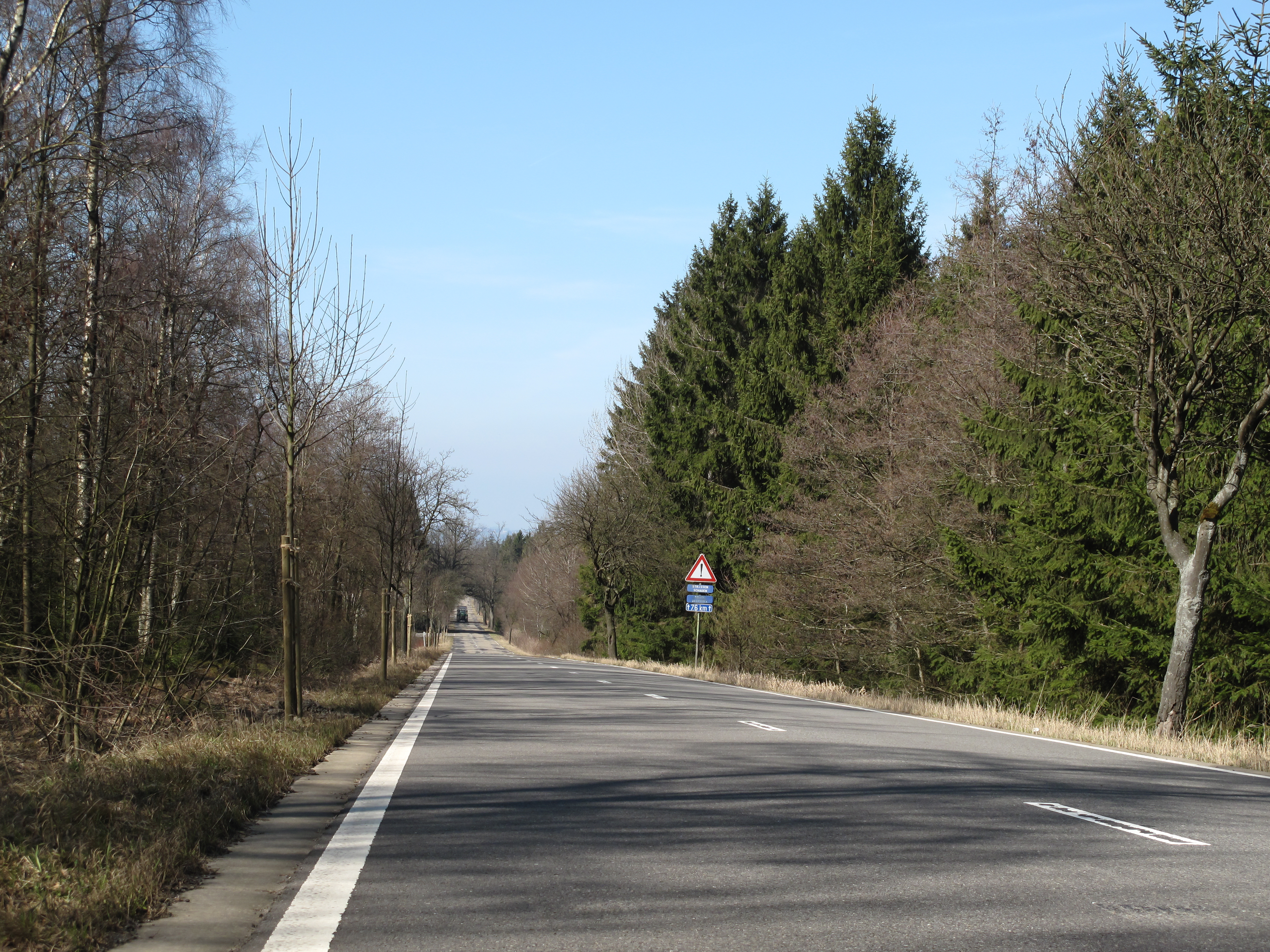
Road from Eupen to Mützenich

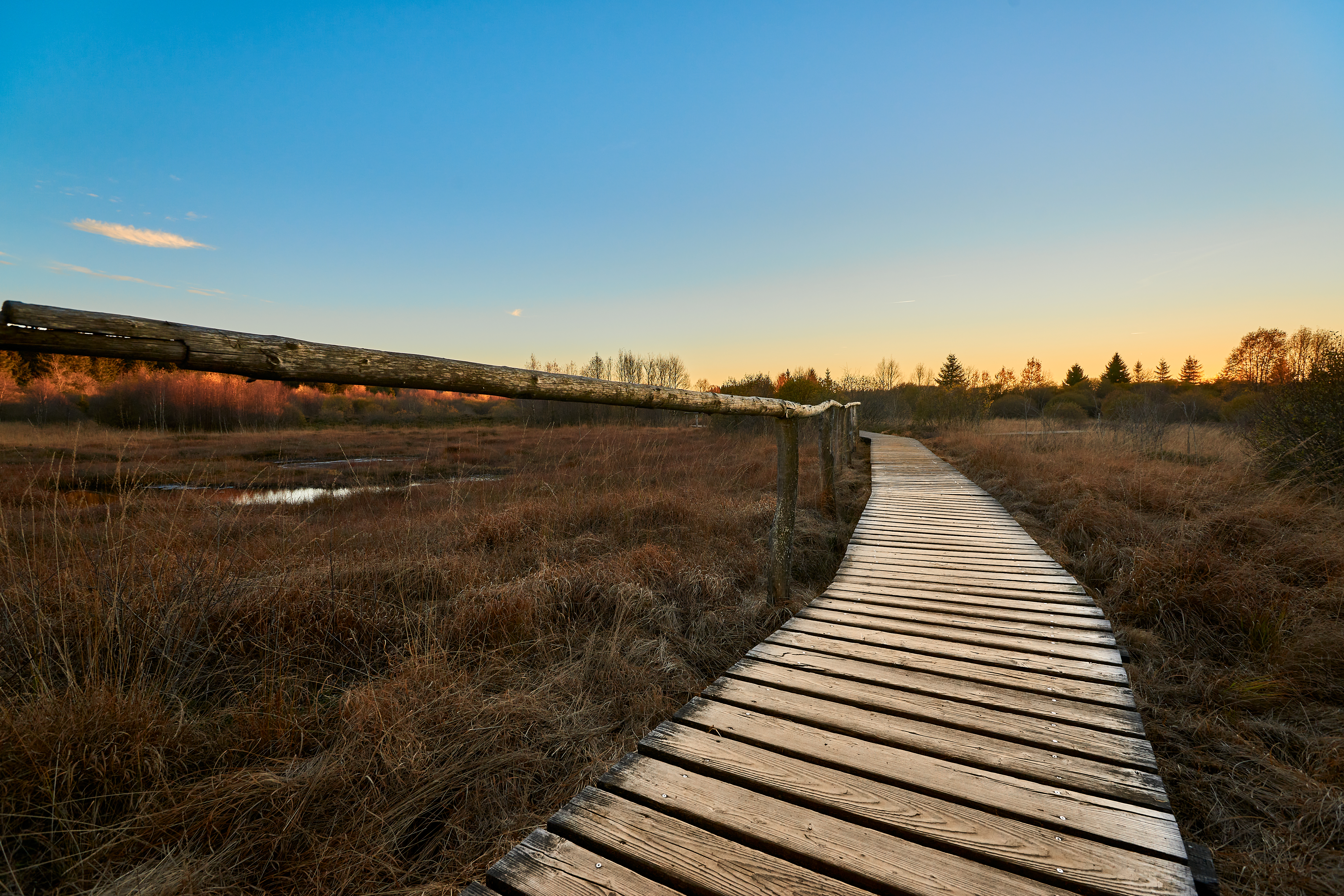
Boardwalk at sunset

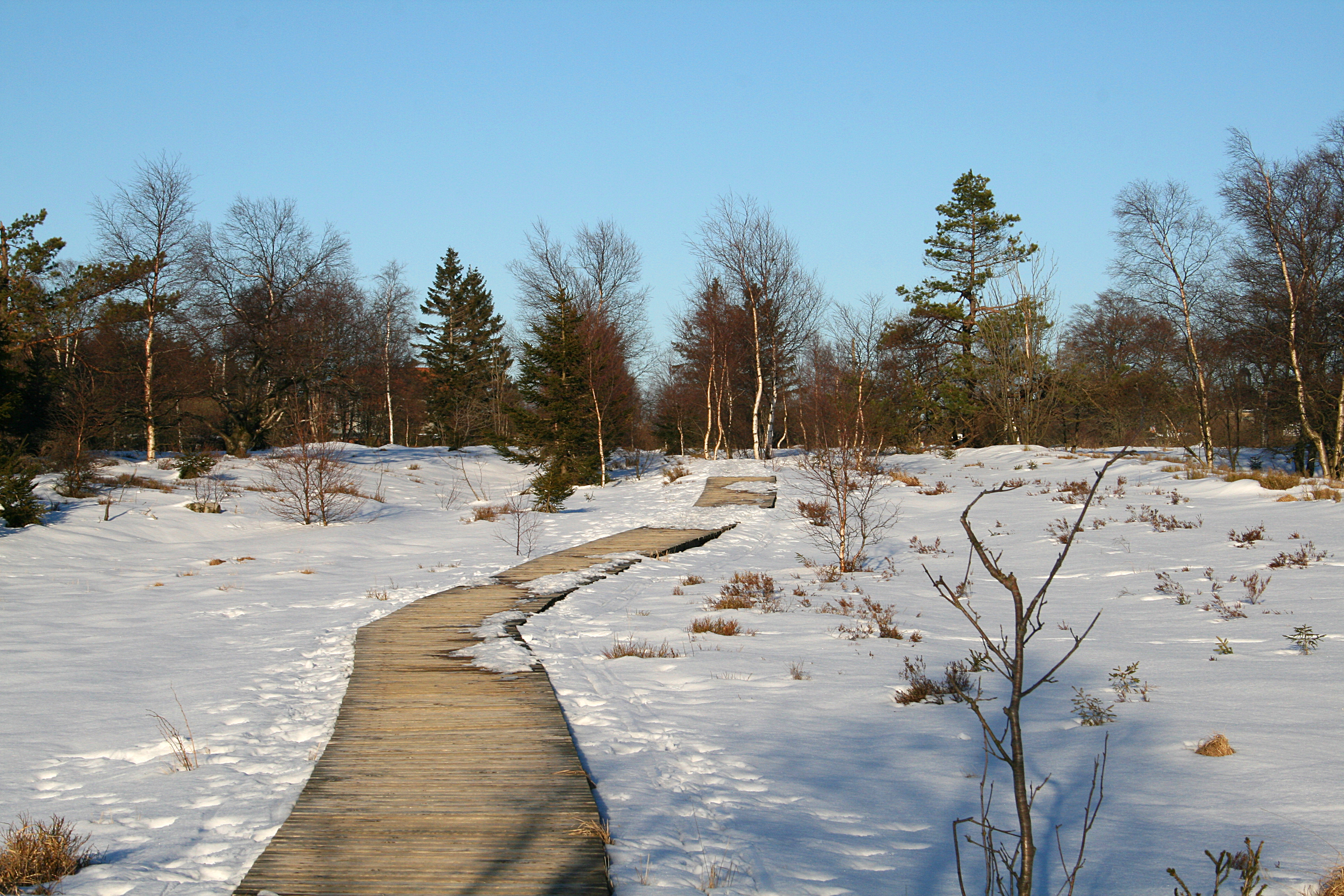
Boardwalk in the winter.
