= Vesdre =

River in Liège Province, Belgium

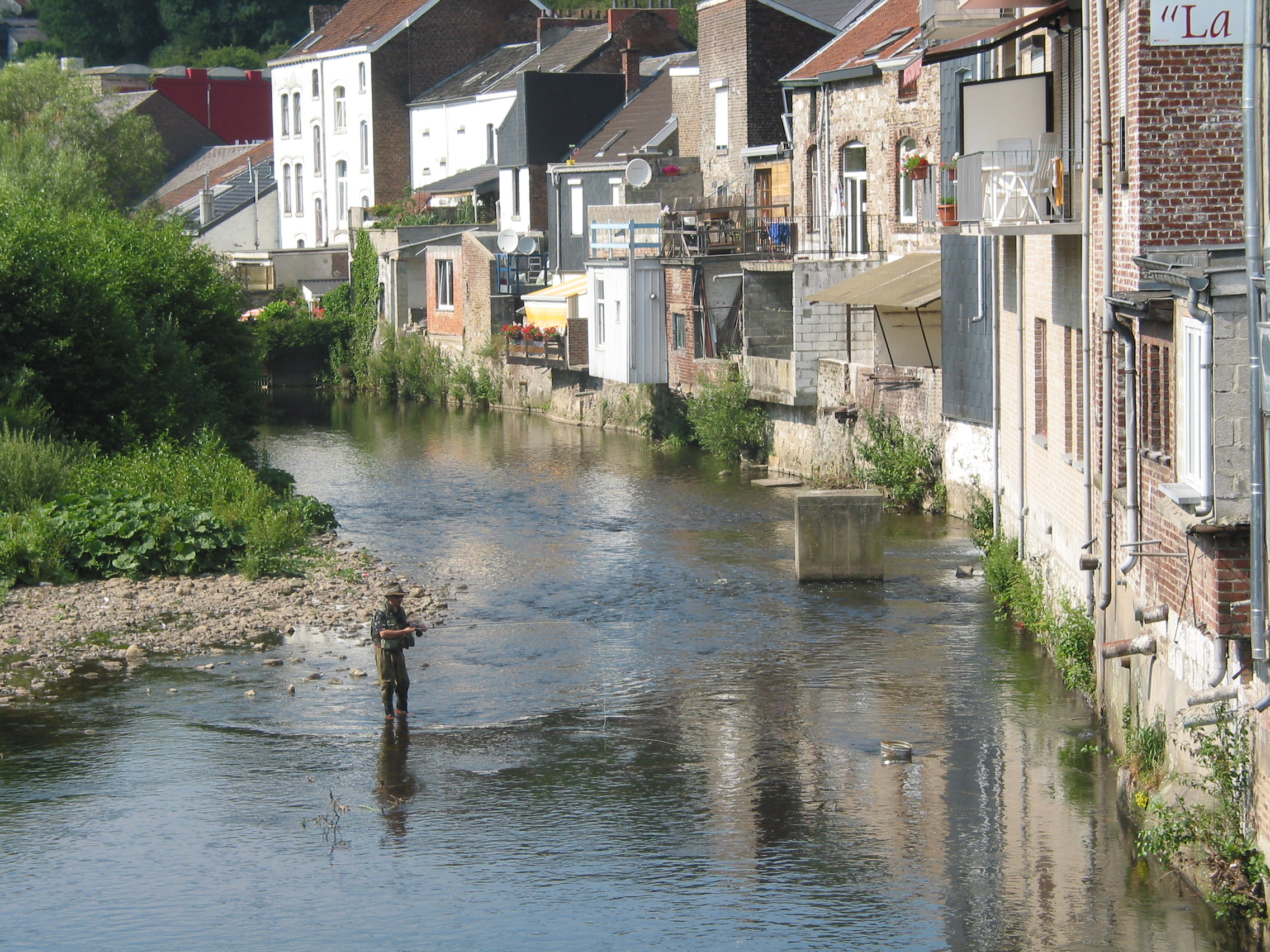
- Limbourg, angler in the Vesdre river

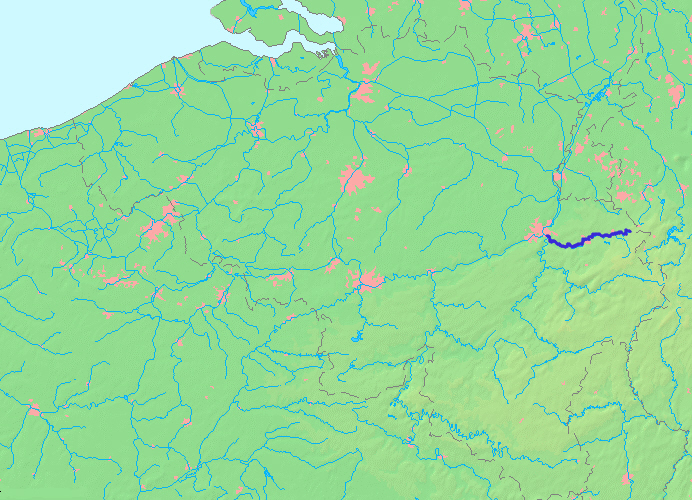
- Course of the Vesdre

Location
- Countries: Belgium and Germany

Physical characteristics
- Mouth
  - location: Ourthe
  - coordinates: 50.6116°N 5.6135°E
- Length: 63.7 km (39.6 mi)
- Basin size: 695 km^{2} (268 sq mi)

Basin features
- Progression: Ourthe→ Meuse→ North Sea
- Tributaries
  - left: Hill, Gileppe, Hoëgne

The Vesdre (French pronunciation: [vɛzdʁ]), Weser (German pronunciation: [ˈveːzɐ]) or Vesder (Dutch pronunciation: [ˈvɛzdər]) is a river in Liège Province, eastern Belgium.

== River ==
A few kilometres of the upper reaches also flow through the German municipality Roetgen and form part of the Belgian–German border. The Vesdre's total length is approximately 64 kilometres (40 mi). It is a right tributary to the river Ourthe. Its source lies in the High Fens (Hautes Fagnes, Hohes Venn, Hoge Venen), close to the border with Germany near Monschau. It flows through an artificial lake (Lake Eupen), and then through the towns of Eupen, Verviers, Pepinster and Chaudfontaine. The Vesdre flows into the Ourthe a few kilometres from Liège where the Ourthe in turn flows into the river Meuse.

The water of the Vesdre has a high acidity (due to the Hautes Fagnes bogs), which made it very suitable for the textiles industry around Verviers. The Vesdre was the far eastern end of the sillon industriel, the backbone of Walloon industry. Nowadays, the water of the Vesdre is mainly used as drinking water.
