= Jalhay =

Municipality in Liège Province, Wallonia, Belgium

Jalhay Djalhé (Walloon)
- Municipality
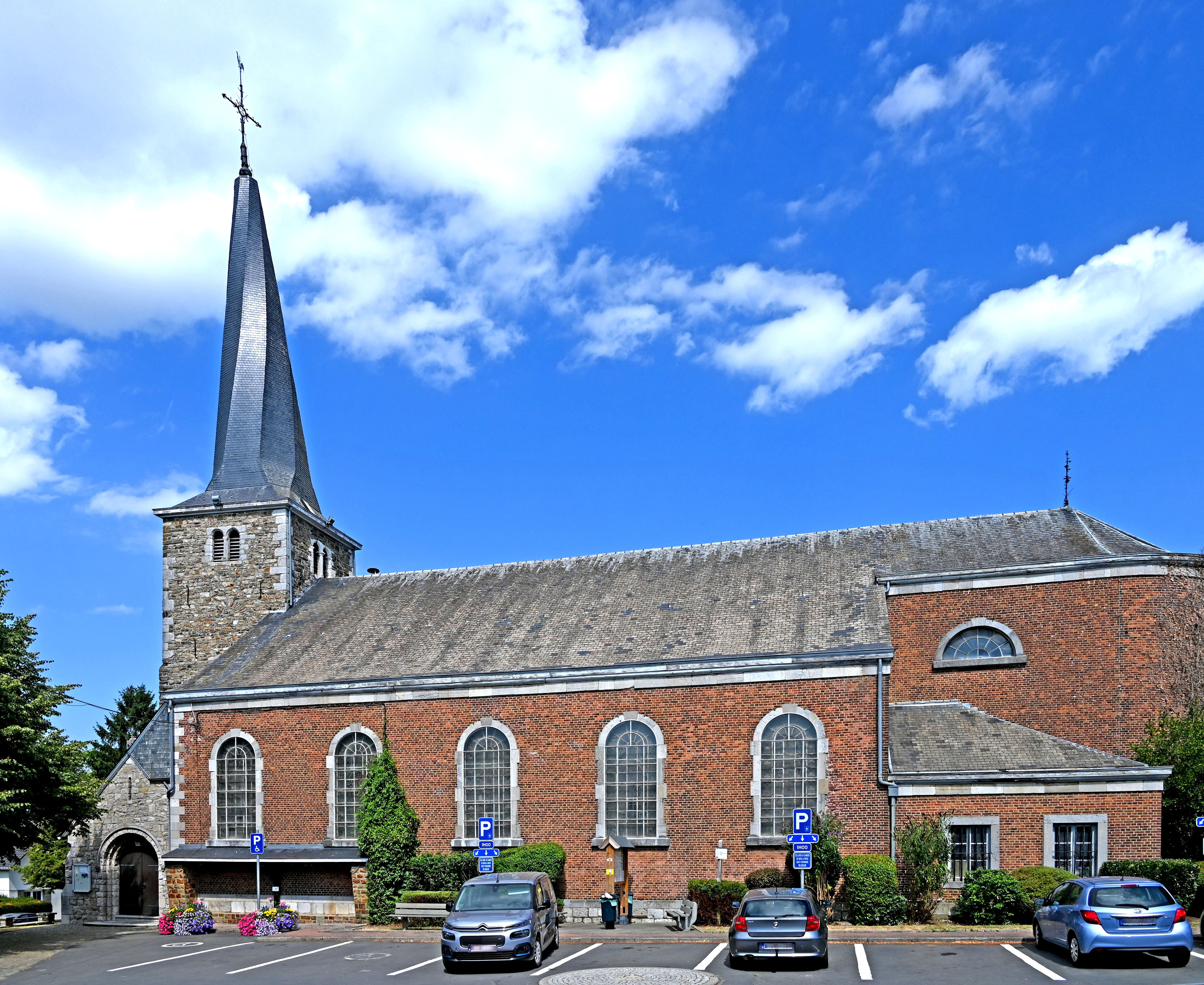
- The Saint Michael's church (twisted church tower).

- Flag Coat of arms

- Location of Jalhay in the province of Liège
- Interactive map of Jalhay
- Location in Belgium
- Coordinates: 50°34′N 05°58′E
- Country: Belgium
- Community: French Community
- Region: Wallonia
- Province: Liège
- Arrondissement: Verviers

Government
  - Mayor: Michel Fransolet (MR)
  - Governing party: MR/IC/EJS

Area
  - Total: 106.94 km^{2} (41.29 sq mi)

Population (2018-01-01)
  - Total: 8,590
  - Density: 80.3/km^{2} (208/sq mi)
- Postal codes: 4845
- NIS code: 63038
- Area codes: 087
- Website: www.jalhay.be

Jalhay (French pronunciation: [ʒalɛ]; Walloon: Djalhé) is a municipality of Wallonia located in the province of Liège, Belgium.

On 1 January 2006 Jalhay had a total population of 7,953. The total area is 107.75 km^{2} which gives a population density of 74 inhabitants per km^{2}.

The municipality consists of the following districts: Jalhay and Sart.

The highest point of the municipality is the Baraque Michel in the High Fens, at 674 metres (2,211 ft).

== See also ==
- List of protected heritage sites in Jalhay
