= Signal de Botrange =

Highest point in Belgium

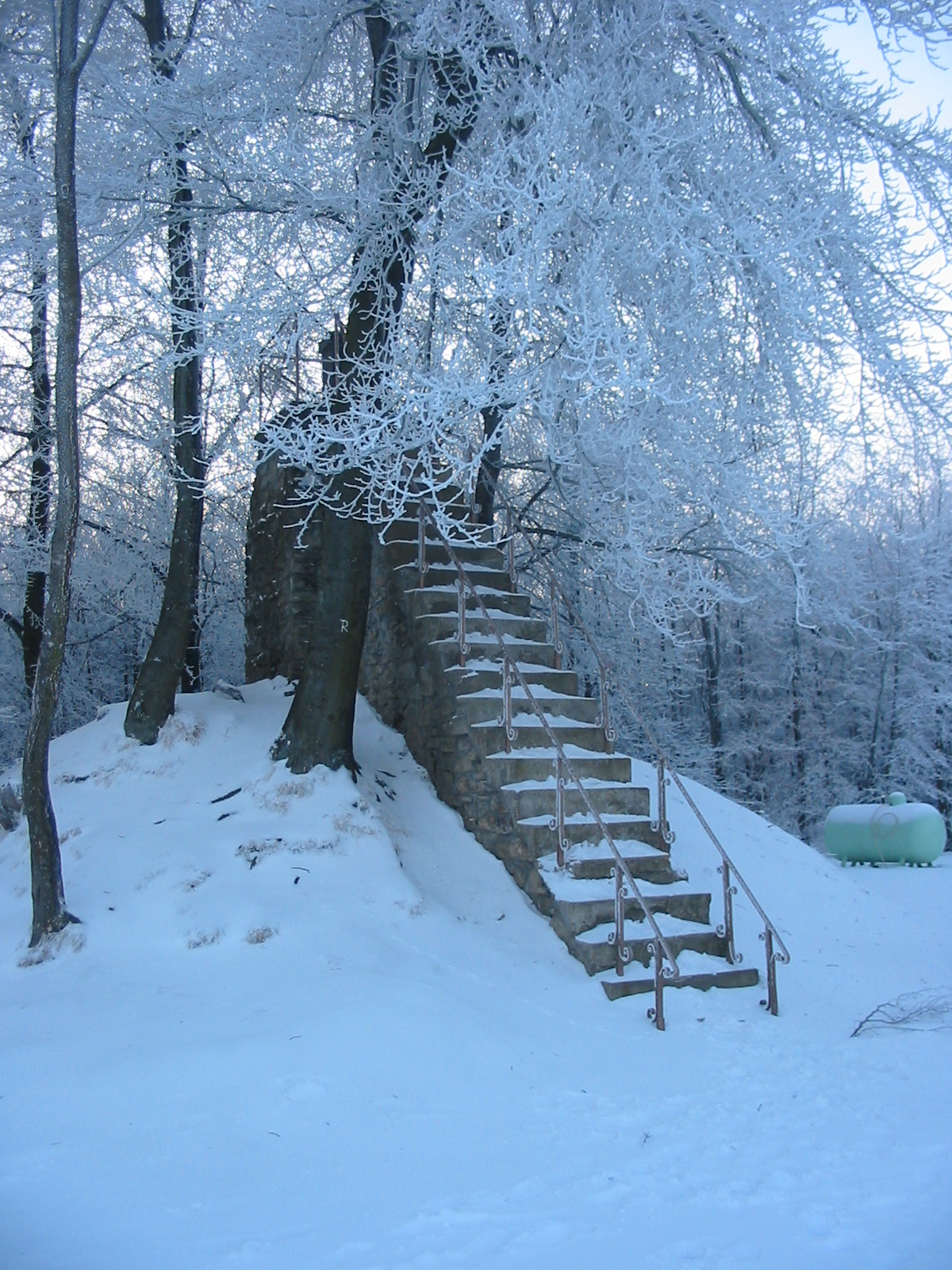
- The 6 m high tower at the Signal de Botrange

Highest point
- Elevation: 694 m (2,277 ft)
- Prominence: 119 m (390 ft)
- Listing: Country high point
- Coordinates: 50°30′06″N 6°05′34″E

Geography
- Location within Belgium
- Location: Liège Province, Wallonia, Belgium
- Parent range: Hautes Fagnes

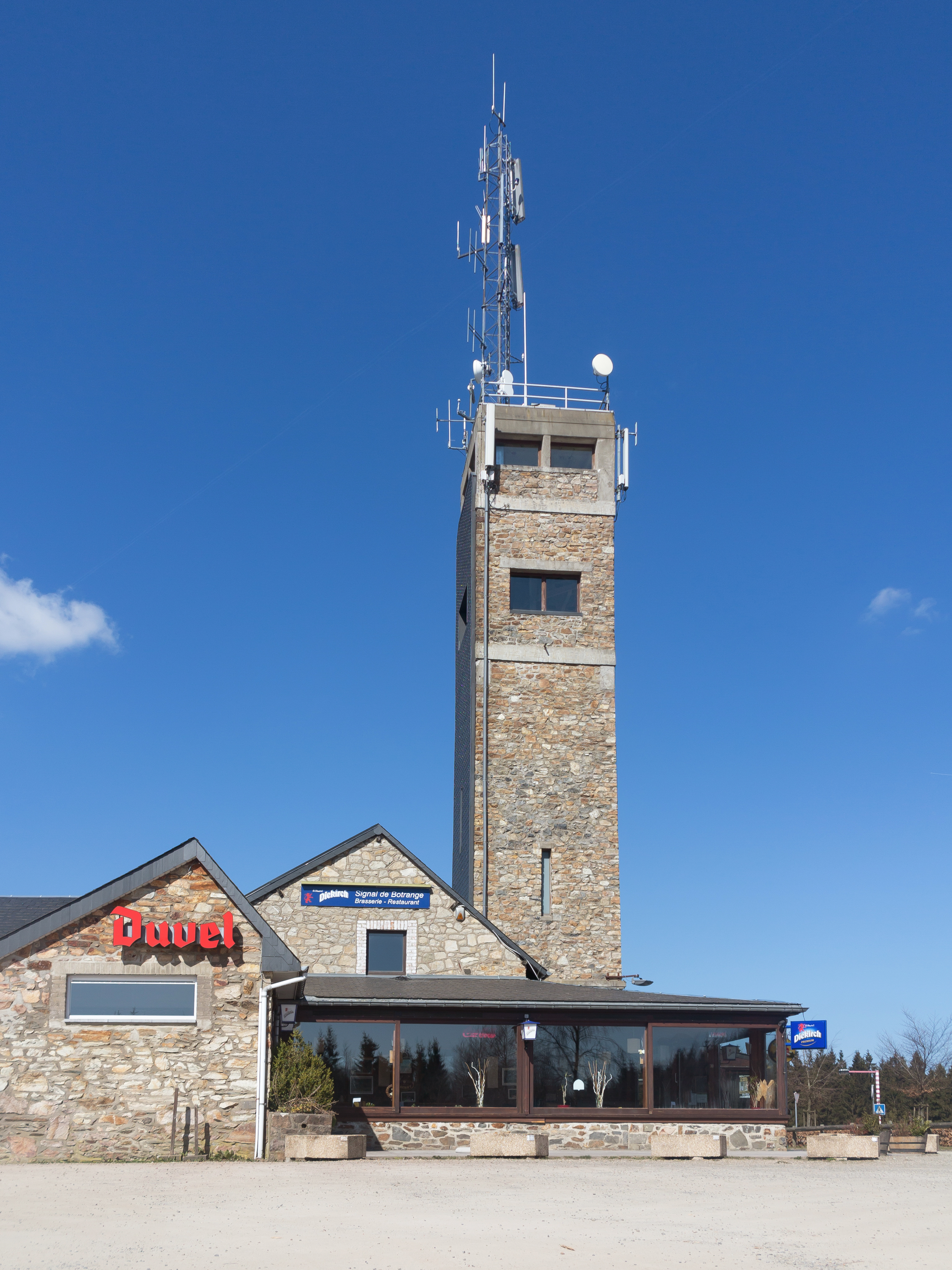
Communication tower on the Signal de Botrange

Signal de Botrange is the highest point in Wallonia and Belgium, located in the High Fens (Hautes Fagnes in French, Hohes Venn in German, Hoge Venen in Dutch), at 694 metres (2,277 feet). It is the top of a broad plateau and a road crosses the summit, passing an adjacent café. It is also the highest point in the Ardennes and in the European part of the Benelux.

For several decades a meteorological station was installed at Signal de Botrange. Since 1999, it was replaced by an automatic station of the Royal Meteorological Institute of Belgium installed on Mount Rigi (scientific station of the High Fens - University of Liège), which is between the Signal and Baraque Michel which was formerly the highest point in Belgium prior to the annexation of the Eastern Cantons in 1919.

The summit is also the site of a 6-metre (20 ft) observation tower, and a 50-metre (160 ft) data relay station, and is the watershed for a number of rivers flowing through the Ardennes region.

== Climate ==
Signal de Botrange experiences stronger winds than the centre of Belgium. Average and extreme temperatures are usually lower than at any other place in Belgium: the minimum temperature recorded (−25.6 °C [−14.1 °F]) does not, however, exceed the absolute record (−30.1 °C [−22.2 °F]), observed in the valley of the Lomme, at Rochefort during a temperature inversion. In winter, for three months, on average, the average temperature remains below 0 °C (32 °F).

Rainfall is much greater than most of the rest of the country, at an annual average of 1,450 mm (57 in) compared with 800 mm (31 in) in Uccle: there are over 200 days of precipitation per year (against just over 170 in Uccle). Maximum temperatures in summer rarely exceed 30 °C (86 °F). The number of days of frost is over 130 days per year and the number of days of snowfall exceeds 35 days. The maximum thickness of snow was measured on 9 February 1953, at 115 cm (45 in) of snow. Frost and early snowfall can occur in late September, but that is exceptional. Late snow may sometimes occur until mid-May.

At the height of winter the site is used as the start of a number of cross-country skiing routes.

== Towers and Transmitters ==
In 1923, the 6-metre (20-foot) Baltia tower was built on the summit to allow visitors to reach an altitude of 700 m (2,300 ft). A stone tower built in 1933/34 by François Fagnoul from Ovifat on the Botrange crowned a steel weather vane with the relieved name SICCO CAMPO until World War II. Meanwhile, the spire serves as transmitter of Radio Contact and reaches a de facto height of 718 m (2,356 ft).

In November 2013, at the Signal de Botrange, a 50-metre-high (160-foot) tower with parabolic antennas was agreed to provide data interchange by Microwave transmission between London Stock Exchange and Frankfurt Stock Exchange, because the data transmission via Communications satellite or fibre optic involves a small delay, which interferes the stock exchange trading. The data transfer takes place in real time via the intermediate station Botrange, which was set up directly next to the existing tower.

== Hydrography ==
The summit of Belgium is home on its flanks to several sources of Ardennes rivers, all belonging to the Mosan basin, including the Helle, Roer and Schwarzbach to the north (but flowing here to the east), Bayehon to the south, and the Trôs Marets to the west.

As in the names of these rivers, although the Signal de Botrange is not a state border, it marks a language border in the area between the Romance languages (south and west) and Germanic languages (north and east)
