= Moresnet (disambiguation) =

Moresnet or Neutral Moresnet is a former neutral territory existing from 1816 to 1920 in modern-day Belgium.

Moresnet may also refer to:

- Moresnet (village), in the municipality of Plombières, Belgium
- Neu-Moresnet, part of the municipality of Kelmis
