= Moresnet (village) =

- Village
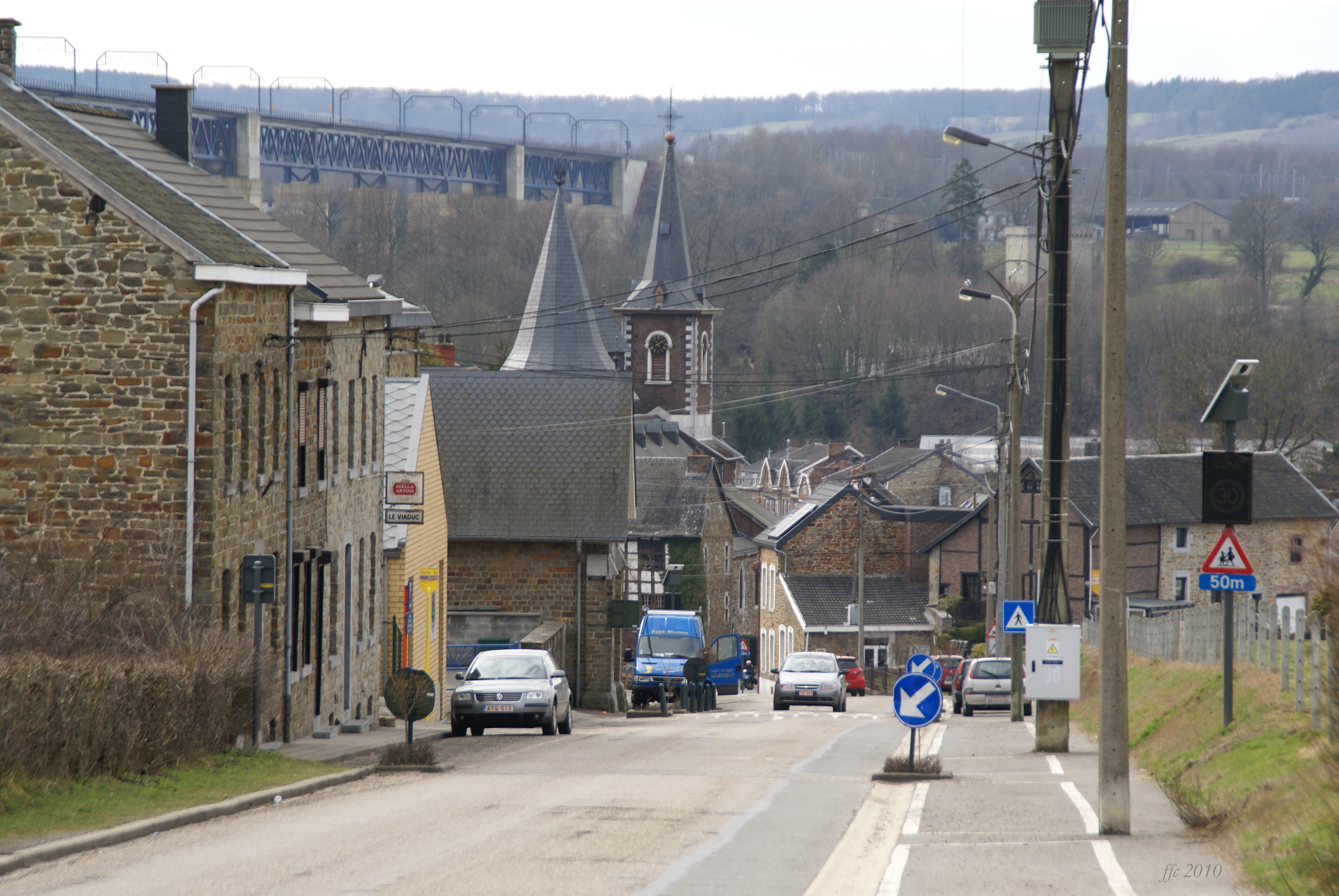
- The village of Moresnet with the viaduct in the background

- Location in Belgium
- Coordinates: 50.7198°N 5.9844°E
- Country: Belgium
- Region: Wallonia
- Province: Liège
- Municipality: Plombières
- Time zone: CET

Moresnet is a village and sub-municipality of Plombières in the province of Liège, Wallonia, Belgium. It was originally a German speaking village. Nowadays French is the official language.

== History ==
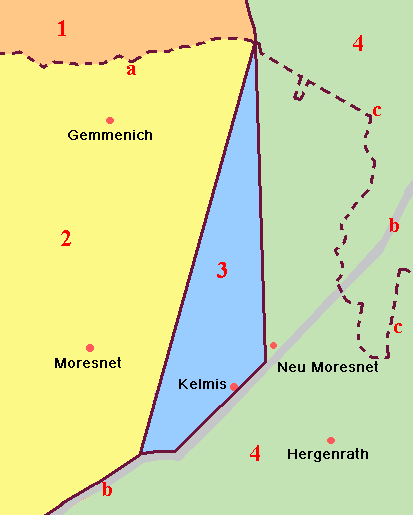
The Moresnet region (1830–1914): Netherlands (1); Belgium (Liège) (2); Neutral Moresnet (3); Prussia (Lower Rhine) (4)

Originally there were two villages in the area: Moresnet and Kelmis. In 1794, the area was conquered by Napoleon, and the villages became part of the Moresnet municipality. In 1806, Jean-Jacques Dony received permission to look for zinc. Dony founded the Vieille Montagne mine in the municipality, and became Europe's largest producer of zinc.

In 1815, after the defeat of Napoleon, the borders of Europe were redrawn at the Congress of Vienna. The United Kingdom of the Netherlands and Kingdom of Prussia could not reach an agreement about the ownership of the zinc mine. In 1816, a compromise was reached at the Aachen Treaty: the village of Moresnet was awarded to the Netherlands, Kelmis and the zinc mine became Neutral Moresnet, a Dutch–Prussian condominium, and the remainder was awarded to Prussia as Prussian-Moresnet. In 1830, Belgium became an independent country, and the village of Moresnet became part of Belgium.

On 28 June 1919, all three parts were awarded to Belgium by the Treaty of Versailles, and Prussian-Moresnet was renamed Neu-Moresnet. The treaty came into effect in 1920. In 1940, Belgium was invaded by Nazi-Germany who merged Moresnet, Kelmis, Neu-Moresnet, and Hergenrath into Amt Moresnet as an integral part of Germany. In 1944, the villages were returned to Belgium.

Moresnet remained an independent municipality until 1977 when it was merged into Plombières.

== Sights ==
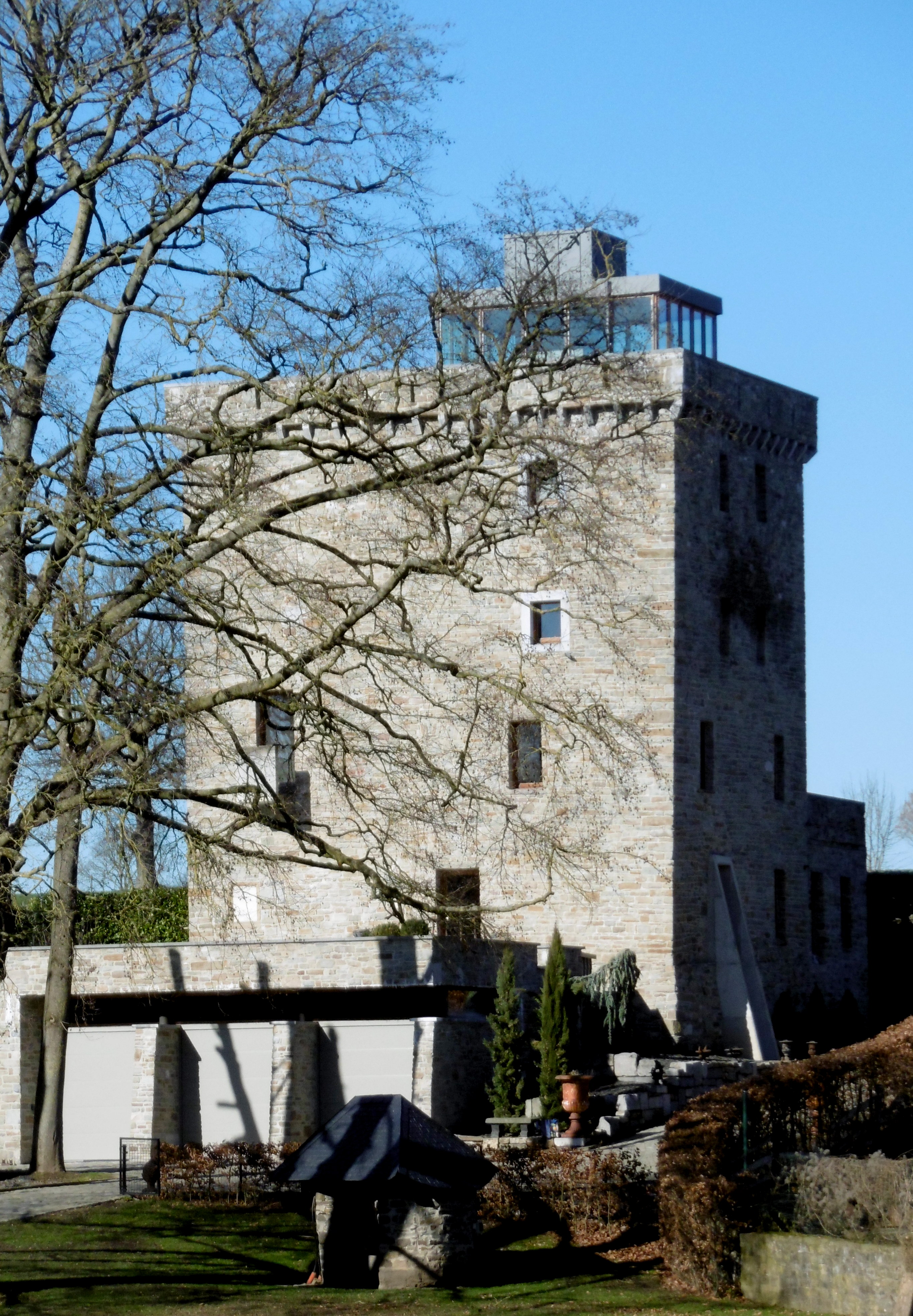
Castle Alsenberg

Castle Alsenberg is located in the valley of the Geul. The burg dates from the 15th century, and the farmhouses were built in the 17th century. The castle was built for Jean d'Alensberg. During World War II, the castle was severely damaged, and parts have been demolished. A five stories high donjon with walls of 180 cm thick, has remained.

The Viaduct of Moresnet is a railway viaduct constructed in 1915/16 to transport troops and artillery to the front line. It was constructed by Russian prisoners of war. It is 1,107 metres (3,632 ft) long and passes over the valley of the Geul. The viaduct was destroyed twice during World War II, but is still in use by freight trains to Germany and Eastern Europe.

== Notable people ==
- Arnold Timothée de Lasaulx (1774–1863), Belgian politician, first Mayor of Neutral Moresnet.
- Bouli Lanners (born 1965), Belgian actor, author and film director.
- Heintje Simons (born 12 August 1955), Dutch schlager singer and actor. He lives at Château Schimper.
