= Wilhelm Kyll =

6th Mayor of Neutral Moresnet
- In office 29 March 1915 – 7 December 1918
- Preceded by: Hubert Schmetz
- Succeeded by: Pierre Grignard

Personal details
- Born: Wilhelm Kyll; 1876 Germany
- Died: 1956

Wilhelm Kyll (1876–1956) was a German politician who served as the Mayor of Neutral Moresnet from 29 March 1915 until 7 December 1918.

== Life ==
Wilhelm Kyll was town clerk (Stadtsekretär) in Wittlich (1900-1907) and Linz am Rhein (1907-1910), before he became the mayor of Hergenrath and the administrator of the county mayoralty (Landbürgermeisterei) of Prussian-Moresnet.

Germany appointed Kyll as the mayor of Neutral Moresnet on 29 March 1915, which followed the German invasion of Belgium in 1914. The Kingdom of Prussia formally annexed Neutral Moresnet on 27 June 1915, although the annexation never received international recognition.

In November 1918, the Armistice between France and Germany forced Germany to withdraw from Belgium and Neutral Moresnet. This led to the ouster of Mayor Kyll. He was replaced by Pierre Grignard on 7 December 1918.

At the end of 1919, Kyll ceased to be mayor of Hergenrath, which became part of Belgium upon the Treaty of Versailles. He then was mayor of Birgel from 3 November 1919 to 19 March 1933, when he was forced to retire by the National Socialists.

Preceded by Hubert Schmetz	Mayor of Moresnet; 1915 – 1918	Succeeded by Pierre Grignard
