= Wilhelm Molly =

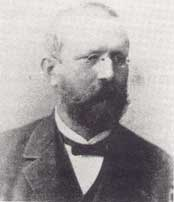
- Wilhelm Molly
- Born: 1838; Blasbach, Wetzlar
- Died: 1919 (aged 80–81); Neutral Moresnet
- Occupation: Doctor
- Known for: Philately

Wilhelm Molly (1838–1919) was a doctor, philatelist, activist, and Esperantist.

He was the chief medical doctor of the Vieille Montagne mining company.

As an avid philatelist, he tried to organize a local postal service with its own stamps. This enterprise was quickly thwarted by Belgian intervention.

In 1908, Molly proposed to make Neutral Moresnet the world's first state with Esperanto as its official language, named Amikejo (lit. Place of Friendship).

== See also ==
- History of Esperanto

== Bibliography ==
- Robelin, Cyril (2021). "Un étranger inventeur de nation: le cas du docteur Wilhelm Molly à Moresnet‑Neutre". Sociétés Plurielles (in French) (4). doi:10.46298/societes-plurielles.2021.8406.
