= Pierre Grignard =

7th Mayor of Neutral Moresnet
- In office 7 December 1918 – 10 January 1921
- Preceded by: Wilhelm Kyll
- Succeeded by: Position dissolved

1st Mayor of Kelmis
- In office 10 January 1921 – 7 February 1923
- Preceded by: Position established

Personal details
- Born: Pierre Grignard Belgium

Pierre Grignard was a Belgian politician who served as the last Mayor of Neutral Moresnet from 1918 until 1921, when the territory was dissolved and annexed by Belgium as part of the Treaty of Versailles. Grignard subsequently served as the first mayor of the Belgian municipality of Kelmis until 1923.

== Life ==
Grignard, while serving as a council member in Liège, took office as mayor of Neutral Moresnet on 7 December 1918, less than a month after the signing of the Armistice between France and Germany, which forced Germany to withdraw from Belgium and Neutral Moresnet and led to the ouster of Mayor Wilhelm Kyll, a German national.

On 28 June 1919 the Treaty of Versailles settled the dispute that had created the neutral territory a century earlier by awarding Neutral Moresnet, along with Prussian Moresnet and the German municipalities of Eupen and Malmedy, to Belgium. The treaty became effective on 10 January 1920, ending both Grignard's term as mayor and the existence of Neutral Moresnet, which became the Belgian municipality of Kelmis.

Despite the change, Grignard effectively stayed in office and became the first mayor of Kelmis. The 10 members of Neutral Moresnet's council were confirmed for the Kelmis municipal council after its Prussian members renounced their nationality. They remained in office until the election of a new municipal council on 7 February 1923.

Preceded by Wilhelm Kyll	Mayor of Moresnet; 1918 – 1920	Succeeded by Position dissolved
