= Lasaulx =

Lasaulx is a surname, and may refer to:

- Arnold Timothée de Lasaulx (1774–1863), Mayor of Moresnet
- Arnold von Lasaulx (1839–1886), geologist
- Ernst von Lasaulx (1805–1861), philologist
