= Hammer Bridge =

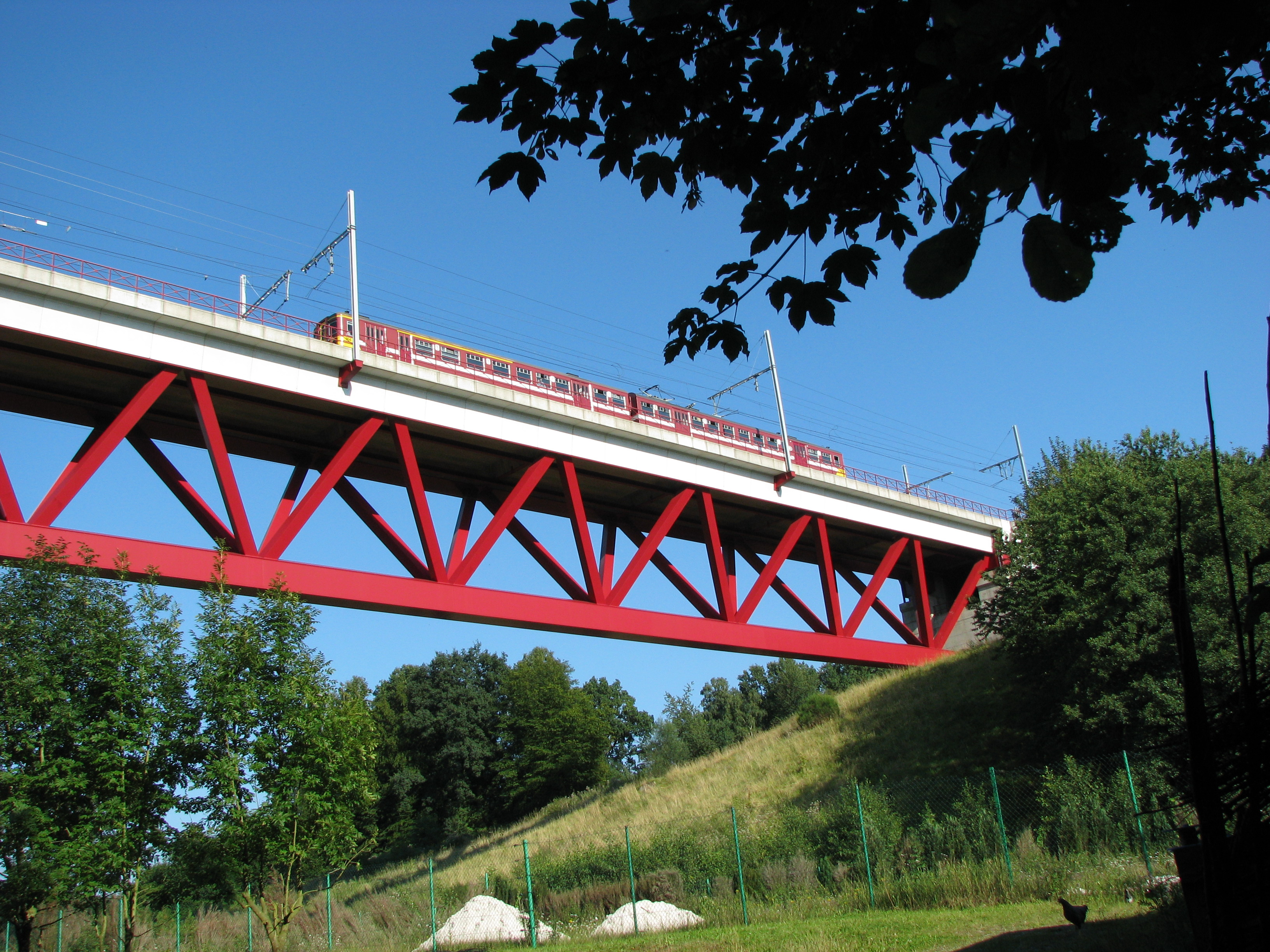
- The current Hammer Bridge at (Hergenrath)(1999)
- Coordinates: 50°42′12.4″N 6°2′49.6″E
- Carried: Twin Track electrified railway line
- Crossed: Geul valley
- Official name: Hammerbrücke/

Characteristics
- Design: double viaduct (1841-1940) two two section truss bridges (1940-2009) one twin track two section truss bridge (2009 to date)
- Material: >8 million bricks (1843-1940) steel and concrete (1940 to date)
- Total length: 220 metres (722 ft) (2009)
- No. of spans: 17 (1843 bridge); 2x2 (1940, 1945, 1948 bridges 2 (2009 bridge)

History
- Construction start: 1841
- Construction end: 1843
- Opened: 1843
- Collapsed: 1940, 1944 blown up by soldiers

The Hammer Bridge is a 220 metres (722 ft) long railway bridge on the Weser Valley line crossing the Geul valley a few hundred meters to the south of Hergenrath.

Today it is in the German speaking part of Belgium. Before frontier changes mandated in 1919 shifted the frontier between Belgium and Germany approximately 36 km (23 miles) along the railway line in a southerly direction the bridge was in Germany. Back in 1841 when work started on the first railway bridge at this point, it was located in the Rhine Province of Prussia.

The bridge was replaced twice, most recently in 1997/99 in order to take the extra weight of the new high-speed train route into which the bridge has now been incorporated.

== History ==
=== The first bridge 1843-1940 ===
The Hammer Bridge is part of the railway line constructed in the 1840s to link the rapidly industrialising Ruhr region in western Prussia with the recently constructed Belgian rail network. The bridge was designed by Chief Construction Director G. Moller from Darmstadt, and construction onsite was managed by Engineer F. Wittfeldt. Work began in 1841 on a double viaduct, entirely of brick construction, across the River Geul The lower half of the viaduct consisted of 13 arches, placed above which were 17 similarly sized arches, of which two at each end were placed on low abutments rather than arches. Until 1897 the Hammer Bridge was the highest railway viaduct in what had, by that time, become the unified German state.

The bridge was sited directly to the south of Hergenrath and 5 km (3 miles) to the north of the point where in the world's first international frontier railway station would open, in 1843, at Herbesthal. It was also in 1843, on 15 October, that the first train crossed the Hammer Bridge, en route from Aachen to Hergenrath. Just two days later a train ran through from Aachen to Verviers in Belgium: Verviers already had a rail connection to Liège, so that from 17 October 1843 the bridge could fill its role connecting the industrial regions of Prussia and Belgium. This bridge was 206.5 metres (677 ft) long between abutments and 8.47 metres (28 ft) wide. It was 37.7 metres (124 ft) above the river, which here corresponded with the valley's deepest point. Construction of the viaduct used more than 8 million bricks and cost 2.5 million Prussian Thalers.

During the First World War the railway network was at the heart of Germany's Lightning war strategy to attack France through Belgium. After the war on the western front staggered to a military stalemate, the cross border Hammer Bridge route incorporating the Hammer Bridge remained critical both for supplying fresh troops and munition to the western front, and for the return home of casualties and exhausted troops. In 1915 work began on a second route across the frontier with Belgium, crossing the Geul a few kilometres to the west at Moresnet, in order to make the logistics of the military operation less vulnerable to congestion at and around the old frontier station at Herbesthal. After the war ended in 1918, the victorious powers imposed a frontier change whereby Eupen-Malmedy, a strip of land between Aachen and Luxembourg, was transferred from Germany to Belgium. The amount of land involved was only 1,036 km² (roughly 5% of the size of Wales, or less than half the size of Long Island) but it included the piece of mainline railway incorporating the Hammer Bridge, which would be strategically vital in the event of any future war involving a German attempt to invade Belgium by rail. The Hammer Bridge was now in Belgium.

=== Destruction and provisional repairs 1940 - 1999 ===
Invasion came again on 10 May 1940, the date on which, for Belgians, the Second World War broke out. On the night of 9/10 May Belgian troops blew up a section of the viaduct. There have been suggestions that the soldiers involved used too much explosive, since ten of the twelve men who undertook the work were killed in the explosion. Nevertheless, the German invasion went ahead, relying not so much on rail transport as on motor vehicles, and during more than four years of military occupation that ensued the German army were quickly able to render the crossing usable again, using a truss bridge parallel to the remains of the viaduct, employing Russian prisoners of war accommodated at a prisoner camp nearby to provide the necessary labour. The single track bridge proved insufficient, however, and work started on a parallel arrangement using truss bridge sections linking from the stubs of the destroyed viaduct to a massive concrete pillar placed on the valley floor between the two extremities. The second bridge became operational in time for September 1944. On 12 September 1944 the bridge was blown up again, this time by the retreating German army, keen to impede the advance of Anglo-American forces.

The gap blown in the viaduct by the German army in 1944 was wider than the gap blown in it by the Belgian army in 1940. Nevertheless, the bridge remained important for delivering strategic supplies and it was repaired by the US army. This time the repair lasted till 1948. The replacement structure of 1948 was again regarded as an interim solution, though this time it was a solution that would last for fifty years. The idea of rebuilding the old elegant brick viaduct was rejected on cost grounds. Nevertheless, ends of the viaduct remained structurally dependable. The large concrete pillar was retained at the midpoint between the two surviving subs of the viaduct and new single track truss bridge sections were mounted between the residual stubs and the central pillar, while a second parallel "temporary" single track truss bridge took advantage of the other concrete pillar originated by the German army in the 1940s.

=== New bridge 2009 ===
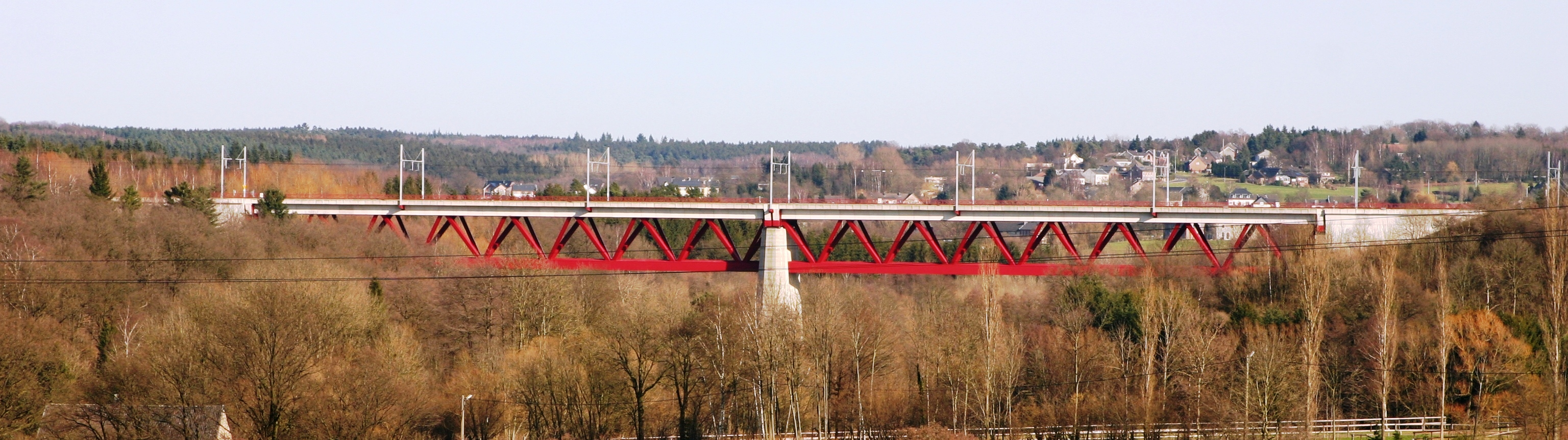
The view from the west

The existing arrangements were found to be insufficient for safe operation of the High-speed train to be introduced (after much delay) in 2009 to connect Liège and Aachen, and in order to prepare for the new high speed passenger service a new bridge was constructed between 1997 and 1999. The bridge is not dedicated only to High-speed trains, being shared with the existing Weserthal line, and subject to a 160 km/h (100 mph) speed limit. Work started in 1995 with an upgrade to the existing westbound single track bridges which would be used for traffic in both directions during the main construction phase. In January/February 1998 the steel structure of the east bound line was lifted out of position using cranes and broken up on site before being taken away by truck. Also in February 1998, the central pillar that had supported the eastbound bridge was blown up with 200 tons of dynamite, and during the next few days the surviving arches from the end sections of old 1841 bridge were also blown up. In March 1998 work started on the new central concrete pillar which would support the new twin track bridge, and on the new abutment at the northern end. The 100-metre-long (328 ft) steel truss bridge structure from the northern end to the central pillar was then assembled and mounted. In Autumn/Winter 1998/99 the southern abutment was constructed: the southern 100 m long truss bridge was mounted, and a concrete slab was placed over the steel structure to accommodate the rail tracks. During the summer of 1999 a single track was initially laid on one side of the new bridge. The remaining westbound bridge was now closed and the track removed from it, to be relayed on the other side of the new bridge. The new bridge was commissioned in July/August 1999 after which the second of the 1948 bridges was destroyed. Its last remnant, the concrete central pillar, was scheduled for destruction in September 1999.
