= Oskar Anton Bilharz =

Mayor of Neutral Moresnet (c. 1831–1917)

4th Mayor of Neutral Moresnet
- In office 7 February 1882 – 20 June 1885
- Preceded by: Joseph Kohl
- Succeeded by: Hubert Schmetz

Personal details
- Born: Oskar Anton Bilharz c. 1831
- Died: 1917

Oskar Anton Bilharz was Mayor of Neutral Moresnet, a small neutral territory, from 7 February 1882 until 20 June 1885.

== Life ==
Bilharz became mayor of Neutral Moresnet on 7 February 1882, succeeding Joseph Kohl to become the territory's fourth mayor. As mayor, Bilharz served as the territory's head of state, alongside two commissioners, one each from the Kingdom of Prussia and Belgium.

During his term as mayor, in 1883, Neutral Moresnet switched its territorial flag to one with a tricolore with horizontal bars in black, white and blue. The reason for the change is unclear. Bilharz was succeeded by Hubert Schmetz on 20 June 1885.

Bilharz died in 1917, when he was about 86 years old.

Preceded by Joseph Kohl	Mayor of Neutral Moresnet; 1882 - 1885	Succeeded by Hubert Schmetz
