= Neu-Moresnet =

Neu-Moresnet Prussian-Moresnet
- Village
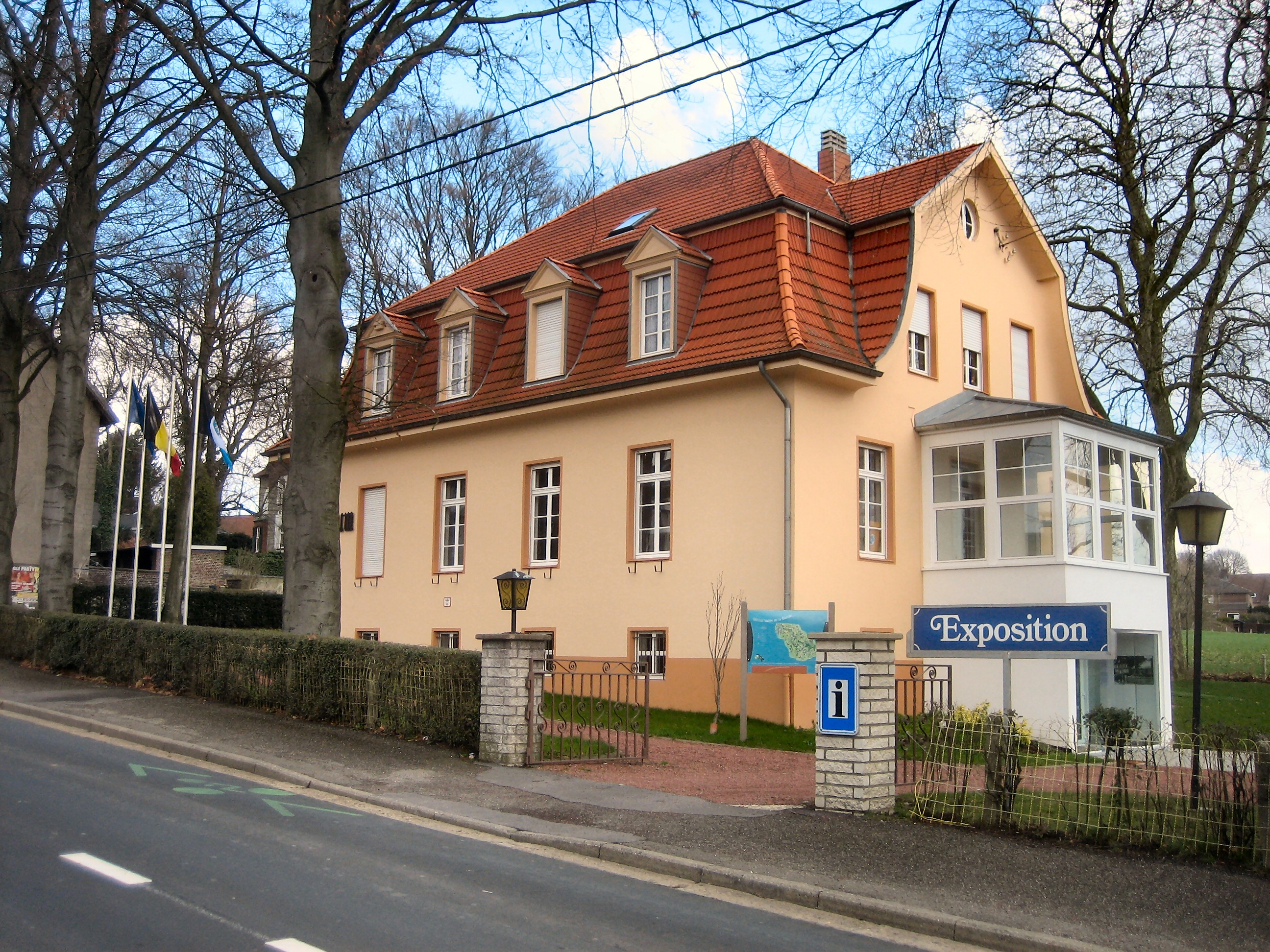
- Göhltal Museum

- Location in Belgium
- Coordinates: 50.7190°N 6.0239°E
- Country: Belgium
- Community: German-speaking Community of Belgium
- Region: Wallonia
- Province: Liège
- Municipality: Kelmis
- Time zone: CET

Neu-Moresnet (German pronunciation: [nɔʏˈmɔʁəsnɛt], lit. 'New Moresnet') is a village and sub-municipality of Kelmis in the German-speaking community of the province of Liège, Wallonia, Belgium. The village was founded as Prussian-Moresnet (German: Preußisch-Moresnet) as part of the Lower Rhine Province. In 1919, after World War I, it was awarded to Belgium, and renamed Neu-Moresnet. In 1940, it was annexed by Nazi Germany, and in 1944, it was returned to Belgium. Neu-Moresnet was an independent municipality until 1977 when it was merged into Kelmis.

== History ==
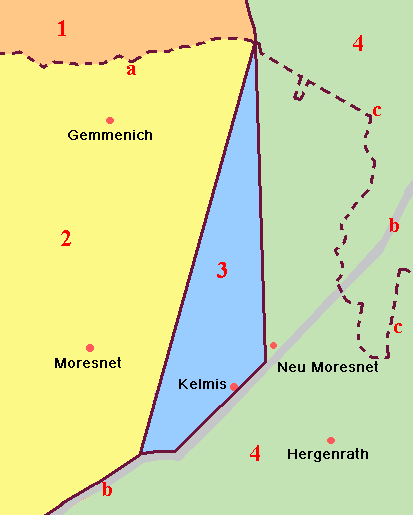
The Moresnet region (1830–1914): Netherlands (1); Belgium (Liège) (2); Neutral Moresnet (3); Prussia (Lower Rhine) (4)

Originally there were two villages in the area: Moresnet and Kelmis. In 1794, the area was conquered by Napoleon, and the villages became part of the Moresnet municipality. In 1806, Jean-Jacques Dony received permission to look for zinc. Dony founded the Vieille Montagne mine in the municipality, and became Europe's largest producer of zinc.

In 1815, after the defeat of Napoleon, the borders of Europe were redrawn at the Congress of Vienna. The United Kingdom of the Netherlands and Kingdom of Prussia could not reach an agreement about the ownership of the zinc mine. In 1816, a compromise was reached at the Aachen Treaty: the village of Moresnet was awarded to the Netherlands, Kelmis and the zinc mine became Neutral Moresnet, a Dutch–Prussian condominium, and the remainder was awarded to Prussia as Prussian-Moresnet. In 1830, Belgium became an independent country, and the village of Moresnet became part of Belgium.

On 28 June 1919, all three parts were awarded to Belgium by the Treaty of Versailles, and Prussian-Moresnet was renamed Neu-Moresnet. The treaty came into effect in 1920. In 1940, Belgium was invaded by Nazi-Germany who merged Moresnet, Kelmis, Neu-Moresnet, and Hergenrath into Amt Moresnet as an integral part of Germany. In 1944, the villages were returned to Belgium.

Neu-Moresnet remained an independent municipality until 1977 when it was merged into Kelmis.

Neu-Moresnet is home to the Göhltal Museum which is dedicated to the political and historical peculiarities of the Moresnet region as well as minerals and flora of the region.
