= Adolf Hubert van Scherpenzeel-Thim =

2nd Mayor of Neutral Moresnet
- In office 21 February 1859 – 30 May 1859
- Preceded by: Arnold Timothée de Lasaulx
- Succeeded by: Joseph Kohl

Personal details
- Born: Adolf Hubert van Scherpenzeel-Thim; 1824
- Died: 1877

Adolf Hubert van Scherpenzeel-Thim (1824 – 1877) was Mayor of Neutral Moresnet, a small neutral territory, from 21 February 1859 until 30 May 1859. Having served less than 4 months, he was the territory's shortest-serving mayor.

Preceded by Arnold Timothée de Lasaulx	Mayor of Neutral Moresnet; 1859	Succeeded by Joseph Kohl
