= Joseph Kohl =

3rd Mayor of Neutral Moresnet
- In office 1 July 1859 – 7 February 1882
- Preceded by: Adolf Hubert van Scherpenzeel-Thim
- Succeeded by: Oskar Anton Bilharz

Personal details
- Born: Joseph Kohl c. 1831
- Died: 1917

Joseph Kohl was Mayor of Neutral Moresnet, a small neutral territory, from 1 July 1859 until 7 February 1882.

| Preceded by Adolf Hubert van Scherpenzeel-Thim | Mayor of Neutral Moresnet; 1859 – 1882 | Succeeded by Oskar Anton Bilharz |
