= Viaduct of Moresnet =

Viaduct of Moresnet Geul Valley bridge
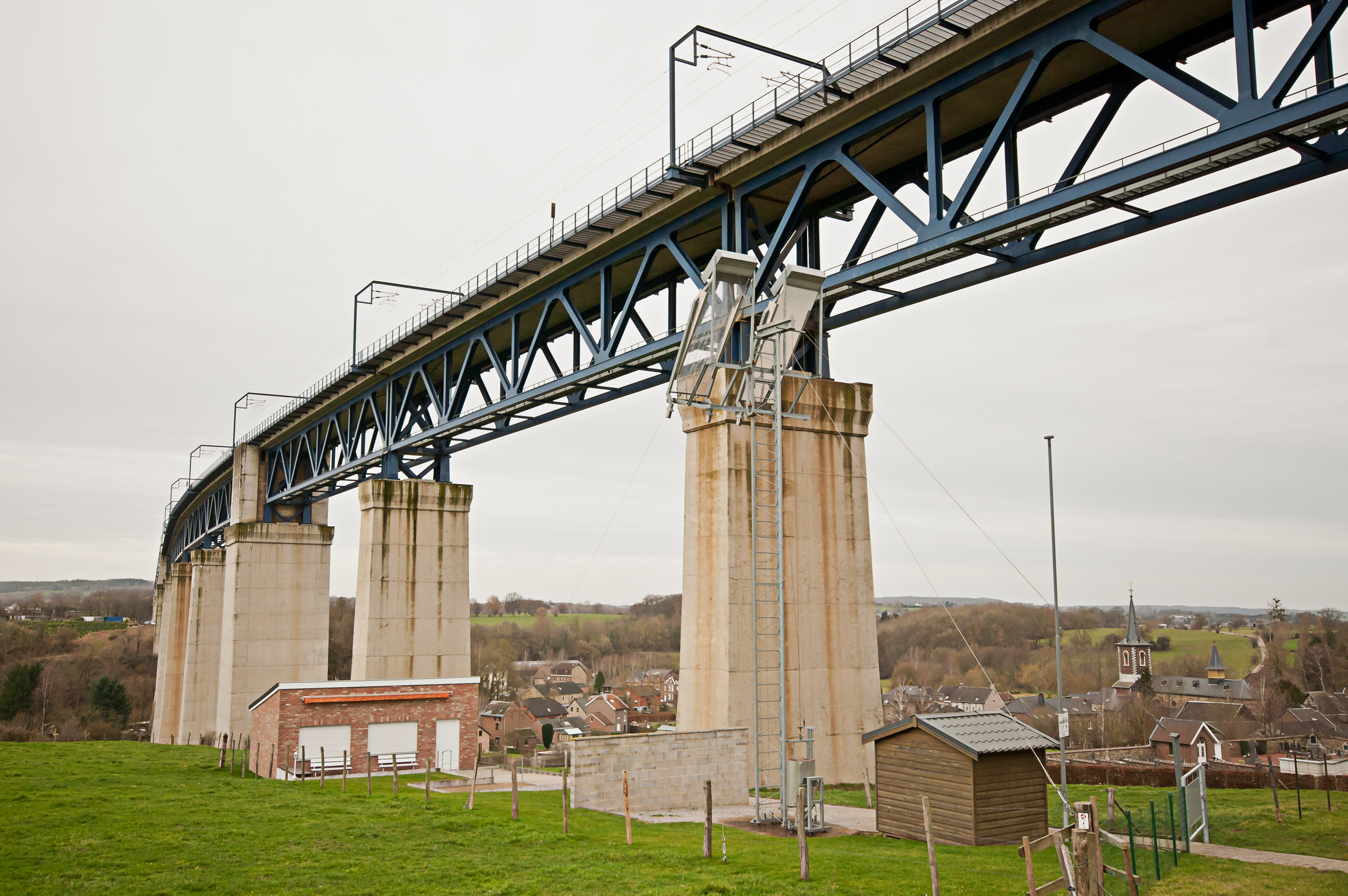
- The Geul Valley bridge viewed from the southeastern side
- Coordinates: 50°43′7″N 5°58′57″E
- Carried: Twin Track electrified railway line (line 24: Aachen West - Visé - Tongeren (Antwerp))
- Crossed: Geul valley
- Official name: Viaduc de Moresnet (French); Göhltalviadukt (German); Viaduct van Moresnet (Dutch)

Characteristics
- Material: Steel and concrete
- Total length: 1,107 metres (3,632 ft)
- No. of spans: 22

History
- Construction start: 1915
- Construction end: 1916
- Opened: 1916
- Collapsed: 1940, 1944 blown up by soldiers

Location
- Interactive map of Viaduct of Moresnet; Geul Valley bridge

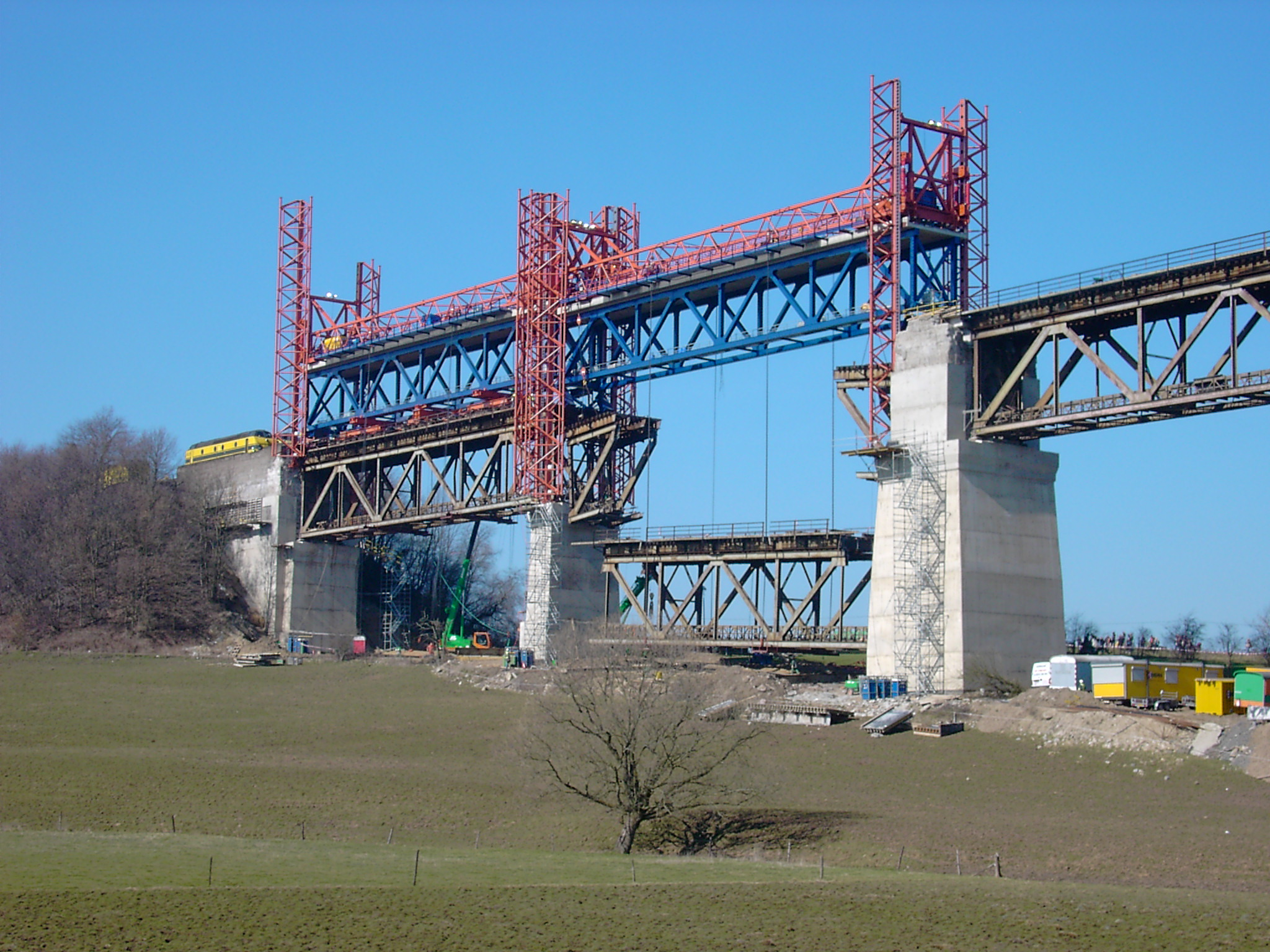
Replacing the bridge-deck. The most westerly section was lifted into place in March 2003.

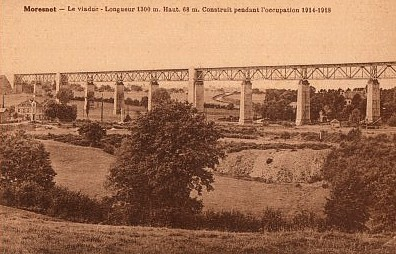
Viaduct of Moresnet (ca 1918)

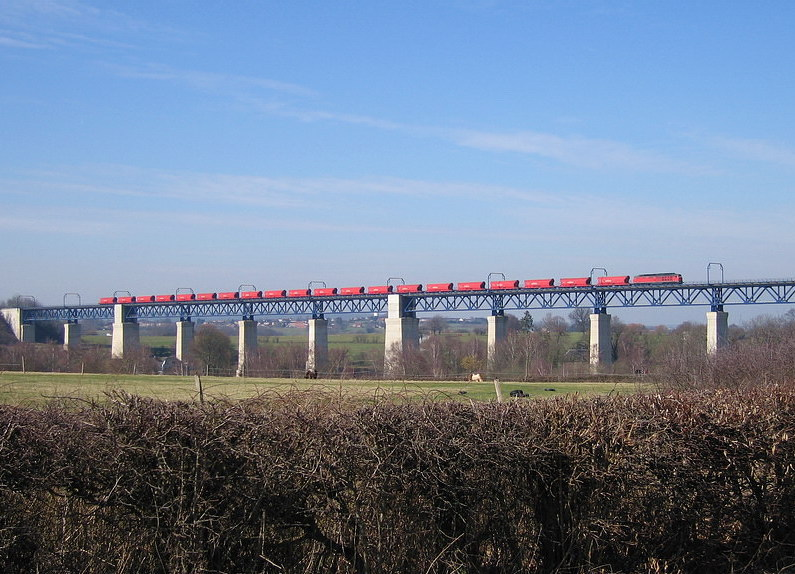
Viaduct of Moresnet (2006)

The Viaduct of Moresnet, also known as the Geul Valley bridge, is a railway bridge above and on the southern side of the village of Moresnet, within the municipality of Plombières, Province of Liège, close to the three-way Belgian frontier with Germany and the Netherlands.

The bridge crosses the Geul Valley. It is a Truss bridge with a maximum height above the valley floor of around 52 metres (171 ft) and a length of 1,107 metres (3,632 ft). Viewed from a horizontal plane the railway line at this point has a gradient of 1.8‰. Viewed from above, approximately a quarter of the bridge is on a slight bend: this has a radius of 1,600 metres (5,249 ft)

The Geul Valley bridge was built during the First World War, at a time when, since 1914, Belgium had been under German military occupation. It was built to support the strategic objective of being able to move troops and artillery rapidly between Aachen and Antwerp. More recently, by the 1990s it had fallen into such disrepair that trains crossing it were restricted to a maximum speed of 20 km/h (12 mph). During the early years of the twenty-first century, however, the bridge was extensively reconstructed and restored.

== Structure ==
The bridge comprises 22 twin track bridge-deck sections together with two abutments at the ends. The deck sections are supported by five stone support pillars and sixteen tamped concrete pillars, manufactured using a technique that was new at the time of the viaduct's construction.

Each bridge-deck section is 48 metres (157 ft) long and weighs approximately 260 tons. The combined length of the 22 sections is 1,107 metres (3,632 ft). If the lengths from the ends of the abutments to the first pillar at each end is added, the total length becomes 1,153 metres (3,783 ft). Before the construction of the high speed line connecting Brussels to Paris, the Viaduct of Moresnet was listed as Belgium's longest rail bridge. Five of the support pillars are thicker and stronger than the others in order to accommodate the additional stresses caused by trains braking or accelerating.

The Montzen line, of which the Geul Valley bridge is part, was designed for military transport and has subsequently been used as a freight route. The gradients in the region mean that heavier trains on this stretch of the line frequently use two locomotives. It is the extra traction cost resulting from the use of a second locomotive that usually persuades operators to send the heaviest trains along alternative routes.

== History ==
=== Construction ===
The bridge was erected during the German occupation, under the directions of the occupying forces. It was part of the so-called Montzen line designed to provide an alternative relatively unimpeded rail route for the speedy transfer of supplies to the western front across the high ground marking the pre-war border between Germany and Belgium. The existing mainline route, a short distance to the east, via Herbesthal, was becoming increasingly congested through sheer volume of traffic. The old frontier crossing at Herbesthal railway station itself was the channel through which more than 70,000 Belgian forced labourers passed, and it also became the unintended home and nursing centre for thousands of stranded war casualties. Work on the Geul Valley bridge started early in 1915 and was completed in October 1916, although the full "Montzen line" rail route opened for through traffic only in 1917. The companies involved in the construction were, principally, Dyckerhoff & Widmann, MAN Werk Gustavsburg Grün & Bilfinger and Gutehoffnungshütte. Under the wartime conditions of the time, forced labourers from Belgium, Germany, Italy, Hungary, Croatia and Russia were used for the work along with Russian prisoners of war, many of whom were at that time interned in the nearby "Val de Vie" camp.

=== Destruction and repairs ===
For Belgium war returned on 10 May 1940 with another invasion from Germany. A week later, on 18 May, a Belgian "Cyclistes Frontière" battalion blew up a section of the viaduct. Under German occupation the bridge was repaired and again rendered usable before the end of 1940. In 1944 it was the German army that destroyed large parts of the bridge during their retreat from Belgium. War ended in May 1945, but was followed by acute steel shortages across western Europe, and it took around another five years before the necessary repairs could be completed.

=== Reconstruction ===
By the 1990s the viaduct had deteriorated badly, to the point where trains crossing it had to be restricted to a maximum speed of 20 km/h (12 mph). Various options were discussed, including destroying and replacing the bridge, or reconfiguring the routes that used it to use a less direct route in order to be able to avoid a railway line crossing the Geul Valley at this point. However, the alternative routes available would need significant upgrades elsewhere on the network in order to provide the additional capacity to provide for permanent rerouting, and the option was rejected as impractical. The idea of destroying and replacing the bridge was also rejected because the route using the bridge remained important for freight traffic, and a lengthy closure of the line was therefore out of the question. An extensive restoration was therefore undertaken of the existing bridge between February 2002 and October 2004 by the "Galère-Aelterman consortium" at an approximate cost of €23.5 million. The line remained open during the project, apart from twelve weekends of line closures that took place at approximately eight-week intervals and lasted from 15.30 on the Saturdays until 17.30 on the Mondays of the weekends affected. Extensive rerouting schedules were implemented for the affected weekends, intended to minimize disruption and delays.

Each of the old steel bridge-deck sections was replaced. Although not visually dissimilar, the new sections use a steel box frame structure with a 6 × 6 meter cross-section in place of the 8 × 8 meter cross-section used in 1916. As the steel decking is now lower, a 30 cm thick continuous slab of reinforced concrete is superimposed on this. The rail tracks themselves are mounted not directly on the concrete, but embedded in a gravel ballast bed in order to protect the structure from vibration and support noise reduction objectives.

In order to minimize disruption to traffic, the steel bridge-deck sections were assembled off-site, directly beside the rail-freight marshalling yard at Montzen, and then transported the few kilometers to the bridge in order to be positioned using a specially prepared overhead crane structure (see picture). This exercise was undertaken, two deck-sections at a time, at approximately eight weekly intervals during a weekend "window" when the line was closed to traffic. Once the new bridge-deck had been completed, and the permanent replacement track laid the next year, the speed limit on the bridge was raised from 20 km/h (12 mph) to 60 km/h (37 mph).

=== Electrification ===
After the renewal of the bridge-deck had been completed, plans were implemented in 2008 to electrify the final 7 km (4 miles) of line, being the section between Montzen and the Gemmenich Tunnel, which includes the Geul Valley bridge. The bridge is significant in this respect because it marks the point at which the power supply changes from the Belgian 3 kV DC system to the German 15 kV AC supply, and must be traversed using locomotives compatible with both systems, and which must be designed to pass from one supply to the other, lowering the pantograph(s) but without stopping.
