= Hubert Schmetz =

5th Mayor of Neutral Moresnet
- In office 20 June 1885 – 15 March 1915
- Preceded by: Oskar Anton Bilharz
- Succeeded by: Wilhelm Kyll

Personal details
- Born: Hubert Schmetz; 1862
- Died: 1930

Hubert Schmetz (1862-1930) was Mayor of Neutral Moresnet, a small neutral territory, from 20 June 1885 until 15 March 1915.

== Life ==
Schmetz became mayor of Neutral Moresnet on 20 June 1885, succeeding Oskar Anton Bilharz to become the territory's fifth mayor. As mayor, Bilharz served as the territory's head of state, alongside two commissioners, one each from the Kingdom of Prussia and Belgium.

During his term, Germany invaded Belgium on 4 August 1914, initially leaving Neutral Moresnet as "an oasis in a desert of destruction". A total of 147 Neutral Moresnet citizens were killed, though it is unclear whether they were killed inside the territory or in fighting outside its borders.

As a result of the occupation, Schmetz was removed from his post on 15 March 1915 and Germany appointed Wilhelm Kyll to succeed him. Neutral Moresnet was formally annexed by the Kingdom of Prussia on 27 June 1915, although the annexation never received international recognition.

With a term of nearly 30 years, Schmetz was Neutral Moresnet's second-longest-serving mayor, having served more than a quarter of the territory's existence.

Preceded by Oskar Anton Bilharz	Mayor of Neutral Moresnet; 1885 – 1915	Succeeded by Wilhelm Kyll
