= Jean-Jacques Dony =

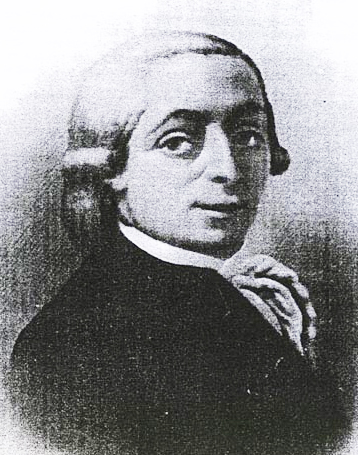
- Born: Jean-Jacques Daniël Dony; 24 February 1759; Liège, Austrian Netherlands (now: Belgium)
- Died: 6 November 1819 (aged 60); Bois-l'Évêque, Normandy, France
- Occupations: Inventor, industrialist

Jean-Jacques Daniël Dony (24 February 1759 – 6 November 1819) was an inventor and industrialist. He invented a procedure for the production of pure zinc, and opened a mine in Moresnet.

== Biography ==
Dony was born on 24 February 1759 in Liège. He studied to become a priest, but in 1797 took over his father's business as a cattle transporter.

Dony invented a procedure for the industrial production of totally pure zinc. In 1806, Napoleon granted him a monopoly for the exploitation of the zinc mines of Moresnet, now in Liège Province, Belgium. The mines were successful, and his company became Europe's largest producer of zinc. These mines continued operating until 1880.

From the exploitation of the Moresnet mines rose the 'Vieille Montagne Association' (French for Old Mountain), which later expanded its operations abroad (to France, Germany and Sweden (Zinkgruvan) among others). The activities of the association of the Old Mountain were taken over in 1989 by the Union Minière (Mining Union) group, which is known since 2001 as Umicore.

In 1809, Dony opened a factory in Liège, but ran into financial difficulties, and was forced to sell 75% of his stocks. In 1819, he was declared bankrupt, and died in Bois-l'Évêque on 6 November 1819, at the age of 60.
