= Arnold Timothée de Lasaulx =

1st Mayor of Neutral Moresnet
- In office 1817 – 2 February 1859
- Preceded by: Position established
- Succeeded by: Adolf Hubert van Scherpenzeel-Thim

Personal details
- Born: Arnold Timothée Albert Francois Joseph de Lasaulx; 21 January 1774 Castle Alensberg, Belgium
- Died: 18 July 1863 (aged 89)
- Spouse: Anne-Dorothe-Antoinette-Josphine de Braumann
- Children: 6

Arnold Timothée Albert Francois Joseph de Lasaulx (21 January 1774 – 18 July 1863) was a Belgian politician who served as the first Mayor of Neutral Moresnet from 1817 until 1859. Having served for more than 41 years, he was Neutral Moresnet's longest-serving mayor, having served for nearly half of the territory's existence.

== Life ==
Lasaulx was born at Castle Alensberg, the son of Pierre-Olivier-Albert-Georges-Joseph de Lasaulx and Marie-Anne-Emérantiane-Josèphe de Mylius.

He married Anne-Dorothée-Antoinette-Joséphine de Braumann, with whom he had six children:

- Marie-Anne-Françoise-Dorothée
- Pierre-Ignace-Arnold-Marie
- Catherine-Elisabeth-Henriette-Hubertine
- Madeleine-Antoinette-Ulrique-Eugénie
- Antoinette-Caroline-Joséphine-Catherine
- Gaspar-Joseph-Eugène-Louis

He was a knight of the Austrian Order of Leopold and was awarded the Prussian Red Eagle Order, third class.

From 1817 to 1859 he was Mayor of Neutral Moresnet.

Preceded by Position established	Mayor of Neutral Moresnet; 1817 - 1859	Succeeded by Adolf Hubert van Scherpenzeel-Thim
