= SNCB Type 1 =

Class of 4-6-2 locomotives

NMBS/SNCB Type 1
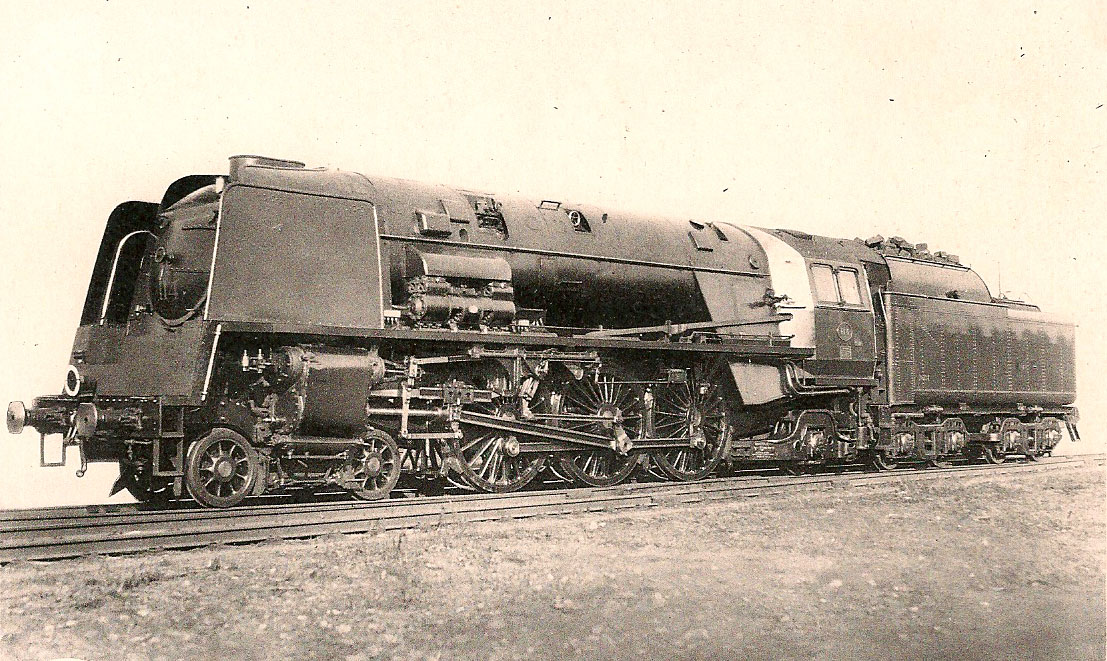
- NMBS/SNCB Type 1
Type and origin
- Power type: Steam
- Builder: Société Anonyme la Métallurgique, Tubize
- Build date: 1935 - 1938
- Total produced: 35
Specifications
- Configuration
  - Whyte: 4-6-2
  - UIC: 2′C1′ h4
- Gauge: 1,435 mm (4 ft 8 1/2 in) standard gauge
- Driver dia.: 1,980 mm (77.95 in)
- Loco weight: 124 tonnes (122 long tons; 137 short tons)
- Tender weight: 86 tonnes (84.6 long tons; 94.8 short tons)
- Water cap.: 48,000 litres (11,000 imperial gallons; 13,000 US gallons)
- Firebox
  - Grate area: 5.00 m^{2} (53.8 sq ft)
- Boiler pressure: 18 atm (1.82 MPa; 265 psi)
- Feedwater heater: ACFI
- Heating surface: 234.8 m^{2} (2,527 sq ft)
- Superheater
  - Heating area: 111.7 m^{2} (1,202 sq ft)
- Cylinders: Four
- Cylinder size: 420 mm × 720 mm (16.54 in × 28.35 in)
Performance figures
- Tractive effort: 198.9 kN (44,710 lbf)
Career
- Operators: NMBS/SNCB
- Class: Type 1
- Numbers: 101 - 135 1.001 – 1.035
- Withdrawn: 1962
- Preserved: One: 1.002
- Disposition: 1 preserved, 34 scrapped

The NMBS/SNCB Type 1 was a class of 4-6-2 steam locomotives built in 1935 and 1938 for working heavy express passenger trains operated by the National Railway Company of Belgium (NMBS/SNCB).

== Design, construction and service history ==
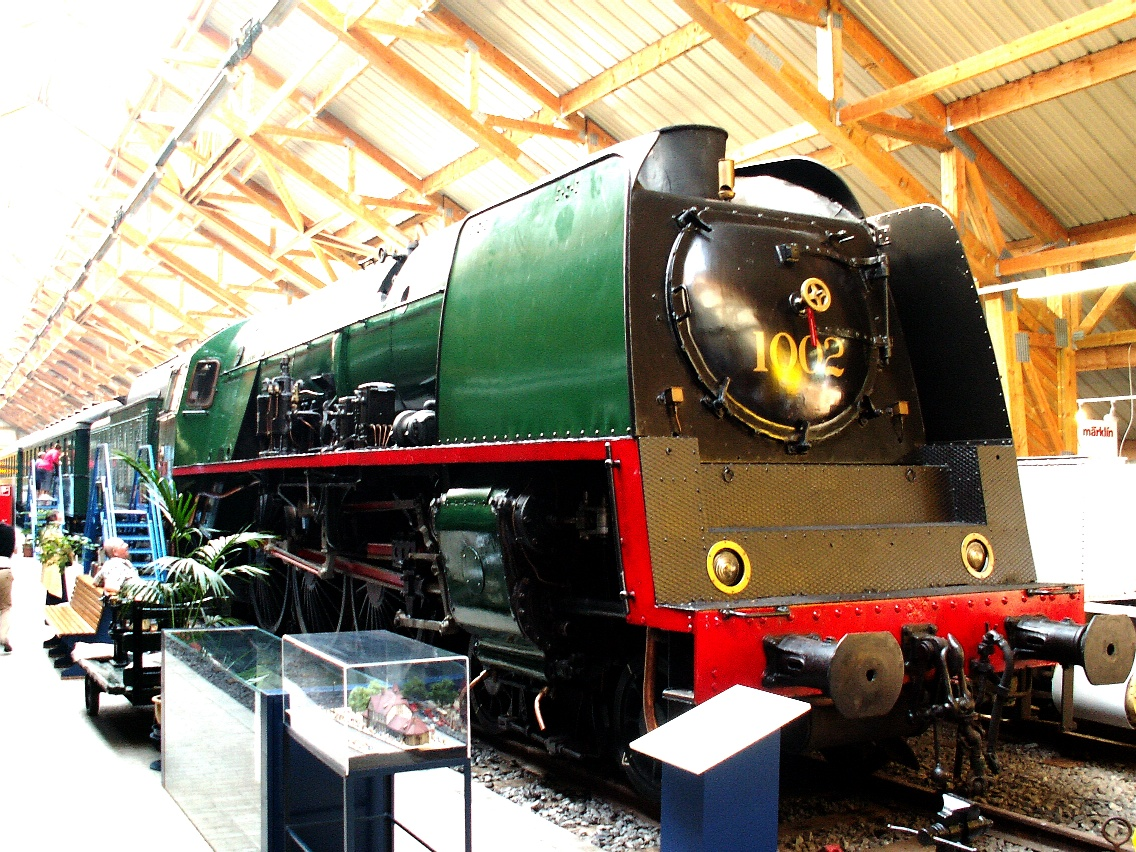
No. 1.002 on display at Treignes

Thirty five type 1 locomotives were built by the Société Anonyme la Métallurgique at its Tubize factory. They had a high degree of superheat, and a firebox that was so wide, it had two firehole doors. The members of the class were retired in 1962.

One locomotive, no. 1.002, has been preserved by the NMBS/SNCB. It is displayed at the Treignes railway museum of heritage railway CFV3V (Chemin de fer à vapeur des trois vallées) in the far south of Belgium.
