= Bois-l'Évêque =

- Commune
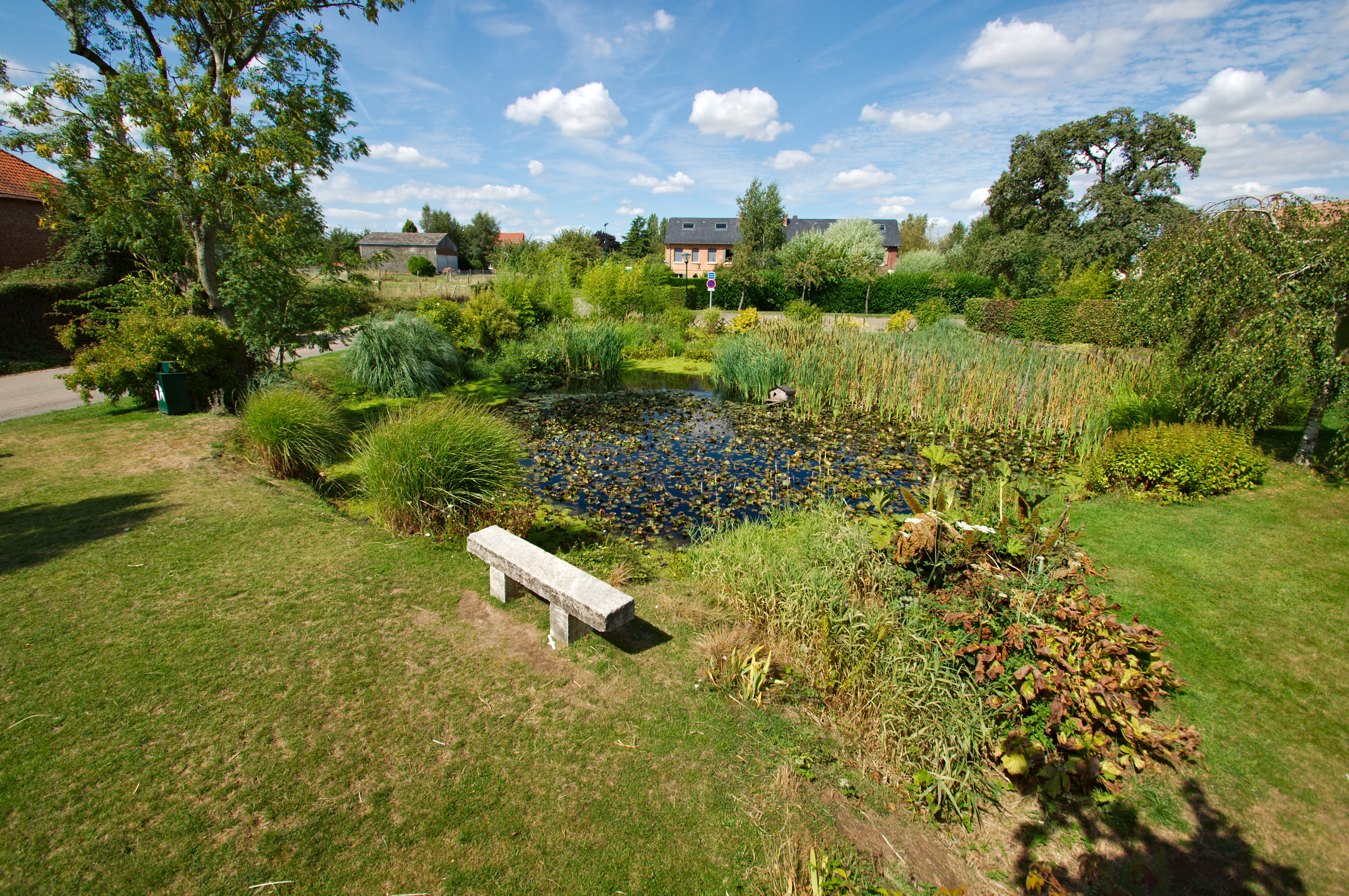
- The pond in Bois-l'Évêque

- Coat of arms
- Location of Bois-l'Évêque
- Location within France Location within Normandy
- Coordinates: 49°27′01″N 1°15′55″E
- Country: France
- Region: Normandy
- Department: Seine-Maritime
- Arrondissement: Rouen
- Canton: Le Mesnil-Esnard

Government
  - Mayor (2020–2026): Frédéric Tihi
- Area^{1}: 7.21 km^{2} (2.78 sq mi)
- Elevation: 145 m (476 ft)
- Highest elevation: 163 m (535 ft)
- Lowest elevation: 100 m (330 ft)
- Population (2023): 641
  - Density: 88.9/km^{2} (230/sq mi)
- Time zone: UTC+01:00 (CET)
  - Summer (DST): UTC+02:00 (CEST)
- INSEE/Postal code: 76111 /76160
- ^{1} French Land Register data, which excludes lakes, ponds, glaciers > 1 km^{2} (0.386 sq mi or 247 acres) and river estuaries.

Bois-l'Évêque (French pronunciation: [bwa levɛk]) is a commune in the Seine-Maritime department in the Normandy region in northern France.

== Geography ==
A farming village situated some 8 miles (13 km) east of Rouen at the junction of the D53 and the D43 roads.

== Population ==
Historical population
Year	Pop.	±% p.a.
1968	175	—
1975	202	+2.07%
1982	260	+3.67%
1990	290	+1.37%
1999	368	+2.68%
2007	494	+3.75%
2012	500	+0.24%
2017	554	+2.07%
2023	641	+2.46%
Source: INSEE

== Places of interest ==
- The church of Notre-Dame, dating from the nineteenth century.
- Remnants of the 13th-century priory de Beaulieu.
- The nineteenth century Château de Bethel.
- Ruins of a 13th-century chapel.

== See also ==
- Communes of the Seine-Maritime department
