= Hergenrath =

Section of Kelmis, East Belgium

- Village
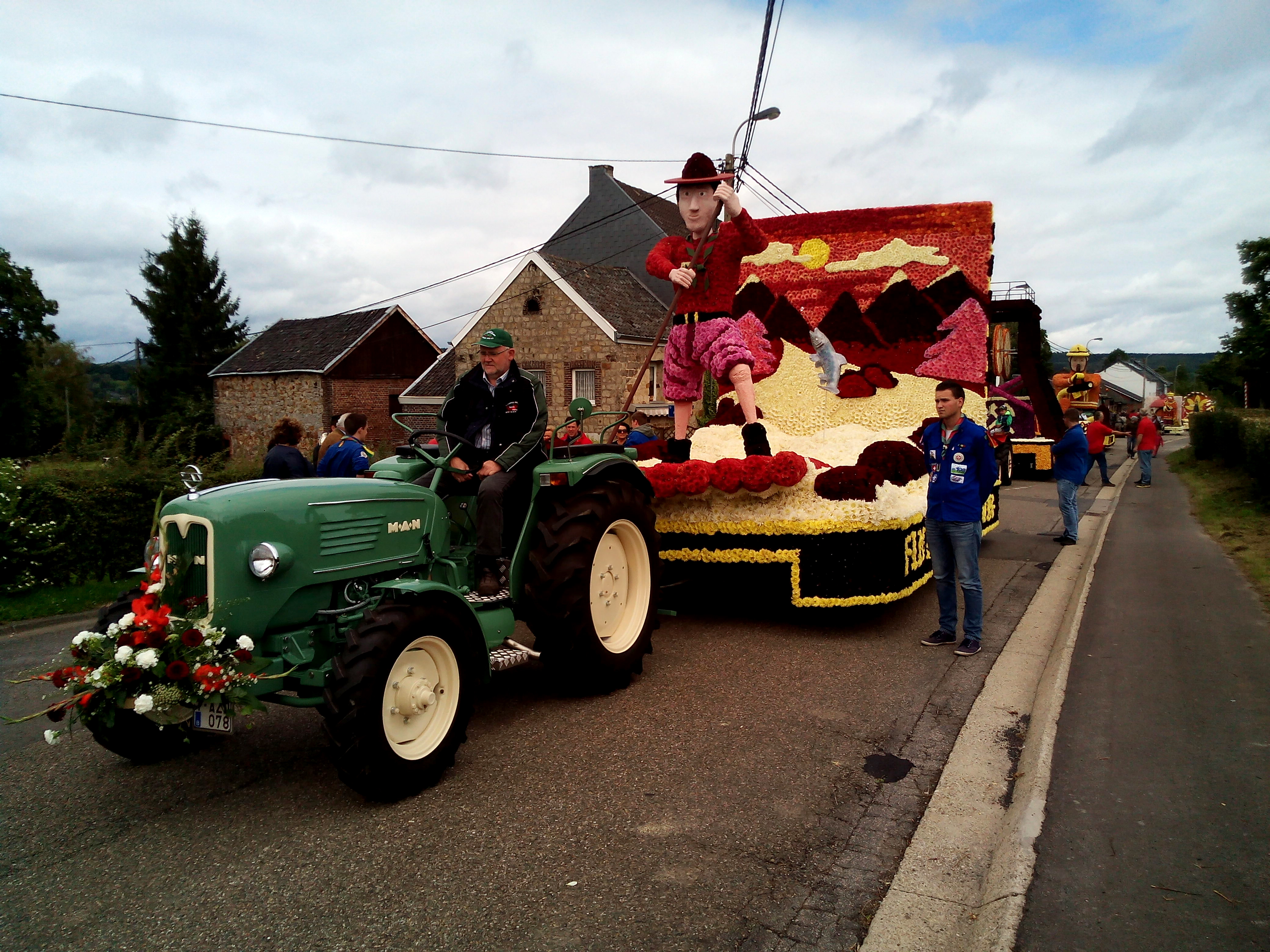
- Flower parade in Hergenrath

- Location in Belgium
- Coordinates: 50.7077°N 6.0327°E
- Country: Belgium
- Community: German-speaking Community of Belgium
- Region: Wallonia
- Province: Liège
- Municipality: Kelmis
- Time zone: CET

Hergenrath (German pronunciation: [ˈhɛʁɡn̩ˌʁaːt]) or Hergenraedt (Standard Dutch: Hergenraat; Limburgish: Herjent) is a village and sub-municipality in Belgium. It is located in the municipality of Kelmis in Liège Province, part of Wallonia. It is part of the German-speaking Community of Belgium.

== History ==
Hergenrath was historically part of the Duchy of Limburg, one of the provinces of the Burgundian Netherlands. A dialect of German is spoken in Hergenrath, but the duchy it was part of was multilingual, with Dutch, French, and German dialects spoken. The area was annexed by France in 1794, then awarded to the Kingdom of Prussia by the Congress of Vienna, and became part of Belgium after World War I. In 1940, Belgium was invaded by Nazi-Germany who merged Moresnet, Kelmis, Neu-Moresnet, and Hergenrath into Amt Moresnet as an integral part of Germany. In 1944, the villages were returned to Belgium.

Hergenrath is now part of the Belgian Liège Province and forms part of the German-speaking Community of Belgium. It was an independent municipality until 1977 when it was merged into Kelmis.

== Eyneburg Castle ==
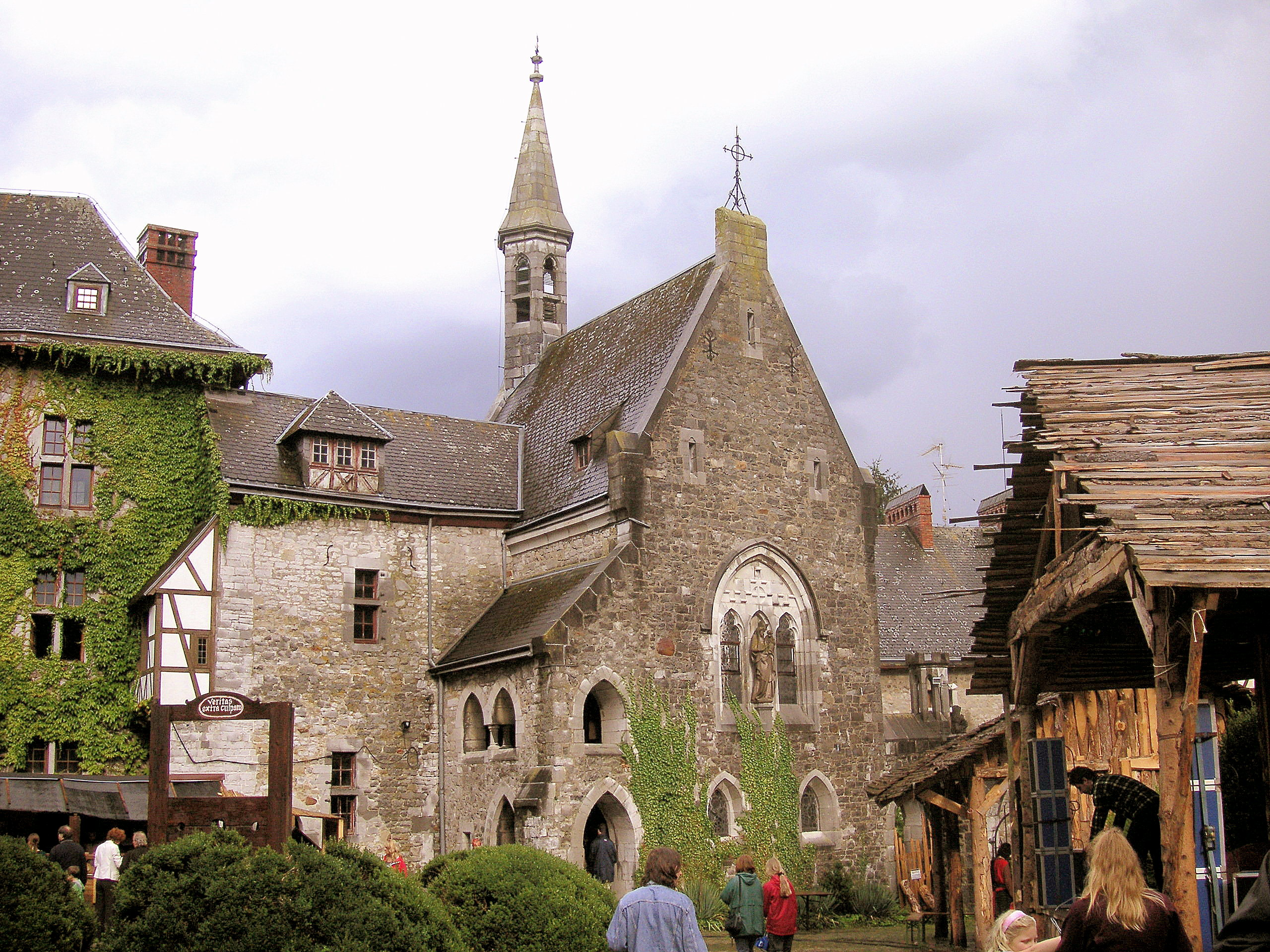

Eyneburg Castle dominates the village of Hergenrath. It is located on a hill, and was first mentioned in 1260. According to legend, Emma, the daughter of Charlemagne, lived in the castle. In 1640, a fire destroyed most of the original castle. It was also extensively rebuilt and enlarged in the 20th century. In 1966, castle Eyneburg was declared a monument. In 2001, it was bought by the Eyne company and publicly accessible. As of 2011, the castle is closed and for sale.
