= Vieille Montagne =

Ancient zinc mine in Kelmis (La Calamine) in Belgium

Coordinates: 50°36′36″N 5°36′45″E

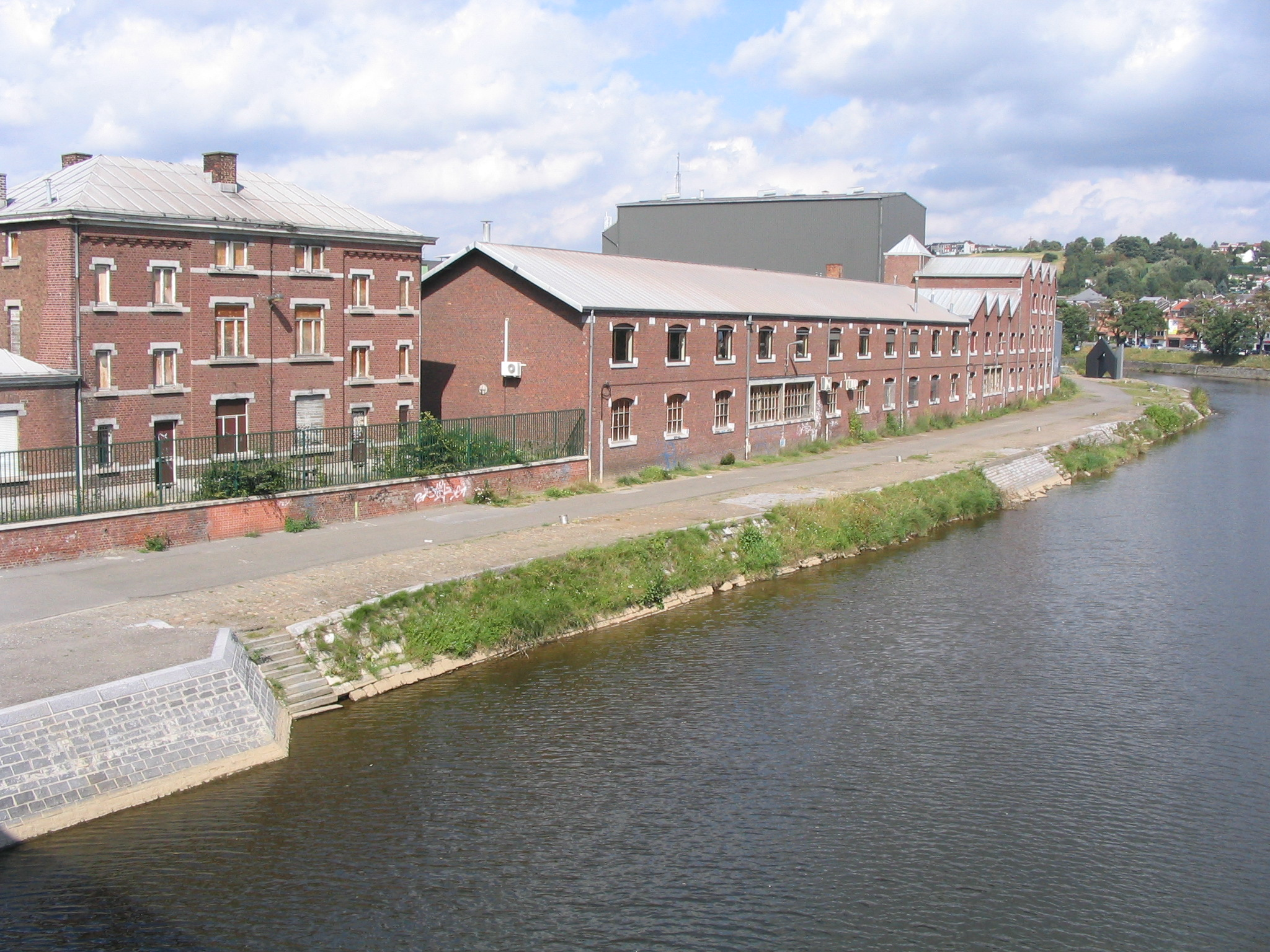
Vieille Montagne factory in Angleur

The Société des mines et fonderies de zinc de la Vieille-Montagne (French; lit. 'Company for Mines and Foundries of Zinc at Vieille-Montagne') was a Belgian mining company which produced zinc. The company took its name from an important zinc mine known as "old mountain" or "old mine" (Altenberg) located near Kelmis. The mine was once a bone of contention between Prussia on the one side and the United Kingdom of the Netherlands (later Belgium) on the other, that resulted in a piece of land that became the territory of Neutral Moresnet.

== History ==
Emblem of the Vieille Montagne

After he developed an original refining process, Belgian industrialist Jean-Jacques Dony received a decree from the Napoleonic authorities in 1806, allowing him to mine the zinc ore deposit at La Vieille Montagne near Liège. At that time, the area belonged to the French département of the Ourthe. After Napoleon's defeat, in 1816 the département was divided between Prussia, the Netherlands and the neutral zone of Neu-Moresnet, which contained the zinc mine. The Société des Mines et Fonderies de Zinc de la Vieille-Montagne (lit. ‘Vieille Montagne Zinc Mining Company and Foundries’) was created in 1837, after the independence of Belgium (which took over the Dutch claim to the neutral zone).

The workers of the VM were recruited by Joseph Wharton in the mid-19th century to help him start his metallurgical business. At the time the name of the manager of VM was De Gee, who obtained a patent to make zinc oxide by burning a mixture of coal and zinc ore.

The Belgian mine continued its operation until the end of the nineteenth century, when a workforce of 300 produced 8,500 ton of crude zinc annually.

The company opened a second zinc mine in Zinkgruvan in Sweden, which is still in operation. It also ran a harbour in Åmmeberg to ship the zinc. The ore was shipped to another affiliate in Balen, Belgium.

The Société des Mines et Fonderies de Zinc de la Vieille-Montagne company of Belgium (or ‘VM’ for short) came to England in 1896, specifically to the small remote village of Nenthead in the Pennine Hills of Cumbria. The company survived two world wars and the inter-war economic depression, as well as fluctuations in the geological supply and market demand for zinc and lead. Then in 1949, after fifty-three years of operation, the VM sold its mineral leases, plant and equipment and left.

In the department of Ariège in France, the VM company took the lease on the zinc mines at Bentaillou in the Pyrenees, also after World War II.

The name became synonymous with zinc oxide and with rolled zinc, especially for building applications. The company was the world's oldest and also largest zinc producer, producing at its peak at least 149,000 tonnes per year. In 1989 Vieille Montagne was merged into the Union Minière group, based in Belgium, which became Umicore in 2003. The group continues its rolled zinc activity under the brand VMZinc, which still refers back to the historical link with Vieille Montagne.

Production on the site stopped in 1982. After rehabilitation work, the municipality gave the green light in 2025 to a new urbanization plan covering the mine's area. The Museum Vieille Montagne opened that same year in La Calamine to commemorate the history of the site.

== Strike in Balen ==
In 1971 it was discovered the workmen in the other Belgian plants had a much higher salary for similar work. The workers in Balen wanted a raise. This led to a dispute between the workmen, the trade unions and the directors board. The 1500 workmen in Balen went on strike, but this was not accepted by the trade unions. As a result, the workmen were not paid. The strike went on for 9 weeks. Many charities were set up by inhabitants of Mol and Balen. Jef Sleecks, a politician, convinced the banks to cancel payments temporarily for affected workmen. Landlords did not ask rent during the strike. All kind of shops gave food for free or gave the impacted workmen a temporary job. At the end, the directors board agreed and the workmen even got a higher wage than requested. The events in Balen were written in the theatre play and novel Groenten uit Balen by Walter van den Broeck. The book was filmed in 2012. All events regarding the strike did happen, all referenced places do/did exist, and only the family Debreucker is a fictive one.

== See also ==
- Willemite (villemite), discovered here
