= Kelmis =

Municipality in the German-speaking Community of Belgium

- Municipality
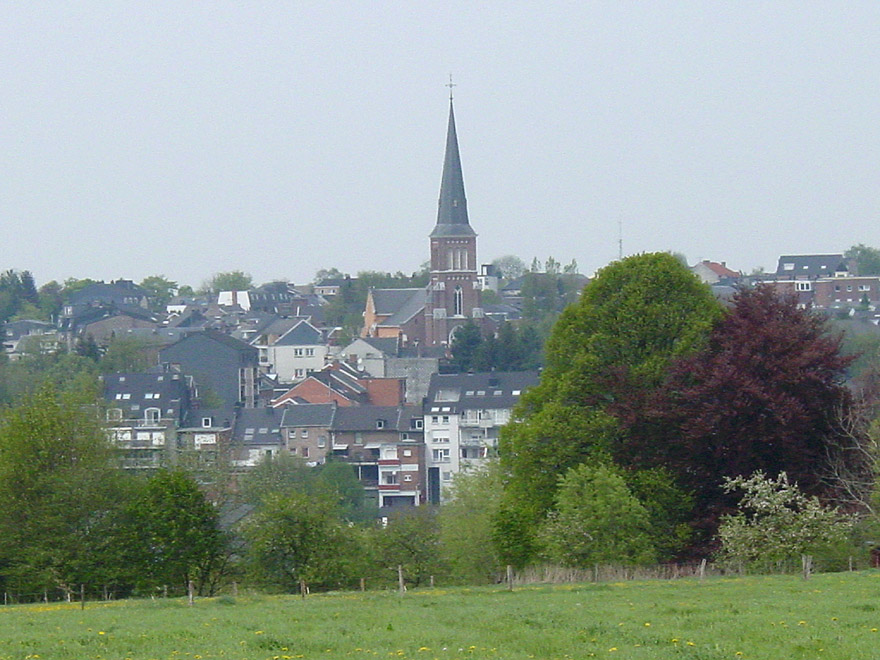
- View of Kelmis

- Flag Coat of arms

- Location of Kelmis in the province of Liège
- Interactive map of Kelmis
- Location in Belgium
- Coordinates: 50°42′N 06°00′E
- Country: Belgium
- Community: German-speaking Community of Belgium
- Region: Wallonia
- Province: Liège
- Arrondissement: Verviers

Government
  - Mayor: Daniel Hilligsmann (Elan)
  - Governing party: CSP/cdH - SP/PS

Area
  - Total: 18.04 km^{2} (6.97 sq mi)

Population (2018-01-01)
  - Total: 11,061
  - Density: 613.1/km^{2} (1,588/sq mi)
- Postal codes: 4720–4728
- NIS code: 63040
- Area codes: 087
- Website: www.kelmis.be

Kelmis (German pronunciation: [ˈkɛlmɪs]; French: La Calamine, pronounced [la kalamin]) is a municipality located in the Belgian province of Liège, named for the historical deposits of calamine (zinc ore) nearby. As of 2011, the population was 10,881; the area is 18.1 square kilometres (7.0 sq mi), and the population density is 601.2 inhabitants per square kilometre (1,557/sq mi).

The municipality comprises the following sub-municipalities: Kelmis proper, Hergenrath, and Neu-Moresnet.

The territory around the Vieille Montagne zinc mine in Kelmis was Neutral Moresnet, a neutral condominium of the Netherlands and Prussia (later Belgium and Germany) from 1816 to 1919, with the Mayor of Kelmis nominated by two commissioners from the neighbouring countries. Although locals attempted to change it into a fully independent microstate, all attempts were thwarted, and it remained under double sovereignty and neutrality until its annexation by Belgium after the First World War.

A war memorial to German soldiers from Kelmis who were killed during the Franco-Prussian War is located in the Aachener Strasse, and one to inhabitants of Kelmis who were killed in the First and Second World Wars is located in the Kirchplatz (French: Place de l'Église).

A small museum in Kelmis, the Museum Vieille Montagne, includes exhibits on Neutral Moresnet. More than 50 of the territory's original 60 border markers still stand.

In the nineteenth century, a Low Dietsch dialect was spoken in Kelmis. Today, Kelmis is German-speaking. It has facilities for French speakers, and is one of the nine municipalities of the German‑speaking Community of Belgium.

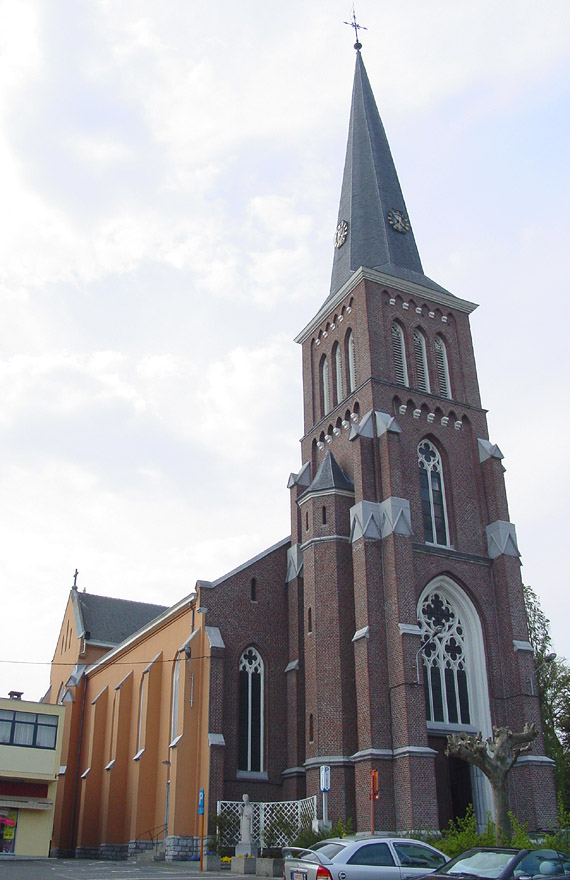
Our Lady of the Assumption Church in the centre of Kelmis

== See also ==
- List of protected heritage sites in Kelmis
