= Neutral Moresnet =

1816–1920 small Belgian–Prussian condominium

Coordinates: 50°43′49″N 6°00′48″E

Neutral Moresnet: Neutraal Moresnet (Dutch); Moresnet Neutre (French); Neutral-Moresnet (German); Neutraal Moresent (Limburgish)
- 1816–1920
- Flag
- Anthem: The Amikejo-March (Marche Amikejo)
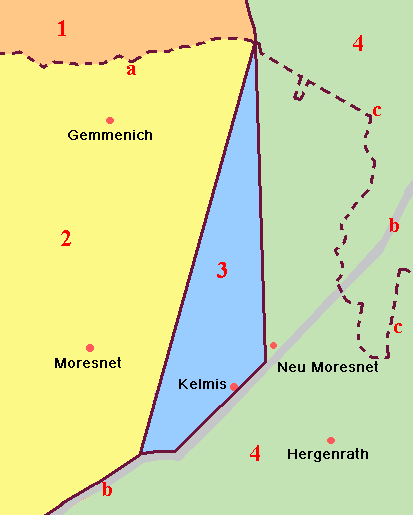
- Dutch Province of Limburg (1); Belgian Liège Province (2); Neutral Moresnet (3); Prussian Rhine Province (4)
- Status: Neutral zone
- Capital: Kelmis
- Languages: Dutch; French; German; Low Dietsch dialect of Limburgish
- Demonym: Moresnetic
- Government: Condominium sui iuris
- Mayor
  - 1817–1859 (first): Arnold de Lasaulx
  - 1918–1920 (last): Pierre Grignard
- Historical era: Late modern
  - Aachen Agreement: 26 June 1816
  - Prussian annexation: 27 June 1915
  - Treaty of Versailles: 28 June 1919
  - Belgian annexation: 10 January 1920

Area
  - Total: 3.5 km^{2} (1.4 sq mi)

Population
  - 1900: 3,009
  - 1914: 3,501
- Currency: French franc
| Preceded by | Succeeded by |
| Kingdom of France | Weimar Republic; Belgium |
- Today part of: Belgium

Neutral Moresnet (French pronunciation: [mɔʁɛsnɛt], [mɔʁɛsnɛ], German pronunciation: [ˈmɔʁəsnɛt], [ˌmɔʁəsˈnɛt]) was a small Belgian–Prussian condominium in western Europe that existed from 1816 to 1920 and was administered jointly by the United Kingdom of the Netherlands, Belgium (after its independence in 1830) and the Kingdom of Prussia. It was 1.5km wide and 2.5km long, with an area of 3.5 square kilometres. After 1830, the territory's northernmost border point at Vaalserberg connected it to a quadripoint shared additionally with the Dutch Province of Limburg, the Prussian Rhine Province, and the Belgian Liège Province. That border point's position is currently represented by the Three-Country Point, the meeting place of the borders of Belgium, Germany, and the Netherlands.

During the First World War, Neutral Moresnet was annexed by Germany. The armistice between France and Germany in November 1918 forced Germany to withdraw from Belgium and Neutral Moresnet. A year later, the Treaty of Versailles awarded Neutral Moresnet to Belgium, so from January 1920 it became the municipality of Kelmis.

During the Second World War, Kelmis and the surrounding area were annexed by Germany, and its name was changed to Moresnet. The territory was returned to Belgium at the end of the war.

== History ==
=== Origins ===
After the demise of Napoleon's Empire, the Congress of Vienna of 1814–15 redrew the European map, intending to create a balance of power in Europe. One of the borders to be delineated was the one between the newly created United Kingdom of the Netherlands and the Kingdom of Prussia. While both parties could agree on the larger part of the territory, as borders mostly followed older lines, the district of Moresnet proved problematic, mainly because of a valuable zinc spar mine named Altenberg (German) or Vieille Montagne (French) located there. The governments of both the Netherlands and Prussia desired to appropriate this resource, which was needed for the production of zinc and brass – at that time, Bristol in the United Kingdom was the only other place where zinc ore was processed.

In December 1815, Dutch and Prussian representatives convened in nearby Aachen, and on 26 June 1816, a compromise was obtained, dividing the district of Moresnet into three parts. The Dutch absorbed the village of Moresnet itself into Liège Province, while the Prussian village Moresnet (renamed Neu-Moresnet after World War I) became part of the Prussian Rhine Province and the mine and village adjacent became a neutral territory pending a future agreement. The two powers, whose armies were prohibited from occupying the area, established a joint administration.

When Belgium gained its independence from the Netherlands in 1830, the Belgians assumed control of the Dutch role in Neutral Moresnet (though the Dutch never formally ceded their claim).

=== Borders ===
Formal installation of border demarcation markers for the territory occurred on 23 September 1818. The territory of Neutral Moresnet had a somewhat triangular shape, with the base being the main road from Aachen to Liège. The village and mine lay just to the north of this road. To east and west, two straight lines converged on the Vaalserberg.

The roads from Germany and Belgium to the Three‑Country Point are named Dreiländerweg (lit. 'Three Countries Way') and Route des Trois Bornes ('Three Border Stones Road') respectively; the road from the Netherlands is called Viergrenzenweg ('Four Borders Way').

=== Flag ===
Emblem of the Vieille Montagne company may have inspired the Moresnet flag.

From 1883, Neutral Moresnet used a tricolour with horizontal bars in black, white and blue as its territorial flag. The origin is unknown and has been explained in two different ways:

- It is argued by some that the colours were taken from the two conflicting powers' flags, with black and white representing Prussia, while white and blue represent the Netherlands.
- According to Flags of the World, "it seems more likely that the colours have been taken from the emblem of the Vieille Montagne", a mining company.

=== Status ===
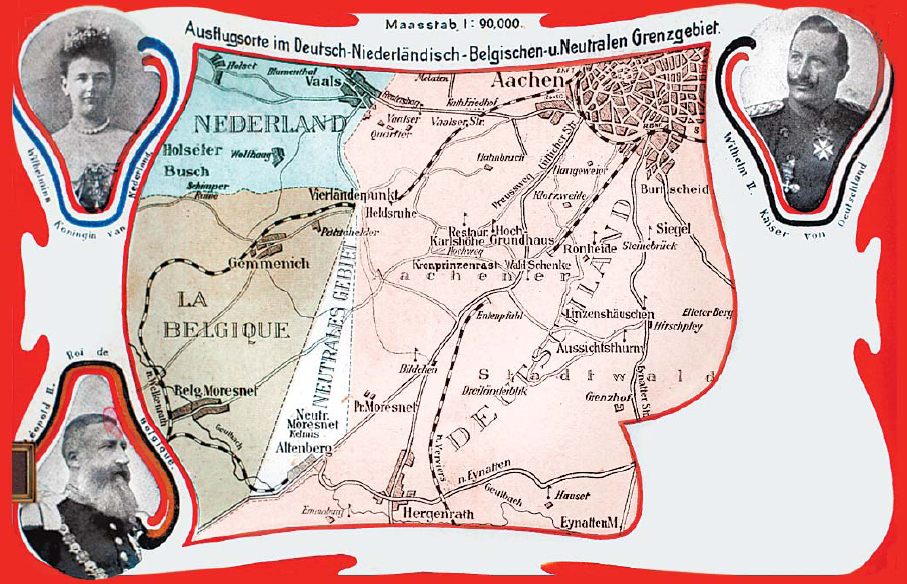
Neutral Moresnet on a postcard c. 1900

The territory was governed by two royal commissioners, one from each neighbour. Eventually, these commissioners were commonly civil servants from the Belgian Verviers and the Prussian Eupen. The municipal administration was directed by a mayor appointed by the commissioners.

The Napoleonic civil and penal codes, introduced during French rule, remained in force throughout the existence of Neutral Moresnet. However, since no law court existed in the neutral territory, Belgian and Prussian judges had to come in and decide cases based on the Napoleonic laws. Since there was no administrative court either, the judge's decision could not be appealed.

In 1859, Neutral Moresnet was granted a greater measure of self-administration by the installation of a municipal council of ten members. The council, as well as a welfare committee and a school committee, were appointed by the mayor and served an advisory function only. The people had no voting rights.

Life in Neutral Moresnet was dominated by the Vieille Montagne mining company, which not only was the major employer but also operated residences, shops, a hospital and a bank. The mine attracted many workers from the neighboring countries, increasing the population from 256 in 1815 to 2,275 in 1858 and 4,668 in 1914. Most services, such as the mail, were shared between Belgium and Prussia (in a fashion similar to Andorra). There were five schools in the territory, and Prussian subjects could attend the schools in Prussian Moresnet.

Living in the territory had several benefits. Among these were the low taxes (the national budget being fixed at 2,735 Belgian francs throughout most of its history), the absence of import tariffs from both neighbouring countries, and low prices compared to just across the border. A downside to their special status was the fact that people from Neutral Moresnet were considered stateless and were not allowed a military of their own.

Many immigrants settled in Moresnet so they would be exempt from military service; however, in 1854, Belgium began to conscript its citizens who had relocated to Moresnet, and Prussia did likewise in 1874. From then on, the exemption applied only to descendants of the original inhabitants.

=== Currency ===
Neutral Moresnet did not have its own currency. The French franc was legal tender. The currencies of Prussia (and then Germany, after 1871), Belgium and the Netherlands were also in circulation. In 1848, local currency began circulating, though these coins were not considered the official medium.

=== Uncertain future ===
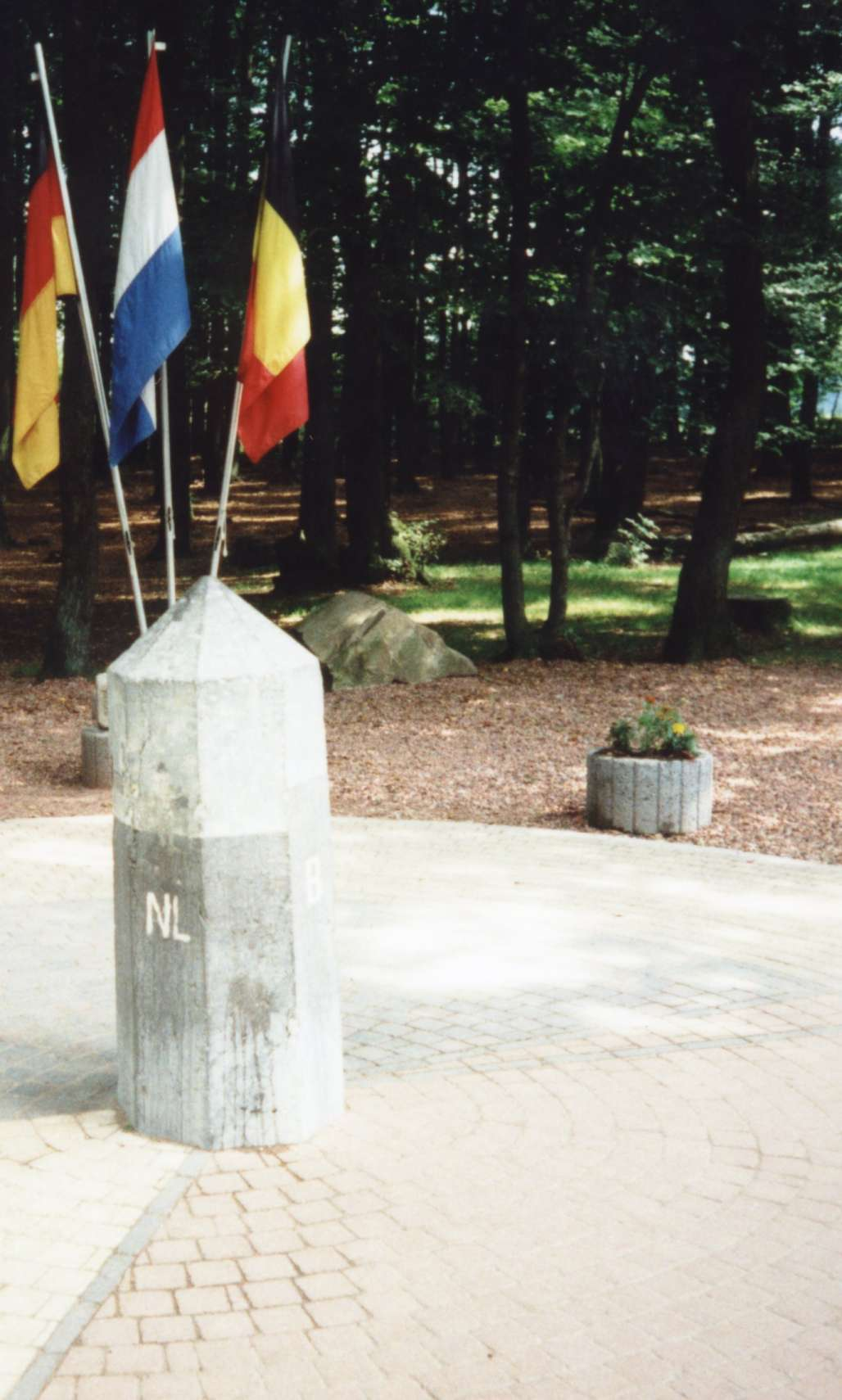
The Three-Country Point on the Vaalserberg presently. Until 1915, this was also the location of Neutral Moresnet's apex.

When the mine was exhausted in 1885, the continued survival of Neutral Moresnet was in doubt. Perhaps in response, the next year Wilhelm Molly (1838–1919), the mine's chief medical doctor and an avid philatelist, tried to organise a local postal service with its own stamps. This enterprise was quickly thwarted by Belgian intervention.

In about 1900, Germany began a more aggressive policy concerning the territory and was accused of sabotage and obstructing the administrative process in order to force the issue.

A casino was established in August 1903 after the Belgians closed all such resorts in Belgium. The Moresnet casino operated with strict limitations, permitting no local resident to gamble, and no more than 20 people to gather at a time. The venture was abandoned, however, when Kaiser Wilhelm II threatened to partition the territory or cede it to Belgium to end the gambling. Around this same time, Moresnet boasted three distilleries for the manufacture of gin.

During 1908, Dr. Molly proposed making Neutral Moresnet the world's first Esperanto‑speaking state, named Amikejo ("friendship-place"). The proposed national anthem was an Esperanto march of the same name, set to the tune of "O Tannenbaum". Several residents learned Esperanto and a rally was held in Kelmis to endorse the idea of Amikejo on 13 August 1908, and a coat of arms was publicized. The World Congress of Esperanto, meeting in Dresden, even declared Neutral Moresnet the world capital of the Esperanto community.

=== First World War ===
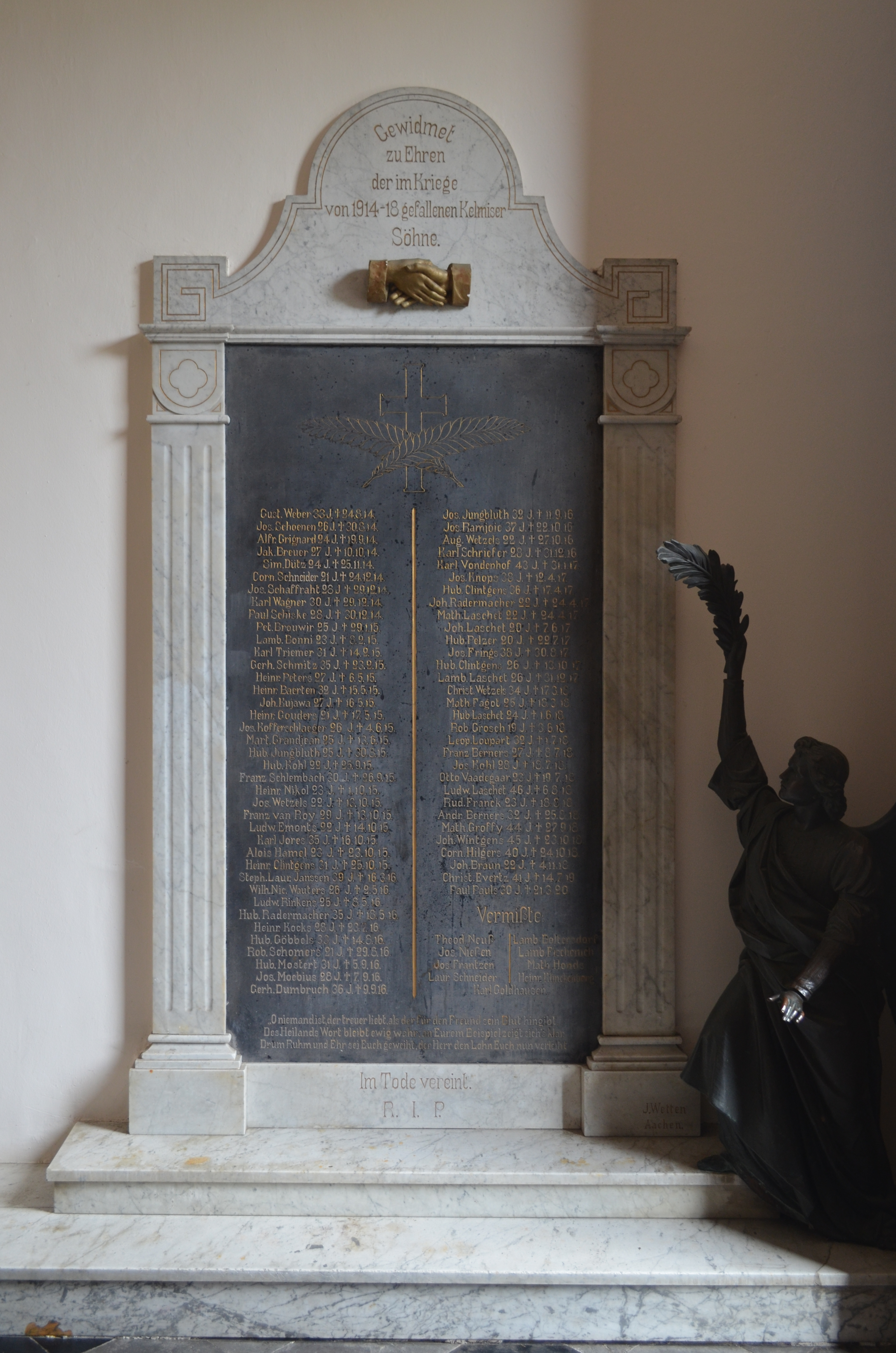
Memorial to the sons of Neutral Moresnet killed in both armies during World War I, at the right portal of Our Lady of the Assumption Church. At bottom, in German: "United in death, R.I.P."

The First World War resulted in the end of neutrality. On 4 August 1914, Germany invaded Belgium, initially leaving Neutral Moresnet as "an oasis in a desert of destruction". A total of 147 Neutral Moresnet citizens were killed, though it is unclear whether they were killed inside the territory or in fighting outside its borders. On 27 June 1915, Neutral Moresnet was annexed by the Kingdom of Prussia, although the annexation never received international recognition.

In 1918, the armistice between France and Germany, signed on 11 November at Compiègne, forced Germany to withdraw from Belgium and also from Moresnet. It also resulted in the ousting of Mayor Wilhelm Kyll, a German national who had been appointed after the German invasion.

On 28 June 1919, the Treaty of Versailles settled the dispute that had created the neutral territory a century earlier by awarding Neutral Moresnet, along with Prussian Moresnet and the German cantons of Eupen and Malmedy, to Belgium. The treaty became effective 10 January 1920, ending the territory's existence and converting it into a municipality in Belgium.

To distinguish it from the already existing town of Moresnet (in the neighboring municipality of Plombières), Neutral Moresnet was renamed Kelmis (in French: La Calamine) – after kelme, the local dialect word for zinc spar.

Despite the annexation, Neutral Moresnet Mayor Pierre Grignard effectively stayed in office and became the first mayor of Kelmis. The ten members of Neutral Moresnet's council were confirmed for the Kelmis municipal council after its Prussian members renounced their nationality. They remained in office until the election of a new municipal council on 7 February 1923.

=== Post-annexation history ===
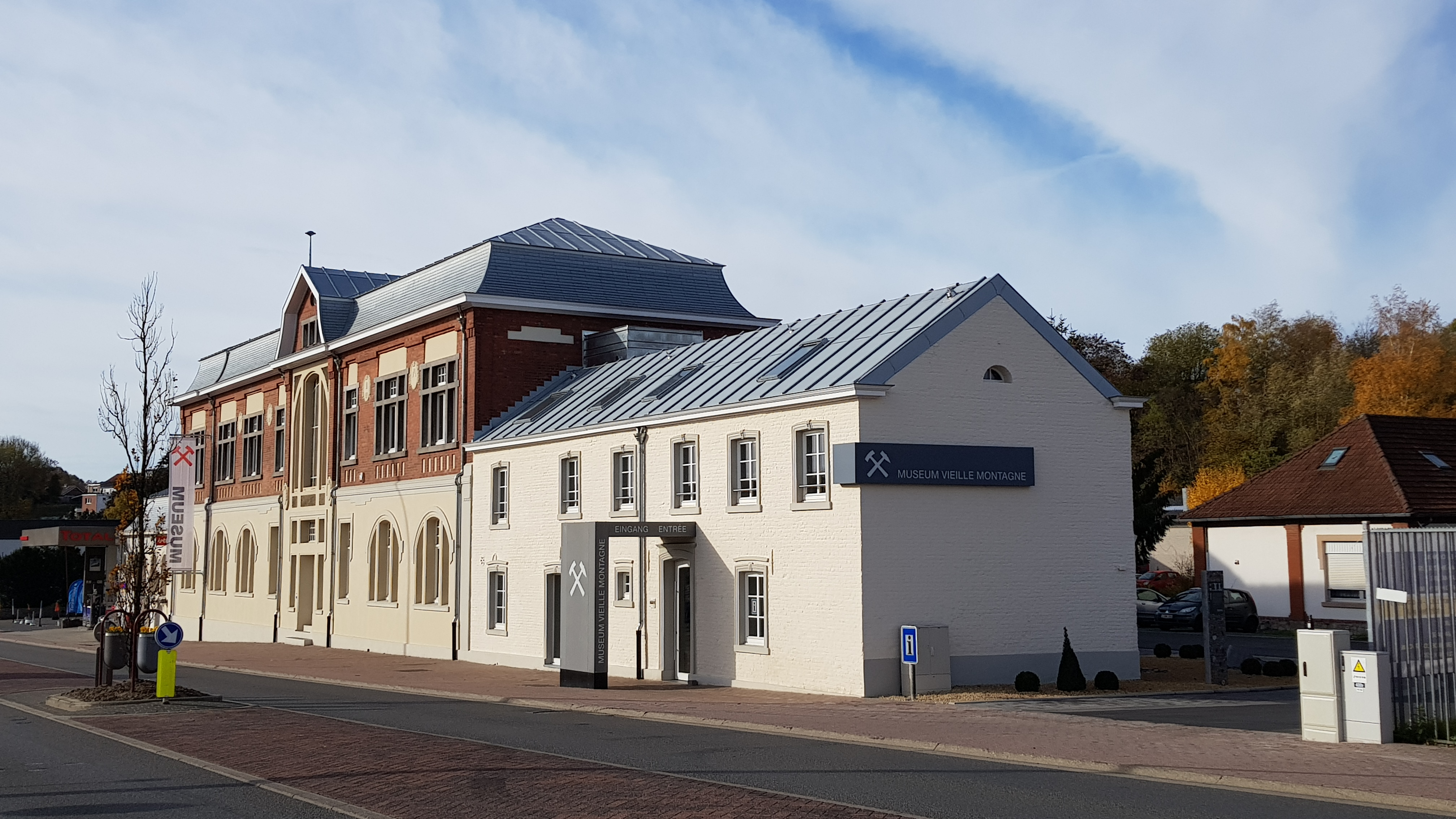
Local museum dedicated to the former territory

After 1920, Moresnet shared the history of Eupen-Malmedy. Germany briefly re‑annexed the area during World War II, but it was returned to Belgium in 1944. Since 1973, Kelmis has formed a part of the German‑speaking community of Belgium. During 1977, Kelmis absorbed the neighbouring communes of Neu‑Moresnet and Hergenrath.

A small museum in Kelmis, the Museum Vieille Montagne, includes exhibits on Neutral Moresnet. Of the 60 border markers for the territory, more than 50 are still standing.

As a company, Vieille Montagne survived Neutral Moresnet. It continues to exist as VMZINC, a part of Union Minière, the latter renamed in 2001 as Umicore, a global materials company.

== List of executive officers ==
List of Royal Commissioners
| Name | Term | Occupation etc |
|---|---|---|
| Wilhelm Hardt | 6 August 1817 – 1819 | Mining consultant |
| Werner Jacob | 8 December 1817 – 2 December 1823 | Lawyer |
| Lambert Ernst | 8 June 1835 – 1840 | Deputy Prosecutor, Court of Appeal in Liège |
| Joseph Brandès | 2 December 1823 – 1830 | School inspector |
| Mathieu Crémer | 1 February 1840 – 1889 | Judge from Verviers |
| Johann Martin Daniel Mayer | 22 April 1819 – March 1836 | Mining consultant |
| Heinrich Martins | 9 July 1836 – 9 November 1853 or 1854 | Mining consultant |
| Peter Benedict Joseph Amand von Harenne | 11 August 1852 or 1854 – 7 January 1866 | District commissioner of Eupen |
| Freiherr von der Heydt | 12 December 1866 – 1868 | Former district commissioner of Eupen |
| Edward Gülcher | 1868–1871 | District commissioner of Eupen |
| Alfred Theodor Sternickel | 18 June 1871 – April 1893 | District commissioner of Eupen |
| Fernand Jacques Bleyfuesz | 30 November 1889 – 27 March 1915 | District commissioner of Verviers |
| Alfred Jakob Bernhard Theodor Gülcher | 18 April 1893 – 1 January 1909 | District commissioner of Eupen |
| Walter Karl Maria The Losen | 13 January 1909 – 1 November 1918 | District commissioner of Eupen |
| Dr. Bayer (acting) | 27 March – 27 June 1915 | Civil commissioner of Verviers |
| Fernand Jacques Bleyfuesz | November 1918 – 10 January 1920 | District commissioner of Verviers |

=== List of mayors ===
- Arnold Timothée de Lasaulx, 1817 – 2 February 1859
- Adolf Hubert van Scherpenzeel-Thim, 2 February 1859 – 30 May 1859
- Joseph Kohl, 1 July 1859 – 7 February 1882
- Oskar Anton Bilharz, 7 February 1882 – 20 June 1885
- Jérôme Mohsen, 20 June 1885 – 20 June 1885
- Hubert Schmetz, 20 June 1885 – 15 March 1915
- Wilhelm Kyll, 29 March 1915 – 7 December 1918
- Pierre Grignard, 7 December 1918 – 10 January 1920

== See also ==
- Interhelpo
- Couto Misto
