= List of power stations in Belgium =

This page lists power stations in Belgium, as part of Belgium's electricity sector.

== Operational power plants ==
=== Fossil ===
Name	Operator	Site	Coordinates	Main fuel	Capacity (MW)
Amercoeur Power Station	Electrabel	Amercoeur	50°25′48″N 4°23′43″E	Natural gas	420MW
Drogenbos Power Station	Electrabel	Drogenbos	50°48′09″N 4°18′03″E	Natural gas	460MW
Herdersbrug Power Station	Electrabel	Herdersbrug	51°15′47″N 3°12′40″E	Natural gas	460MW
IVBO Brugge Power Station	Electrabel	IVBO Brugge	51°15′08″N 3°12′29″E	Biomass	305MW
Knippegroen Power Station	Electrabel	Knippegroen	51°09′31″N 3°48′27″E	Blast furnace gas	305MW
Lanaken Power Station	Electrabel	Lanaken Sappi	50°53′00″N 5°38′24″E	Biomass	43MW
Oorderen Power Station	Electrabel	Oorderen Bayer	51°18′57″N 4°17′19″E	Natural gas	43MW
Saint-Ghislain Power Station	Electrabel	Saint-Ghislain	50°28′18″N 3°49′31″E	Natural gas	350MW
Scheldelaan Exxonmobil Power Station	Electrabel	Scheldelaan Exxonmobil	51°15′15″N 4°20′01″E	Natural gas	140MW
Zandvliet Power Station	Electrabel	Zandvliet	51°22′11″N 4°16′00″E	Natural gas	474MW
Vilvoorde Power Station	Electrabel	Vilvoorde	50°56′29″N 4°25′28″E	Natural gas	255MW
Inesco Power Station	RWE Supply & Trading	Inesco	51°14′29″N 4°19′17″E	Natural gas	135MW
T-Power Power Station	RWE Supply & Trading	T-Power	51°03′30″N 5°06′17″E	Natural gas	425MW
Biostroom Oostende Power Station	RWE Supply & Trading	Biostoom Oostende	51°12′37″N 2°59′41″E	Biomass	19.4MW
Angeleur Power Station	Luminus	Angleur	50°37′05″N 5°34′58″E	Natural gas	178MW
Beveren Power Station	Luminus	Beveren	51°17′05″N 4°16′40″E	Biomass	86MW
Izegem Power Station	Luminus	Izegem	50°55′29″N 3°12′50″E	Natural gas	20MW
Ham Power Station	Luminus	Ham	51°03′36″N 3°44′07″E	Natural gas	116MW
Gent-Ringvaart Power Station	Luminus	Gent-Ringvaart	51°06′18″N 3°43′33″E	Natural gas	385MW
Jemeppe-sur-Sambre Power Station	Luminus	Jemeppe-sur-Sambre	50°26′52″N 4°39′40″E	Natural gas	106MW
Seraign Power Station	Luminus	Seraign	50°36′11″N 5°29′29″E	Natural gas	170MW
Marcinelle Power Station	Total Direct Energie	Marcinelle	50°24′50″N 4°24′24″E	Natural gas	413MW

=== Hydroelectric ===
Operator	Station	Location	Coordinates	Type	Capacity (MW)
Electrabel	Bévercé Lake Robertville	Malmedy	50°26′20″N 6°02′20″E	classical	9.2
Electrabel	Lake Bütgenbach	Bütgenbach	50°26′10″N 6°12′37″E	classical	1.8
Electrabel	Heid-de-Goreux	Aywaille	50°27′22″N 5°43′04″E	classical	8.1
Electrabel	La-Vierre	Chiny	49°43′59″N 5°22′37″E	classical	1.9
Luminus	Ampsin-Neuville	Amay	50°32′03″N 5°17′48″E	classical	10
Luminus	Ivoz-Ramet	Liège	50°35′35″N 5°27′41″E	classical	10
Luminus	Andenne	Andenne	50°29′31″N 5°04′12″E	classical	9
Luminus	Monsin	Liège	50°39′11″N 5°37′53″E	classical	18
Luminus	Lixhe	Visé	50°45′06″N 5°41′16″E	classical	20
Luminus	Floriffoux	Namur	50°26′48″N 4°46′25″E	Flow	1
Luminus	Grands-Malades	Namur	50°27′57″N 4°53′58″E	classical	5

=== Storage ===
Operator	Station	Location	Coordinates	Type	Capacity (MW / MWh)
Electrabel	Coo-Trois-Ponts Hydroelectric Power Station	Stavelot	50°23′12″N 5°51′26″E	Pumped storage	1164 /
TotalEnergies	Plate Taille	Lake Eau d'Heure	50°11′19″N 4°23′11″E	Pumped storage	143 /
Engie	Vilvoorde gas		50°56′N 4°25′E	Battery	100 MW / 400 MWh

=== Solar ===
Most of the 10 GW solar power in Belgium is residential but there are some large solar industrial solar power plants as well:

Name	Operator	Site	Coordinates	Type	Capacity (MW)	Date Connected
Gallée Energy Power Plant	Gallée Energy 1	St. Ghislaine, Hainaut	??	Photovoltaic	??	?? 2020-03-04

=== Nuclear ===
Name	Site	Coordinates	Type	Capacity (MW)	Date connected
Doel Nuclear Power Station, Unit 1	Doel	51°19′21″N 4°15′40″E	PWR	433MW	1974/08/28
Doel Nuclear Power Station, Unit 2	Doel	51°19′23″N 4°15′41″E	PWR	433MW	1975/08/21
Doel Nuclear Power Station, Unit 3	Doel	51°19′27″N 4°15′29″E	PWR	1006MW	1982/06/23
Doel Nuclear Power Station, Unit 4	Doel	51°19′33″N 4°15′26″E	PWR	1038MW	1985/04/08
Tihange Nuclear Power Station, Unit 1	Huy	50°32′05″N 5°16′17″E	PWR	962MW	1975/03/07
Tihange Nuclear Power Station, Unit 2	Huy	50°32′08″N 5°16′24″E	PWR	1008MW	1982/10/13
Tihange Nuclear Power Station, Unit 3	Huy	50°32′05″N 5°16′39″E	PWR	1054MW	1985/06/15

=== Wind ===
==== Wind offshore ====
Name	Location	Province	Coordinates	Capacity (MW)	Turbines	Tower (m)	Rotor (m)	Operator	Prod. start	Notes
C-Power	Thorntonbank	Offshore	51°34′00″N 3°00′00″E	325	54					
Belwind	Bligh bank	Offshore	51°39′36″N 2°48′00″E	171	56	72	90	Parkwind NV/Meevind	2012	
Northwind	Lodewijk Bank	Offshore	51°37′09″N 2°55′06″E	216	72			Parkwind NV		
Bellwind II/NobelWind	Zeebrugge	Offshore	51°40′N 2°49′E	165	50	72	112	Parkwind NV	2017	
Rentel	between Northwind and C-Power	Offshore	51°34′33″N 2°55′08″E	307	42			Lampiris/Otary RS		
Norther	southeast of Thornton Bank	Offshore	51°30′49″N 2°59′29″E	370	44					
Northwester 2		Offshore	51°41′10″N 2°45′34″E	219	23		164			
SeaMade SeaStar		Offshore	51°43′N 2°44′E	252	30			Otary RS		
SeaMade Mermaid		Offshore	51°38′N 2°52′E	235.2	28		167	Otary RS		

==== Onshore wind ====
===== Flemish Region onshore wind =====
Name	Location	Province	Coordinates	Capacity (MW)	Turbines	Tower (m)	Rotor (m)	Operator	Prod. start	Notes
Zephiros	Arendonk		51°17′51″N 5°06′03″E	16.1	7	108	82	airenergy	2011	
Puurs	Puurs	Antwerp	51°04′46″N 4°21′07″E	6.9	3	108	82	airenergy	2011	
Middelkerke	Middelkerke	West-Flanders	51°12′03″N 2°45′47″E	1.56	2	55 and 60	57 and 52	Aspiravi	1999	
Noorderkempen	Brecht, Wuustwezel, Hoogstraten	Antwerp	51°20′56″N 4°37′12″E	22.1	10			Aspiravi	2000	
Kapelle-op-den-Bos	Kapelle-op-den-Bos	Flanders	50°59′44″N 4°22′24″E	1.2	3	55	34	Aspiravi	2001	
Brugge	Bruges	West-Flanders	51°12′34″N 3°13′29″E	4.2	7	55	48	Aspiravi	2002	
Transeeklo	Eeklo	East-Flanders	51°10′47″N 3°31′59″E	1.8	1	86	70	Aspiravi	2002	
Puurs(A12/Rupeltunnel)	Puurs	Antwerp	51°04′46″N 4°21′07″E	4	2	100	80	Aspiravi	2006	
Lommel-Balendijk	Balendijk	Limburg	51°12′43″N 5°15′32″E	8	4	100	80	Aspiravi	2007	
Zeebrugge	Bruges	West Flanders	51°18′58″N 3°11′09″E	12	14			Aspiravi	2009	
Izegem Bosmolens	Izegem	West Flanders	50°55′41″N 3°11′59″E	4.6	2	98	71	Aspiravi	2009	
Hasselt Godsheide	Hasselt	Limburg	50°56′22″N 5°21′56″E	4	2	105	90	Aspiravi	2010	
Diest-Bekkevoort	Diest, Bekkevoort	Flemish Brabant	50°57′01″N 5°03′08″E	11.5	5			Aspiravi	2011	
Halen	Halen	Limburg	50°56′49″N 5°02′49″E	11.5	5			Aspiravi	2011	
Izegem-Mandel	Izegem	West Flanders	50°56′07″N 3°10′34″E	4	2			Aspiravi	2011	
Maaseik	Maaseik	Limburg	51°05′56″N 5°41′04″E	6	3			Aspiravi	2011	
Brecht	Brecht		51°20′59″N 4°38′16″E	6	3	105	45	Aspiravi	2012	
Beringen	Beringen	Limburg	51°04′09″N 5°11′43″E	4.6	2	85	35	Aspiravi	2012	
Hasselt Centrale Werkplaatsen	Hasselt	Limburg	50°55′52″N 5°20′16″E	4.6	2	113	70	Aspiravi	2012	
Wuustwezel-Hoogstraten	Wuustwezel, Hoogstraten		51°23′22″N 4°35′28″E	16.1	7	108	82	Aspiravi	2012	
Beringen Albertkanaal	Beringen	Limburg	51°04′09″N 5°11′43″E	4.6	2			Aspiravi	2012	
Beringen Ravenshout	Beringen	Limburg	51°04′03″N 5°10′38″E	2	1			Aspiravi	2014	
Bilzen-Riemst	Riemst	Limburg	50°52′19″N 5°31′00″E	10.4	3			Aspiravi	2017	
Dilsen-Stokkem	Dilsen-Stokkem	Limburg	51°02′53″N 5°41′55″E	6	3			Aspiravi	2015	
Genk North	Genk	Limburg	50°57′44″N 5°30′11″E	4	2			Aspiravi	2017	
Genk South II	Genk	Limburg	50°56′45″N 5°28′49″E	8	4			Aspiravi	2015	
Ham Albertkanaal I	Limburg	Limburg	51°05′41″N 5°07′10″E	4	2			Aspiravi	2013	
Ham Albertkanaal II	Limburg	Limburg	51°05′41″N 5°07′10″E	4.1	2			Aspiravi	2016	
Lommel Kristalpark	Lommel	Limburg	51°12′51″N 5°16′14″E	10	5			Aspiravi	2014	
Lommel Kolenhaven	Lommel	Limburg	51°12′11″N 5°15′33″E	4	2			Aspiravi	2015	
Maasmechelen Oude Bunders	Maasmechelen	Limburg	50°58′47″N 5°42′07″E	4	2			Aspiravi	2015	
Riemst E313	Riemst, Limburg	Limburg	50°48′38″N 5°31′10″E	10.4	3			Aspiravi	2017	
Tessenderlo Ravenshout	Tessenderlo	Limburg	51°04′20″N 5°09′56″E	2	1			Aspiravi	2013	
Tessenderlo Schoonhees	Tessenderlo	Limburg	51°03′17″N 5°06′45″E	9	3			Aspiravi	2014	
Bruges Pathoekeweg retrofit	Bruges	West Flanders	51°15′47″N 3°12′47″E	11.5	5			Aspiravi	2015	
Gistel	Gistel	West Flanders	51°10′02″N 2°58′02″E	9.2	4			Aspiravi	2007	
Ypres	Ypres	West Flanders	50°50′57″N 2°52′40″E	6.9	3			Aspiravi	2009	
Antwerp Left bank	Antwerp	Antwerp	51°13′10″N 4°24′09″E	45	15			Aspiravi	2015	
Antwerp Left bank II	Antwerp	Antwerp	51°13′10″N 4°24′09″E	3.2	1			Aspiravi	2016	
Antwerp Left bank III	Antwerp	Antwerp	51°13′10″N 4°24′09″E	12	4			Aspiravi	2017	
Antwerp Left bank IV	Antwerp	Antwerp	51°13′10″N 4°24′09″E	3.2	1			Aspiravi		
Antwerp Right bank I	Antwerp	Antwerp	51°13′10″N 4°24′09″E	15	7			Aspiravi	2009	
Antwerp Right bank II	Antwerp	Antwerp	51°13′10″N 4°24′09″E	11.75	5			Aspiravi	2014	
Hoogstraten E19	Hoogstraten	Antwerp	51°28′24″N 4°43′52″E	6.9	2			Aspiravi	2017	
Diest	Diest	Flemish Brabant	50°59′23″N 5°03′01″E	3.4	1			Aspiravi		
Assenede	Assenede	East Flanders	51°13′47″N 3°41′30″E	12	6			Aspiravi	2016	
Dendermonde	Dendermonde	East Flanders	51°01′32″N 4°06′07″E	2	1			Aspiravi	2013	
Eeklo	Eeklo	East Flanders	51°10′47″N 3°31′59″E	1.8	1			Aspiravi	2002	
Haaltert	Haaltert	East Flanders	50°52′40″N 4°01′46″E	9.2	4			Aspiravi	2015	
Zele	Zele	East Flanders	51°03′23″N 4°04′13″E	6.9	3			Aspiravi		
Ieperlee	Ypres	West-Flanders	50°52′47″N 2°52′44″E	20.7	9	83.3	71	Aspiravi (3); Electrawinds (2); Colruyt (2); Luminus (2)	2009	
De put	Nieuwkapelle		50°59′58″N 2°48′00″E	1.6	2			BeauVent	2005	
Halle	Halle	Flemish-Brabant	51°29′49″N 11°58′08″E	1.65	1			Colruyt	1999	
Eeklo	Eeklo	East-Flanders	51°10′47″N 3°31′59″E	4.2	2			Ecopower	2002	
Eeklo2	Eeklo	East-Flanders	51°10′47″N 3°31′59″E	4.6	2			Ecopower	2011	
Melle	Melle	East-Flanders	50°58′51″N 3°49′03″E	6.9	3	98	82	Luminus	2009	
Hamme	Hamme		51°04′26″N 4°08′07″E	4.6	2	98	82	Luminus	2011	
Kluizendok	Ghent	East-Flanders	51°09′46″N 3°46′49″E	22	11	98	71	Luminus; Ecopower	2005	
Ford Genk	Genk	Limburg	50°57′58″N 5°30′08″E	4	2			Electrabel	2009	
Bobbejaanland	Kasterlee		51°11′58″N 4°54′18″E	0.66	1			Electrabel	2001	
Schelle	Schelle		51°07′31″N 4°19′14″E	4.5	3			Electrabel	2001	
Rodenhuize	Ghent (Desteldonk)	East-Flanders	51°08′50″N 3°47′31″E	4.1	2			Electrabel	2003	
Wondelgem	Ghent (Wondelgem)	East-Flanders	51°05′26″N 3°42′58″E	4	2			Electrabel	2003	
Volvo Trucks	Ghent (Oostakker)	East-Flanders	51°05′26″N 3°42′58″E	6	3			Electrabel	2007	
Izegem	Izegem	West-Flanders	50°55′41″N 3°11′59″E	4	2			Electrabel	2008	
BASF	Zandvliet		51°21′48″N 4°17′49″E	12	6			Electrabel	2008	
Volvo Cars	Ghent (Oostakker)	East-Flanders	51°05′59″N 3°45′51″E	6.15	3			Electrabel	2010	
Celanese	Lanaken	Limburg	50°52′48″N 5°39′19″E	8	2			Electrabel	2011	
Zeebrugge	Zeebrugge	West-Flanders	50°18′58″N 3°11′09″E	4.1	2			Electrabel	2011	
DS Textile	Dendermonde	East-Flanders	51°01′32″N 4°06′07″E	4.7	2			Electrabel	2011	
Brugge I	Bruges	West-Flanders	51°12′33″N 3°13′29″E	3	5	53	48	Electrawinds	2000	
Zedelgem	Zedelgem	West-Flanders	51°08′08″N 3°09′52″E	1.8	1	102	71	Electrawinds	2002	
Brugge III	Bruges	West-Flanders	51°12′33″N 3°13′29″E	12.6	7	85	71	Electrawinds	2004	
Middelkerke	Middelkerke	West-Flanders	51°11′06″N 2°49′15″E	0.8	1	65	48	Electrawinds	2007	
Evolis	Kortrijk	West-Flanders	50°49′10″N 3°15′28″E	8	4	108	82	Electrawinds	2009	
Kallo	Kallo		51°16′11″N 4°15′28″E	2	1	108	83	Electrawinds	2010	
Maldegem	Maldegem, Eeklo	East-Flanders	51°13′01″N 3°29′20″E	16.1	7	98	71	Electrawinds	2011	
Berlare	Berlare		51°12′33″N 3°26′55″E	9.2	4	108	82	Electrawinds	2012	
Braemland I	Kruibeke		51°01′03″N 4°00′21″E	6	3	100	80	Fortech	2005	
Braemland II	Beveren	East-Flanders	51°10′43″N 4°16′43″E	4	2	100	82	Fortech	2009	
Duikeldam	Beveren	East-Flanders	51°10′53″N 4°16′35″E	8.2	4	100	92.5	Fortech	2012	
Lommel-Umicore	Lommel	Limburg	51°12′11″N 5°15′33″E	8	4	100	80	GISLOM	2005	
Gistelwind	Gistel		51°09′23″N 2°58′03″E	13.5	6	85	71	GISLOM (4); Electrawinds (1); BeauVent-Ecopower (1)	2007	
DS Textile	Kruibeke		51°10′14″N 4°18′44″E	2.3	1	98	82	KT Projects	2011	
Nike Wind Park	Laakdal		51°05′05″N 5°01′51″E	9	6	111.5	77	Seeba	2006	
Antwerpen Rechteroever	Antwerp	Antwerp	51°13′10″N 4°24′09″E	15	7			VLEEMO	2004	
industrieterrein rotem	Dilsen-Stokkem	Limburg	51°02′38″N 5°41′46″E	12	6			Storm energy e.a.	2015	
ICO Windpark	Zeebrugge	West Flanders	51°19′57″N 3°13′15″E	44	11			Electrabel	2020	
Arcelor Mittal Gent	Ghent	East-Flanders	50°25′13″N 4°04′34″E	33	11			Electrabel		
Greensky			50°42′54″N 5°03′43″E	32	11			Electrabel		
Zeebrugge	Zeebrugge	West-Flanders	51°18′54″N 3°14′11″E	12	4			Eneco		

===== Walloon Region onshore wind =====
Name	Location	Province	Coordinates	Capacity (MW)	Turbines	Tower (m)	Rotor (m)	Operator	Prod. start	Notes
Theux			50°32′06″N 5°48′51″E	0.33	1			A+ Energies		
Marbais			50°32′14″N 4°30′54″E	16	2			airenergy		
Marbais extension			50°31′59″N 4°30′14″E	6	3			airenergy		
Gouvy			50°11′58″N 5°56′07″E	11.5	5			airenergy		
Mettet / Fosse-la-Ville 2			50°22′12″N 4°38′56″E	9.2	4			air1energy		
Eghezée, Perwez 4			50°36′23″N 4°47′30″E	2.5	1			airenergy		
La Bruyère, Eghezeée			50°35′34″N 4°54′13″E	10	5			airenergy		
Mettet			50°19′12″N 4°39′28″E	22	11			airenergy		
Perwez extension 2			50°36′41″N 4°47′49″E	5	2			airenergy		
Campagne Spêches extension			50°32′49″N 4°37′34″E	3	2			airenergy		
Perwez			50°36′23″N 4°47′30″E	7.5	5			airenergy		
Pont-à-Celles			50°32′40″N 4°20′45″E	16	8			airenergy		
Amblève			50°20′49″N 6°13′22″E	10	5			Aspiravi		
Perwez		Walloon Brbant	50°36′23″N 4°47′30″E	4.5	3			Aspiravi		
Bastogne		Luxemburg	50°00′02″N 5°42′55″E	6	3			Aspiravi		
Le Roeulx		Hainaut	50°29′24″N 4°04′47″E	9.2				Aspiravi		
Amel		Liege	50°20′49″N 6°13′22″E	6	5			Aspiravi		
Villers 1			50°34′48″N 5°14′24″E	9	6			Luminus		
Villers 2 (Wanze, Vinalmont)			50°34′48″N 5°14′24″E	3	2			Luminus		
Villers 3 (Verlaine)			50°34′48″N 5°14′24″E	10	5			Luminus		
Berloz			50°41′50″N 5°11′14″E	6	3			Luminus		
Walcourt			50°15′14″N 4°26′06″E	9	6			Luminus		
Yvoir-Dinant			50°17′46″N 4°59′02″E	12	6			Luminus		
Fernelmont			50°32′00″N 4°57′44″E	4.6	2			Luminus		
Fernelmont 2			50°32′00″N 4°57′44″E	2.3	1			Luminus		
Ciney-Sovet			50°17′47″N 5°02′11″E	20.25	6			Luminus		
Bütgenbach			50°25′36″N 6°12′15″E	8	4			Electrabel		
Bullange			50°23′38″N 6°19′12″E	12	6			Electrabel		
Villeroux Vaux-sur-Sûre			49°59′20″N 5°39′57″E	12	6			Electrawinds		
Leuze			50°35′58″N 3°38′20″E	20.5	10			Elsa		
Seneffe			50°30′46″N 4°15′47″E	2.3	1			Energie 2030		
Saint Vith			50°17′28″N 6°05′09″E	0.5	1			Energie 2030		
Chevetogne			50°13′17″N 5°08′47″E	0.8	1			Energie 2030		
Baileux			50°01′43″N 4°22′34″E	10	4			Green Wind		
Froidchapelle			50°12′57″N 4°19′56″E	25	10			Green Wind		
Cerfontaine			50°10′30″N 4°29′39″E	22	11			Green Wind		
Boussu-en-Fagne (Couvin)			50°04′15″N 4°28′56″E	2	1			Lampiris Wind		
Campagne Spppêches			50°32′49″N 4°37′34″E	6	4			Les Vents de l'Ornoi		
Hoqugné Chivremont			50°24′17″N 6°05′50″E	9.2	4			Mobilae		
Saint Vith			50°17′28″N 6°05′09″E	10	5			NPG Energy		
Flamière			50°52′23″N 4°18′34″E	7.5	6			RPC		
Saint Ode			50°01′38″N 5°35′33″E	15	6			RPC		
Bastogne Bourcy			50°03′32″N 5°48′30″E	17.5	7			RPC		
Dour 1			50°24′00″N 3°46′58″E	14	7			Ventis		
Dour 2			50°24′00″N 3°46′58″E	8	4			Ventis		
Dour 3			50°24′00″N 3°46′58″E	6.9	3			Ventis		
Tournai			50°36′20″N 3°23′16″E	16.1	7			Ventis		
Quévy			50°22′50″N 3°57′19″E	18	9			Ventis		
Mesnil-Eglise-Finnevaux			50°09′37″N 4°55′44″E	1.39	2			Ventis		
Mesnil-Eglise			50°09′54″N 4°57′49″E	0.8	1			Vents d'Houyet		
Ghislenghien			50°39′10″N 3°51′54″E	2	1			Vents d'Houyet		
Levant de Mons			50°26′04″N 3°54′05″E	66	11			We-Power		
Floreffe Fosse-la-Ville			50°22′12″N 4°38′56″E	16.1	7			Windvision		
Bièvre 2			49°57′11″N 5°01′14″E	14	7			Windvision		
Estinnes			50°25′13″N 4°04′34″E	81,2	11			Windvision		

== Decommissioned power plants ==
Name	Site	Coordinates	Type	Former capacity (MW)	Date connected	Date decommissioned	Note
Mol BR-3	Mol	51°13′09″N 5°06′08″E	Nuclear (PWR)	10MW	1962/10/25	1987	Research reactor

== See also ==
- List of power stations in Europe
- List of largest power stations in the world
