= List of lakes of Belgium =

This is a list of lakes of Belgium, along with brief details, including their names in French, Dutch and German.

== Lakes ==
| Name | Region | Province | French name | Dutch name | German name | Surface Area (ha) |
|---|---|---|---|---|---|---|
| Donkmeer | Flanders | East Flanders | Lac de Donk | Donkmeer | | 86 |
| Grand Large | Wallonia | Hainaut | Grand Large | | | 40 |
| Hazewinkel | Flanders | Antwerp | Hazewinkel | Hazewinkel | | 65 |
| Ixelles Ponds | Brussels | — | Étangs d'Ixelles | Vijvers van Elsene | | |
| Lake Bütgenbach | Wallonia | Liège | Lac de Bütgenbach | Meer van Bütgenbach | Bütgenbach Stausee | 120 |
| Lake Eau d'Heure | Wallonia | Hainaut / Namur | Lac de l'Eau d'Heure | Meren van het water van de Heure | | 617 |
| Lake Eupen | Wallonia | Liège | Lac d'Eupen | Meer van Eupen | Eupen Stausee | 126 |
| Lake Genval | Flanders / Wallonia | Flemish Brabant / Walloon Brabant | Lac de Genval | Meer van Genval | | 18 |
| Lake Gileppe | Wallonia | Liège | Lac de la Gileppe | Meer van de Gileppe | | 130 |
| Lake Kraenepoel | Flanders | East Flanders | Lac de Kraenepoel | Kraenepoelmeer | | 22 |
| Lake Neufchâteau | Wallonia | Luxembourg | Lac de Neufchâteau | Meer van Neufchâteau | | 6 |
| Lake Nisramont | Wallonia | Luxembourg | Lac de Nisramont | Meer van Nisramont | | 47 |
| Lake Robertville | Wallonia | Liège | Lac de Robertville | Meer van Robertville | | 62 |
| Lake Ry de Rome | Wallonia | Namur | Lac de Ry de Rome | Meer van de Ry de Rome | | 25 |
| Lake Schulens | Flanders | Limburg | Lac de Schulens | Schulensmeer | | 95 |
| Lake Virelles | Wallonia | Hainaut | Lac de Virelles | Meer van Virelles | | 125 |
| Lake Warfaaz | Wallonia | Liège | Lac de Warfaaz | Meer van Warfaaz | | 8 |

== See also ==
- List of rivers of Belgium
