= Robertville, Belgium =

Section of Waimes, Wallonia, Belgium

Coordinates: 50°27′N 6°07′E

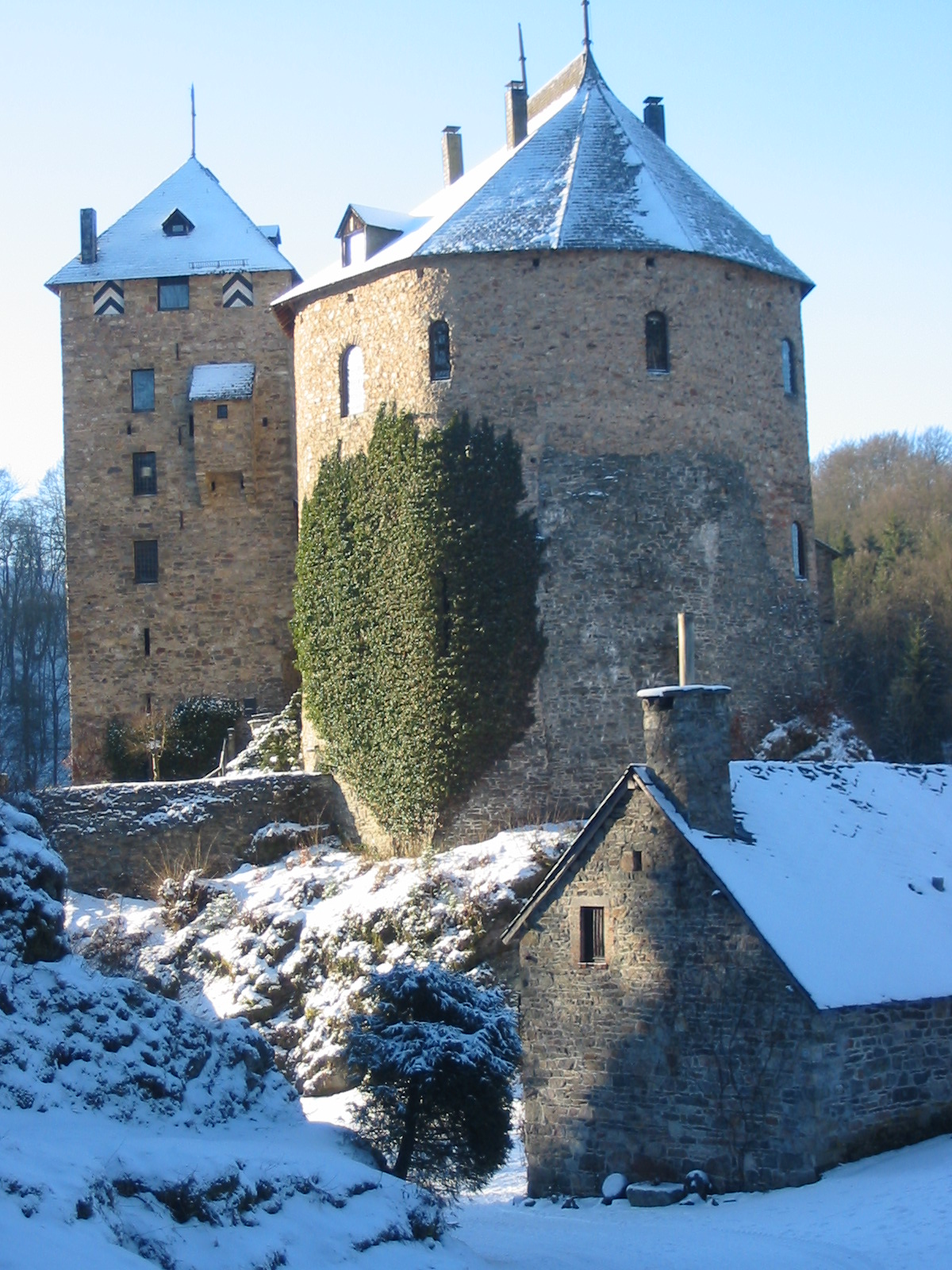
Reinhardstein castle

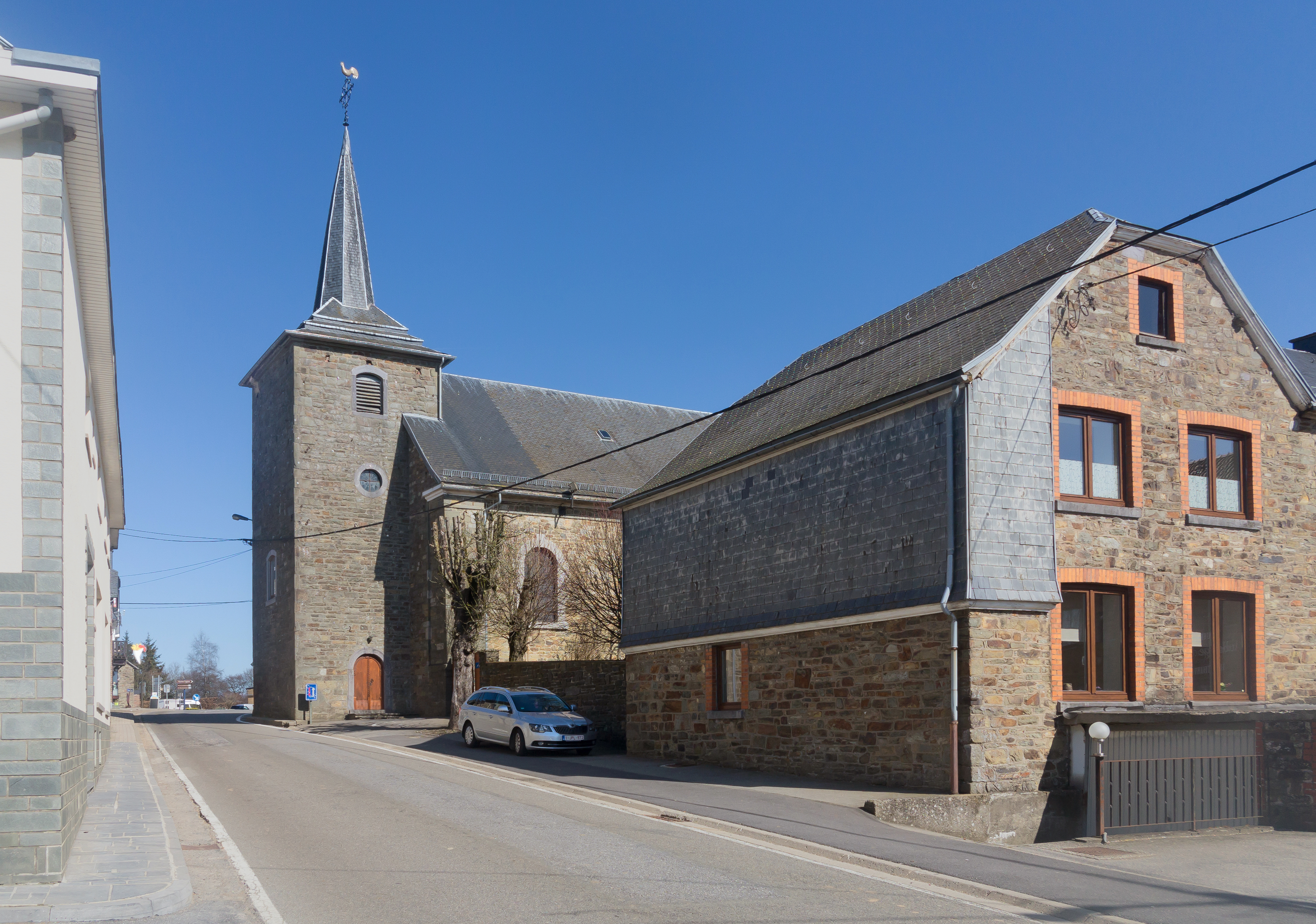
Church; l'église Saint-Joseph

Robertville (Walloon: Li Rbiveye (locally as Rebîveye or Rubîveye)) is a village of Wallonia and a district of the municipality of Waimes, located in the province of Liège, Belgium.

On 1 January 2005 it had 2402 inhabitants.

It was a separate municipality (formed in 1922 by the fusion of the villages of Robertville, Ovifat, Sourbrodt and Outrewarche) before the 1977 merger of the municipalities. Prior to that date it was also the highest municipality in Belgium, marked by the Signal de Botrange, at 694 metres (2,277 feet).

It is the site of Reinhardstein Castle. It is also known for its dam across the Warche, built in 1928, which created the 62-hectare (150-acre) Lake Robertville to provide the Malmedy region with drinking water and to supplement the supply of electricity to Malmedy's now district of Bévercé.

== Sources ==
- http://www.robertville.be/
