= Nidrum =

Town in Bütgenbach, Belgium

Coordinates: 50°26′40″N 6°11′47″E

Nidrum is a village in the municipality of Bütgenbach in East Belgium. Nidrum is located about 2 kilometers north of Bütgenbach and has a population 854 inhabitants.

== History ==
The history of the village can be traced back to the early 15th century.
