= Robertville =

Robertville may refer to:

- Robertville, Belgium
- Robertville, New Brunswick
- Robertville, South Carolina
