= Losheimergraben =

Hamlet on the Belgian-German border

Coordinates: 50°22′48″N 6°20′33″E

Losheimergraben is a hamlet belonging to Manderfeld, which itself is a submunicipality of the Belgian municipality of Büllingen and the German municipality of Hellenthal. It is situated on both sides of the Belgian-German border. The hamlet consists of a few houses and a roundabout where the N626 to Manderfeld and the N632 to Büllingen meet. German Federal Road 265 from Schleiden to Prüm is connected to this roundabout by two connecting roads.

== History ==
In 1912, a deep cut was dug on the southern flank of the Weisse Stein on what was then German territory for the construction of what later became Belgian railway line 45A. The railway opened in July 1912. Losheimergraben refers to a graben (dug-out cut) near Losheim, a village a few kilometers to the east. Losheimergraben station was located along the railway line. It is unclear whether the hamlet of Losheimergraben already existed before 1912.

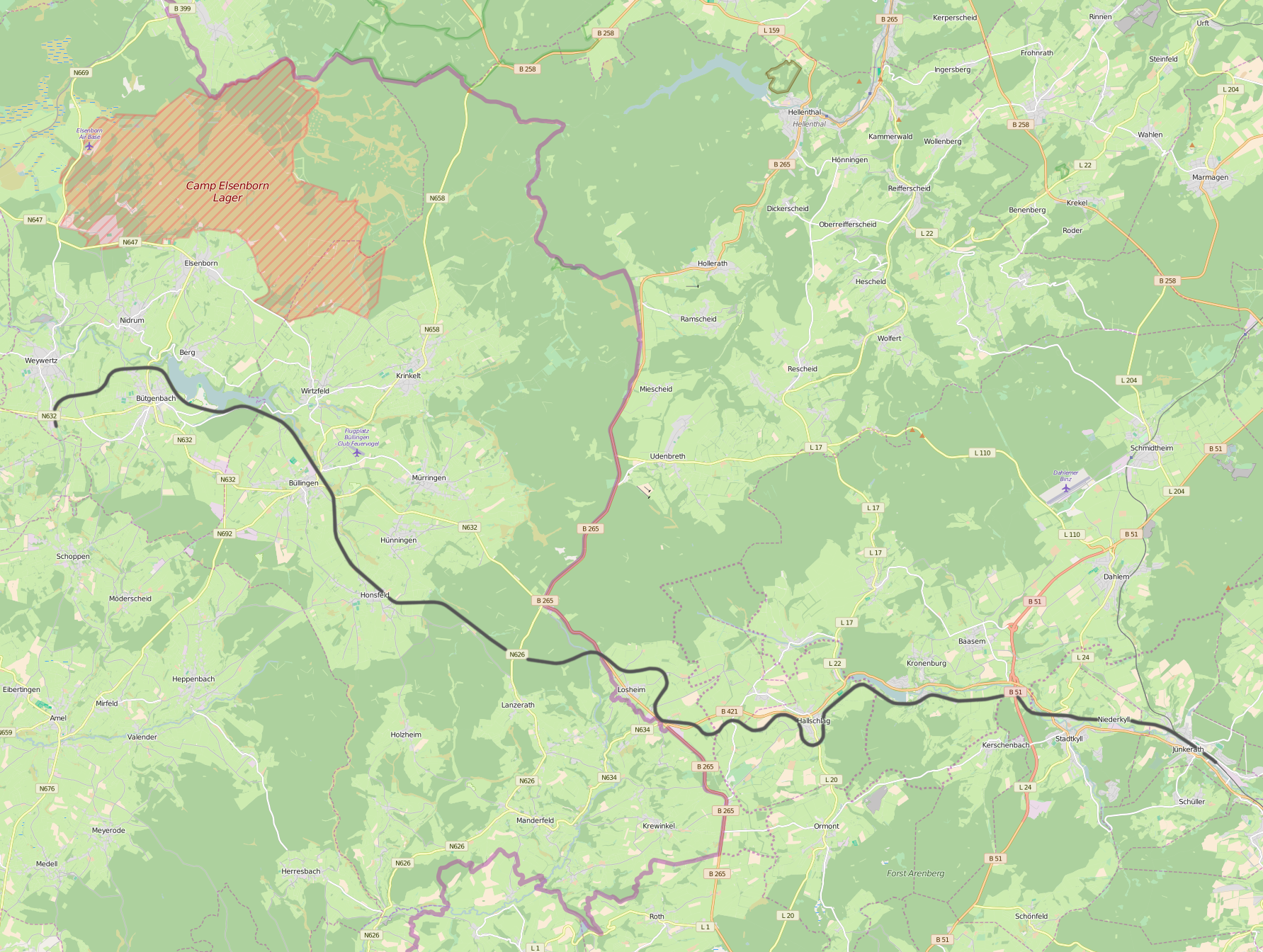
Map of the railway line 45A.

The land around the present-day hamlet of Losheimergraben was German until 1920, when half of it was assigned to Belgium. The hamlet grew up around the border crossing on the road between Waimes and Büllingen in the northwest and Prüm and Trier in the southeast. After World War II, Belgium annexed a German portion of Losheimergraben again in 1949, along with the village of Losheim. In 1958, several German towns annexed in 1949 under a new Belgian-German border treaty were returned to Germany (including the village of Losheim and Bildchen). However, this did not happen for the traffic roundabout, which remained entirely Belgian. The border post to Belgium has since been closed, and only a few flags remain to remind us of the—now open—border.

Losheimergraben is known for a chance encounter—on December 16, 1944—between an American reconnaissance unit and a German paratrooper unit. The reconnaissance unit, although not equipped as a combat unit, managed to inflict heavy losses on the paratrooper unit, which was crucial for the further course of the Ardennes Offensive. A plaque commemorating this event is located on the N626 in Belgian territory.

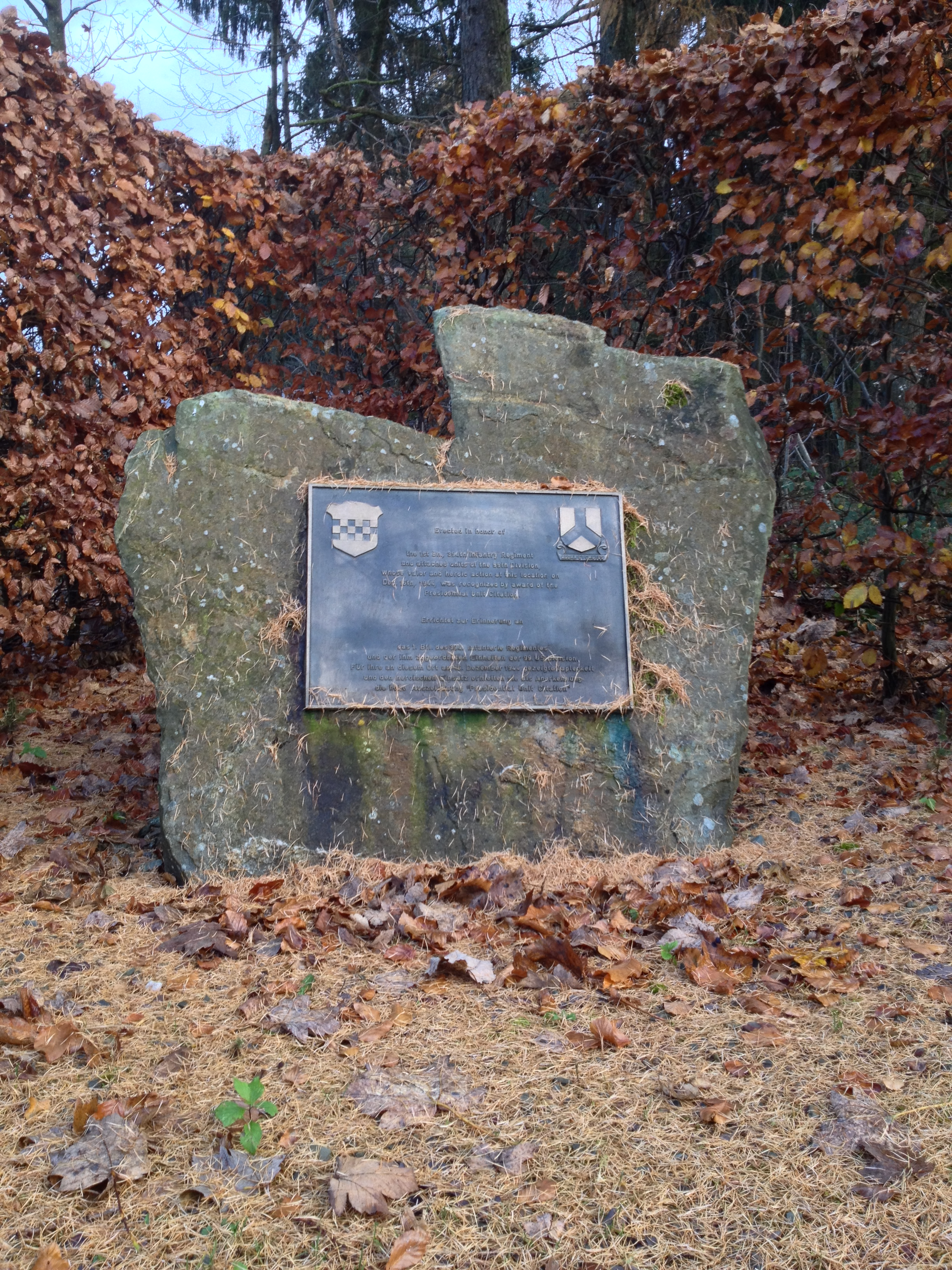
Monument for the 394th American regiment

== Nature and landscape ==
Losheimergraben is located at an altitude of approximately 670 meters above sea level. The Kyll, Warche, and Our rivers rise near the hamlet. Losheimergraben lies on the watershed between the Meuse (from the Warche) and the Rhine (from the Kyll and Our).

== Sports and recreation ==
With sufficient snowfall, there are three cross-country ski trails, and ski rentals are available on site. It is one of the snowiest places in the Ardennes.

== Nearby villages ==
Losheim, Udenbreth, Hünningen, Mürringen, Lanzerath
