= List of protected heritage sites in Waimes =

This table shows an overview of the protected heritage sites in the Walloon city Waimes. This list is part of Belgium's national heritage.

Object	Year/architect	Town/section	Address	Coordinates	Number^{?}	Image
The square base of the column of Hauptmann ^{(nl)} ^{(fr)}		Weismes		50.499374°N 6.095017°E	63080-CLT-0001-01 Info	De vierkante basis van de zuil van Hauptmann
The column called "Boulte" ^{(nl)} ^{(fr)}		Weismes		50.518177°N 6.064690°E	63080-CLT-0002-01 Info	De zuil genaamd "Boulté"
The marker Luxembourg-Stavelot in the forest of Sourbrodt ^{(nl)} ^{(fr)}		Weismes		50.490808°N 6.108447°E	63080-CLT-0003-01 Info	De grenspaal Luxembourg-Stavelot in het bos van Sourbrodt
The marker Luxembourg-Stavelot near Botrange ^{(nl)} ^{(fr)}		Weismes		50.500608°N 6.093961°E	63080-CLT-0004-01 Info	
Boundary-Limbourg Luxembourg-Stavelot called "Pierre à trois coins" ^{(nl)} ^{(fr)}		Weismes		50.503924°N 6.090818°E	63080-CLT-0005-01 Info	Grenspaal Limbourg-Luxembourg-Stavelot genaamd "Pierre à trois coins"
Boundary Luxembourg-Stavelot ^{(nl)} ^{(fr)}		Weismes		50.508262°N 6.084572°E	63080-CLT-0006-01 Info	Grenspaal Luxembourg-Stavelot
Boundary-Limbourg and Luxembourg between Wez Waidages ^{(nl)} ^{(fr)}		Weismes		50.515882°N 6.087160°E	63080-CLT-0007-01 Info	
Boundary Tranchot called "Pyramide" ^{(nl)} ^{(fr)}		Weismes		50.501644°N 6.092459°E	63080-CLT-0008-01 Info	Grenspaal Tranchot, genaamd "Pyramide"
Boundary T.P. ^{(nl)} ^{(fr)}		Weismes		50.501628°N 6.092606°E	63080-CLT-0009-01 Info	Grenspaal T.P.
Hill and signal Baltia ^{(nl)} ^{(fr)}		Weismes		50.501729°N 6.092615°E	63080-CLT-0010-01 Info	Heuvel en signaal Baltia
The choir of the Church of St. Wendelin ^{(nl)} ^{(fr)}		Weismes	Sourbrodt	50.472749°N 6.119332°E	63080-CLT-0011-01 Info	Het koor van de kerk Saint-Wendelin
The lime tree at a place called "Tiou" ^{(nl)} ^{(fr)}		Weismes	Champagne-Gueuzaine	50.426309°N 6.129734°E	63080-CLT-0012-01 Info	
Ensemble of the Reinhardstein Castle and the valley of the Warche ^{(nl)} ^{(fr)}		Weismes		50.447729°N 6.079665°E	63080-CLT-0016-01 Info	Ensemble van het kasteel van Reinhardstein en de vallei van de Warche
Boundary-Limbourg Luxembourg, in Wez, near Helle ^{(nl)} ^{(fr)}		Weismes		50.522744°N 6.085483°E	63080-CLT-0017-01 Info	
Boundary B-W-KN ^{(nl)} ^{(fr)}		Weismes		50.521841°N 6.085719°E	63080-CLT-0018-01 Info	
Boundary B p.155 ^{(nl)} ^{(fr)}		Weismes		50.519177°N 6.066887°E	63080-CLT-0019-01 Info	
Boundary B p.156 ^{(nl)} ^{(fr)}		Weismes		50.519616°N 6.073005°E	63080-CLT-0020-01 Info	
Boundary B-P.157 ^{(nl)} ^{(fr)}		Weismes		50.521793°N 6.086186°E	63080-CLT-0021-01 Info	
Ensemble of several historical elements and the environment on the territory of the sectionn Jalhay, Baelen, Waimes and Malmedy ^{(nl)} ^{(fr)}		Weismes		50.525604°N 6.044209°E	63080-CLT-0022-01 Info	Ensemble van diverse historische elementen en de omgeving op het grondgebied van de sectionn Jalhay, Baelen, Waimes en Malmédy

== See also ==
- List of protected heritage sites in Liège (province)
