= Reinhardstein Castle =

Castle in Liège Province, Belgium

- Château de Reinhardstein (French)
- Ovifat, Liège Province, Wallonia, Belgium
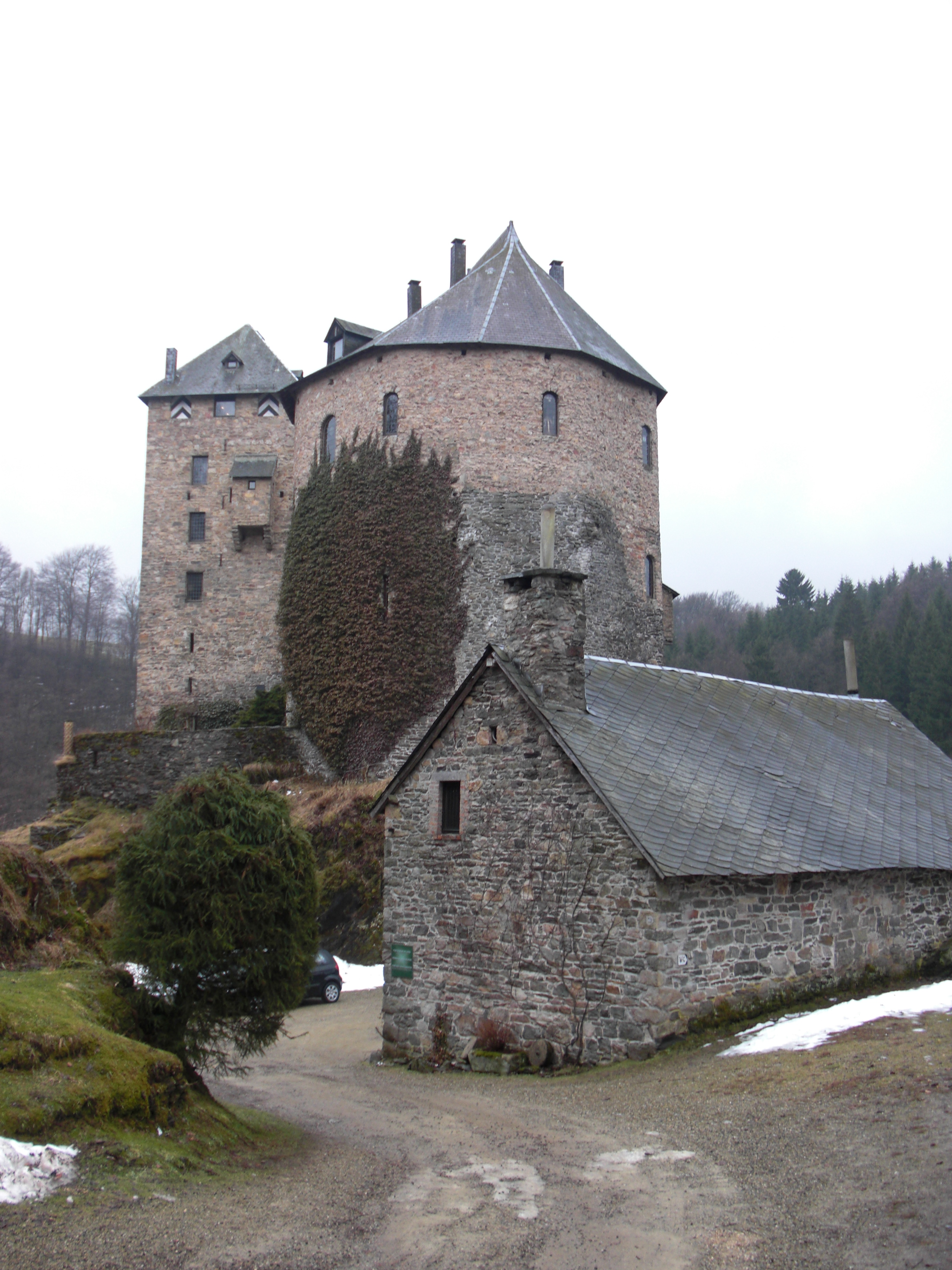

Site information
- Type: Castle, stronghold
- Open to the public: yes

Location
- Coordinates: 50°27′07″N 6°06′07″E

Site history
- Built: 1354
- Built by: Reinhard of Weismes
- Materials: red brick, white sandstone

Reinhardstein Castle (Walloon: Tchestea di Rénastène; French: Château de Reinhardstein; German: Burg Reinhardstein) is a castle of Wallonia in the village of Ovifat, in the Warche valley of Liège Province, Belgium.

The stronghold was built in 1354 for Wenceslaus of Luxembourg, while still Count, by his vassal Reinhard of Weismes. It sits on a rocky outcrop in the river valley and is now surrounded by forest. By inheritance and marriage, it passed successively into the hands of the Nesselrode, Nassau, Schwartzenberg families and finally from 1550 to 1812 the property of the Counts of Metternich, except between 1795 and 1798 when the French revolutionary administration confiscated it. Franz Georg Karl Count of Metternich-Winnenburg-Beilstein sold the family estate in 1812 to a building materials dealer. From 1815 to 1919 the area belonged to Prussia. The Prussian administration immediately halted the demolition and attempted for the first time to protect the monument. After the Treaty of Versailles (1919) it became Belgian territory. In the 19th century it was nearly destroyed by quarrying but in 1969 the castle was thoroughly renovated under the impulse of the new owner Professor Jean Overloop. After the reconstruction, he continued to live there until his death in 1994. His wife and daughter, who inherited the castle after his death, donated it to a non-profit organization.

The castle is inhabited but accessible to tourists. There is also a picturesque walking route along the castle.

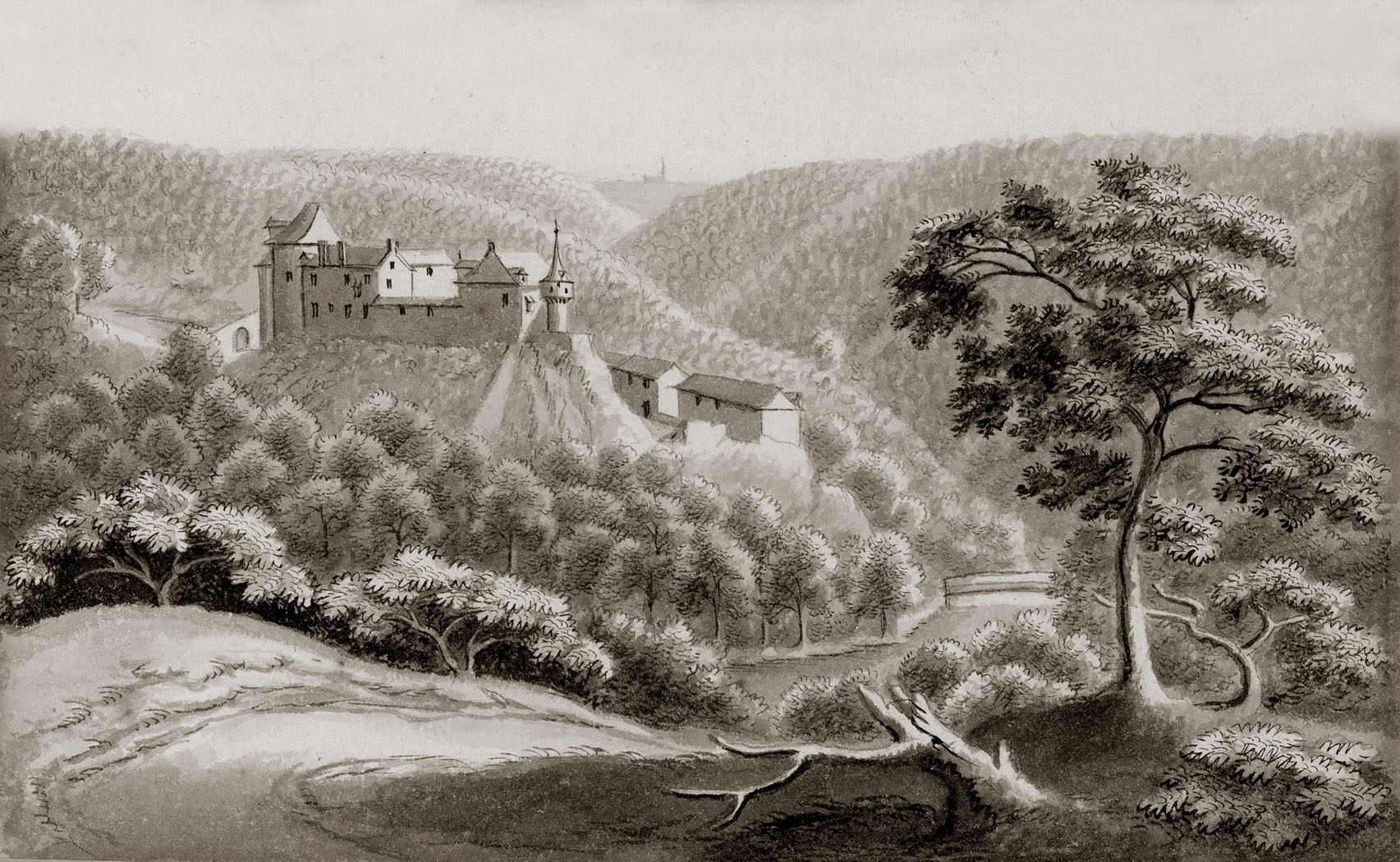
View from the south (Mathieu-Antoine Xhrouet, 1738)

== See also ==
- List of castles in Belgium
- List of protected heritage sites in Waimes

== Sources ==
- Reinhardstein Castle official website
