= Faymonville =

Section of Waimes, Wallonia, Belgium

Coordinates: 50.40469°N 6.13917°E

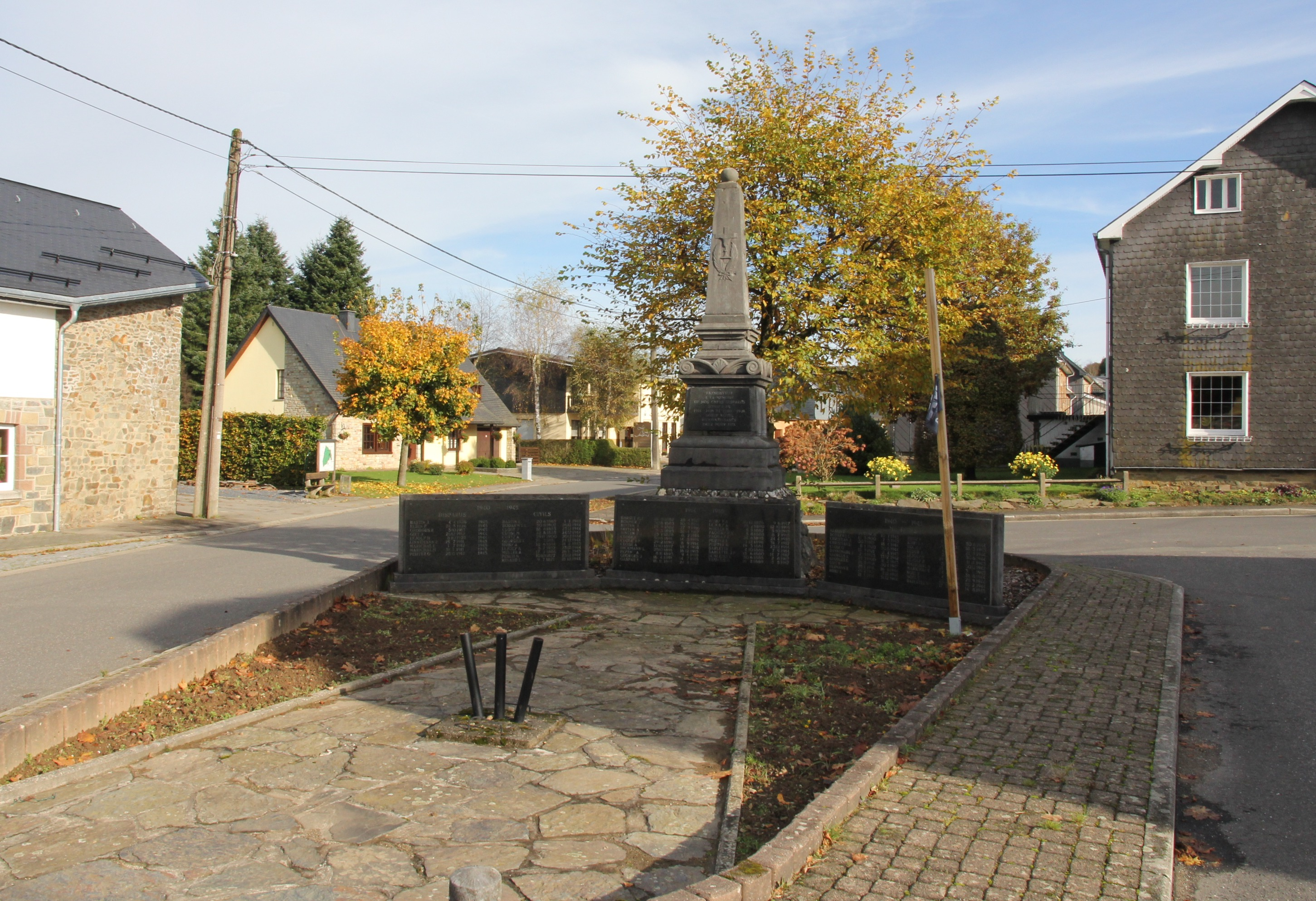
Memorial to the fallen and killed citizens of Faymonville between 1940 and 1945

Faymonville (French pronunciation: [fɛmɔ̃vil]; Walloon: Faimonveye, German: Außenborn) is a village of Wallonia and a district of the municipality of Waimes, located in the province of Liège, Belgium.

== Nickname ==
Its inhabitants are nicknamed the "Turks" by the neighbouring towns and villages.

It is believed that the inhabitants refused to join the crusades against the Ottoman Empire in the 16th century, and were referred to as Turks consequently. Another (more likely) reason could be that the inhabitants did not have to pay the taxes collected by the monks of the Principality of Stavelot-Malmedy for the war against the Turkish empire, since Faymonville was part of the Duchy of Luxembourg, contrary to the other Walloon villages of the area. The inhabitants of these villages therefore would have called the inhabitants of Faymonville the "Turks". To protest, the latter adopted crescent and star as their symbols wearing them and dressing their building. This later became a tradition. It was even once told that when the villagers were to gather in the church, they did not use the bells but a call to church like the call to prayer in Turkey. This has however never been really assessed and should be viewed more as a legend. Another, possibly residual reason in the historical or legendary background could be that Charles Martel, Frankish leader at the Battle of Amblève, perfected the use of feigned retreat tactics identified as having been originated by Mongols. Every year the town celebrates their connection to Turks and the inhabitants now call themselves Turks.

== Post World War One history ==
The town was part of the Eupen-Malmedy area transferred from Germany to Belgium in 1919. It was annexed to Germany occupation 1940–1945. During the battle of the Bulge, the town was heavily shelled. More than 50% of the buildings were completely destroyed, and most of the remaining ones severely damaged.

Today Faymonville forms part of the predominantly francophone Belgian district of Malmedy.

== Linguistic connections ==
'Faymonville' also occurs as a family surname present in neighbouring areas of Germany and Luxembourg.

== Notable residents ==
- Joseph Bastin (1870-1939) was a clergyman born in Faymonville, who was noted for his interest in the Walloon language and — prior to the end of World War One — for his support for the attachment of the Malmedy area (then legally part of Germany) to neighbouring Belgium.
