= Warche =

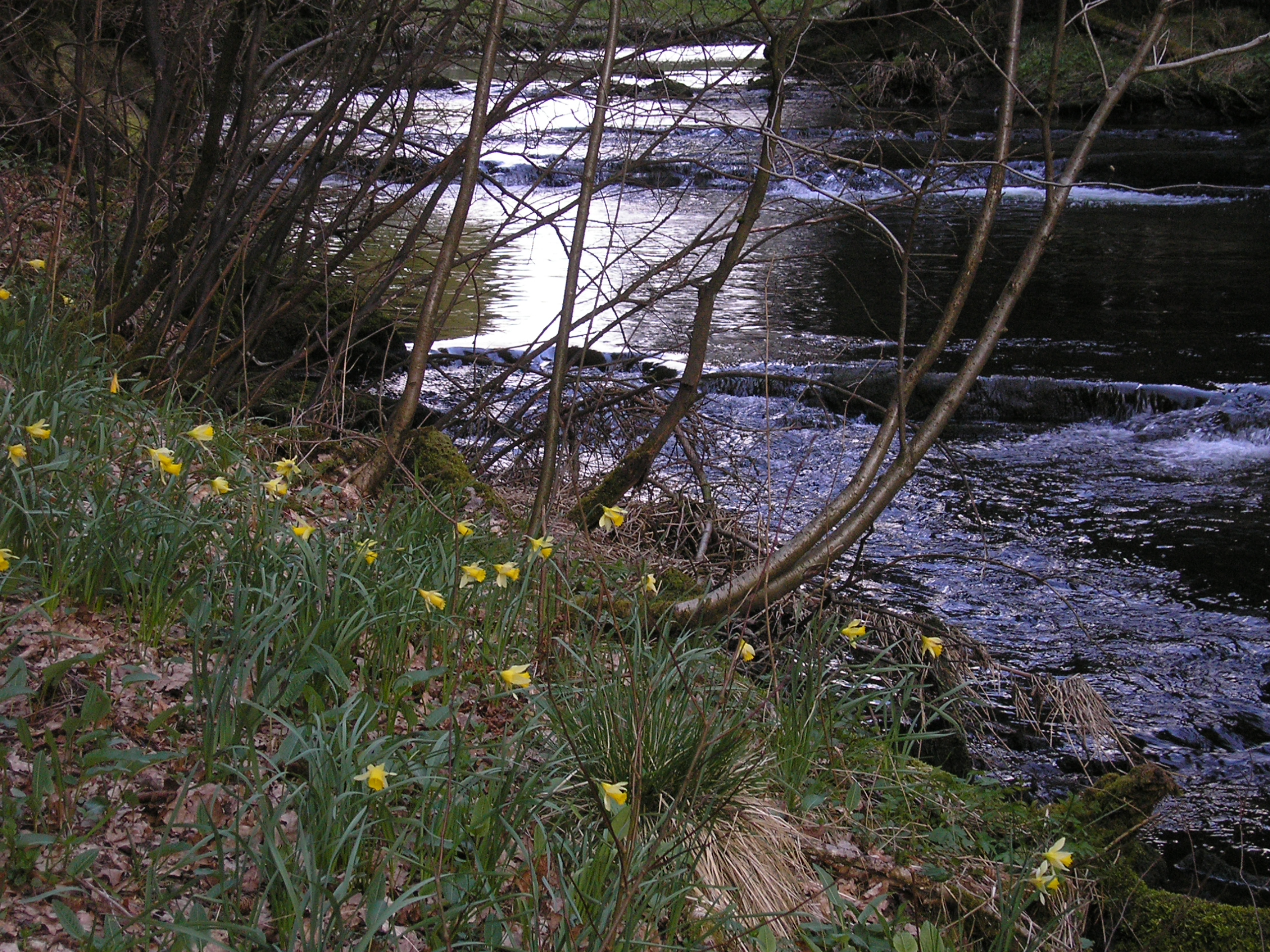
- Spring in the Warche valley

Location
- Location: East Belgium

Physical characteristics
- Source
  - location: Near Hünnigen in the municipality of Büllingen
  - elevation: ca. 660 m
- Mouth
  - location: Near Malmedy into the Amel
  - coordinates: 50°23′05″N 5°59′28″E
- Length: 40.9 km
- Basin size: 194 km²

Basin features
- Progression: Amblève→ Ourthe→ Meuse→ North Sea
- Landmarks: Small towns: Büllingen, Bütgenbach, Malmedy; Villages: Büllingen, Bütgenbach, Waimes, Malmedy
- Tributaries
  - left: Warchenne
  - right: Holzwarche, Bayehon, Trôs Maret
- Waterbodies: Reservoirs: Bütgenbach Reservoir, Robertville Reservoir

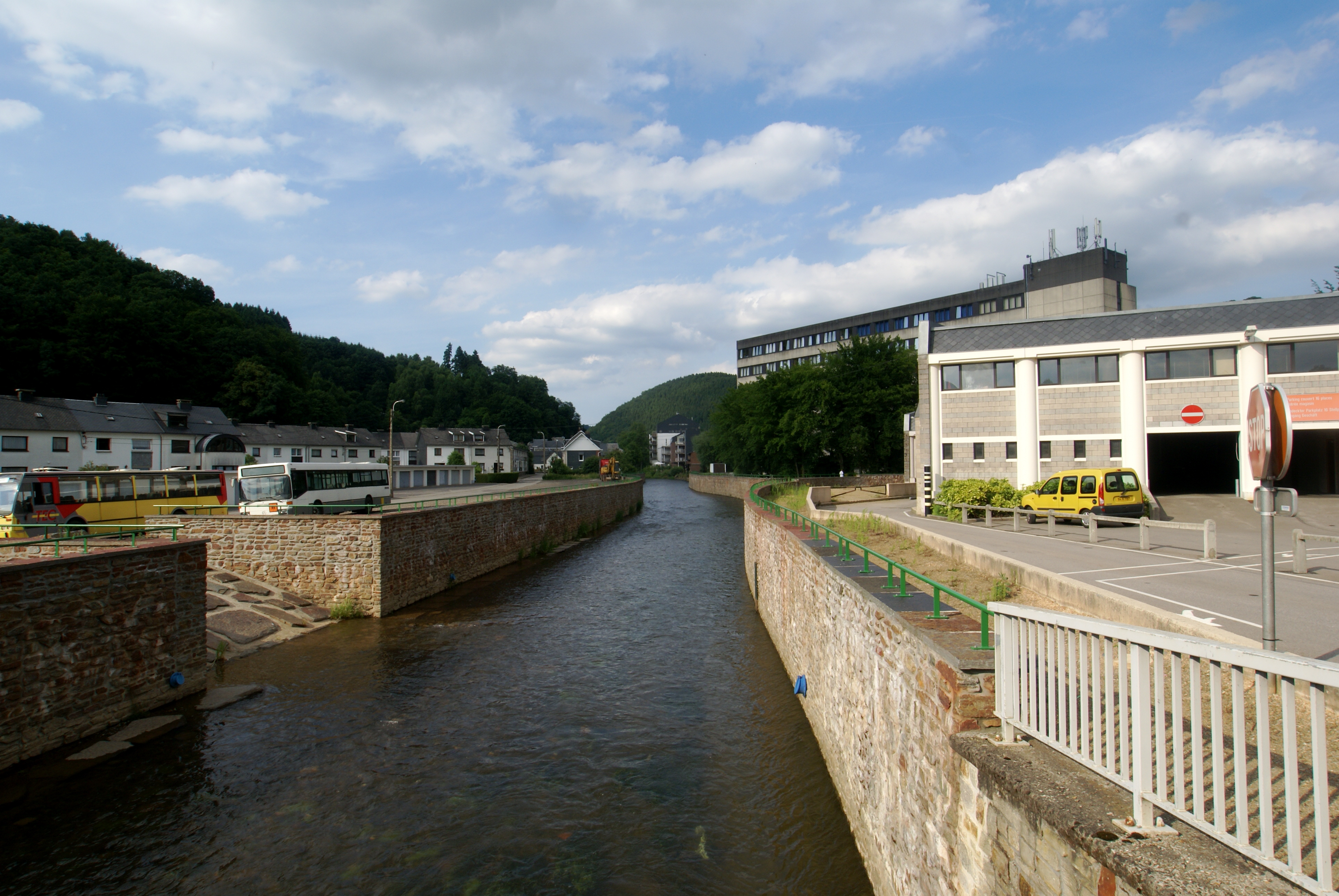
The Warche in Malmedy

The Warche is a river in eastern Belgium (province of Liège).

From its source at Losheimergraben on the Belgian-German border, it flows roughly west about 50 kilometres (31 mi), across the south of the Hautes Fagnes region.

It passes through the town of Malmedy, and the artificial lakes of Robertville and of Bütgenbach are formed by dams on the Warche.

It is a right tributary of the river Amblève, which it joins east of Stavelot.

In the past the Warche used to flow northward from Bévercé, following the current Trô Maret valley, to continue through the current Eau Rouge valley. This last valley is much larger than can be expected from such a small flow, still representing the original Warche valley. In that time the Warche confluenced with the Amblève at Stavelot. Later on, probably during the last ice age the Warche adopted its current position, flowing through the Malmedy graben.
