= Lake Ry de Rome =

Lake in Belgium

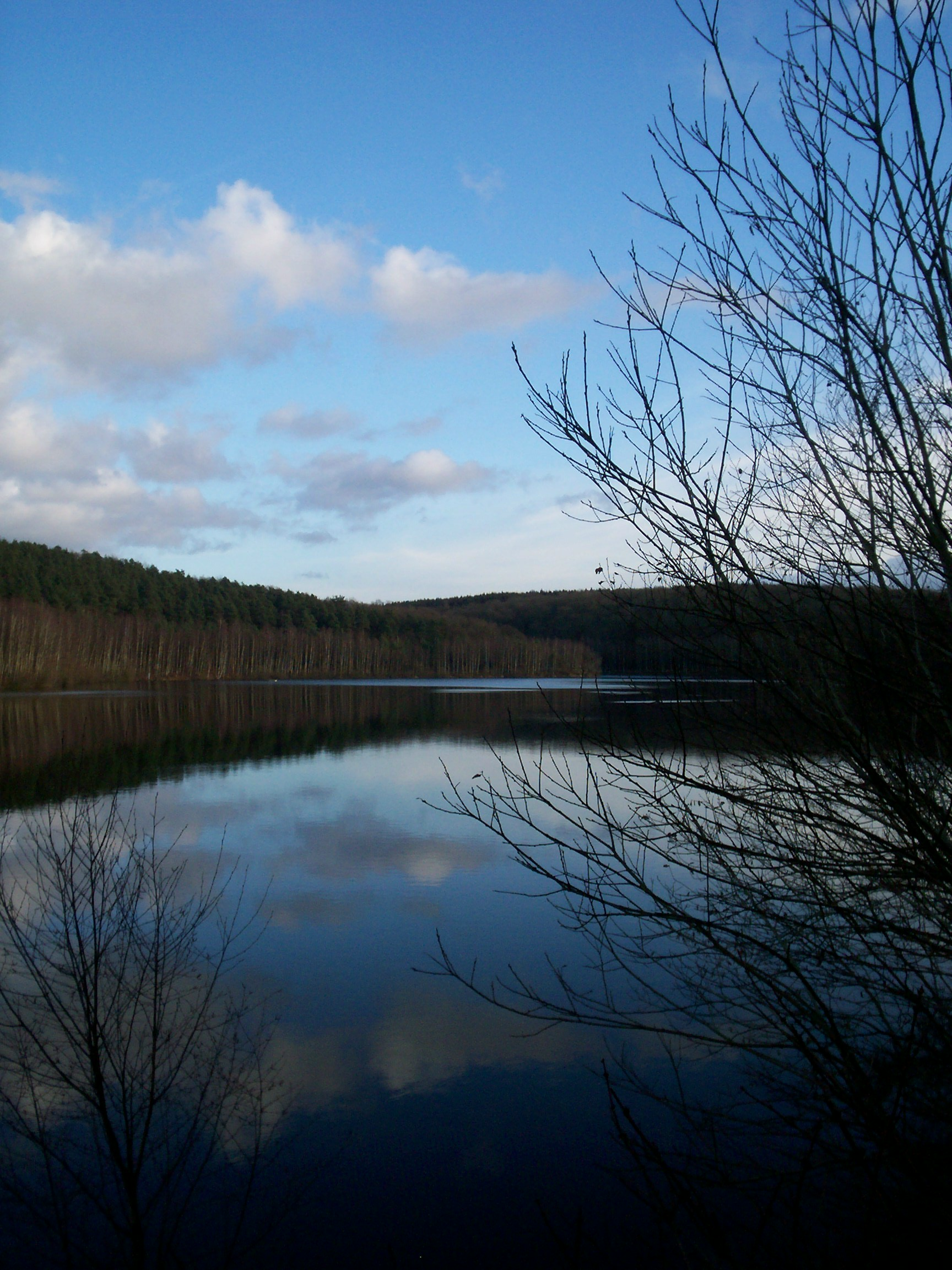

- Location within Belgium
- Coordinates: 50°01′20″N 04°32′16″E
- Type: Freshwater artificial lake
- Basin countries: Wallonia, Belgium
- Max. length: 1.5 km (0.93 mi)
- Max. width: 0.3 km (0.19 mi)
- Surface area: 0.25 km^{2} (0.097 sq mi)
- Water volume: 2.2×10^{6} m^{3} (1,800 acre⋅ft)
- Surface elevation: 743 m (2,438 ft)
- Islands: 0
- Settlements: Couvin

Lake Ry de Rome is an artificial lake near the city of Couvin, Wallonia, in Belgium near the border of France. The lake is located in the Ardennes. The water volume is 2,200,000 m^{3} and the area is 0.25 km^{2}.
