= Desteldonk =

Sub-municipality of the city of Ghent, Belgium

- Sub-municipality of Ghent
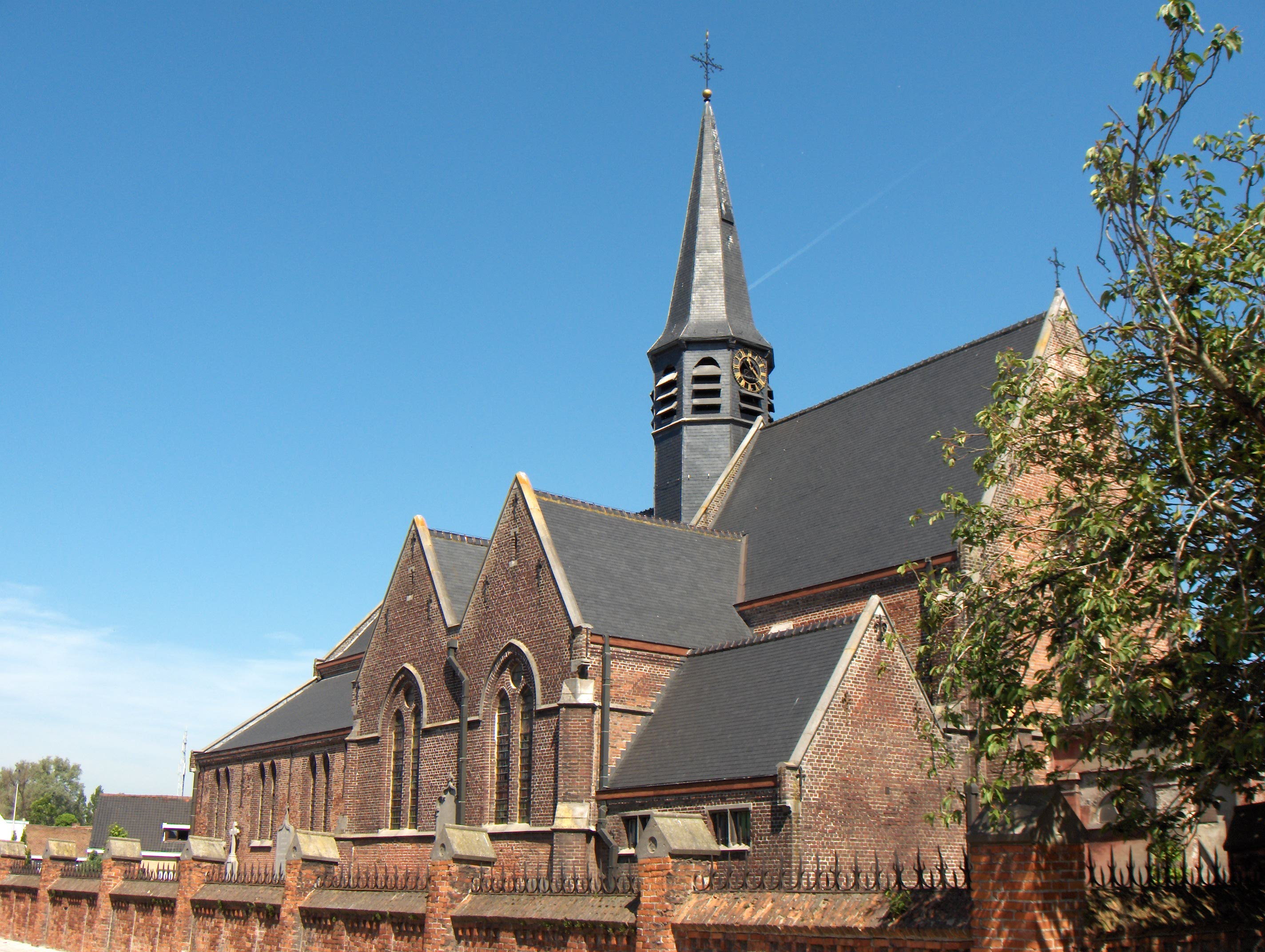
- Church of Our Lady from the 14th century
- Interactive map of Desteldonk
- Location within Belgium Location within East Flanders
- Coordinates: 51°7′19″N 3°46′52″E
- Country: Belgium
- Community: Flemish Community
- Region: Flemish Region
- Province: East Flanders
- Arrondissement: Ghent
- Municipality: Ghent

Area
  - Total: 5.71 km^{2} (2.20 sq mi)

Population (2021)
  - Total: 921
  - Density: 161/km^{2} (418/sq mi)
- Postal codes: 9042
- Area codes: 09

Desteldonk (French pronunciation: [ˈdɛstəldɔŋk]) is a sub-municipality of the city of Ghent located in the province of East Flanders, Flemish Region, Belgium. It was a separate municipality until 1965. In 1927, part of the original municipality was already annexed to Ghent. On 1 January 1965, the municipality of Desteldonk was merged into Ghent.
