= Balendijk =

- Village
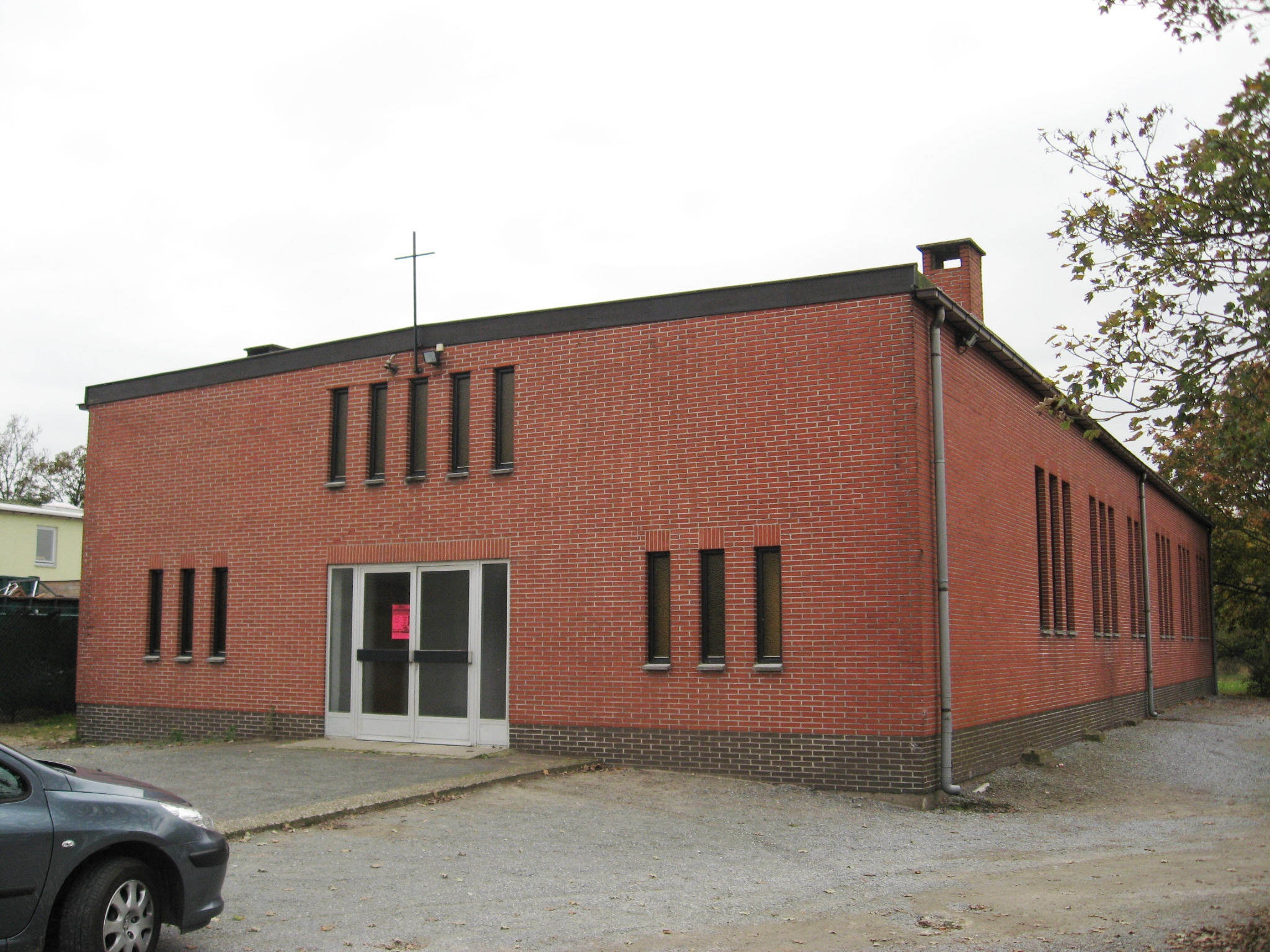
- The Onze-Lieve-Vrouw ter Kempen Church

- Location in Belgium
- Coordinates: 51.2199°N 5.2958°E
- Country: Belgium
- Region: Flemish Region
- Province: Limburg
- Arrondissement: Maaseik
- Municipality: Lommel

Area
  - Total: 9.46 km^{2} (3.65 sq mi)

Population (2021)
  - Total: 6,883
  - Density: 728/km^{2} (1,880/sq mi)
- Time zone: CET

Balendijk is a village of Lommel, a city, in the Belgian province of Limburg. It is near a road to Wezel. One can find an industrial landscape that extends to a former heath level that already had a significant industrial history. For example, the labor colony in Lommel-Glasfabriek, which was evacuated in 2008 in connection with remediation measures. These were again the result of the Vieille Montagne zinc factory, located in the neighboring Wezel.

== History ==
In the early 1960s, a Philips-based establishment was established. It involved a large company that included a glass factory where the glass was manufactured for lighting purposes. The chimneys date back to 1966 and 1971. Although it was an impressive company, its growth has stagnated somewhat, and in some instances, it also fired. Later it was named EMGO, a joint venture of Philips and its Osram competitor, each participating for 50%. In 2004 there were 514 people, of who 210 would disappear. In 2006, only 400 people were employed. In 2012 it was announced that EMGO will discontinue its activities in Lommel Balendijk. Some of the buildings of EMGO have been converted into the new company DUCATT, this company made high-transparency glass for solar panels and went bankrupt in 2017.

In 2023 it was announced that a glass factory would be built, creating 300 new jobs.

In Balendijk is also the Provincial Institute (Provil), a high school for general, technical and vocational education.

== Notes ==
1. Wikipedia NL – Balendijk
