= Ovifat =

Coordinates: 50.46646°N 6.107°E

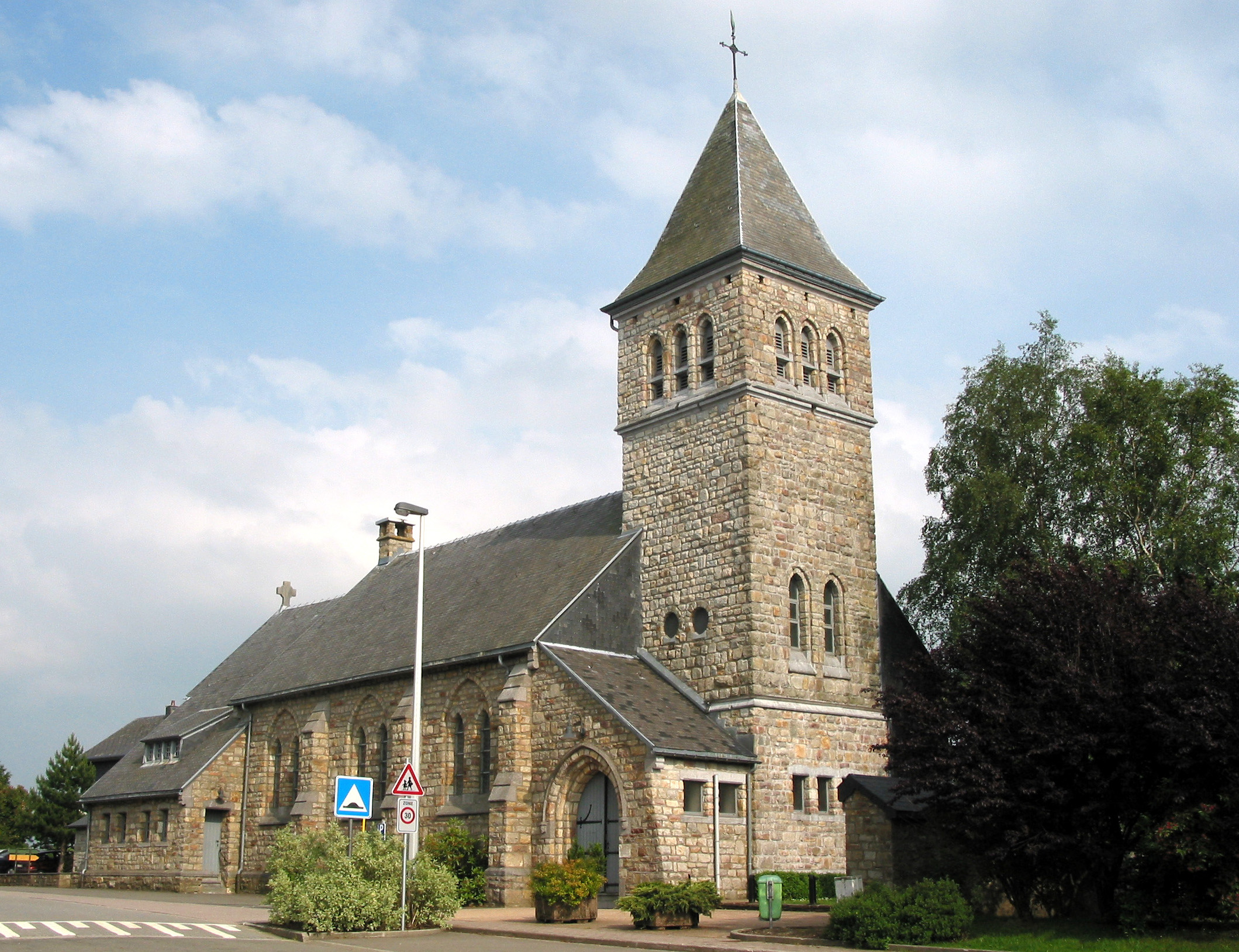

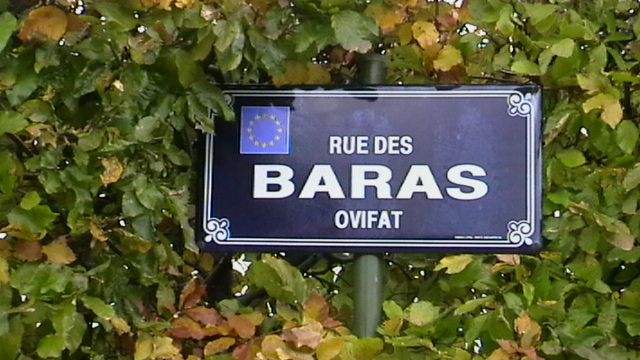
The nickname of the inhabitants has become a street name.

Ovifat (Walloon: Ôvîfa pronounced [õ.viː.'fa]) is a village of Wallonia in the municipality of Waimes, district of Robertville, located in the province of Liège, Belgium.

It is one of the highest villages in Belgium.

The population is about 500. Its inhabitants are nicknamed Baras (rams).
