= Lake Warfaaz =

Lake in Belgium

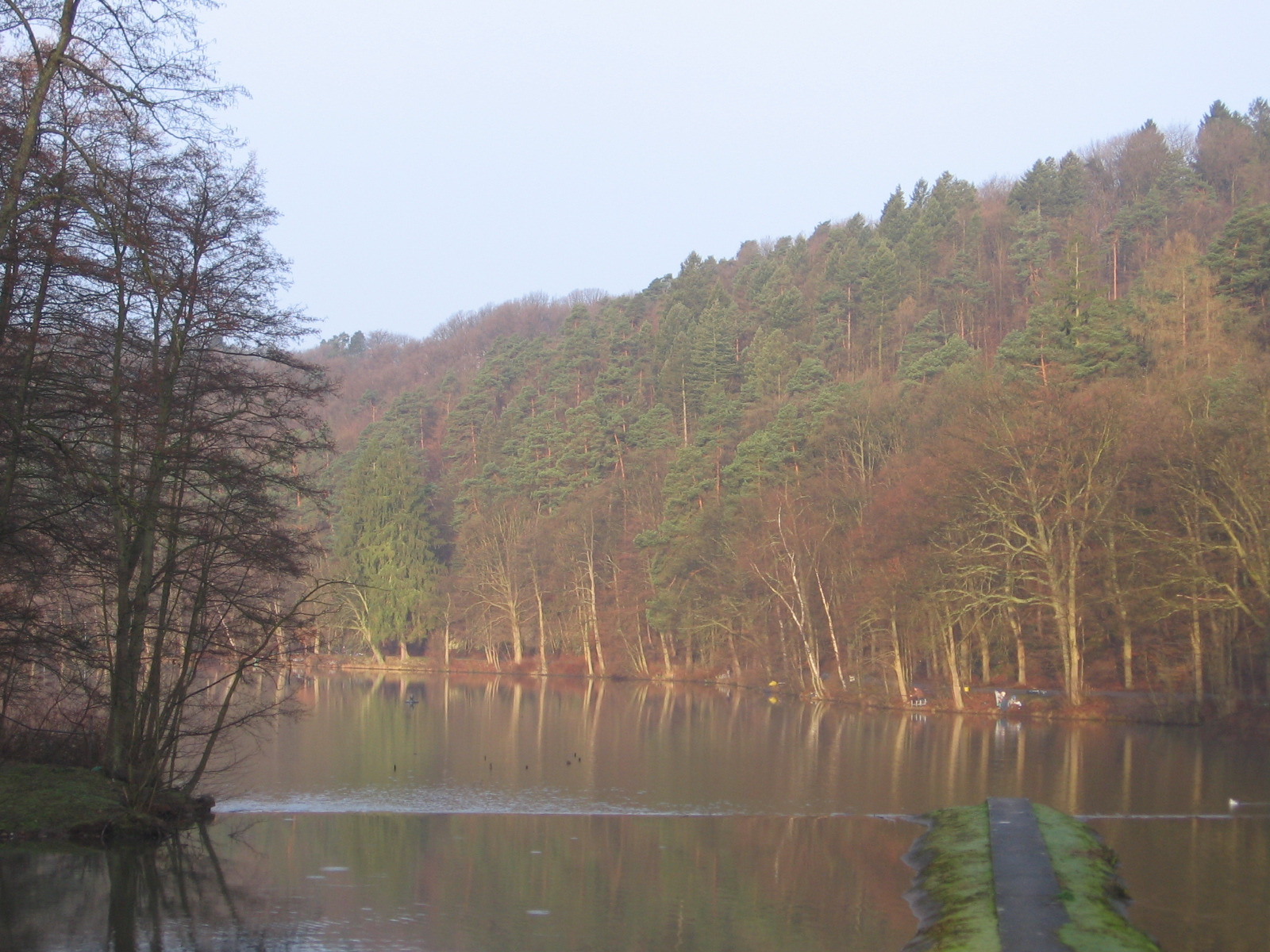

- Location within Belgium
- Coordinates: 50°30′10″N 05°53′22″E
- Type: Freshwater artificial lake
- Basin countries: Wallonia, Belgium
- Max. length: 0.6 km (0.37 mi)
- Max. width: 0.2 km (0.12 mi)
- Surface area: 0.08 km^{2} (0.031 sq mi)
- Water volume: 360,000 m^{3} (290 acre⋅ft)
- Surface elevation: 295 m (968 ft)
- Islands: 0
- Settlements: Spa

The lake Warfaaz is an artificial lake located in Wallonia near the thermal city of Spa in Ardennes in Belgium. The dam was built in 1892 on the Wayai river. The water volume is 360,000 m³ and the area is 0,08 km². It is a tourist attraction, with water sports, including pedalo and fishing.

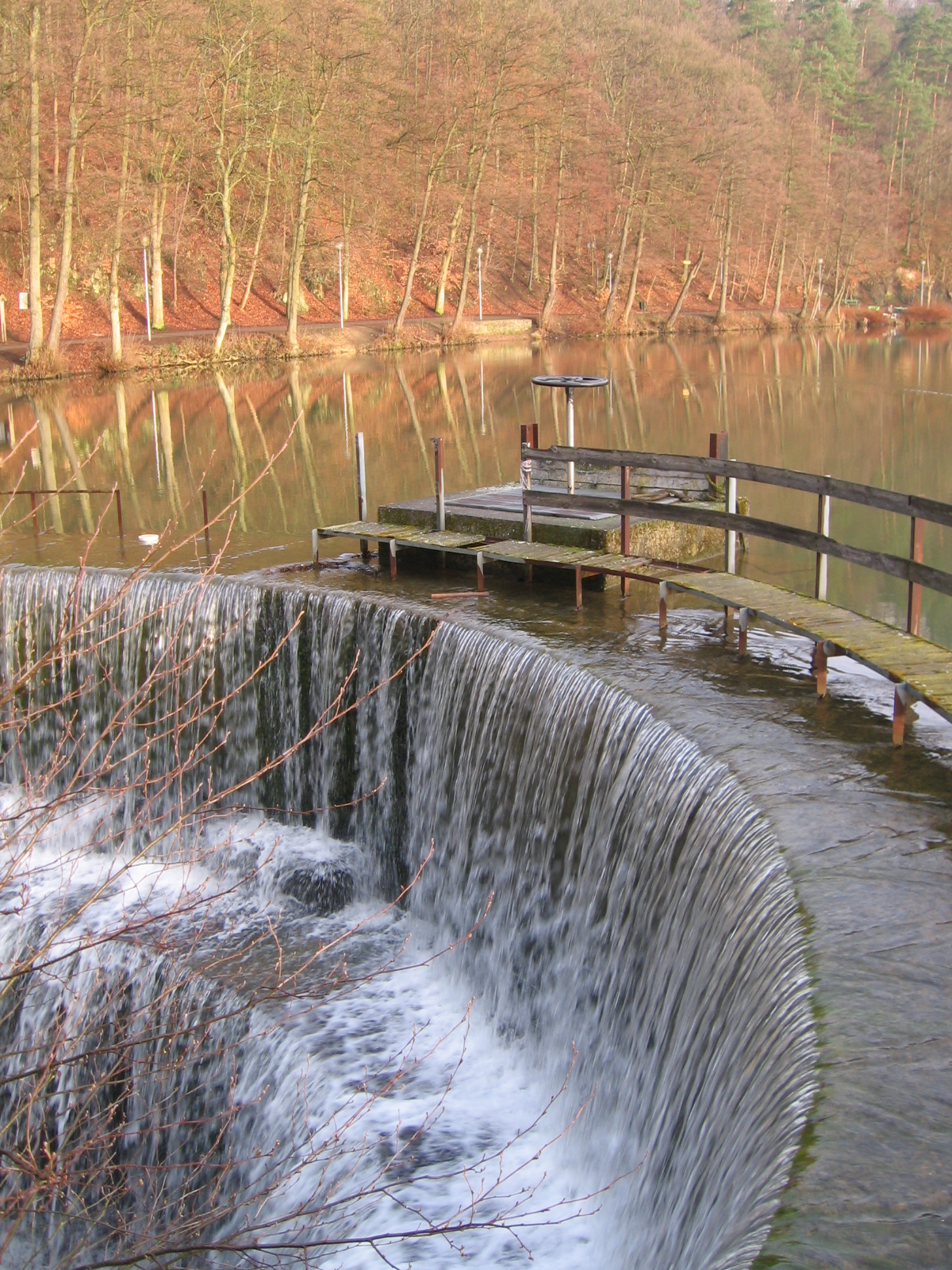
A waterfall

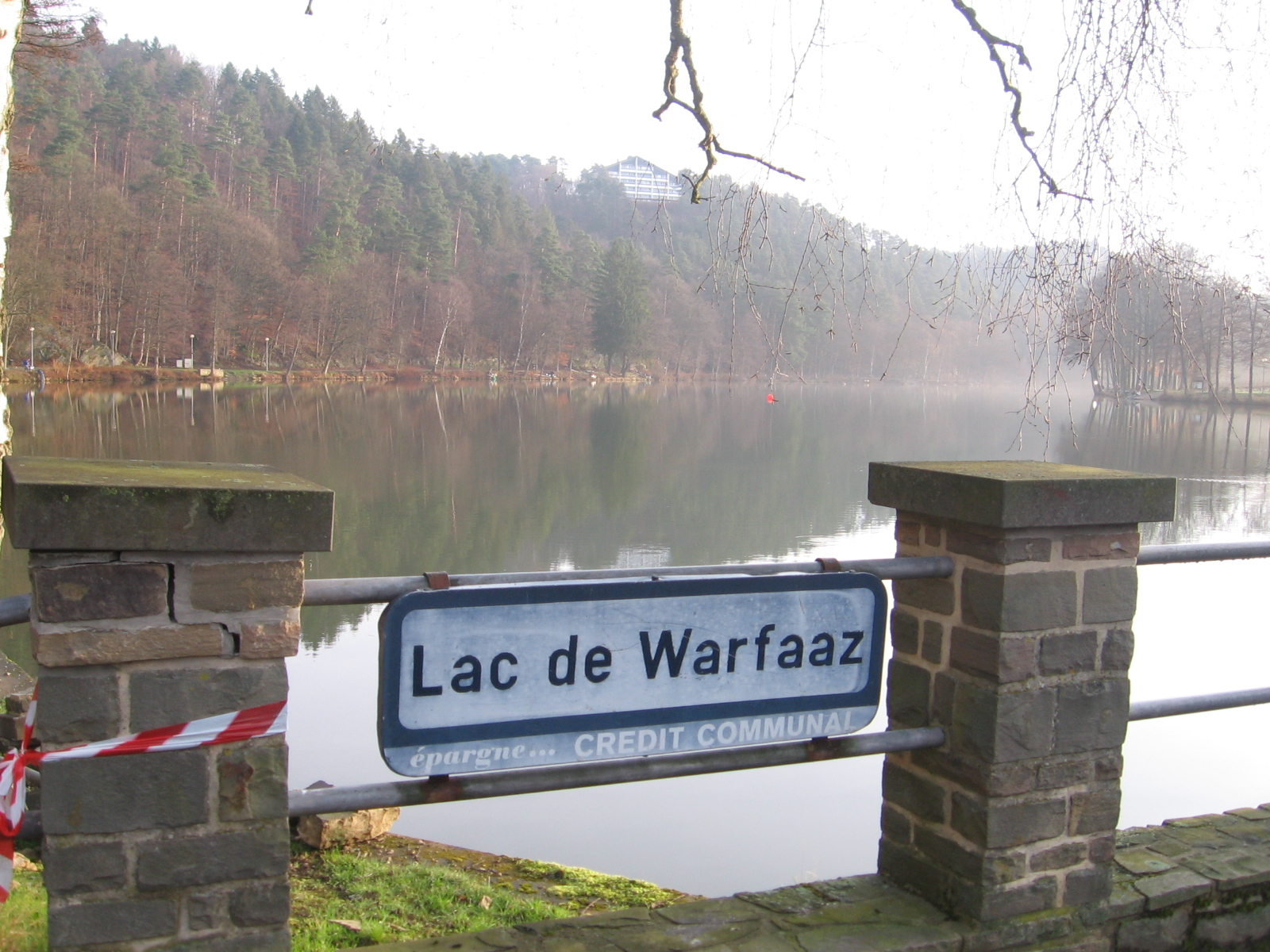
The lake
