= Nike Laakdal Wind Park =

Wind farm in Bergium

- Country: Belgium
- Coordinates: 51°05′57″N 5°05′25″E

Power generation
- Units operational: 6 × 1.5 MW
- Make and model: Senvion REpower MD77 (6)
- Nameplate capacity: 9 MW

The Nike Windpark Laakdal is a wind park containing 6 RePower MD77 wind turbines with a capacity of 1.5 MW each. It is located on the site of the Nike corporation in Laakdal, Belgium. The wind turbines have a rotor diameter of 77 meters and are installed on a 111.5 meter high steel framework. Roads capable of carrying heavy trucks run between the legs of some of these steel towers.

Wind turbine locations
