= Lake Robertville =

Lake in Belgium

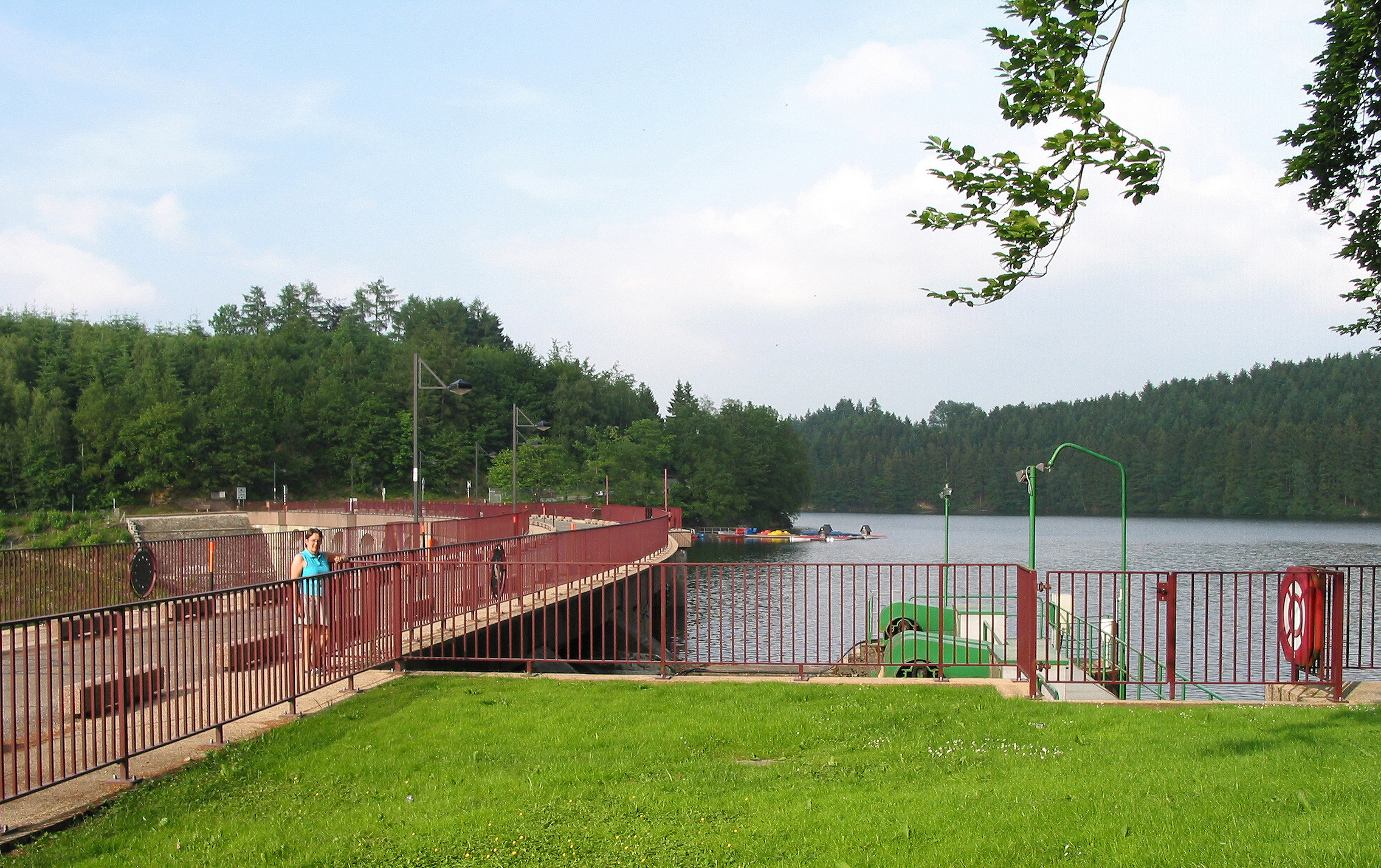

- Location within Belgium
- Coordinates: 50°27′00″N 06°06′49″E
- Type: Freshwater artificial lake
- Basin countries: Wallonia, Belgium
- Max. length: 3 km (1.9 mi)
- Max. width: 0.3 km (0.19 mi)
- Surface area: 0.62 km^{2} (0.24 sq mi)
- Max. depth: 54.5 m (179 ft)
- Water volume: 8,000,000 m^{3} (6,500 acre⋅ft)
- Surface elevation: 495 m (1,624 ft)
- Islands: 0
- Settlements: Malmedy

Lake Robertville is an artificial lake located in Wallonia near the city of Malmedy in Belgium. The water volume is 8,000,000 m³ and the area is 0,62 km². The lake is located in the High Fens park. The dam on the river Warche was built in 1928.

Lake Robertville is situated in the municipality of Waimes. It is named after the village of Robertville. The lake is an official swimming lake in Wallonia.

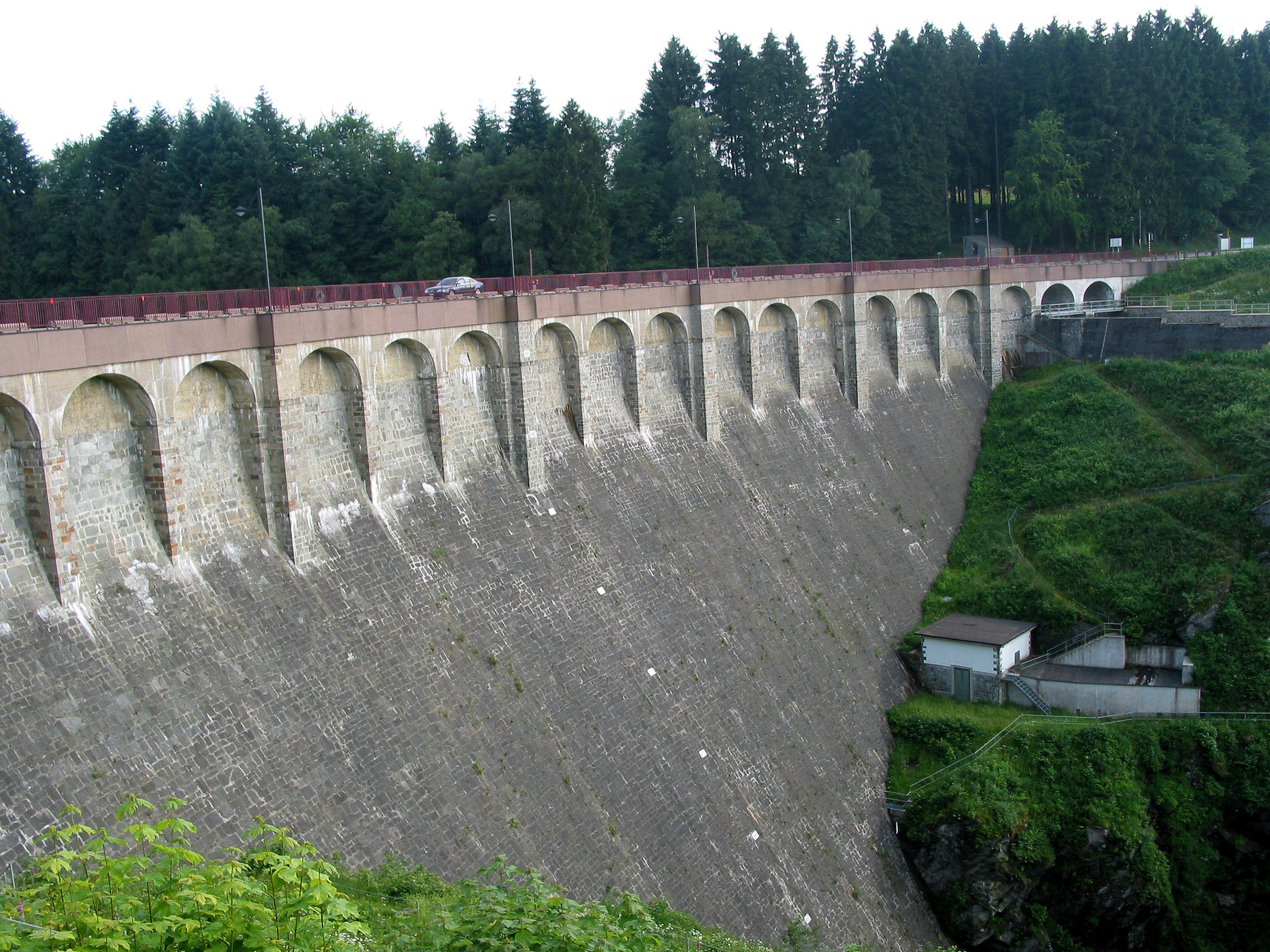
The dam
