= Lake Bütgenbach =

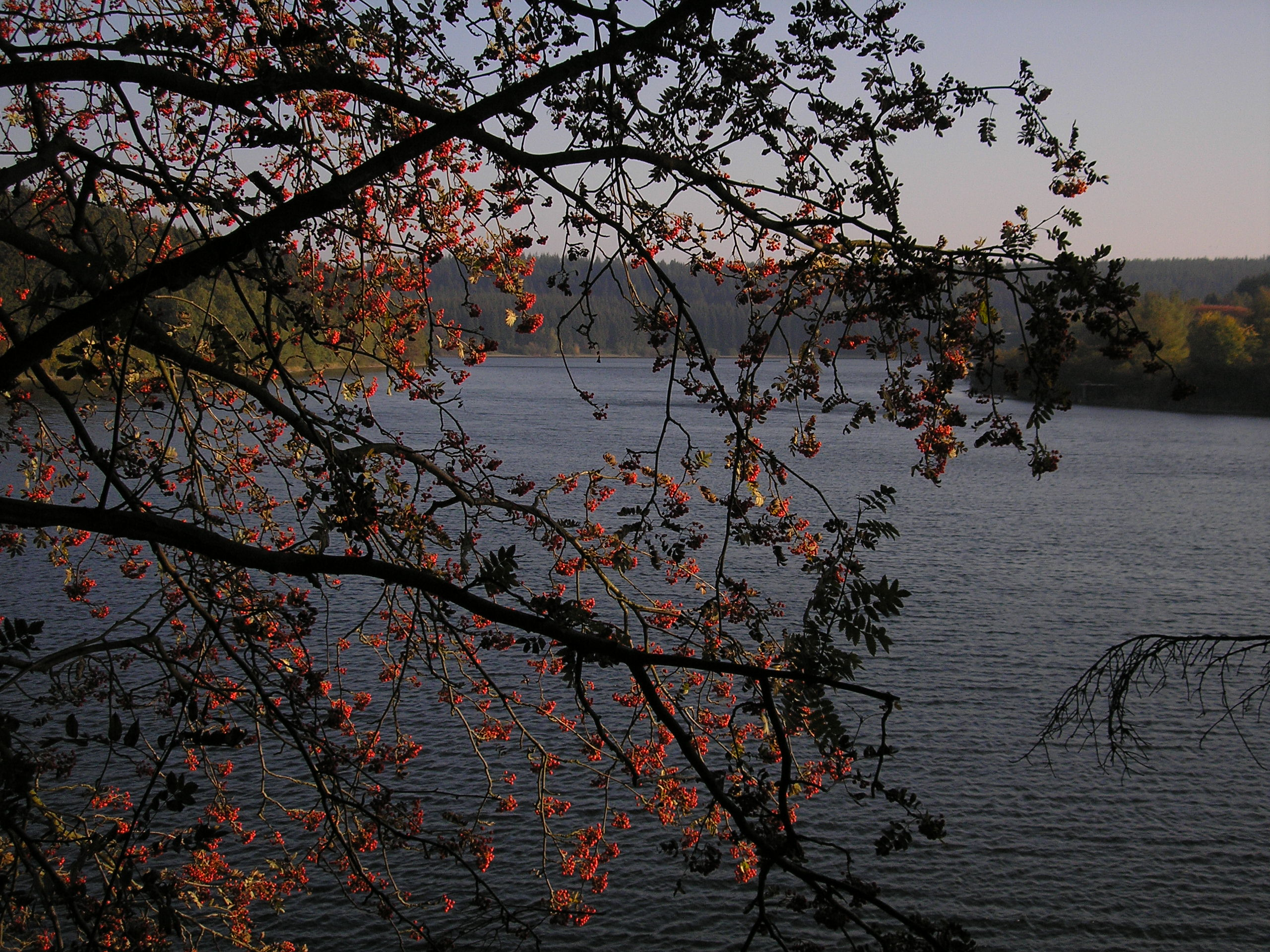
- Lake Bütgenbach

- Location within Belgium
- Location: (German-speaking Community of Belgium) East Belgium
- Coordinates: 50°25′39″N 06°13′40″E
- Type: Freshwater artificial lake
- Basin countries: Belgium
- Max. length: 3 km (1.9 mi)
- Max. width: 0.5 km (0.31 mi)
- Surface area: 1.2 km^{2} (0.46 sq mi)
- Surface elevation: 550 m (1,800 ft)
- Islands: 0
- Settlements: Bütgenbach

Lake Bütgenbach (German: Bütgenbacher See; French: Lac de Butgenbach) is an artificial lake created by the damming of the Warche river in 1932. It is located in East Belgium near the village of Bütgenbach in Ardennes (High Fens), Belgium. The lake is not far from the border of Germany.

It is a popular tourist attraction, with water sports, including kayaking and windsurfing.
