= Waimes =

Municipality in Liège Province, Wallonia, Belgium

Waimes Waime (Walloon): Weismes (German)
- Municipality
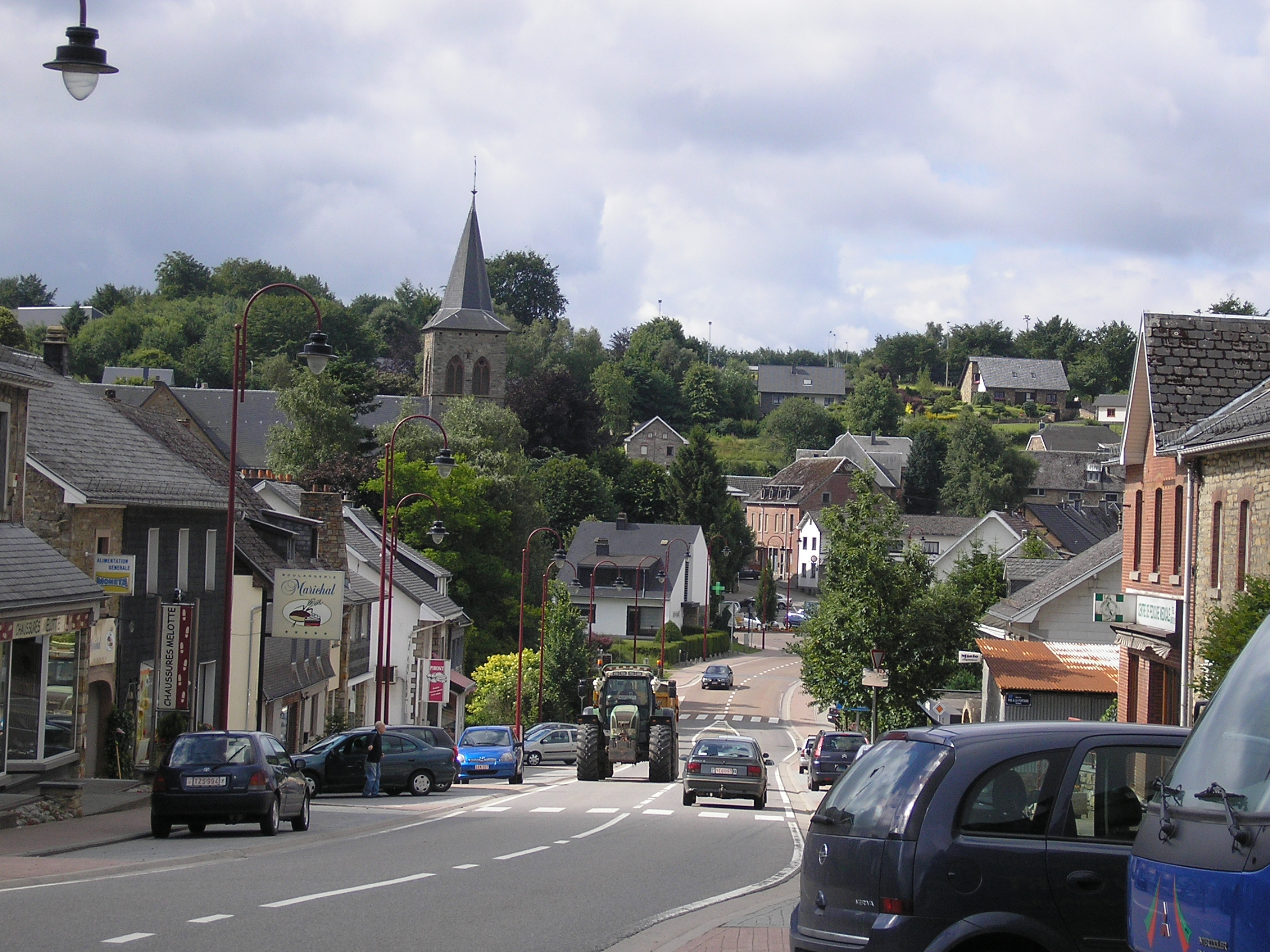

- Flag Coat of arms

- Location of Waimes in the province of Liège
- Interactive map of Waimes
- Location in Belgium
- Coordinates: 50°25′N 06°07′E
- Country: Belgium
- Community: French Community
- Region: Wallonia
- Province: Liège
- Arrondissement: Verviers

Government
  - Mayor: Daniel Stoffels (MR)
  - Governing parties: Waimes & Vous

Area
  - Total: 97.56 km^{2} (37.67 sq mi)

Population (2018-01-01)
  - Total: 7,429
  - Density: 76.15/km^{2} (197.2/sq mi)
- Postal codes: 4950
- NIS code: 63080
- Area codes: 080
- Website: www.waimes.be

Waimes (French: [wɛm]; German: Weismes [ˈvaɪsməs]; Walloon: Waime) is a municipality of Wallonia located in the province of Liège, Belgium.

On January 1, 2006, Waimes had a total population of 6,728. The total area is 96.93 km^{2} which gives a population density of 69 inhabitants per km^{2}.

Waimes is one of two mostly French-speaking municipalities in the East Cantons, the other being Malmedy. German as a minority language is also still widely spoken in Waimes to this day. The other surrounding municipalities in the area are part of the main German-speaking Community of Belgium.

The municipality consists of the following districts: Faymonville, Robertville (including the village of Ovifat), and Waimes.

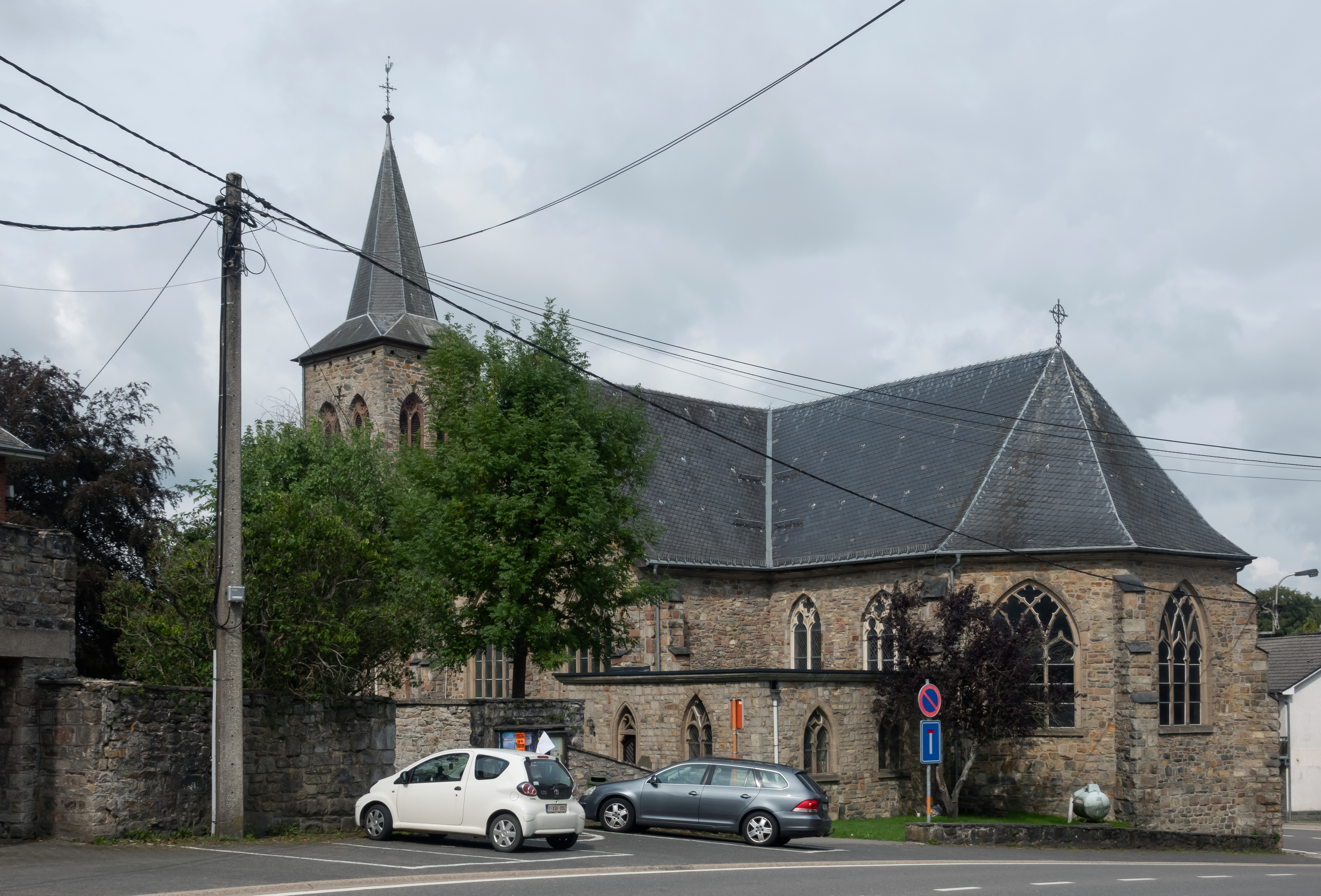
Waimes, church: l'église Saint-Saturnin

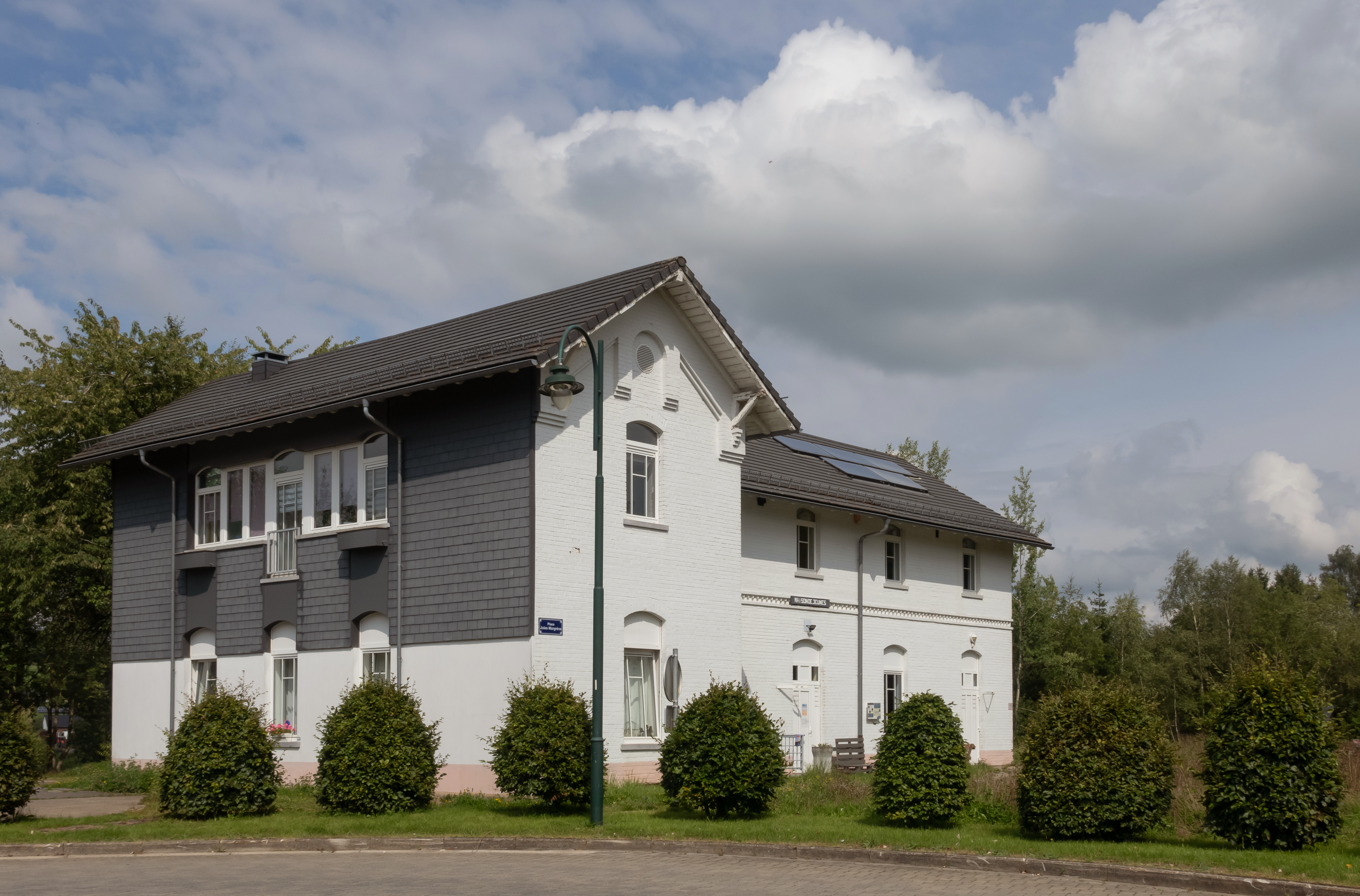
Waimes, former railway station

== See also ==
- List of protected heritage sites in Waimes
- Reinhardstein Castle
