= Bütgenbach =

Municipality in the German-speaking Community of Belgium

Bütgenbach: Butgenbach (French)
- Municipality
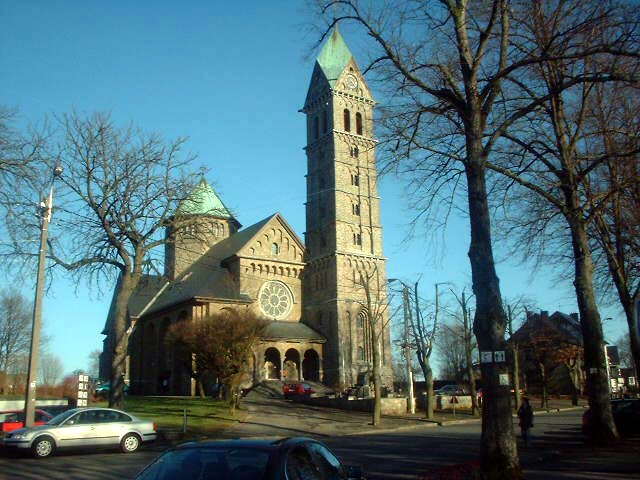

- Flag Coat of arms

- Location of Bütgenbach in the province of Liège
- Interactive map of Bütgenbach
- Location in Belgium
- Coordinates: 50°26′N 06°12′E
- Country: Belgium
- Community: German-speaking Community of Belgium
- Region: Wallonia
- Province: Liège
- Arrondissement: Verviers

Government
  - Mayor: Daniel Franzen (CSP)
  - Governing party: F.B.L. - Z.G.G.

Area
  - Total: 97.04 km^{2} (37.47 sq mi)

Population (2022-01-01)
  - Total: 5,607
  - Density: 57.78/km^{2} (149.7/sq mi)
- Postal codes: 4750
- NIS code: 63013
- Area codes: 080
- Website: www.butgenbach.be

Bütgenbach (German pronunciation: [ˈbʏtçənˌbax]; French: Butgenbach, pronounced [bytʃənbak]) is a municipality located in the Belgian province of Liège. On January 1, 2006, Bütgenbach had a total population of 5,574. The total area is 97.31 km^{2} which gives a population density of 57 inhabitants per km^{2}. As part of the German-speaking Community of Belgium, the official language in this municipality is German.

The municipality consists of the following sub-municipalities: Bütgenbach proper and Elsenborn. It lends its name to a nearby artificial lake.

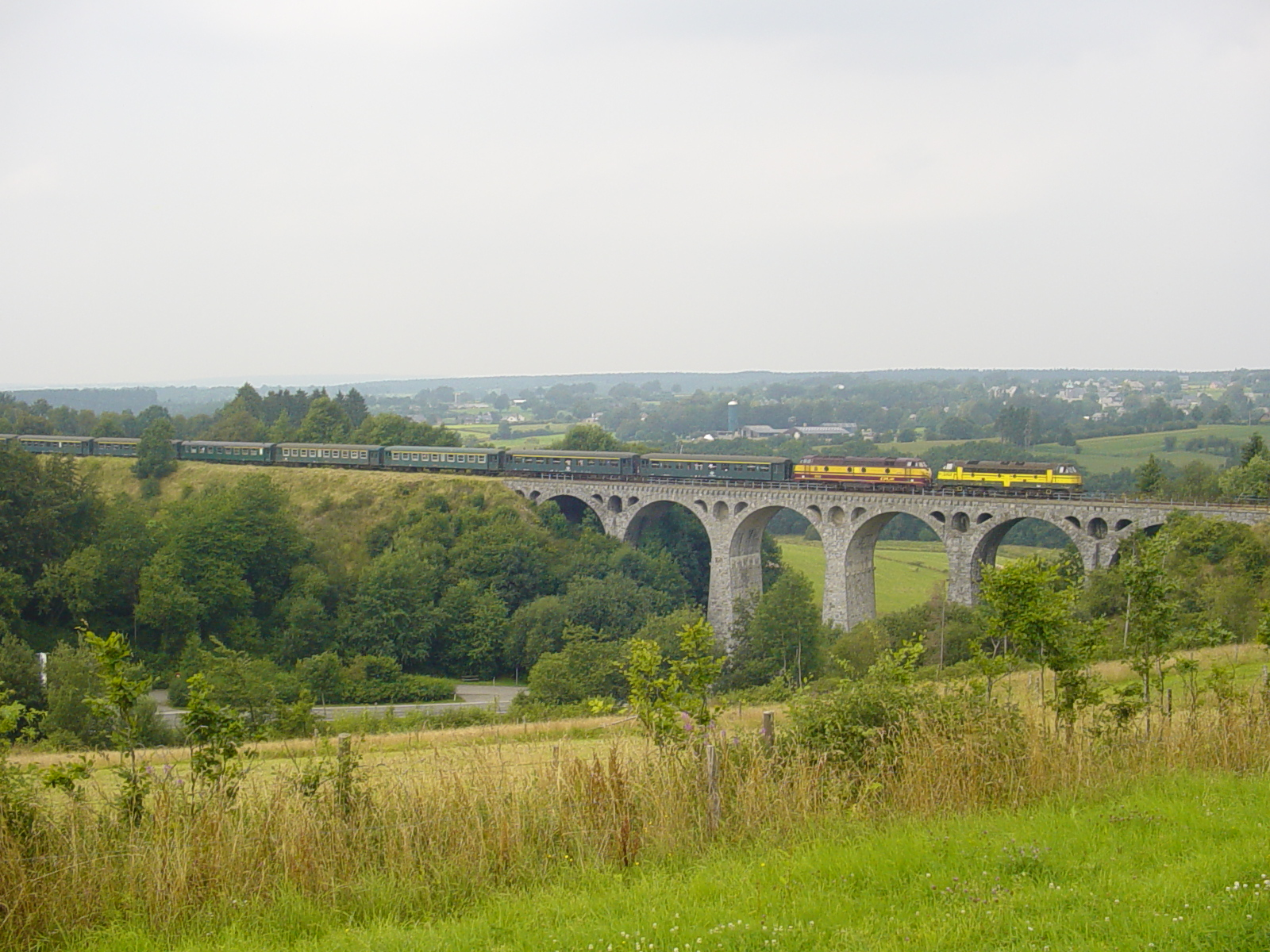
Bridge on the Vennbahn outside Bütgenbach

== See also ==
- List of protected heritage sites in Bütgenbach
