= Elections in Belgium =

Elections in Belgium are organised for legislative bodies only, and not for executive functions. Direct elections take place for the European Parliament, the Chamber of Representatives, the Parliaments of the Regions, the Parliaments of the Communities, the provincial councils, the municipal councils and the councils of Districts of Antwerp. Voting is mandatory in federal elections, and all elections use proportional representation which in general requires coalition governments.

The method of election, the elected bodies, and the political party system have changed drastically since the founding of Belgium in 1830. At first, there were only municipal, provincial and national elections with only few people being able to vote on the national level. Over time, voting rights were extended and eventually made compulsory. In the second half the 20th century, political parties split along linguistic lines and the number of parties increased. In 1979, the European Parliament became a directly elected supranational body and as a result of the federalisation of the country, the Communities and Regions of Belgium also got their own legislatures which have been directly elected since 1993.

== Latest election ==
Party	Votes	%	Seats
New Flemish Alliance	1,167,061	16.71	24
Vlaams Belang	961,601	13.77	20
Reformist Movement	716,934	10.26	20
Workers' Party of Belgium	688,369	9.86	15
Vooruit (political party)	566,436	8.11	13
Socialist Party (Belgium)	561,602	8.04	16
Christian Democratic and Flemish	557,392	7.98	11
Les Engagés	472,755	6.77	14
Open Flemish Liberals and Democrats	380,659	5.45	7
Groen (political party)	324,608	4.65	6
Ecolo	204,438	2.93	3
DéFI	84,024	1.20	1
Blanco Party	75,683	1.08	0
Chez Nous (Belgian political party)	64,058	0.92	0
Voor U	43,346	0.62	0
Citizen Collective	35,706	0.51	0
Team Fouad Ahidar	24,826	0.36	0
Belgische Unie – Union Belge	15,780	0.23	0
DierAnimal	10,341	0.15	0
Volt Belgium	7,245	0.10	0
Lutte Ouvrière (Belgium)	6,552	0.09	0
L'Unie	5,640	0.08	0
Reprise en Main Citoyenne	4,025	0.06	0
Agora (Belgium)	3,473	0.05	0
Gezond Verstand	2,352	0.03	0
Total	6,984,906	100.00	150

== Organisation of elections ==
The Federal Government is responsible for organising all non-local elections, being the elections for the community and regional parliaments, the federal parliament and the European Parliament in Belgium. The Elections Directorate of the Federal Public Service Interior is tasked with this.

Since 2001, the Regional Governments (Flanders, Brussels and Wallonia) are responsible for organising all local elections, being the elections for the municipal councils, provincial councils, district councils and OCMW/CPAS councils. In Flanders, the Local Government Agency (Agentschap Binnenlands Bestuur) is tasked with this, while objections go to the Council for Election Disputes (Raad voor Verkiezingsbetwistingen).

== Election method ==
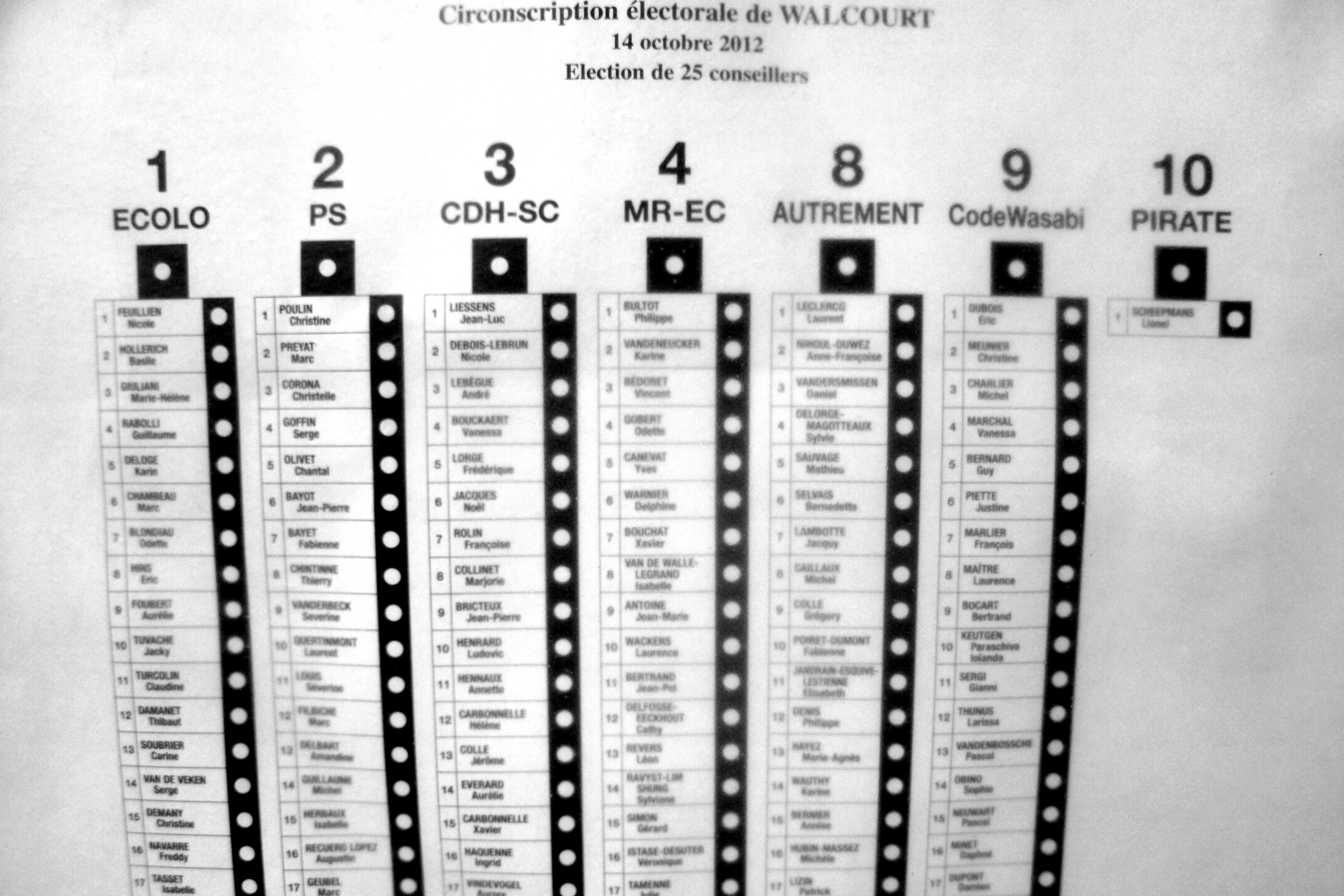
Ballot for communal election in 2012 in Walcourt.

Belgium has a multi-party system, with numerous political parties in which no one party often has a chance of gaining power alone, and parties must work with each other to form coalition governments.

Several months before an election, each party forms a list of candidates for each district. Parties are allowed to place as many candidates on their "ticket" as there are seats available. The formation of the list is an internal process that varies with each party. The place on the list influences the election of a candidate, but its influence has diminished since the last electoral reform.

Political campaigns in Belgium are relatively short, lasting only about one month, and there are restrictions on the use of billboards. For all of their activities, campaigns included, the political parties have to rely on government subsidies and dues paid by their members.

Since no single party holds an absolute majority, after the election the strongest party or party family will usually create a coalition with some of the other parties to form the government.

Voting is compulsory in Belgium, with more than 90% of the population participating. In 2021, voting for the local elections (municipal and province) was made voluntary from the 2024 elections.

Belgian voters are given five options when voting. They may—

- Vote for a list as a whole, thereby showing approval of the order established by the party they vote for
- Vote for one or more individual candidates belonging to one party, regardless of his or her ranking on the list. This is a "preference vote"
- Vote for one or more of the "alternates (substitutes)"
- Vote for one or more candidates, and one or more alternates, all of the same party
- Vote invalid or blank so no one receives the vote

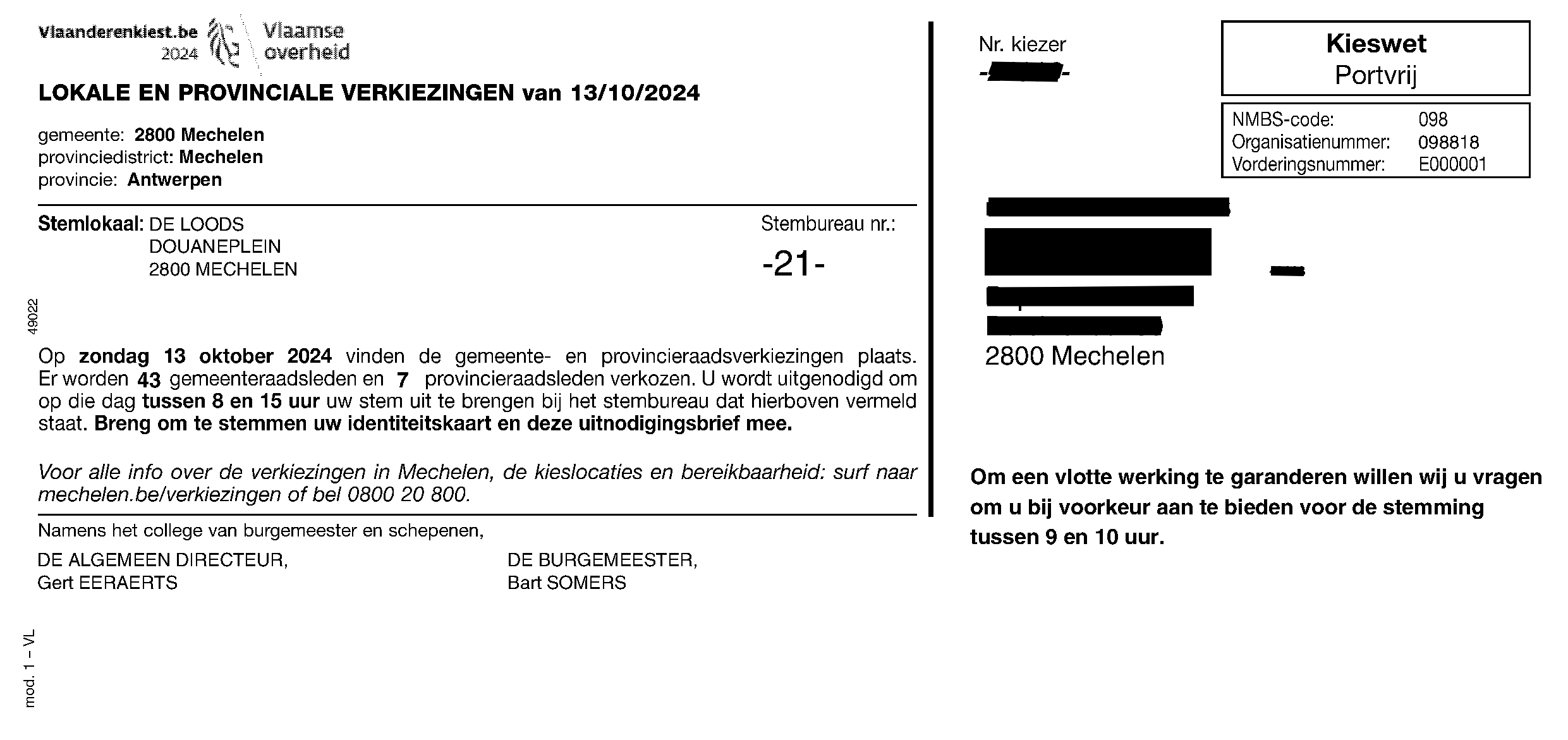
A voter invitation card for the 2024 Belgian local elections in the city of Mechelen

Voting in Belgium is done by paper voting or electronic voting on a computer depending on the place of voting. A few weeks before the actual election, every Belgian older than 18 receives a voter invitation card with the details of where and when to vote. The voting cards are sent by the municipal administration to all of the municipality's inhabitants based on the national population register. Voting bureaus are usually in schools. On polling day, always a Sunday, a volunteer at the voting bureau checks the voter in. After taking the voter's electronic identity card and voting card, the volunteer issues a magnetic card to operate the voting machine. After the voter has finished, the volunteer verifies that the magnetic card was used to cast a valid vote, then returns the voter's ID and voting card, now stamped as proof of having voted.

== Voters ==
Voters are Belgian citizens over the age of 18 and residing in Belgium. They are automatically registered on the electoral rolls on reaching the age of 18 and are subject to compulsory voting.

EU citizens aged 18 or older may register to vote in Belgium for European and municipal elections, a right established by European treaties. Non-EU citizens may register to vote in Belgium for municipal elections only, if living in Belgium for at least five years; this right was introduced in 2004 after extensive political debate. Belgian citizens living abroad may register to vote in a diplomatic or consular post in their country of residence, to vote for European and federal elections. For all of these groups, registration is not compulsory, but once registered, the person is theoretically subject to compulsory voting.

The law of 17 November 2016 extended the right to vote for European Parliament elections to Belgians living in a non-EU member state. On 26 August 2016, the cabinet also approved to extend the right to vote for Belgians living abroad in regional elections; however, this change is subject to approval by special majority in parliament, causing the measure to stall. Proposals to grant the right to vote from 16 years old for municipal elections were voted down, respectively in Flanders in 2017 and in Wallonia in 2018.

In 2021, voting for the municipal and provincial elections was made voluntary in the Flanders Region only, starting from the 2024 elections.

Elections for	Belgians in Belgium	Foreigners residing in Belgium		Belgians residing abroad	
Elections for	Belgians in Belgium	EU citizens	Non-EU citizens	In an EU country	In a non-EU country
Electorate	7,975,658 voters (as of 1 August 2018)	130,559 registered 17.5% of 748,267 eligible (as of 1 August 2018)	29,557 registered 15.2% of 194,593 eligible (as of 1 August 2018)	128,902 registered (as of 1 March 2014)	
European Parliament	Compulsory	May register to vote	Not allowed	May register to vote	May register to vote (by law of 17 November 2016)
Chamber of Representatives	Compulsory	Not allowed		May register to vote (by law of 18 December 1998)	
Community and Regional Parliaments	Compulsory	Not allowed			
Provincial councils	Voluntary	Not allowed			
Municipal councils	Voluntary	May register to vote (by law of 27 January 1999)	May register to vote if living in Belgium for at least five years (by law of 19 March 2004)	Not allowed	

== Levels of election ==
=== European elections ===
Belgian voters elect 21 members to the European Parliament. This number gradually decreased following the accession of new member states to the European Union, the latest being Croatia in 2013. Direct elections have taken place since 1979.

There are three constituencies, organised by linguistic community:

Constituency	1979 & 1984 & 1989	1994 & 1999	2004	2009	2014 & 2019	2024
Dutch-speaking electoral college	13 / 24	14 / 25	14 / 24	13 / 22	12 / 21	13 / 22
French-speaking electoral college	11 / 24	10 / 25	9 / 24	8 / 22	8 / 21	8 / 22
German-speaking electoral college		1 / 25	1 / 24	1 / 22	1 / 21	1 / 22

Since the abolishment of direct elections to the Senate in 2014, these elections are the only ones with community-wide lists, as elections to the Chamber of Representatives use provincial lists.

Inhabitants of the six municipalities with language facilities in the Brussels Periphery (Drogenbos, Kraainem, Linkebeek, Sint-Genesius-Rode, Wemmel and Wezembeek-Oppem) can opt to vote for French-speaking lists despite being in the Dutch language area, per article 168bis of the Belgian Constitution.

=== Federal elections ===
Belgium elects its bicameral federal legislature, the Federal Parliament (Federaal Parlement/Parlement fédéral/Föderales Parlament).

- The Chamber of Representatives (Kamer van Volksvertegenwoordigers/Chambre des Représentants/Abgeordnetenkammer) consists of 150 members, each elected for a five-year term by proportional representation. Prior to the 1993 state reform, it had 212 members.
- The Senate (Senaat/Sénat/Senat) has 60 members, of which 50 are appointed by the community and regional parliaments, and 10 are co-opted (i.e., appointed by the other senators). Before 2014 (due to the sixth Belgian state reform) the Senate had 71 members, of which 40 were directly elected.

Elections for the Federal Parliament are normally held every five years, coinciding with the European (and consequently also regional) elections. Early elections are possible, after which the legislature lasts until the next European election. Before the sixth Belgian state reform, the term was four years without any link to the other elections. The most recent federal elections were held in 2024 with the next expected in or before 2029.

There are eleven constituencies coinciding with the ten provinces and the Brussels-Capital Region. Previous to 2012, Brussels formed together with half of the province of Flemish Brabant the Brussels-Halle-Vilvoorde constituency.

Number of seats by constituency:

Constituency	2002–2012	2012–present
Antwerp	24 / 150	
East Flanders	20 / 150	
Hainaut	19 / 150	18 / 150
West Flanders	16 / 150	
Brussels-Capital Region		15 / 150
Brussels-Halle-Vilvoorde	22 / 150	
Flemish Brabant		15 / 150
Leuven	7 / 150	
Liege	15 / 150	
Limburg	12 / 150	
Namur	6 / 150	
Walloon Brabant	5 / 150	
Luxembourg	4 / 150	

=== Regional elections ===
Since the 1993 state reform, the Parliaments of the federated entities (Communities and Regions) are directly elected with elections always coinciding with European Parliament elections (thus with fixed terms of five years). Previously, these Parliaments consisted of the federal representatives elected in the respective region.

The Flemish Parliament, Walloon Parliament, the Brussels Regional Parliament and the Parliament of the German-speaking Community are directly elected. The Parliament of the French Community consists of all members of the Walloon Parliament as well as 19 members chosen by the French-speaking members of the Brussels Regional Parliament.

Flemish Parliament
Constituency	2004–present
Antwerp	33 / 124
East Flanders	27 / 124
West Flanders	22 / 124
Flemish Brabant	20 / 124
Limburg	16 / 124
Brussels Capital Region	6 / 124

Walloon Parliament
Constituency	2014–present
Liège	13 / 75
Charleroi	9 / 75
Nivelles	8 / 75
Namur	7 / 75
Tournai-Ath-Mouscron	7 / 75
Verviers	6 / 75
Mons	5 / 75
Soignies	4 / 75
(Walloon Parliament constituency)	4 / 75
Huy-Waremme	4 / 75
Thuin	3 / 75
Arlon-Marche-Bastogne	3 / 75
Neufchâteau-Virton	2 / 75

Brussels Regional Parliament
Constituency	1989-1999	2004–present
French-language list	75 / 75	72 / 89
Dutch-language list	75 / 75	17 / 89

Parliament of the French Community
Composition	1995–present
All members of the Walloon Parliament	75 / 94
Appointed from French language members of the Brussels Regional Parliament	19 / 94

=== Local elections ===
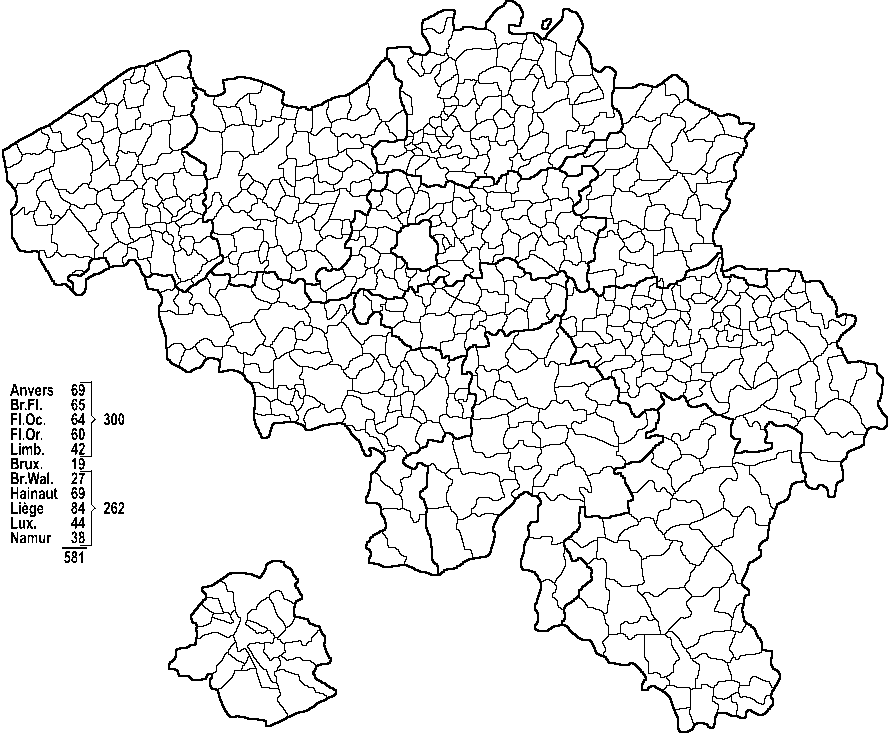
10 provinces and 589 municipalities

Starting with the 2006 local elections, these elections are organised by the three Regions (Flanders, Brussels and Wallonia). These elections still coincide, with legislatures of 6 years. The last local elections were the October 2018 elections.

==== Provincial elections ====
The Flemish and Walloon Region both have five provinces each. These ten have directly elected provincial councils. Both regions decreased the number of provincial councillors starting with the 2012 elections.

==== Municipal elections ====
All three regions have municipalities with municipal councils. Unlike all other levels, the seats in the municipal councils are apportioned using the Imperiali method, which slightly favours larger parties to ensure more stable coalitions.

==== District elections ====
The largest cities in Belgium have the possibility of installing urban districts. Only the city of Antwerp made use of this, which consequently has nine districts with their own directly elected district councils in addition to the municipal council of Antwerp.

== Vote counting and seat attribution ==
The objective of elections in Belgium is to elect the members or a legislative council, from the Chamber of Representatives of the Federal Parliament to the local municipal council. The Belgian system does not elect members of the executive or the judicial branch. Vote counting is a very serious matter, to prevent voter fraud (that was committed in the early days of Belgian democracy). The objective of vote counting in Belgium's proportional system is to attribute a number of seats to candidates of different parties. 2 attribution calculation systems are in place, unlike all other levels, the seats in the municipal councils are attributed using the Imperiali method, while in all supra-local elections where the jurisdiction of the legislative council covers more than one electoral district (like the provincial, regional, federal or European elections) the D'Hondt method is used. These systems are however made more complex by the use of different types of votes such as list or party vote, a single nominal vote or a compounded nominal vote, and a vote transfers between candidates of party using Imperiali quota or STV.

== Referendums ==
Binding referendums in Belgium are not legally possible because of the constitutional principle that the country's powers are exercised by the nation and not by the people. Consequently, Belgium is a representative democracy, almost without any form of direct democracy.

The Constitution did neither allow for non-binding referendums, but in 1950 a referendum was organised anyway with the question whether King Leopold III should return to the throne. There were large regional differences in the results, and no national referendum has been held ever since.

In the 1990s though, new laws and eventually a constitutional amendment allowed for non-binding referendums on the municipal and provincial level. A 2005 constitutional change made the Regions responsible for these local referendums. They are however still rarely organised. Article 39bis allows regional non-binding referendums.

== Past elections ==
The latest federal elections took place on 9 June 2024.

=== Evolution of election results ===
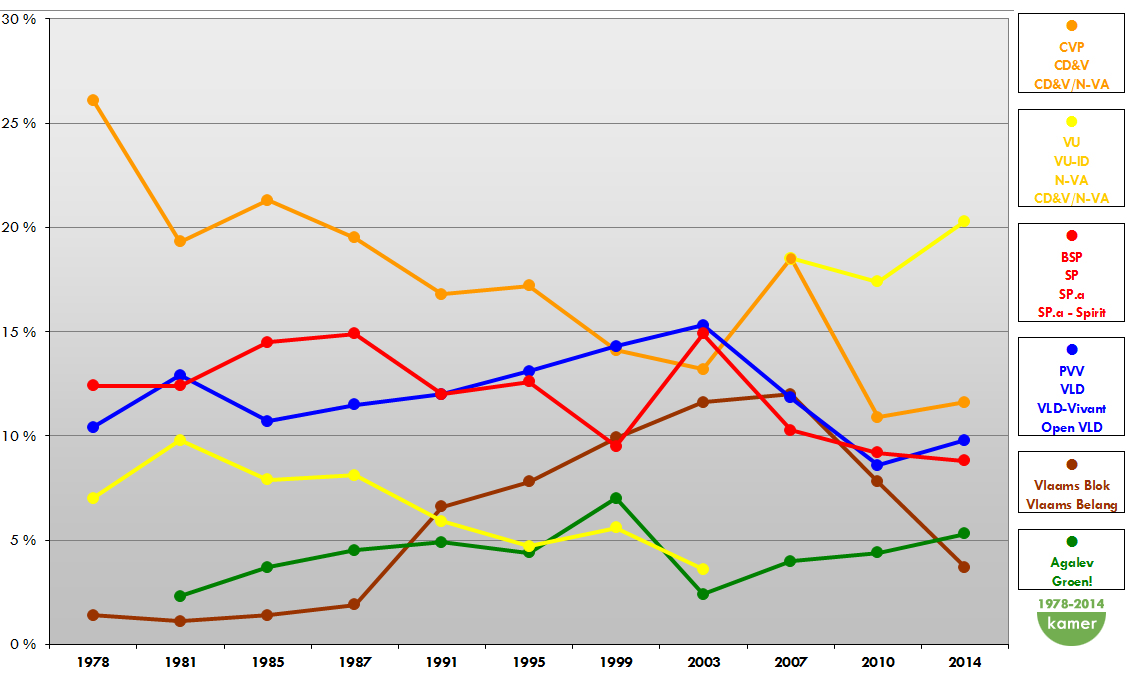
The primary six Flemish political parties and their results for the House of Representatives (Kamer). From 1978 to 2014, in percentages for the complete 'Kingdom'.

=== Results ===
Flemish elections

Year	CVP CD&V	VB	SP SP.A	VLD	VU VU-ID N-VA	LDD	AGALEV GROEN	UF	PVDA	Others
1995 regional	26.78	12.33	19.45	20.18	8.96	—	7.08	1.17	0.58	
1999 regional	22.09	15.54	15.00	22.04	9.25	—	11.62	0.94	0.61	
2004 regional	26.09	24.15	19.66	19.79	*	—	7.60	1.07	0.56	
2007 federal	29.6	19.0	16.3	18.8	*	6.5	6.3	—	—	
2009 regional	22.86	15.28	15.27	14.99	13.06	7.62	6.77	1.15	1.04	
2010 federal	17.60	12.60	14.99	14.02	28.23	3.74	7.11	—	1.3	
2014 federal	18.7	5.9	14.2	15.7	32.6	0.7	8.6	—	2.8	

== See also ==
- Voting rights in Belgium
- Electronic voting in Belgium
- Political parties in Belgium
- Political parties in Flanders
- List of elections in Belgium
- Electoral calendar
- Electoral system
