= Constituencies of Belgium =

Parliamentary constituencies used for elections in Belgium

Constituencies are used for elections in Belgium.

== Federal parliament ==
- Antwerp
- Brussels
- East Flanders
- Flemish Brabant
- Hainaut
- Liège
- Limburg
- Luxembourg
- Namur
- Walloon Brabant
- West Flanders

== European parliament ==
- Dutch-speaking electoral college
- French-speaking electoral college
- German-speaking electoral college

== Flemish parliament ==
- Antwerp
- East Flanders
- Flemish Brabant
- Limburg
- West Flanders
- Brussels

== Wallonia parliament ==
- Arlon-Marche-en-Famenne-Bastogne-Neufchâteau-Virton
- Charleroi-Thuin
- Dinant-Philippeville
- Huy-Waremme
- Liège
- Mons
- Namur
- Nivelles
- Soignies
- Tournai-Ath-Mouscron
- Verviers
