= Arrondissements of Belgium =

43 administrative subdivisions of Belgium

Arrondissements of Belgium (plural in Dutch: arrondissementen) are subdivisions below the provinces of Belgium. There are administrative, judicial and electoral arrondissements. These may or may not relate to identical geographical areas.

Belgium, a federalized state, geographically consists of three regions, of which only Flanders and Wallonia are subdivided into five provinces each; Brussels is neither a province nor is it part of one.

== Administrative ==
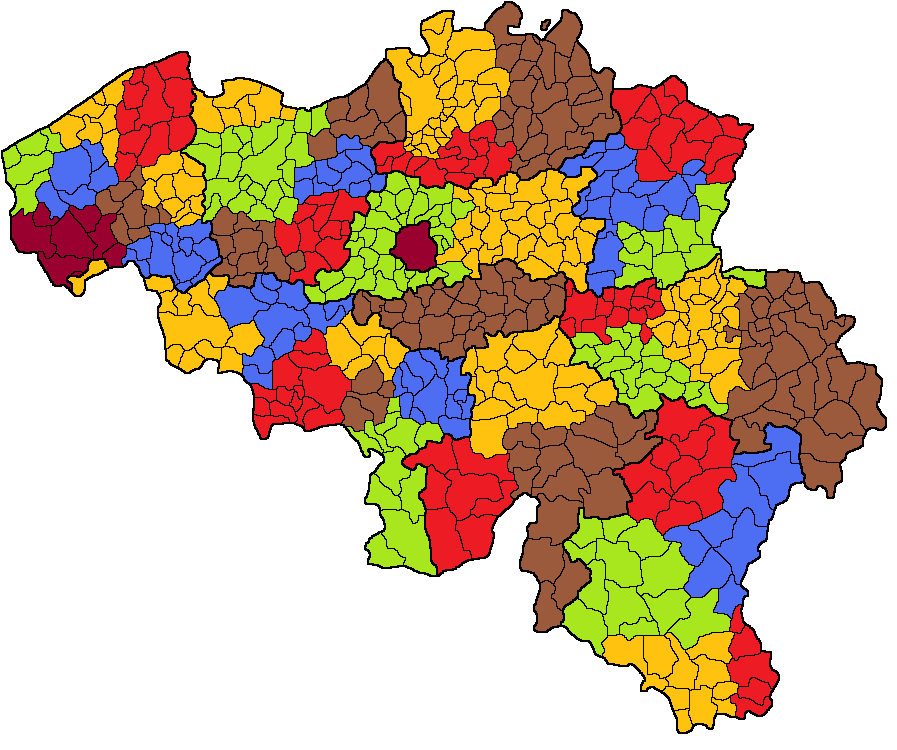
Administrative arrondissements of Belgium

The 43 administrative arrondissements are an administrative level between the municipalities and the provinces. Brussels-Capital forms a single arrondissement for all 19 municipalities in the region by that name.

Dutch name	French name	HASC	NUTS	NIS/INS	In province	Population (as of Jan. 1, 2018)	Municipalities
Aalst	Alost	BE.OV.AL	BE231	41	East Flanders	289,175	10
Aarlen	Arlon	BE.LX.AR	BE341	81	Luxembourg	62,202	5
Antwerpen	Anvers	BE.AN.AW	BE211	11	Antwerp	1,045,593	30
Aat	Ath	BE.HT.AT	BE321	51	Hainaut	86,782	8
Bastenaken	Bastogne	BE.LX.BS	BE342	82	Luxembourg	48,183	8
Brugge	Bruges	BE.WV.BG	BE251	31	West Flanders	281,780	10
Brussel-Hoofdstad	Bruxelles-Capitale	BE.BU.BR	BE100	21	N/A	1,198,726	19
-	Charleroi	BE.HT.CR	BE322	52	Hainaut	430,701	14
Dendermonde	Termonde	BE.OV.DM	BE232	42	East Flanders	200,307	10
Diksmuide	Dixmude	BE.WV.DK	BE252	32	West Flanders	51,428	5
-	Dinant	BE.NA.DN	BE351	91	Namur	110,610	15
Eeklo	-	BE.OV.EK	BE233	43	East Flanders	84,591	6
Gent	Gand	BE.OV.GT	BE234	44	East Flanders	556,916	17
Halle-Vilvoorde	Hal-Vilvorde	BE.VB.HV	BE241	23	Flemish Brabant	632,134	35
Hasselt	-	BE.LI.HS	BE221	71	Limburg	427,010	17
Hoei	Huy	BE.LG.HY	BE331	61	Liège	113,097	17
Ieper	Ypres	BE.WV.IP	BE253	33	West Flanders	106,251	8
Kortrijk	Courtrai	BE.WV.KR	BE254	34	West Flanders	289,114	12
Leuven	Louvain	BE.VB.LV	BE242	24	Flemish Brabant	506,355	30
Luik	Liège	BE.LG.LG	BE332	62	Liège	623,953	24
Maaseik	-	BE.LI.MS	BE222	72	Limburg	240,511	12
-	Marche-en-Famenne	BE.LX.MR	BE343	83	Luxembourg	56,143	9
Mechelen	Malines	BE.AN.MH	BE212	12	Antwerp	342,945	12
Bergen	Mons	BE.HT.MN	BE323	53	Hainaut	258,608	13
Namen	Namur	BE.NA.NM	BE352	92	Namur	316,058	16
-	Neufchâteau	BE.LX.NC	BE344	84	Luxembourg	63,041	12
Nijvel	Nivelles	BE.BW.NV	BE310	25	Walloon Brabant	401,106	27
Oostende	Ostende	BE.WV.OS	BE255	35	West Flanders	156,468	7
Oudenaarde	Audenarde	BE.OV.OD	BE235	45	East Flanders	123,868	10
-	Philippeville	BE.NA.PV	BE353	93	Namur	66,405	7
Roeselare	Roulers	BE.WV.RS	BE256	36	West Flanders	151,873	8
Sint-Niklaas	Saint-Nicolas	BE.OV.SN	BE236	46	East Flanders	250,196	7
Zinnik	Soignies	BE.HT.SG	BE325	55	Hainaut	190,334	8
-	Thuin	BE.HT.TN	BE326	56	Hainaut	151,912	14
Tielt	-	BE.WV.TL	BE257	37	West Flanders	92,615	9
Tongeren	Tongres	BE.LI.TG	BE223	73	Limburg	203,359	13
Doornik-Moeskroen	Tournai-Mouscron			57	Hainaut	223,417	12
-	La Louvière			58	Hainaut	140,969	4
Turnhout	-	BE.AN.TH	BE213	13	Antwerp	458,948	27
-	Verviers	BE.LG.VV	BE335; BE336	63	Liège	287,374	29
Veurne	Furnes	BE.WV.VR	BE258	38	West Flanders	61,530	5
-	Virton	BE.LX.VT	BE345	85	Luxembourg	53,658	10
Borgworm	Waremme	BE.LG.WR	BE334	64	Liège	80,902	14

As an exception, the arrondissement of Verviers has two NUTS codes: BE335 for the French-speaking part and BE336 for the German-speaking part. The latter is identical to the area of the German-speaking community.

== Judicial ==
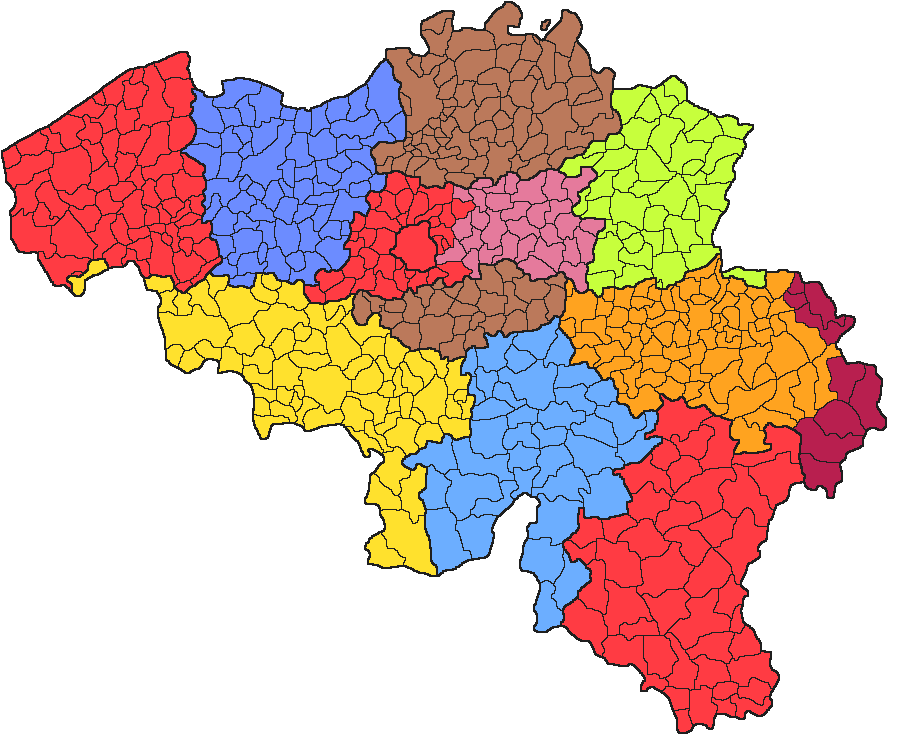
Judicial arrondissements of Belgium

Belgium has 12 judicial arrondissements:

- The arrondissement Liège covers the French-speaking part of the province of Liège
- The arrondissement Eupen covers the German-speaking part of the province of Liège
- The arrondissement Brussels covers the Capital Region and the administrative arrondissement of Halle-Vilvoorde (western part of Flemish Brabant province)
- The arrondissement Leuven covers the administrative arrondissement of Leuven (eastern part of Flemish Brabant province)
- The remaining 8 arrondissements are coterminous with, and have the same names as, the remaining 8 provinces

Until March 31, 2014 Belgium had 27 judicial arrondissements. These are now sections of today's 12 judicial arrondissements. In addition, the arrondissement Brussels was divided into the sections Brussels and Halle-Vilvoorde.

Judicial arrondissement	Sections
Antwerp	Antwerp, Mechelen, Turnhout
Brussels	Brussels, Halle-Vilvoorde
Eupen	Eupen
East Flanders	Dendermonde, Ghent, Oudenaarde
Hainaut	Charleroi, Mons, Tournai
Leuven	Leuven
Limburg	Hasselt, Tongeren
Liège	Huy, Liège, Verviers
Luxembourg	Arlon, Marche-en-Famenne, Neufchâteau
Namur	Dinant, Namur
Walloon Brabant	Nivelles
West Flanders	Bruges, Kortrijk, Veurne, Ypres

== Electoral ==
Until the end of 1999 the electoral districts for the election of the parliaments were electoral arrondissements; since the start of 2000 these are the ten provinces. The arrondissement of Brussels-Capital (geographically coinciding with the Brussels-Capital Region) is not part of any province and consequently forms its own electoral district.

As the only part of Belgium, the Parliament of Wallonia still uses electoral arrondissements. Each electoral arrondissement consists of at least one (administrative) arrondissement. There were previously 13 such electoral districts, but they have since been reduced to 11. Each of these electoral districts take their names from the arrondissements they consist of, usually decreasing in order of population.

Electoral arrondissement	Province part of
Arlon-Marche-en-Famenne-Bastogne-Neufchâteau-Virton	Luxembourg
Mons	Hainaut
Charleroi-Thuin	Hainaut
Dinant-Philippeville	Namur
Tournai-Ath-Mouscron	Hainaut
Huy-Waremme	Liège
Liège	Liège
Namur	Namur
Nivelles	Walloon Brabant
Soignies	Hainaut
Verviers	Liège

== See also ==
- Municipalities in Belgium
- Communities, regions and language areas of Belgium
