= Thuin (Walloon Parliament constituency) =

Former Belgian regional legislative constituency

- Walloon Parliament constituency
- Thuin within Hainaut

Current constituency
- Created: 1995
- Seats: 3

Thuin was a parliamentary constituency in Belgium used to elect members of the Walloon Parliament from 1995 to 2014. It corresponds to the Arrondissement of Thuin.

== Representatives ==
| Election | MWP (Party) | MWP (Party) | MWP (Party) |
|---|---|---|---|
| 1995 | Willy Burgeon (PS) | Daniel Ducarme (PRL) | Bernard Baille (Ecolo) |
| 1999 | André Navez (PS) | Michel Huin (PRL) | Paul Furlan (PS) |
| 2004 | Françoise Fassiaux-Looten (PS) | Laurent Devin (PS) | Paul Furlan (PS) |
| 2009 | Françoise Fassiaux-Looten (PS) | Yves Binon (MR) | Virginie Gonzalez-Moyano (PS) |
| 2014 | Paul Furlan (PS) | Marie-Françoise Nicaise (MR) | Virginie Gonzalez-Moyano (PS) |
| 2019 | Merged into Charleroi-Thuin | | |
