= Charleroi (Walloon Parliament constituency) =

Parliamentary constituency in Belgium

- Walloon Parliament constituency
- Charleroi within Hainaut

Current constituency
- Created: 1995
- Seats: 9

Charleroi was a parliamentary constituency in Belgium used to elect members of the Walloon Parliament from 1995 to 2014. It corresponds to the Arrondissement of Charleroi.

== Representatives ==
Election	MWP (Party)	MWP (Party)	MWP (Party)	MWP (Party)	MWP (Party)	MWP (Party)	MWP (Party)	MWP (Party)	MWP (Party)	MWP (Party)
1995	Paul Ficheroulle (PS)	Anne-Marie Salmon-Verbayst (PS)	Francis Poty (PS)	Anne-Marie Corbisier-Hagon (CDH)	Alain Sadaune (FN)	Christian Dupont (PS)	Jacques Hubert (FN)	Olivier Chastel (PRL)	Philippe Charlier (PSC)	Xavier Desgain (Ecolo)
1999	Paul Ficheroulle (PS)	Michel Filleul (PS)	Francis Poty (PS)	Anne-Marie Corbisier-Hagon (CDH)	Alain Sadaune (FN)	Monique Vlaminck-Moreau (Ecolo)	Philippe Fontaine (MR)	Véronique Cornet (MR)	Philippe Charlier (PSC)	Xavier Desgain (Ecolo)
2004	Paul Ficheroulle (PS)	Jean-Claude Van Cauwenberghe (PS)	Ingrid Colicis (PS)	Anne-Marie Corbisier-Hagon (CDH)	Charles Petitjean (FN)	Daniel Huygens (FN)	Philippe Fontaine (MR)	Véronique Cornet (MR)	Pol Calet (PS)	9 seats
2009	Hugues Bayet (PS)	Latifa Gahouchi (PS)	Graziana Trotta (PS)	Antoine Tanzilli (CDH)	Christian Dupont (PS)	Isabelle Meerhaeghe (Ecolo)	Xavier Desgain (Ecolo)	Véronique Cornet (MR)	Sophie Pécriaux (PS)	9 seats
2014	Anthony Dufrane (PS)	Latifa Gahouchi (PS)	Graziana Trotta (PS)	Véronique Salvi (CDH)	Serdar Kilic (PS)	Nicolas Tzanetatos (MR)	Patricia Potigny (MR)	Philippe Knaepen (MR)	Sophie Pécriaux (PS)	9 seats
2019	Merged into Charleroi-Thuin									
