= Tournai-Ath-Mouscron (Walloon Parliament constituency) =

- Walloon Parliament constituency
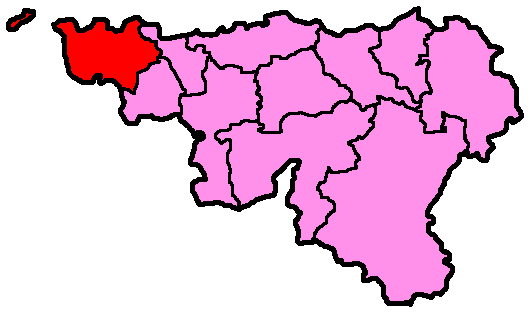

Current constituency
- Created: 1995
- Seats: 7

Tournai-Ath-Mouscron is a parliamentary constituency in Belgium used to elect members of the Parliament of Wallonia since 1995. It corresponds to the arrondissements of Tournai, Ath and Mouscron.

== Representatives ==
Representatives of Tournai-Ath-Mouscron (1995–present)
| Election | MWP (Party) | MWP (Party) | MWP (Party) | MWP (Party) | MWP (Party) | MWP (Party) | MWP (Party) |
|---|---|---|---|---|---|---|---|
| 1995 | Christian Massy (PS) | Jean-Pierre Perdieu (PS) | Chantal Bertouille (MR) | Guy Spitaels (PS) | Arnaud Decléty (PRL) | Georges Sénéca (PSC) | Jean-Paul Snappe (Ecolo) |
| 1999 | Pierre Wacquier (PS) | Jean-Pierre Perdieu (PS) | Chantal Bertouille (MR) | Luc Tiberghien (Ecolo) | Claudy Huart (PRL) | Christian Brotcorne (PSC) | Michel Guilbert (Ecolo) |
| 2004 | Pierre Wacquier (PS) | Daniel Senesael (PS) | Chantal Bertouille (MR) | Paul-Olivier Delannois (PS) | Damien Yzerbyt (CDH) | Monique Willocq (CDH) | Philippe Bracaval (MR) |
| 2009 | Annick Saudoyer (PS) | Daniel Senesael (PS) | Chantal Bertouille (MR) | Luc Tiberghien (Ecolo) | Alfred Gadenne (CDH) | Idès Cauchie (CDH) | Adrien Dolimont (MR) |
| 2014 | Christiane Vienne (PS) | Jean-Pierre Denis (PS) | Stéphane Delfosse (MR) | Luc Van der Stichelen (PS) | Mathilde Vandorpe (CDH) | Veronique Waroux (CDH) | Véronique Durenne (MR) |
| 2019 | Rudy Demotte (PS) | Fatima Ahallouch (PS) | Jean-Luc Cruke (MR) | Bénédicte Linard (Ecolo) | Mathilde Vandorpe (CDH) | Jori Dupont (PTB) | Alice Leeuwerck (MR) |
| 2024 | Bruno Lefèbvre (PS) | Dorothée De Rodder (PS) | Marie-Christine Marghem (MR) | Bénédicte Linard (Ecolo) | Mathilde Vandorpe (Les Engagés) | Jori Dupont (PTB) | Vincent Palmero (MR) |
