= Mons (Walloon Parliament constituency) =

- Walloon Parliament constituency
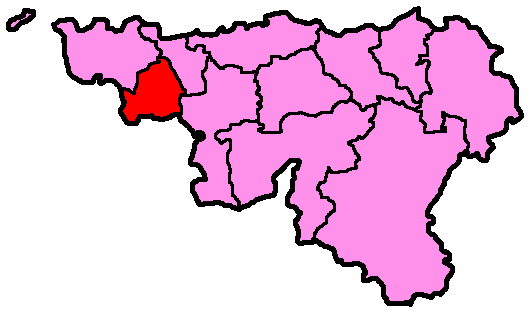
- Mons within Hainaut

Current constituency
- Created: 1995
- Seats: 5

Mons is a parliamentary constituency in Belgium used to elect members of the Parliament of Wallonia since 1995. It corresponds to the Arrondissement of Mons.

== Representatives ==
Representatives of Mons (1995–present)
Election	MWP (Party)	MWP (Party)	MWP (Party)	MWP (Party)	MWP (Party)	MWP (Party)
1995	Didier Donfut (PS)	Freddy Deghilage (PS)	Yvon Biefnot (PS)	Albert Liénard (PSC)	Dominique Cogels-Le Grelle (PSC)	Raymond Hinnekens (PRL)
1999	Didier Donfut (PS)	Freddy Deghilage (PS)	Richard Biefnot (PS)	Albert Liénard (PSC)	Richard Miller (MR)	Daniel Josse (Ecolo)
2004	Joëlle Kapompole (PS)	Freddy Deghilage (PS)	Marc Barvais (PS)	Carlo Di Antonio (CDH)	Richard Miller (MR)	Jean-Pierre Borbouse (FN)
2009	Joëlle Kapompole (PS)	Pierre Tachenion (PS)	Catherine Houdart (PS)	Savine Moucheron (CDH)	Richard Miller (MR)	Emmanuel Disabato (Ecolo)
2014	Joëlle Kapompole (PS)	Pierre Tachenion (PS)	Nicolas Martin (PS)	Savine Moucheron (CDH)	Jacqueline Galant (MR)	5 seats
2019	Joëlle Kapompole (PS)	Jean-Pierre Lepine (PS)	Emmanuel Disabato (Ecolo)	John Beugnies (PTB)	Jacqueline Galant (MR)	5 seats
2024	Nicolas Martin (PS)	Florence Monier (PS)	Pascal Baurain (Les Engagés)	Guillaume Souphart (MR)	Jacqueline Galant (MR)	5 seats
