= Dinant-Philippeville (Walloon Parliament constituency) =

- Walloon Parliament constituency
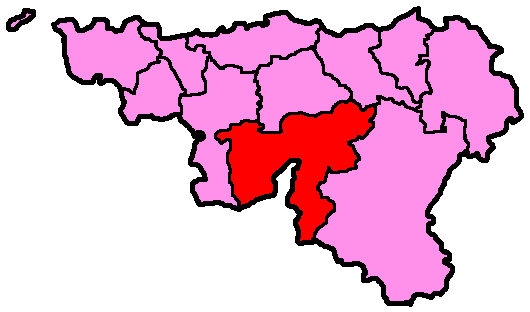

Current constituency
- Created: 1995
- Seats: 4

Dinant-Philippeville is a parliamentary constituency in Belgium used to elect members of the Parliament of Wallonia since 1995. It corresponds to the arrondissements of Dinant and Philippeville.

== Representatives ==
Representatives of Dinant-Philippeville (1995–present)
Election	MWP (Party)	MWP (Party)	MWP (Party)	MWP (Party)
1995	Maurice Bayenet (PS)	Guy Saulmont (PRL)	Michel Barbeaux (PSC)	3 seats
1999	Maurice Bayenet (PS)	Guy Saulmont (PRL)	Michel Lebrun (CDH)	3 seats
2004	Maurice Bayenet (PS)	Guy Milcamps (PS)	Michel Lebrun (CDH)	Willy Borsus (MR)
2009	Jean-Claude Maene (PS)	Patrick Dupriez (Ecolo)	Michel Lebrun (CDH)	Willy Borsus (MR)
2014	Christine Poulin (PS)	Pierre-Yves Dermagne (PS)	Laetitia Brogniez (MR)	Pierre Helson (MR)
2019	Christophe Bastin (CDH/ Les Engagés)	Pierre-Yves Dermagne (PS)	François Bellot (MR)	Françoise Mathieux (MR)
2024	Christophe Bastin (CDH/ Les Engagés)	Eddy Fontaine (PS)	Richard Fornaux (MR)	Valérie Warzée-Caverenne (MR)
