= Verviers (Walloon Parliament constituency) =

- Walloon Parliament constituency
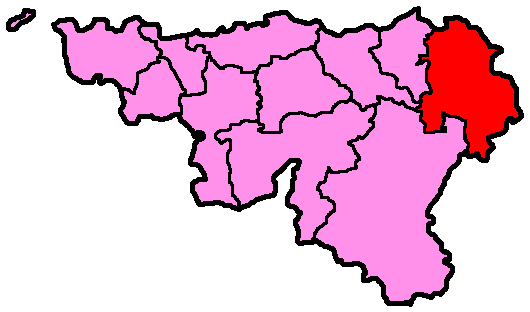
- Verviers within Liège

Current constituency
- Created: 1995
- Seats: 6

Verviers is a parliamentary constituency in Belgium used to elect members of the Parliament of Wallonia since 1995. It corresponds to the Arrondissement of Verviers.

== Representatives ==
Representatives of Verviers (1995–present)
Election	MWP (Party)	MWP (Party)	MWP (Party)	MWP (Party)	MWP (Party)	MWP (Party)
1995	Jean-François Istasse (PS)	René Thissen (CDH)	Alfred Evers (PRL)	Daniel Smeets (Ecolo)	Joseph Houssa (PRL)	Pierre Wintgens (PSC)
1999	Jean-François Istasse (PS)	René Thissen (CDH)	Edmund Stoffels (PS)	Daniel Smeets (Ecolo)	André Damseaux (PRL)	Elmar Keutgen (PSC)
2004	Jean-François Istasse (PS)	René Thissen (CDH)	Edmund Stoffels (PS)	Monika Dethier-Neumann (Ecolo)	Herbert Grommes (CDH)	Jean-Claude Meurens (MR)
2009	Muriel Targnion (PS)	Jean-Paul Bastin (CDH)	Edmund Stoffels (PS)	Monika Dethier-Neumann (Ecolo)	Matthieu Daele (Ecolo)	Pierre-Yves Jeholet (MR)
2014	Jean-François Istasse (PS)	Isabelle Stommen (CDH)	Edmund Stoffels (PS)	Charles Gardier (MR)	Matthieu Daele (Ecolo)	Jenny Baltus-Möres (MR)
2019	André Frédéric (PS)	Marie-Martine Schyns (CDH)	Samuel Nemes (PTB)	Pierre-Yves Jeholet (MR)	Anne Kelleter (Ecolo)	Christine Mauel (MR)
2024	Valérie Dejardin (PS)	Patrick Spies (PS)	Jean-Paul Bastin (Les Engagés)	Charles Gardier (MR)	Freddy Mockel (Ecolo)	Christine Mauel (MR)
