= Soignies (Walloon Parliament constituency) =

- Walloon Parliament constituency
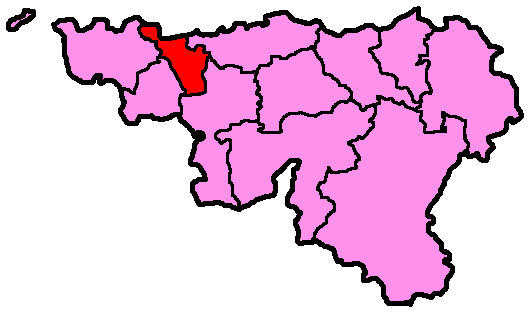
- Soignies within Hainaut

Current constituency
- Created: 1995
- Seats: 8

Soignies is a parliamentary constituency in Belgium used to elect members of the Parliament of Wallonia since 1995. It corresponds to the Arrondissement of Soignies.

== Representatives ==
Representatives of Soignies (1995–present)
Election	MWP (Party)	MWP (Party)	MWP (Party)	MWP (Party)
1995	Maurice Bodson (PS)	Jean-Paul Vancrombruggen (PS)	Guy Hollogne (PSC)	Guy Pierard (PRL)
1999	Maurice Bodson (PS)	Marc de Saint Moulin (PS)	Guy Hollogne (PSC)	Florine Pary-Mille (MR)
2004	Maurice Bodson (PS)	Marc de Saint Moulin (PS)	Jean-Paul Procureur (CDH)	Florine Pary-Mille (MR)
2009	Olga Zrihen (PS)	Marc de Saint Moulin (PS)	Bénédicte Linard (Ecolo)	Florine Pary-Mille (MR)
2014	Olga Zrihen (PS)	Patrick Prévot (PS)	François Desquesnes (CDH)	Olivier Destrebecq (MR)
