= Charleroi-Thuin (Walloon Parliament constituency) =

Parliament of Wallonia constituency

- Walloon Parliament constituency
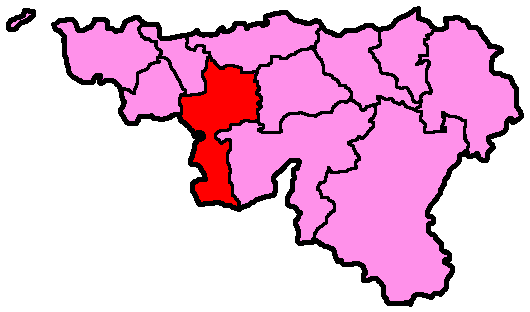

Current constituency
- Created: 2019
- Seats: 10

Charleroi-Thuin is a parliamentary constituency in Belgium used to elect members of the Parliament of Wallonia from 2019. It corresponds to the arrondissements of Charleroi and Thuin. It was created from the former constituencies of Charleroi and Thuin and was first contested for the 2019 Belgian regional elections.

== Representatives ==
Representatives of Charleroi-Thuin (1995–present)
Election	MWP (Party)	MWP (Party)	MWP (Party)	MWP (Party)	MWP (Party)	MWP (Party)	MWP (Party)	MWP (Party)	MWP (Party)	MWP (Party)
2019	Formed from a merger of Charleroi and Thuin									
2019	Nicolas Tzanetatos (MR)	Rachel Sobry (MR)	Germain Mugemangango (PTB)	Amandine Pavet (PTB)	Paul Furlan (PS)	Latifa Gahouchi (PS)	Mourad Sahli (PS)	Philippe Blanchart (PS)	Christophe Clersy (Ecolo)	Julien Matagne (CDH)
2024	Adrien Dolimont (MR)	Caroline Taquin (MR)	Germain Mugemangango (PTB)	Jamila Ammi (PTB)	Thomas Dermine (PS)	Özlem Özen (PS)	Mourad Sahli (PS)	Tanguy Dardenne (MR)	Jean-Jaques Cloquet (Les Engagés)	Caroline Desalle (Les Engagés)
