= Namur (Walloon Parliament constituency) =

- Walloon Parliament constituency
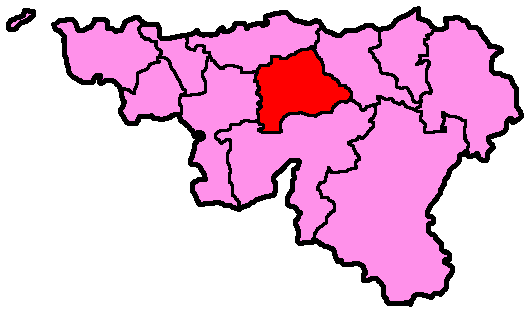
- Namur

Current constituency
- Created: 1995
- Seats: 7

Namur is a parliamentary constituency in Belgium used to elect members of the Parliament of Wallonia since 1995. It corresponds to the Arrondissement of Namur.

== Representatives ==
Representatives of Namur (1995–present)
Election	MWP (Party)	MWP (Party)	MWP (Party)	MWP (Party)	MWP (Party)	MWP (Party)	MWP (Party)
1995	Nicole Docq (PS)	Gil Gilles (PS)	Jacques Étienne (CDH)	Jean-Marie Severin (MR)	Léon Malisoux (PS)	Daniel Marchant (Ecolo)	6 seats
1999	Nicole Docq (PS)	Gil Gilles (PS)	Jacques Étienne (CDH)	Jean-Marie Severin (MR)	Marie-Rose Cavalier-Bohon (Ecolo)	Pierre Hardy (Ecolo)	6 seats
2004	Nicole Docq (PS)	Jean-Charles Luperto (PS)	Jacques Étienne (CDH)	Jean-Marie Severin (MR)	Eliane Tillieux (PS)	Anne Barzin (MR)	6 seats
2009	Claude Eerdekens (PS)	Jean-Charles Luperto (PS)	Maxime Prévot (CDH)	Gilles Mouyard (MR)	Stéphane Hazée (Ecolo)	Anne Barzin (MR)	6 seats
2014	Eliane Tillieux (PS)	Jean-Charles Luperto (PS)	Maxime Prévot (CDH)	Gilles Mouyard (MR)	Stéphane Hazée (Ecolo)	Laurent Henquet (MR)	Isabelle Moinnet-Joiret (CDH)
2019	Gwenaelle Grovonius (PS)	Jean-Charles Luperto (PS)	Benoît Dispa (CDH)	Sabine Laruelle (MR)	Stéphane Hazée (Ecolo)	Valérie Delporte (Ecolo)	Anouk Vandevoorde (PTB)
2024	Eliane Tillieux (PS)	Vincent Maillen (MR)	Benoît Dispa (Les Engagés)	Stéphanie Thoron (MR)	Stéphane Hazée (Ecolo)	Geneviève Lazaron (Les Engagés)	Patricia Van Walle (PTB)
