= List of members of the Parliament of the German-speaking Community, 2004–2009 =

This is a list of members of the Parliament of the German-speaking Community, Belgium, between 2004 and 2009, following the direct elections of 2004.

== Composition ==
Party	Seats	+/–
Christian Social Party (Christlich Soziale Partei, CSP)	8	▼1
Party for Freedom and Progress (Partei für Freiheit und Fortschritt, PFF)	5	▼1
Parti Socialiste (Sozialistische Partei, SP)	5	▲1
Party of German-speaking Belgians/Juropa/Independents (Partei der Deutschsprachigen Belgier/Juropa/Unabhängige, PJU)	3	0
Ecolo (ECOLO)	2	▼1
Vivant (VIVANT)	2	new
	25	

== Sources ==
- "Members of the DG Parliament". The Parliament of the German-speaking Community. Archived from the original on 15 April 2012.
