= List of members of the Council of the German-speaking Community, 1999–2004 =

This is a list of members of the Council of the German Cultural Community between 1999 and 2004, following the direct elections of 1999.

== Composition ==
| Party | Seats | +/– |
|---|---|---|
| Christian Social Party (Christlich Soziale Partei, CSP) | 9 | ▼1 |
| Party for Freedom and Progress (Partei für Freiheit und Fortschritt, PFF) | 6 | ▲1 |
| Parti Socialiste (Sozialistische Partei, SP) | 4 | 0 |
| Party of German-speaking Belgians/Juropa/Independents (Partei der Deutschsprachigen Belgier/Juropa/Unabhängige, PJU) | 3 | 0 |
| Ecolo (ECOLO) | 3 | 0 |
| | 25 | |

== Sources ==
- "Members of the DG Parliament". The Parliament of the German-speaking Community. Archived from the original on 15 April 2012.
