= List of members of the Council of the German-speaking Community, 1995–1999 =

This is a list of members of the Council of the German Cultural Community between 1995 and 1999, following the direct elections of 1995.

== Composition ==
Party	Seats	+/–
Christian Social Party (Christlich Soziale Partei, CSP)	10	▲2
Party for Freedom and Progress (Partei für Freiheit und Fortschritt, PFF)	5	0
Parti Socialiste (Sozialistische Partei, SP)	4	0
Party of German-speaking Belgians/Juropa/Independents (Partei der Deutschsprachigen Belgier/Juropa/Unabhängige, PJU)	3	▼1
Ecolo (ECOLO)	3	▼1
	25	

== Sources ==
- "Members of the DG Parliament". The Parliament of the German-speaking Community. Archived from the original on 2012-04-15.
