= Dendermonde-Sint-Niklaas (Flemish Parliament constituency) =

Belgian political subdivision

Dendermonde-Sint-Niklaas was a constituency used to elect members of the Flemish Parliament between 1995 and 2003.

== Representatives ==
Election	MFP (Party)	MFP (Party)	MFP (Party)	MFP (Party)	MFP (Party)
1995	Frans Wymeersch (VB)	Marc Cordeel (VLD)	Karel De Gucht (VLD)	Jos De Meyer (CVP)	John Taylor (CVP)
1999	Frans Wymeersch (VB)	Marc Cordeel (VLD)	Karel De Gucht (VLD)	Jos De Meyer (CVP)	Nelly Maes (VU)
