= Mechelen-Turnhout (Flemish Parliament constituency) =

Mechelen-Turnhout was a constituency used to elect members of the Flemish Parliament between 1995 and 2003.

== Representatives ==
Election	MFP (Party)	MFP (Party)	MFP (Party)	MFP (Party)	MFP (Party)	MFP (Party)	MFP (Party)	MFP (Party)	MFP (Party)	MFP (Party)	MFP (Party)	MFP (Party)	MFP (Party)	MFP (Party)
1995	Jos Geysels (Agalev)	Luk Van Nieuwenhuysen (VB)	Frank Creyelman (VB)	Jef Van Looy (CVP)	Freddy Sarens (CVP)	Kathleen Helsen (CVP)	Hugo Van Rompaey (CVP)	Kris Van Dijck (VU	Marc De Laet (PS)	Jef Sleeckx (PS)	Pieter Huybrechts (VB)	Marleen Vanderpoorten (VLD)	Arnold Van Aperen (VLD)	Leo Cannaerts (CVP)
1999	Jos Geysels (Agalev)	Luk Van Nieuwenhuysen (VB)	Pieter Huybrechts (VB)	Jef Van Looy (CVP)	Freddy Sarens (CVP)	Luc Van den Brande (CVP)	Ingrid Van Kessel (CVP)	Kris Van Dijck (VU	Lucien Suykens (PS)	Jan Van Duppen (PS)	Frans De Cock (VLD)	Cis Schepens (VLD)	Peter Gysbrechts (VLD)	Margriet Hermans (VU
