= Monique Willocq =

Belgian politician

Monique Willocq is a Belgian politician, member of the Centre démocrate humaniste.

== Political career ==
Political posts held:

- Walloon MP and for the French Community since 3 July 2007
- Communal councillor of Tournai
