= Thomas Dermine =

Belgian politician (born 1986)

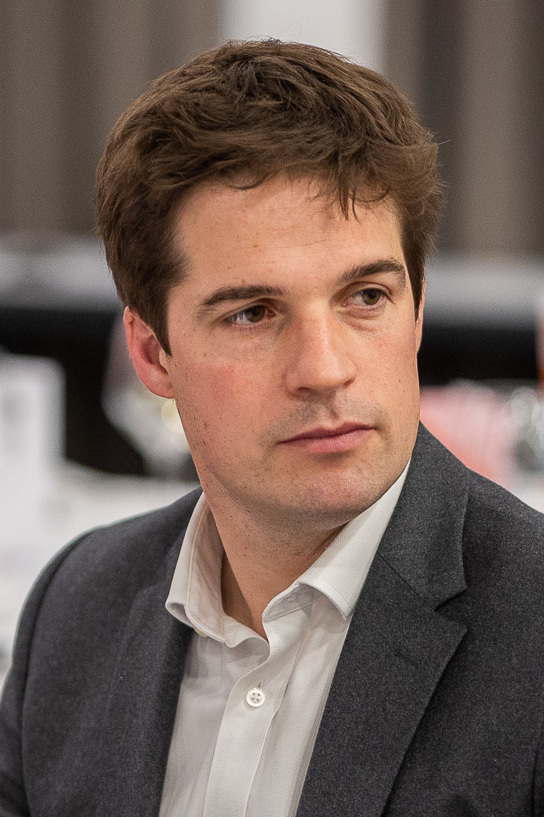
- Dermine in 2022

Mayor of Charleroi
- Incumbent
- Assumed office 2 December 2024
- Preceded by: Paul Magnette

Member of the Parliament of Wallonia
- In office 25 June 2024 – 26 June 2024
- Succeeded by: Isabella Greco
- Constituency: Charleroi-Thuin

Secretary of State for Recovery and Strategic Investments
- In office 1 October 2020 – 3 February 2025
- Prime Minister: Alexander De Croo
- Preceded by: Position established
- Succeeded by: Position abolished

Personal details
- Born: 1 May 1986 (age 40) Charleroi, Belgium
- Party: Parti Socialiste
- Education: Université libre de Bruxelles

Thomas Dermine (born 1 May 1986) is a Belgian politician of the Socialist Party who served as the secretary of state for recovery and strategic investments from October 2020 until February 2025. In the 2024 local elections, he was elected mayor of Charleroi. He was elected member of the Parliament of Wallonia in the 2024 regional elections, and served from 25 to 26 June.
