= 1990 Belgian regional elections =

On October 28, 1990, regional elections were held in the German-speaking Community of Belgium, to choose representatives for the Council of the German-speaking Community. Elections for the Flemish Council and the Walloon Council were not held until 1995.

== Council of the German-speaking Community ==
Party	Votes	%	+/–	Seats	+/–
Christian Social Party	13,178	33.60	−3.41%	8	-2
Party for Freedom and Progress	7,756	19.78	+1.01%	5	0
Socialist Party	6,407	16.34	+3.63%	4	+1
Party of German-speaking Belgians	5,982	15.25	−5.18%	4	-1
Ecolo	5,897	15.04	+8.59%	4	+3
Total	39,220	100.00	–	25	0
Valid votes	39,220	93.65			
Invalid/blank votes	2,661	6.35			
Total votes	41,881	100.00			
Registered voters/turnout	45,300	92.45			
