= Huy-Waremme (Walloon Parliament constituency) =

Walloon Parliament constituency

- Walloon Parliament constituency
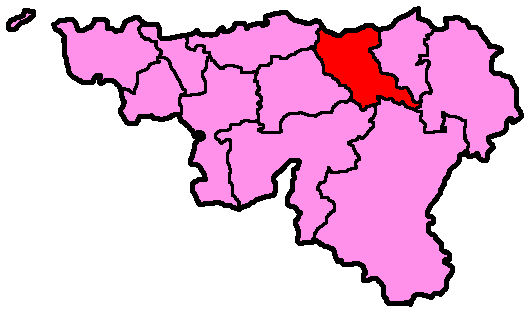

Current constituency
- Created: 1995
- Seats: 4

Huy-Waremme is a parliamentary constituency in Belgium used to elect members of the Parliament of Wallonia since 1995. It corresponds to the arrondissements of Huy and Waremme.

== Representatives ==
Representatives of Huy-Waremme (1995–present)
Election	MWP (Party)	MWP (Party)	MWP (Party)	MWP (Party)
1995	Jacques Chabot (PS)	Marc Melin (PS)	Micheline Toussaint-Richardeau (PS)	Pierre Hazette (PRL)
1999	Robert Collignon (PS)	Robert Meureau (PS)	Jean-Claude Hans (Ecolo)	Michel Joiret (PRL)
2004	Christophe Collignon (PS)	Robert Meureau (PS)	Caroline Cassart-Mailleux (MR)	Hervé Jamar (MR)
2009	Christophe Collignon (PS)	Christian Noiret (Ecolo)	Caroline Cassart-Mailleux (MR)	Hervé Jamar (MR)
2014	Christophe Collignon (PS)	Ruddy Warnier (PTB)	Magali Dock (MR)	Marie-Christine Warnant (MR)
2019	Christophe Collignon (PS)	Rodrigue Demeuse (Ecolo)	Manu Douette (MR)	Caroline Cassart-Mailleux (MR)
2024	Christophe Collignon (PS)	Marie Jacmin (Les Engagés)	Loïc Jacob (Les Engagés)	Caroline Cassart-Mailleux (MR)
