= Idès Cauchie =

Belgian politician (born 1949)

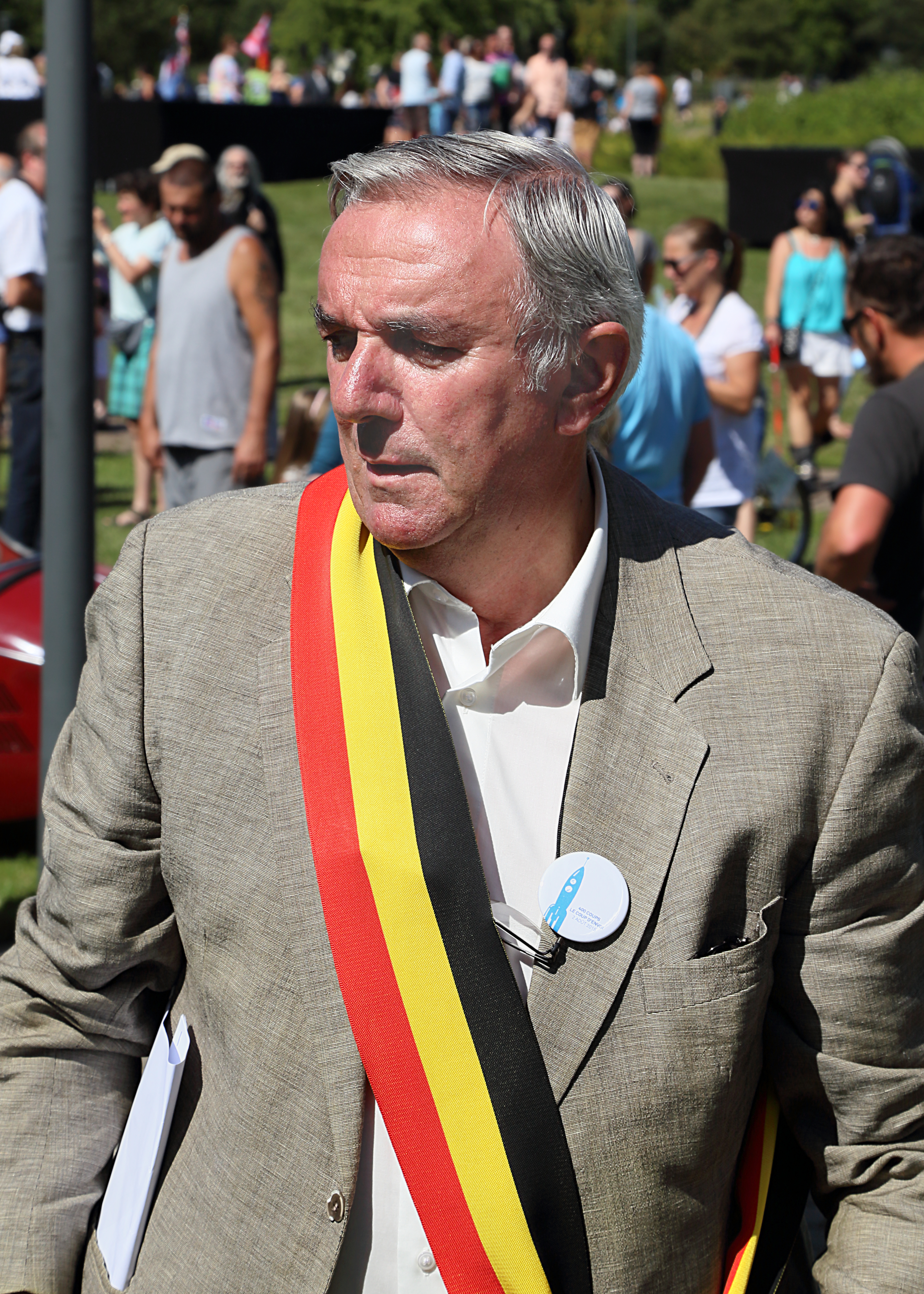
Idès Cauchie "Jamain", 2015

Idès Cauchie (born April 1949) is a Belgian politician (cdH). On 5 February 2014 he became a member of the Parliament of Wallonia following the death of Damien Yzerbyt.

== Life ==
Idesbald Cauchie was born in Schaerbeek in north-central Brussels but grew up in the countryside. He trained and qualified as a vet after which, in 1975, he moved to Ellezelles, a small town in the countryside across the Franco-Belgian border to the east of Lille. He has worked for more than thirty years as a rural vet in the Wallon province of Hainaut.

Following the example of his wife, he became a member of the local council in Ellezelles in 2000 as a representative of the centrist Humanist Democratic Centre ("Centre démocrate humaniste" / cdH) party. Since 2006 he has been the mayor of Ellezelles, which in administrative terms is a grouping of rural parishes with a total population of approximately 6,000 people. He retained his mayoral post at the 2012 elections.

In the regional elections of 2009 he was the first reserve candidate for the Tournai-Ath-Mouscron. In February 2014 Damien Yzerbyt, who had been elected to the assembly, died of pancreatic cancer and Idesbald Cauchie took on the position, taking Yzerbyt's seat in the Wallon parliament and on the parliamentary committees on which he had served. In the scheduled regional elections of May 2014 Cauchie's name appeared on the party list, but not high enough up on it for him to secure re-election.

== Personal ==
An interviewer in 2014 pointed out to him that Cauchie had come to politics rather late in life. He replied wryly, "my wife stood [in the local elections] twice before I tried it. But I was the one that received more votes, so they preferred to keep me." ("Ma femme s’est présentée deux fois avant moi, mais comme j’ai fait plus de voix, ils ont préféré me garder."). The couple have four children and, in 2014, they already had eleven grandchildren.
