= 1999 European Parliament election in Belgium =

- 13 June 1999

25 seats to the European Parliament
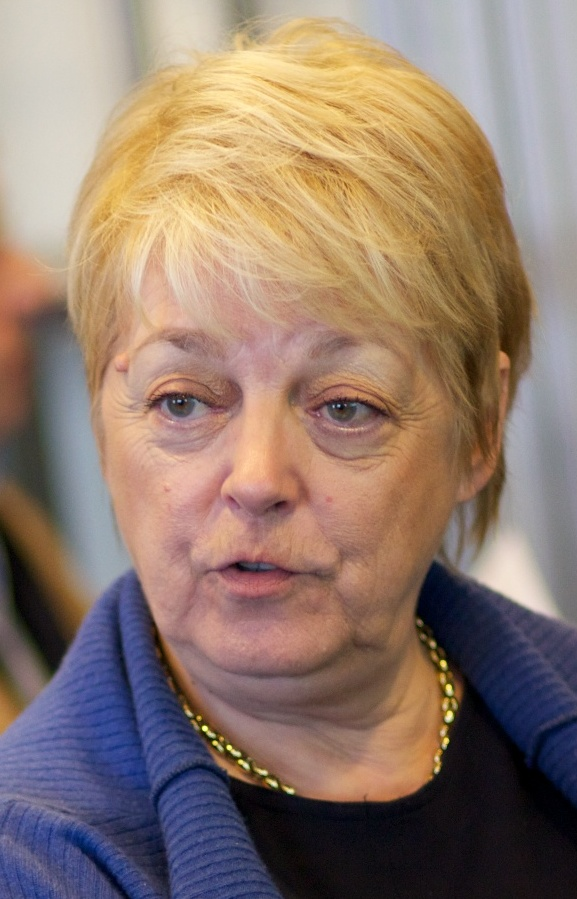

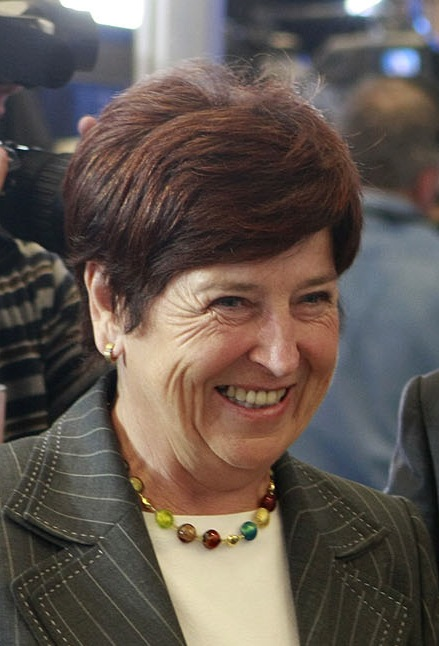

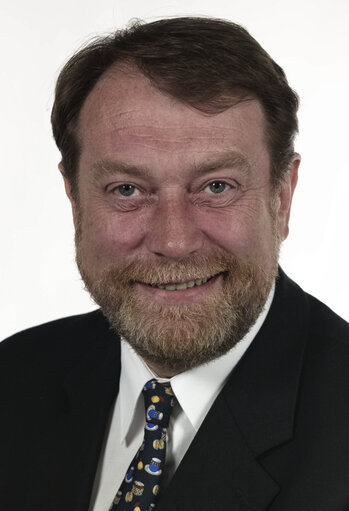

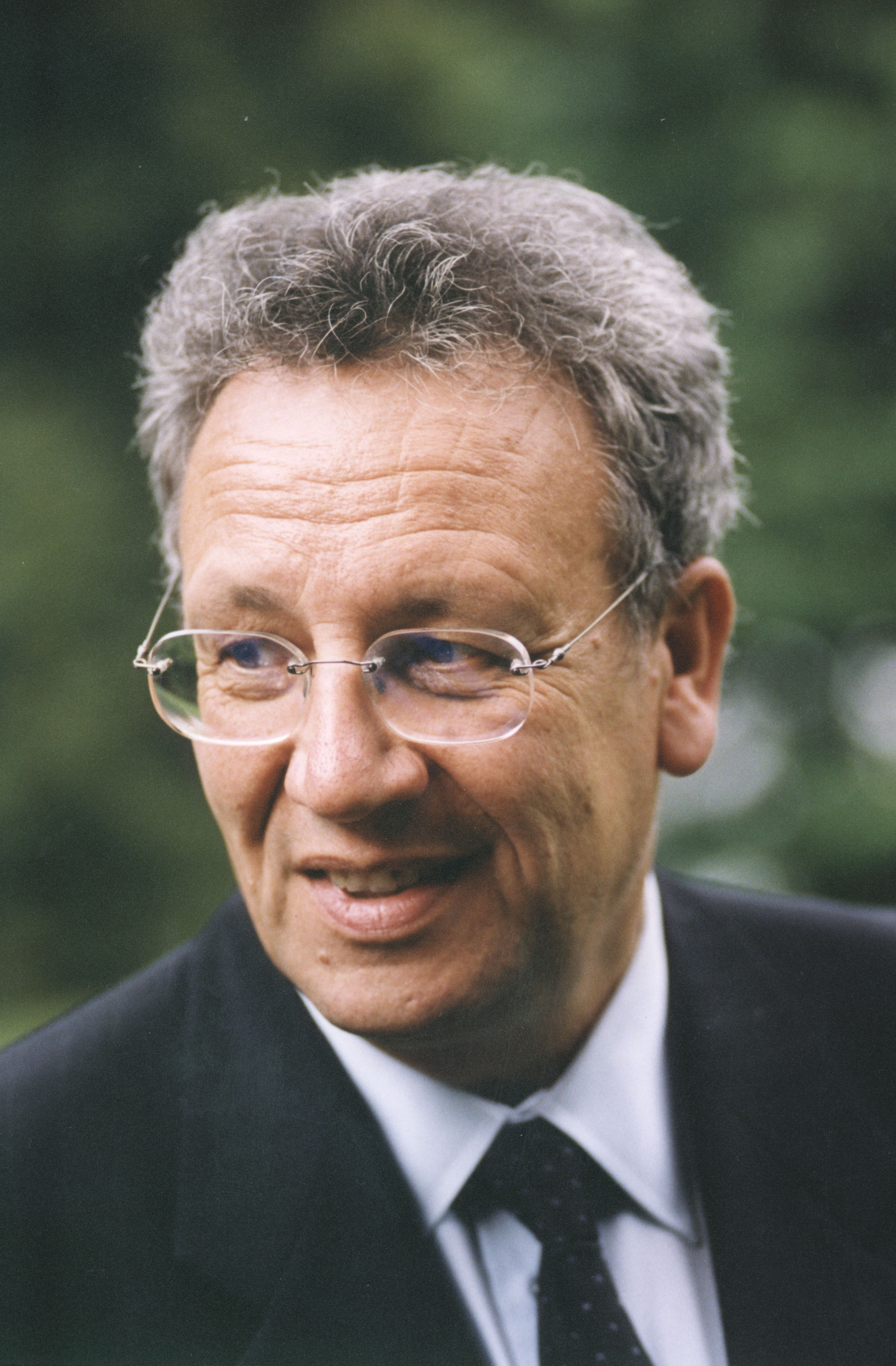
	First party	Second party
Leader	Annemie Neyts-Uyttebroeck	Miet Smet
Party	Open Vld	CVP
Alliance	ALDE	EPP
Last election	3 seats, 11.37%	4 seats, 16.98%
Seats won	3	3
Seat change	Steady	▼1
Popular vote	847,099	839,720
Percentage	13.61%	13.49%
Swing	▲2.24%	▼3.49%
	Third party	Fourth party
Leader	Daniel Ducarme	Philippe Busquin
Party	PRL	PS
Alliance	ALDE	PES
Last election	3 seats, 9.21%	3 seats, 10.92%
Seats won	3	3
Seat change	Steady	Steady
Popular vote	624,445	596,567
Percentage	10.03%	9.59%
Swing	▼0.95%	▼1.81%

Elections to the European Parliament were held in Belgium on 13 June 1999. The Dutch electoral college elected 14 MEPs, the French electoral college elected 10 MEPs and the German-speaking electoral college elected 1 MEP. The European elections were held on the same day as the federal election and the regional elections.

== Results ==
Party	Votes	%	Seats
French-speaking electoral college
Liberal Reformist Party-Democratic Front of Francophones	624,445	26.99	3
Socialist Party	596,567	25.78	3
Ecolo	525,316	22.70	3
Christian Social Party	307,912	13.31	1
National Front	94,848	4.10	0
Vivant	55,133	2.38	0
Debout	46,088	1.99	0
Communist Party of Belgium	25,539	1.10	0
New Belgian Front	24,792	1.07	0
Party for a New Politics in Belgium	10,458	0.45	0
Parti Communautaire National-Européen	2,720	0.12	0
Total	2,313,818	100.00	10
Dutch-speaking electoral college
Flemish Liberals and Democrats	847,099	21.88	3
Christian People's Party	839,720	21.68	3
Vlaams Blok	584,392	15.09	2
Flemish Socialist Party	550,237	14.21	2
People's Union	471,238	12.17	2
Agalev	464,042	11.98	2
Vivant	67,107	1.73	0
Workers' Party of Belgium	21,966	0.57	0
Party for a New Politics in Belgium	17,095	0.44	0
Social-Liberal Democrats	9,528	0.25	0
Total	3,872,424	100.00	14
German-speaking electoral college
Christian Social Party	13,456	36.47	1
Partei für Freiheit und Fortschritt	7,234	19.60	0
Ecolo	6,276	17.01	0
Socialist Party	4,215	11.42	0
Party of German-speaking Belgians	3,661	9.92	0
Vivant	1,198	3.25	0
Juropa	788	2.14	0
Workers' Party of Belgium	72	0.20	0
Total	36,900	100.00	1
Valid votes	6,186,242	93.18	
Invalid/blank votes	452,765	6.82	
Total votes	6,639,007	100.00	
Registered voters/turnout	7,297,815	90.97	
Source: Belgian Elections
