= Yvon Biefnot =

Belgian politician (1936–2026)

Member of the Chamber of Representatives of Belgium for Mons
- In office 17 April 1977 – 12 April 1995

Member of the Walloon Parliament
- In office 6 June 1995 – 21 May 1999

Personal details
- Born: 28 February 1936 Ghlin, Belgium
- Died: 16 November 2026 (aged 90)
- Party: PS
- Occupation: Civil servant

Yvon Biefnot (28 February 1936 – 16 November 2026) was a Belgian politician of the Socialist Party (PS).

Biefnot served in the Chamber of Representatives from 1977 to 1995 and in the Walloon Parliament from 1995 to 1999. He was also a member of the Parliamentary Assembly of the Council of Europe from 1988 to 1995.

Biefnot died on 16 November 2026, at the age of 90.
