= Joseph Houssa =

Belgian politician (1930–2019)

Joseph Houssa (12 April 1930 – 20 October 2019) was a Belgian politician. Born in Hotton, he worked in Congo until that country's independence. He returned to Belgium and joined the Liberal Reformist Party.

He became a municipal councilor in Spa and in 1982, became the city's mayor, a position he held until 2018. He also served in the Senate of Belgium from 1988 to 1995. Later, he was a deputy in the Parliament of Wallonia until 1999. Houssa died on 20 October 2019 in the city of Verviers.
