= Richard Biefnot =

Belgian politician (1949–2020)

Communal Councillor in Mons
- In office 1983–2009

Member of the Belgian Chamber of Representatives
- In office 1995–1999
- Preceded by: Elio Di Rupo

Member of the Parliament of Wallonia and the French Community of Belgium
- In office 1999–2004

Provincial Councillor of the Hainaut Province
- In office 2004–2009

Personal details
- Born: 24 March 1949 Mons, Belgium
- Died: 18 August 2020 (aged 71)
- Party: PS

Richard Biefnot (24 March 1949 – 18 August 2020) was a Belgian politician. He served on the Parliament of Wallonia and the Chamber of Representatives and was a member of the Socialist Party.

== Biography ==
Biefnot was a fiscal and social advisor. He served as President of the Centre de délassement du Grand Large in Mons.

On 18 May 2009, Biefnot was indicted and charged with possession of child porn, but was not convicted. However, he was expelled from the Socialist Party and resigned from his post as Communal Councillor in Mons.

Richard Biefnot died on 18 August 2020 at the age of 71.
