= Rachel Sobry =

Belgian politician (born 1993)

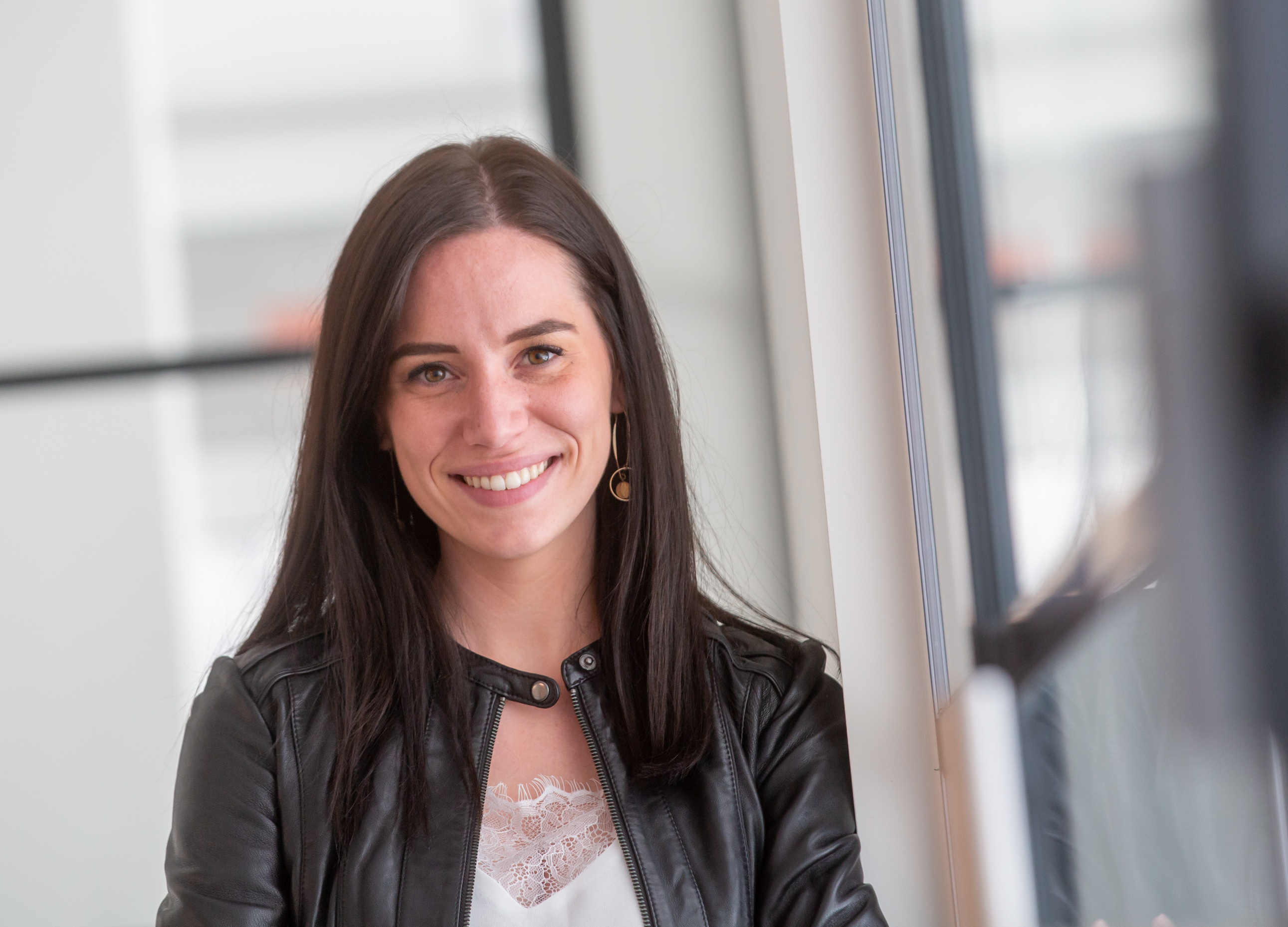

Member of the Parliament of Wallonia
- Incumbent
- Assumed office 26 May 2019

Member of the Parliament of the French Community
- Incumbent
- Assumed office 26 May 2019

Personal details
- Born: 9 May 1993 (age 32) Chimay, Belgium
- Party: Mouvement Réformateur

Rachel Sobry (French pronunciation: [ʁaʃɛl sɔbʁi]; born 9 May 1993) is a Belgian politician who serves in the Parliament of Wallonia for Mouvement Réformateur. She is currently the youngest elected member of parliament.

== Early life ==
Rachel Sobry was born on 9 May 1993 in Chimay. After receiving her bachelor's degree in political science from Saint-Louis University, she received her master's degree in public administration from Universite Catholique de Louvain.

From January 2018 to June 2019, she was an assistant in the policy office of government minister Denis Ducarme, where she worked on issues related to youth, animal welfare, commerce, and sports.

In the 2019 Belgian regional elections, Sobry was elected a Member of the Wallonian parliament and a de facto member of the Parliament of the French Community of Belgium. Sobry said her policy focuses were on "improving mobility and access to healthcare" in rural parts of Wallonia.

In Parliament, she serves on the Employment, Social Services and Health Committee, the Civil Service Committee, the Tourism and Heritage Committee, the Committee on European questions and the Special Committee on the COVID-19 pandemic in Wallonia. In the Parliament of the French Community, Sobry serves on the Budget and Civil Service Committee, as well as the Education Committee.

Sobry currently lives in Momignies with her brother, who is a student. Owing to the COVID-19 pandemic in Belgium, much of her work has been done by teleconference, only going to the parliament building for committee meetings. Sobry described serving the community during this time "like running a call center for citizens".
