= André Navez =

Belgian politician (1952–2026)

Member of the Parliament of Wallonia
- In office 12 July 1999 – 12 June 2004

Mayor of Binche
- In office 1 January 2001 – 31 December 2006
- Preceded by: Armand Le Roi
- Succeeded by: Laurent Devin

Personal details
- Born: 12 March 1952 Bienne-lez-Happart, Belgium
- Died: 8 September 2026 (aged 74)
- Party: PS
- Occupation: Clerk

André Navez (12 March 1952 – 8 September 2026) was a Belgian politician of the Socialist Party.

Navez served as a member of the Parliament of Wallonia from 1999 to 2004 and was mayor of Binche from 2001 to 2006.

Navez died on 8 September 2026, at the age of 74.
