= Pro Bruxsel =

Belgian political party

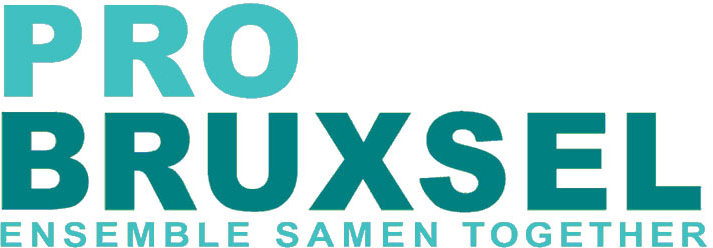
Official logo of the party (as of 2010)

Pro Bruxsel is a regional party in Brussels, the capital of Belgium. The party is one of the few bilingual parties in the country, along with the small Vivant, Belgian Union, Workers' Party of Belgium, and Left Socialist Party.

In the Brussels regional parliament elections on 7 June 2009, the party gained 1.7% of the Francophone votes and 2.7% of the Dutch-speakers' votes. The party got no seats. The party ran on two lists, adding the letters 'F' and 'N' on the French and Dutch lists, respectively. The two lists consisted of 72 Francophone and 17 Dutch-speaking candidates, respectively.
