= Maurice Bodson =

Belgian politician (1944–2020)

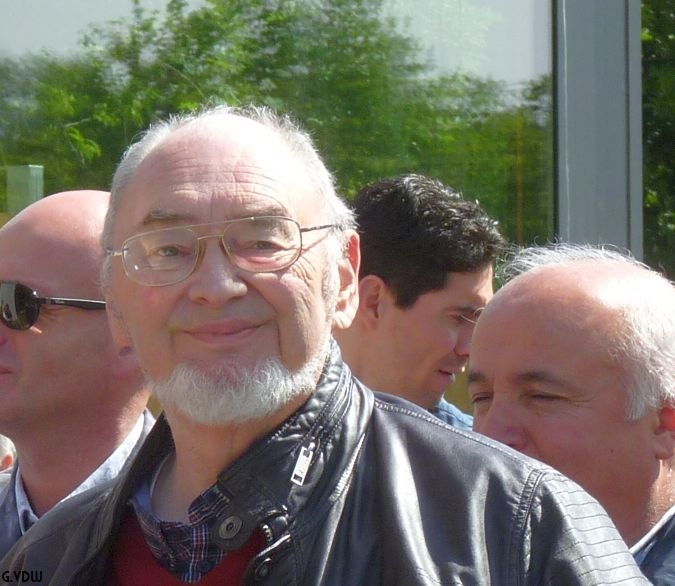
- Bodson in 2017

Communal Councillor of Strépy-Bracquegnies
- In office 1970–1976

Communal Councillor of La Louvière
- In office 1976–2020

Member of the Parliament of Wallonia
- In office 1995–2009

Personal details
- Born: 8 October 1944 Strépy-Bracquegnies, Belgium
- Died: 24 October 2020 (aged 76) La Louvière, Belgium
- Party: PS

Maurice Bodson (8 October 1944 – 24 October 2020) was a Belgian politician and a member of the Socialist Party.

== Biography ==
Bodson graduated from the Écoles normale de Mons and Morlanwelz. He became a member of the Jeunes Gardes socialistes de Bracquegnies in 1959 before becoming Vice-President of the Confédération des Jeunes Socialistes. He was also Vice-President of the Intercommunale du Gaz in Hainaut Province. He was President of the Syndicat d'Initiative de la Région du Centre and President of the Centre dramatique de Wallonie pour l'Enfance et la Jeunesse.

Bodson served as a Communal Councillor in his hometown of Strépy-Bracquegnies from 1970 to 1976 before moving to La Louvière, serving the same position there. He was also a member of the Parliament of Wallonia from 1995 to 2009.

Maurice Bodson died on 24 October 2020 at the age of 76.
