= Paul Furlan =

Belgian Walloon politician (1962–2023)

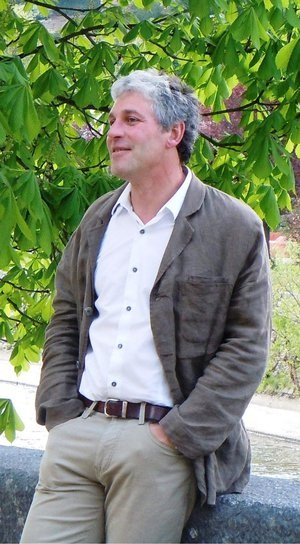

Paul Furlan (3 November 1962 – 10 April 2023) was a Belgian Walloon politician who served as Minister of Local Government and City Policy (including Tourism) in the Walloon Government for the Parti Socialiste. Furlan had a degree in public administration obtained at the University of Liège.

Furlan was born in Binche on 3 November 1962.

In 1999 Furlan was elected for the Walloon Parliament and in 2000 he was mayor of Thuin.

In January 2017, he had to resign as Minister of Local Government and City Policy because of the Publifin scandal.

Furlan died of cancer on 10 April 2023, at the age of 60.
