= Robert J. Houben =

Belgian politician

Robert J. Houben (5 May 1905 – 11 April 1992) was a Belgian politician and a member of the Christian Social Party.
