= New Belgian Front =

Belgian political party

New Belgian Front (FNB, French: Front Nouveau de Belgique, pronounced [fʁɔ̃ nuvo də bɛlʒik]) is a Belgian nationalist political party.

The FNB was founded in 1996 by Marguerite Bastien, a former member of the Liberal Reformist Party (Parti réformateur libéral) and a candidate for the National Front (Front National) in the 1995 elections, but she was expelled from that party somewhat later.

In 1999 Bastien was elected to the Brussels Parliament. She was expelled from the party though in 2001, and sat her term out as an independent.

Two other members of the party were elected to the Walloon Parliament in 2000. Currently the party is led by François-Xavier Robert.

== Platform ==
The platform of the FNB is nationalist, with anti-immigration and law and order themes.
