= Christlich Soziale Partei (Belgium) =

Christian Social Party Christlich Soziale Partei
- Abbreviation: CSP
- Leader: Jérôme Franssen
- Founded: 1971
- Headquarters: national secretariat Kaperberg 6, Eupen
- Ideology: Christian democracy
- Political position: Centre to centre-right
- Regional affiliation: Christian Group
- European Parliament group: European People's Party Group
- Francophone counterpart: Les Engagés
- Flemish counterpart: Christian Democratic and Flemish
- Colours: Orange
- Chamber of Representatives: 1 / 150
- Senate: 0 / 60
- Parliament of the German-speaking Community: 6 / 25
- European Parliament (German-speaking seat): 1 / 1
- Benelux Parliament (German-speaking seat): 1 / 1

Website
- csp-dg.be

The Christian Social Party (German: Christlich-Soziale Partei, pronounced [ˈkʁɪstlɪç zoˈtsi̯aːlə paʁˈtaɪ], CSP) is a Christian democratic political party operating in the German-speaking Community of Belgium. Its president is Luc Frank.

In the 1994 European Parliament election, standing as Christlich-Soziale Partei - Europäische Volkspartei, the party gained the single seat allocated by Belgian law to the German-speaking community. The party has maintained this seat since then. The CSP works with its Francophone counterpart Les Engagés in other elections.

== Election results ==
=== Parliament of the German-speaking Community ===
Election year	# of votes	% of votes	# of seats won	+/-	Notes
1990	13,178	33.6 (#1)	8 / 25		
1995	13,307	35.9 (#1)	10 / 25	▲2	
1999	12,822	34.8 (#1)	9 / 25	▼1	
2004	11,905	32.8 (#1)	8 / 25	▼1	
2009	10,122	27.0 (#1)	7 / 25	▼1	
2014	9,351	24.9 (#1)	7 / 25	0	
2019	9,069	23.1 (#2)	6 / 25	▼1	
2024	7,920	19.78	5 / 25	▼1	

=== European Parliament ===
Election	List leader	Votes	%		Seats	+/−	EP Group
Election	List leader	Votes	G.E.C.	Overall	Seats	+/−	EP Group
1994	Mathieu Grosch	11,999	31.29 (#1)	0.20	1 / 25	New	EPP
1999	Mathieu Grosch	13,456	36.47 (#1)	0.22	1 / 25	0	EPP
2004	Mathieu Grosch	15,722	42.29 (#1)	0.24	1 / 24	0	EPP
2009	Mathieu Grosch	12,475	32.25 (#1)	0.19	1 / 22	0	EPP
2014	Pascal Arimont	11,710	30.34 (#1)	0.18	1 / 21	0	EPP
2019	Pascal Arimont	14,247	34.94 (#1)	0.21	1 / 21	0	EPP
2024	Pascal Arimont	15,169	34.93 (#1)	0.21	1 / 22	0	EPP

== Members ==
- Robert J. Houben (1905–1992)

== Party logo ==
Logo before 2014. Orange is the traditional Christian democratic colour in Belgium.

Logo since 2014. Note the addition of the lion, symbolizing Belgium's German-speaking Community.
