= 2009 Belgian regional elections =

Regional elections were held in Belgium on 7 June 2009 to choose representatives in the regional parliaments of Flanders, Wallonia, Brussels and the German-speaking Community of Belgium. These elections were held on the same day as the European elections.

The Parliament of the French Community is composed of all elected members of the Walloon Parliament (except German-speakers) and the first 19 French-speaking members of the Brussels Parliament.

== Flemish Parliament ==
2009 Flemish parliamentary election
- 7 June 2009

All 124 seats in the Flemish Parliament 62 seats needed for a majority
Flemish Government before election
Peeters I Government
CD&V-sp.a-Open Vld-N-VA coalition
Flemish Government after election
Peeters II Government
CD&V-sp.a-N-VA coalition

All 124 members of the Flemish Parliament were elected. The five Flemish provinces (West Flanders, East Flanders, Antwerp, Flemish Brabant and Limburg) each are a constituency, plus the Brussels-Capital Region where those voting for a Dutch-language party could also vote in the Flemish election.

Party	Votes	%	Seats			
Party	Votes	%	Flanders	Brussels	Total	+/-
Christian Democratic and Flemish	939,873	22.86	31	1	31	-4
Flemish Interest	628,564	15.28	20	1	21	-11
Socialist Party Differently	627,852	15.27	18	1	19	-6
Open Flemish Liberals and Democrats	616,610	14.99	19	2	21	-4
New Flemish Alliance	537,040	13.06	16	–	16	+16
List Dedecker	313,176	7.62	8	–	8	+8
Groen!	278,211	6.77	6	1	7	+1
Union of Francophones	47,319	1.15	1	–	1	–
Social Liberal Party	44,734	1.09	–	–	–	–
Workers' Party of Belgium+	42,849	1.04	–	–	–	–
Left Socialist Party	10,038	0.24	–	–	–	–
Belgische Alliantie	9,318	0.23	–	–	–	–
Vrijheid	6,228	0.15	–	–	–	–
RESPECT	5,692	0.14	–	–	–	–
Committee for Another Policy	2,211	0.05	–	–	–	–
Vrije Christen Democraten	1,898	0.05	–	–	–	–
Belgische Unie – Union Belge	712	0.02	–	–	–	–
Total	4,112,325	100.00	119	6	124	0
Valid votes	4,112,325	94.50				
Invalid/blank votes	239,482	5.50				
Total votes	4,351,807	100.00				
Registered voters/turnout	4,676,488	93.06				
Source: Belgian Elections

=== Details ===
Region		Seats won per party								Total seats
	Provinces	CD&V	VB	OPEN VLD	SP.A	N-VA	LDD	GROEN!	UF	Total seats
Flanders	Antwerp	8 / 33	7 / 33	4 / 33	5 / 33	6 / 33	1 / 33	2 / 33	—N/a	33 / 124
Flanders	East Flanders	6 / 27	4 / 27	6 / 27	4 / 27	3 / 27	2 / 27	2 / 27	—N/a	27 / 124
Flanders	Flemish Brabant	4 / 20	3 / 20	4 / 20	3 / 20	3 / 20	1 / 20	1 / 20	1 / 20	20 / 124
Flanders	Limburg	5 / 16	3 / 16	2 / 16	3 / 16	2 / 16	1 / 16	—N/a	—N/a	16 / 124
Flanders	West Flanders	7 / 22	3 / 22	3 / 22	3 / 22	2 / 22	3 / 22	1 / 22	—N/a	22 / 124
Brussels		1 / 6	1 / 6	2 / 6	1 / 6	—N/a	—N/a	1 / 6	—N/a	6 / 124
Total		31 / 124	21 / 124	21 / 124	19 / 124	16 / 124	8 / 124	7 / 124	1 / 124	124 / 124

== Walloon Parliament ==
2009 Walloon parliamentary election
- 7 June 2009

All 75 seats in the Walloon Parliament 38 seats needed for a majority
Walloon Government before election
Demotte I Government
PS-cdH
Walloon Government after election
Demotte II Government
PS-Ecolo-cdH

Party	Votes	%	Seats	+/–
Socialist Party	657,803	32.77	29	-4
Reformist Movement	469,792	23.41	19	-2
Ecolo	372,067	18.54	14	+11
Humanist Democratic Centre	323,952	16.14	13	-1
National Front	57,374	2.86	–	-4
Rassemblement Wallonie France	27,955	1.39	–	–
Workers' Party of Belgium+	24,875	1.24	–	–
Wallonie D'Abord	19,255	0.96	–	–
FN Plus	13,116	0.65	–	–
Wallons	10,008	0.50	–	–
MS	6,470	0.32	–	–
PC - GE	6,431	0.32	–	–
LiDé	4,763	0.24	–	–
Parti Pensionnés	3,939	0.20	–	–
CAP DORAZIO	2,115	0.11	–	–
Belgique Positif	1,511	0.08	–	–
PSL	1,508	0.08	–	–
CDF	1,342	0.07	–	–
OSER	717	0.04	–	–
Velorution	429	0.02	–	–
GPS	399	0.02	–	–
ACNV	379	0.02	–	–
F.D.W.	311	0.02	–	–
Ripost	279	0.01	–	–
Républicain Wallon	248	0.01	–	–
Total	2,007,038	100.00	75	–
Valid votes	2,007,038	92.32		
Invalid/blank votes	166,863	7.68		
Total votes	2,173,901	100.00		
Registered voters/turnout	2,442,697	89.00		
Source: Belgian Elections

== Brussels Regional Parliament ==
2009 Brussels parliamentary election
- 7 June 2009

All 89 seats in the Brussels Parliament 45 seats needed for a majority
Brussels Government before election
Picqué III Government
PS-sp.a-cdH-CD&V-Open Vld-Ecolo coalition
Brussels Government after election
Picqué IV Government
PS-Ecolo-Groen-cdH-CD&V-Open Vld coalition

All 89 members of the Parliament of the Brussels-Capital Region were elected. Those voting for a Dutch-language party could also cast a vote for the Flemish parliamentary election.

Party	Votes	%	Seats
French language group
Reformist Movement	121,905	29.82	24
Socialist Party	107,303	26.24	21
Ecolo	82,663	20.22	16
Humanist Democratic Centre	60,527	14.80	11
National Front	7,803	1.91	–
Pro Bruxsel	6,840	1.67	–
Egalité	4,289	1.05	–
musulmans.be	4,055	0.99	–
Workers' Party+	3,427	0.84	–
PC-PSL-LCR-PH	2,042	0.50	–
CDF	1,807	0.44	–
Vélorution!	1,402	0.34	–
Rassemblement Wallonie France	1,321	0.32	–
FDB	588	0.14	–
New Belgian Front	557	0.14	–
CAP D'Orazio	521	0.13	–
Unie	491	0.12	–
Nation	471	0.12	–
Trefle	416	0.10	–
D.P.	299	0.07	–
P.S.H	143	0.03	–
Total	408,870	100.00	72
Dutch language group
Open Flemish Liberals and Democrats	11,957	23.07	4
Socialist Party Differently	10,085	19.46	4
Flemish Interest	9,072	17.51	3
Christian Democratic and Flemish	7,696	14.85	3
Green!	5,806	11.20	2
New Flemish Alliance	2,586	4.99	1
List Dedecker	1,957	3.78	–
Pro Bruxsel	1,225	2.36	–
Workers' Party+	611	1.18	–
Belgische Unie – Union Belge	462	0.89	–
Social Liberal Party	361	0.70	–
Total	51,818	100.00	17
Valid votes	460,688	95.04	
Invalid/blank votes	24,031	4.96	
Total votes	484,719	100.00	
Registered voters/turnout	574,793	84.33	
Source: Belgian Elections

== Parliament of the German-speaking Community ==
All 25 members of the Parliament of the German-speaking Community were elected.

Party	Votes	%	+/–	Seats	+/–
Christian Social Party	10,122	27.02	−5.77%	7	−1
Socialist Party	7,231	19.30	+0.29%	5	–
Party for Freedom and Progress	6,562	17.52	−3.46%	4	−1
ProDG	6,553	17.49	+5.80%	4	+1
Ecolo	4,310	11.50	+3.32%	3	+1
Vivant	2,684	7.16	−0.18%	2	–
Total	37,462	100.00	–	25	–
Valid votes	37,462	88.61			
Invalid/blank votes	4,817	11.39			
Total votes	42,279	100.00			
Registered voters/turnout	47,446	89.11			
Source: Belgian Elections
