= Humanist Democratic Centre =

French-speaking political party in Belgium

Humanist Democratic Centre; Christian Social Party; Centre Démocrate Humaniste; Parti Social Chrétien
- Abbreviation: CDH; PSC
- Founded: 1968
- Registered: 1972
- Dissolved: 17 March 2022
- Preceded by: Christian Social Party
- Succeeded by: Les Engagés
- Headquarters: National secretariat Rue des Deux Églises, Brussels
- Ideology: Christian democracy; Christian humanism; Pro-Europeanism; Factions: Conservatism; Christian left
- Political position: Centre to centre-right
- Regional affiliation: Christian Group
- European affiliation: European People's Party
- European Parliament group: European People's Party Group
- International affiliation: Centrist Democrat International
- Flemish counterpart: Christian Democratic and Flemish (CD&V)
- German-speaking counterpart: Christian Social Party
- Colours: Orange

Website
- lecdh.be (archived)

Humanist Democratic Centre (French: Centre Démocrate Humaniste, CDH) was a Christian democratic and centrist French-speaking political party in Belgium. The party originated in the split in 1972 of the unitary Christian Social Party (PSC-CVP) which had been the country's governing party for much of the post-war period. It continued to be called the Christian Social Party (French: Parti Social Chrétien, PSC) until 2002 when it was renamed the Humanist Democratic Centre. It was refounded as Les Engagés in 2022.

== History ==
The PSC was officially founded in 1972. The foundation was the result of the split of the unitary Christian Social Party (PSC-CVP) into the Dutch-speaking Christian People's Party (CVP) and the French-speaking Christian Social Party (PSC), following the increased linguistic tensions after the crisis at the Catholic University of Leuven in 1968. A similar split already happened in 1936 when the Catholic Bloc split into the dutchophone Catholic Flemish People's Party and francophone Catholic Social Party. The PSC performed particularly badly in the 1999 general election. This was linked to several scandals, such as the escape of Marc Dutroux and the discovery of dioxins in chickens (the PSC was a coalition partner in the Dehaene government). The decline in votes was also explained by declining adherence to Catholicism. The party was confined to opposition on all levels of government.

The party started a process of internal reform. In 2001 a new charter of principles, the "Charter of Democratic Humanism," was adopted and in 2002 the party adopted a new constitution and a new name, Humanist Democratic Centre.

In the 2003 general election the party did not perform much better and was still confined to opposition. After the 2004 regional elections the party returned to power in Brussels, in Walloon Region and the French Community together with the Socialist Party and Ecolo in Brussels, and with the Socialist Party in Walloon Region and the French Community.

In the 2007 general elections, the party won 10 out of 150 seats in the Chamber of Representatives and two out of 40 seats in the Senate.

In the 2010 general elections, the party lost one seat in the Chamber and kept its two seats in the Senate, a result which was repeated in the 2014 general elections. In the 2019 general elections the party registered its worst ever performance, winning only 5 seats and 3.7% of the vote, as well as its worst performance in the Walloon and Brussels parliaments as part of the general trend of Belgians turning away from the traditional political parties.

== Ideology ==
Its ideology was "democratic humanism, inspired by personalism inherited notably from Christian humanism" which includes a centre-left policy towards the economy, supporting state interventionism and calling for the unity of Belgium, while also containing a centre-right faction on social issues and supporting tougher measures on crime. Presently, the party considers itself to be a movement rather than a party, and calls for citizen-led initiatives and more engagement between the public and politicians.

== Presidents ==
CVP/PSC

- 1945–1947 August De Schryver
- 1949–1950 François-Xavier van der Straten-Waillet
- 1950–1961 Théo Lefèvre
- 1961–1966 Paul Vanden Boeynants
- 1966–1972 Robert J. Houben

PSC

- 1972–1976 Charles-Ferdinand Nothomb
- 1976–1977 Georges Gramme
- 1977–1979 Charles-Ferdinand Nothomb
- 1979–1981 Paul Vanden Boeynants
- 1981–1996 Gérard Deprez
- 1996–1998 Charles-Ferdinand Nothomb
- 1998–1999 Philippe Maystadt
- 1999–2002 Joëlle Milquet

cdH

- 2002–2011 Joëlle Milquet
- 2011–2019 Benoît Lutgen
- 2019–2022 Maxime Prévot

Until 1968 this lists gives the president of the Walloon part of the unitary CVP/PSC. The party changed its name from PSC to cdH on 18 May 2002.

== Electoral results ==
=== Chamber of Representatives ===
Results for the Chamber of Representatives, in percentages for the Kingdom of Belgium.

Election	Votes	%	Seats	±	Government
1971	327,393	6.2	15 / 212		Coalition
1974	478,209	9.1	22 / 212	▲7	Coalition
1977	545,055	9.8	24 / 212	▲2	Coalition
1978	560,440	10.1	25 / 212	▲1	Coalition
1981	390,896	6.5	18 / 212	▼7	Coalition
1985	482,254	7.9	20 / 212	▲2	Coalition
1987	491,908	8.0	19 / 212	▼1	Coalition
1991	476,730	7.7	18 / 212	▼1	Coalition
1995	469,101	7.7	12 / 150	▼6	Coalition
1999	365,318	5.9	10 / 150	▼2	Opposition
2003	359,660	5.5	8 / 150	▼2	Opposition
2007	404,077	6.0	10 / 150	▲2	Coalition
2010	360,441	5.5	9 / 150	▼1	Coalition
2014	336,281	5.0	9 / 150	Steady	Opposition
2019	250,861	3.7	5 / 150	▼4	External support (2020)
2019	250,861	3.7	5 / 150	▼4	Opposition (2020–)

=== Senate ===
Election	Votes	%	Seats	±
1971 (Note: In coalition with Christian People's Party.)	1,547,853	29.7	22 / 106	
1974	430,512	10.0	10 / 106	▼
1977	522,613	9.5	11 / 106	▲1
1978	535,939	9.8	12 / 106	▲1
1981	414,733	6.9	8 / 106	▼4
1985	475,119	7.9	10 / 106	▲2
1987	474,370	7.8	8 / 106	▼2
1991	483,961	7.9	9 / 106	▲1
1995	434,492	7.3	3 / 40	▼6
1999	374,002	6.0	3 / 40	0
2003	362,705	5.5	2 / 40	▼1
2007	390,852	5.9	2 / 40	0
2010	331,870	5.1	2 / 40	0

=== Regional ===
==== Brussels Parliament ====
Election	Votes	%		Seats	±	Government
Election	Votes	F.E.C.	Overall	Seats	±	Government
1989	51,904		11.9 (#4)	9 / 75		Coalition
1995	38,244		9.3 (#3)	7 / 75	▼2	Opposition
1999	33,815	14.1 (#4)	7.9 (#4)	6 / 75	▼1	Opposition
2004	55,078	14.1 (#3)	12.1 (#3)	10 / 89	▲4	Coalition
2009	60,527	14.8 (#4)	13.1 (#4)	11 / 89	▲1	Coalition
2014	48,021	11.7 (#4)	10.4 (#4)	9 / 89	▼2	Coalition
2019	29,436	7.6 (#6)	6.4 (#6)	6 / 89	▼3	Opposition

==== Walloon Parliament ====
Election	Votes	%	Seats	±	Government
1995	407,741	21.6 (#3)	16 / 75		Coalition
1999	325,229	17.1 (#3)	14 / 75	▼2	Opposition
2004	347,348	17.6 (#3)	14 / 75	0	Coalition
2009	323,952	16.1 (#4)	13 / 75	▼1	Coalition
2014	305,281	15.2 (#3)	13 / 75	0	Coalition
2019	223,775	11.0 (#4)	10 / 75	▼3	Opposition

=== European Parliament ===
Election	Votes	%		Seats	±
Election	Votes	F.E.C.	Overall	Seats	±
1979	445,912	21.2 (#2)	8.2	3 / 24	
1984	436,108	19.5 (#3)		2 / 24	▼1
1989	476,795	21.3 (#3)	8.1	2 / 24	0
1994	420,198	18.8 (#3)	4.9	2 / 25	0
1999	307,912	13.3 (#4)	4.9	1 / 25	▼1
2004	368,753	15.2 (#3)	5.7	1 / 24	0
2009	327,824	13.3 (#4)	5.0	1 / 22	0
2014	276,879	11.4 (#4)	4.1	1 / 21	0
2019	218,078	8.9 (#5)	3.2	1 / 21	0
