= 2004 Belgian regional elections =

Regional council elections held in Belgium

On 13 June 2004, regional elections were held in Belgium, to choose representatives in the regional councils of the Flemish Parliament, the Walloon Parliament, the Brussels Parliament and the German-speaking Community of Belgium. The elections were held on the same day as the European elections.

== Flemish Parliament ==
2004 Flemish parliamentary election
- 13 June 2004

All 124 seats in the Flemish Parliament 62 seats needed for a majority
Flemish Government before election
Somers Government
Open Vld-sp.a-Groen-Spirit
Flemish Government after election
Leterme Government
CD&V/N-VA-sp.a-Open Vld coalition

Party	Votes	%	Seats			
Party	Votes	%	Flanders	Brussels	Total	+/-
Christian Democratic and Flemish-New Flemish Alliance	1,060,580	26.09	34	1	35	+5
Flemish Block	981,587	24.15	29	3	32	+10
Flemish Liberals and Democrats-Vivant	804,578	19.79	24	1	25	-2
Socialist Party Differently-Spirit	799,325	19.66	24	1	25	+6
Groen!	308,898	7.60	6	–	6	-6
Union of Francophones	43,391	1.07	1	–	1	–
Workers' Party of Belgium+	22,874	0.56	–	–	–	–
Belgische Unie – Union Belge	9,535	0.23	–	–	–	–
National Front	7,388	0.18	–	–	–	–
Solide	6,033	0.15	–	–	–	–
Respect	5,227	0.13	–	–	–	–
MDP	4,187	0.10	–	–	–	–
PvdD	2,640	0.06	–	–	–	–
Left Socialist Party	2,509	0.06	–	–	–	–
STA OP	1,821	0.04	–	–	–	–
B.U.B.	1,723	0.04	–	–	–	–
Vrijheid, Intimiteit, Thuis, Arbeid en Liefde	1,332	0.03	–	–	–	–
MRV	761	0.02	–	–	–	–
VDB	357	0.01	–	–	–	–
Total	4,064,746	100.00	118	6	124	13
Valid votes	4,064,746	94.87				
Invalid/blank votes	219,910	5.13				
Total votes	4,284,656	100.00				
Registered voters/turnout	4,568,250	93.79				
Source: Belgian Elections

In the Flemish Parliament election, the liberal-socialist government was put to the test. The far right Vlaams Blok became the second largest party in Flanders just after the alliance of conservatives Christian Democratic and Flemish-New Flemish Alliance (CD&V - N-VA). The green party Groen! managed to be elected and keeps half of their seats in the parliament. In contrast with the previous election, the People's Union (VU-ID) has split and the new parties, N-VA and Spirit, allied with CD&V and Different Socialist Party (SP.A) respectively.

Because of the cordon sanitaire of all the other parties against Vlaams Blok, a coalition of at least three parties needed to be formed in order to have a majority in the Flemish Parliament. Groen! confirmed that it did not want to take part in the new coalition, so the only coalition left was a conservative-socialist-liberal tripartite.

In the aftermath of the elections, Yves Leterme (CD&V) was selected to form a Flemish regional government.

=== Details ===
Region		Seats won per party						Total seats
	Provinces	CD&V + N-VA	VB	VLD + VIVANT	SP.A + SPIRIT	GROEN!	UF	Total seats
Flanders	Antwerp	9 / 33	10 / 33	6 / 33	6 / 33	2 / 33	—N/a	33 / 124
Flanders	East Flanders	7 / 27	6 / 27	7 / 27	5 / 27	2 / 27	—N/a	27 / 124
Flanders	Flemish Brabant	5 / 20	5 / 20	4 / 20	4 / 20	1 / 20	1 / 20	20 / 124
Flanders	Limburg	5 / 16	4 / 16	3 / 16	4 / 16	—N/a	—N/a	16 / 124
Flanders	West Flanders	8 / 22	4 / 22	4 / 22	5 / 22	1 / 22	—N/a	22 / 124
Brussels		1 / 6	3 / 6	1 / 6	1 / 6	—N/a	—N/a	6 / 124
Total		35 / 124	32 / 124	25 / 124	25 / 124	6 / 124	1 / 124	124 / 124

== Walloon Regional Parliament ==
2004 Walloon parliamentary election
- 13 June 2004

All 75 seats in the Walloon Parliament 38 seats needed for a majority
Walloon Government before election
Van Cauwenberghe I Government
PS-Ecolo-MR coalition
Walloon Government after election
Van Cauwenberghe II Government
PS-cdH coalition

Party	Votes	%	Seats	+/–
Socialist Party	727,781	36.91	33	+8
Reformist Movement	478,999	24.29	21	–
Humanist Democratic Centre	347,348	17.62	14	–
Ecolo	167,916	8.52	3	-11
National Front	160,130	8.12	4	+3
Rassemblement Wallonie France	20,019	1.02	–	–
Vivant	16,281	0.83	–	–
CDF	12,881	0.65	–	–
Workers' Party of Belgium+	12,216	0.62	–	–
New Belgian Front	10,566	0.54	–	–
Wallon	5,091	0.26	–	–
Parteilos Jugendliche Unabhängige-PDB	3,183	0.16	–	–
France	2,780	0.14	–	–
MS-CW	2,458	0.12	–	–
Bloc National	1,536	0.08	–	–
Belgische Unie – Union Belge	753	0.04	–	–
Isagoria	583	0.03	–	–
La Ligue	520	0.03	–	–
Q.i.	502	0.03	–	–
PH	162	0.01	–	–
Total	1,971,705	100.00	75	–
Valid votes	1,971,705	93.36		
Invalid/blank votes	140,167	6.64		
Total votes	2,111,872	100.00		
Registered voters/turnout	2,359,447	89.51		
Source: Belgian Elections

In the aftermath of the elections, Elio Di Rupo (PS) was selected to form a Walloon regional government.

== Brussels Regional Parliament ==
2004 Brussels parliamentary election
- 13 June 2004

All 89 seats in the Brussels Parliament 45 seats needed for a majority
Brussels Government before election
Simonet II Government
MR-Open Vld-PS-sp.a-CD&V coalition
Brussels Government after election
Picqué III Government
PS-sp.a/Spirit-cdH-CD&V-Open Vld-Ecolo coalition

In the aftermath of the elections, Charles Picqué (PS) was selected to form a Brussels regional government.

Party	Votes	%	Seats
French language group
Socialist Party	130,462	33.35	26
Reformist Movement	127,122	32.49	25
Humanist Democratic Centre	55,078	14.08	10
Ecolo	37,908	9.69	7
National Front	21,195	5.42	4
PJM	4,214	1.08	–
CDF	3,886	0.99	–
PCP	3,281	0.84	–
New Belgian Front	2,656	0.68	–
PTB+PVDA+	2,221	0.57	–
Rassemblement Wallonie France	1,575	0.40	–
Ludocratie	678	0.17	–
Belgische Unie – Union Belge-NB	640	0.16	–
PH	300	0.08	–
Total	391,216	100.00	72
Dutch language group
Flemish Block	21,297	34.07	6
Flemish Liberals and Democrats-Vivant	12,443	19.90	4
Socialist Party Differently-Spirit	11,052	17.68	3
Christian Democratic and Flemish-New Flemish Alliance	10,482	16.77	3
Green!	6,132	9.81	1
Belgische Unie – Union Belge	511	0.82	–
VDB	313	0.50	–
FIRE	286	0.46	–
Total	62,516	100.00	17
Valid votes	453,732	96.23	
Invalid/blank votes	17,796	3.77	
Total votes	471,528	100.00	
Registered voters/turnout	564,182	83.58	
Source: Belgian Elections

== Parliament of the German-speaking Community ==
Party	Votes	%	+/–	Seats	+/–
Christian Social Party	11,905	32.79	−2.0%	8	-1
Party for Freedom and Progress-Reformist Movement	7,615	20.98	−0.3%	5	-1
Socialist Party	6,903	19.01	+4.0%	5	+1
Parteilos Jugendliche Unabhängige-PDB	4,243	11.69	−1.2%	3	–
Ecolo	2,972	8.19	−4.5%	2	-1
Vivant	2,665	7.34	+4.0%	2	+2
Total	36,303	100.00	–	25	–
Valid votes	36,303	88.77			
Invalid/blank votes	4,594	11.23			
Total votes	40,897	100.00			
Registered voters/turnout	45,975	88.95			
Source: Belgian Elections
