= 1999 Belgian regional elections =

Regional elections were held in Belgium, to choose representatives in the regional councils of Flanders, Wallonia, Brussels and the German-speaking Community on 13 June 1999. The regional elections were held on the same day as the European elections and the federal elections.

== Flemish Parliament ==
1999 Flemish parliamentary election
- 13 June 1999

All 124 seats in the Flemish Parliament 62 seats needed for a majority
Flemish Government before election
Van Den Brande IV Government
CVP-SP coalition
Flemish Government after election
Dewael Government
VLD-SP-Agalev-People's Union coalition

The incumbent Flemish Government consisted of the Christian People's Party (CVP) and the Socialist Party (SP), led by Minister-President Luc Van den Brande (CVP). Following this election, a government was formed without the Christian democrats. New Minister-President Patrick Dewael (Flemish Liberals and Democrats (VLD)) led a "purple-green-yellow" coalition of his own liberal VLD, the Socialist Party, Agalev and the nationalist People's Union (VU-ID). This change mirrored what happened on the federal level, where the Jean-Luc Dehaene Government was succeeded by the Guy Verhofstadt Government.

Also notable was the continuation of the rise of Vlaams Blok, especially in the constituency of Antwerp where Filip Dewinter was candidate and where the party received 25% of the votes, or as much as 30% in the city of Antwerp itself.

Party	Votes	%	Seats			
Party	Votes	%	Flanders	Brussels	Total	+/-
Christian People's Party	857,732	22.09	28	2	30	-7
Flemish Liberals and Democrats	855,867	22.04	27	–	27	–
Flemish Block	603,345	15.54	20	2	22	+5
Flemish Socialist Party	582,419	15.00	19	1	20	-6
Agalev	451,361	11.62	12	–	12	+5
People's Union	359,226	9.25	11	1	12	+3
Vivant	77,864	2.01	–	–	–	–
Union of Francophones	36,683	0.94	1	–	1	–
PVDA-AE	24,162	0.62	–	–	–	–
PNPB	12,489	0.32	–	–	–	–
W.O.W.	8,043	0.21	–	–	–	–
UDDU	4,150	0.11	–	–	–	–
Solide	2,464	0.06	–	–	–	–
A	2,331	0.06	–	–	–	–
W.I.T.	1,659	0.04	–	–	–	–
LEEF	1,621	0.04	–	–	–	–
V.N.P.	727	0.02	–	–	–	–
Vrijheid, Intimiteit, Thuis, Arbeid en Liefde	563	0.01	–	–	–	–
MLINKS	478	0.01	–	–	–	–
Total	3,883,184	100.00	118	6	124	0
Valid votes	3,883,184	94.21				
Invalid/blank votes	238,749	5.79				
Total votes	4,121,933	100.00				
Registered voters/turnout	4,471,695	92.18				
Source: Belgian Elections

=== By constituency ===
These were only the second direct election for the Flemish Parliament, but the last to use arrondissement-based constituencies. They were merged into provincial constituencies starting from the 2004 election.

Constituency \ Party	CVP	VLD	VB	SP	Agalev	VU-ID	UF	Total
Antwerp	3	4	6	2	3	1	–	19
Hasselt-Tongeren-Maaseik	4	3	2	4	1	1	–	15
Mechelen-Turnhout	4	3	2	2	1	2	–	14
Ghent-Eeklo	3	3	2	1	2	1	–	12
Halle-Vilvoorde	2	3	2	1	1	1	1	11
Kortrijk-Roeselare-Tielt	3	2	1	2	1	1	–	10
Leuven	2	2	1	2	1	1	0	9
Sint-Niklaas-Dendermonde	2	2	1	1	1	1	–	8
Aalst-Oudenaarde	1	2	2	2	0	1	–	8
Veurne-Diksmuide-Ypres	2	2	1	1	0	1	–	7
Bruges	2	1	0	1	1	0	–	5
Total (Flemish Region only)	28	27	20	19	12	11	1	118
Brussels-Capital	2	0	2	1	0	1	–	6
Total (Flemish Community)	30	27	22	20	12	12	1	124

== Walloon Regional Parliament ==
1999 Walloon parliamentary election
- 13 June 1999

All 75 seats in the Walloon Parliament 38 seats needed for a majority
Walloon Government before election
Collignon II Government
PS-cdH coalition
Walloon Government after election
Di Rupo I Government (Wallonia)
PS-PRL-Ecolo coalition

Party	Votes	%	Seats	+/–
Socialist Party	560,867	29.44	25	-5
Liberal Reformist Party-Democratic Front of Francophones	470,454	24.69	21	+2
Ecolo	347,225	18.22	14	+6
Christian Social Party	325,229	17.07	14	-2
National Front	75,262	3.95	1	-1
Vivant	46,099	2.42	–	–
Communist Party	19,178	1.01	–	–
New Belgian Front	14,969	0.79	–	–
Wallon	11,550	0.61	–	–
PTB-UA	9,408	0.49	–	–
PNPB	8,205	0.43	–	–
France	6,638	0.35	–	–
Parteilos Jugendliche Unabhängige-PDB	3,894	0.20	–	–
A	1,346	0.07	–	–
CTV	755	0.04	–	–
PMTJ	675	0.04	–	–
FN-FW	654	0.03	–	–
-	563	0.03	–	–
FNBP	532	0.03	–	–
UDDU	458	0.02	–	–
Parti Communautaire National-Européen	403	0.02	–	–
PSD	339	0.02	–	–
LC	315	0.02	–	–
REF	221	0.01	–	–
Total	1,905,239	100.00	75	–
Valid votes	1,905,239	91.62		
Invalid/blank votes	174,322	8.38		
Total votes	2,079,561	100.00		
Registered voters/turnout	2,301,411	90.36		
Source: Belgian Elections

== Brussels Regional Parliament ==
1999 Brussels parliamentary election
- 13 June 1999

All 89 seats in the Brussels Parliament 45 seats needed for a majority
Brussels Government before election
Picqué II Government
PRL-PS-CVP-FDF-sp.a-People's Union coalition
Brussels Government after election
Simonet I Government
PS-PRL-Ecolo coalition

Party	Votes	%	Seats	+/–
Liberal Reformist Party-Democratic Front of Francophones	146,845	34.41	27	-1
Ecolo	77,969	18.27	14	+7
Socialist Party	68,307	16.01	13	-4
Christian Social Party	33,815	7.92	6	-1
Flemish Block	19,310	4.52	4	+2
Christian People's Party	14,284	3.35	3	–
Flemish Liberals and Democrats-People's Union-O	13,729	3.22	2	-1
Flemish Socialist Party-Agalev	13,223	3.10	2	–
National Front	11,204	2.63	2	-4
Vivant	6,431	1.51	1	+1
New Belgian Front	5,528	1.30	1	+1
D.MARET	3,430	0.80	–	–
PC	3,346	0.78	–	–
PTB-UA	1,760	0.41	–	–
TARTE	1,612	0.38	–	–
ZUT	788	0.18	–	–
PNPB*	722	0.17	–	–
A	701	0.16	–	–
BLOC WL	681	0.16	–	–
PSD	644	0.15	–	–
MARS	546	0.13	–	–
ICB	439	0.10	–	–
La G.P.	412	0.10	–	–
DD	312	0.07	–	–
UDDU	278	0.07	–	–
PH	254	0.06	–	–
PMTJ	171	0.04	–	–
Total	426,741	100.00	75	–
Valid votes	426,741	95.08		
Invalid/blank votes	22,098	4.92		
Total votes	448,839	100.00		
Registered voters/turnout	544,044	82.50		
Source: Belgian Elections

== Council of the German-speaking Community ==
Party	Votes	%	+/–	Seats	+/–
Christian Social Party	12,822	34.78	−1.15%	9	-1
Party for Freedom and Progress	7,860	21.32	+1.43%	6	+1
Socialist Party	5,519	14.97	−1.12%	4	–
Parteilos Jugendliche Unabhängige-PDB	4,739	12.86	−0.78%	3	–
Ecolo	4,694	12.73	−1.12%	3	–
Vivant	1,228	3.33	+3.33%	–	–
Total	36,862	100.00	–	25	–
Valid votes	36,862	90.68			
Invalid/blank votes	3,787	9.32			
Total votes	40,649	100.00			
Registered voters/turnout	45,649	89.05			
Source: Belgian Elections
