= 1995 Belgian regional elections =

On May 21, 1995, regional elections were held in Belgium, to choose representatives in the regional councils of Flanders, Wallonia, Brussels and the German-speaking Community of Belgium. It also was the first time elections were held for the Flemish and the Walloon Council. The regional elections were held on the same day as the federal election.

== Flemish Parliament ==
1995 Flemish parliamentary election
- 21 May 1995

All 124 seats in the Flemish Parliament 62 seats needed for a majority

Following this first direct election of the Flemish Parliament, the Christian democrats (CVP) and the Socialist Party (SP) formed a Flemish Government led by Minister-President Luc Van den Brande (CVP).

Party	Votes	%	Seats		
Party	Votes	%	Flanders	Brussels	Total
Christian People's Party	1,010,505	26.78	35	2	37
Flemish Liberals and Democrats	761,262	20.18	26	1	27
Flemish Socialist Party	733,703	19.45	25	1	26
Flemish Block	465,239	12.33	15	2	17
People's Union	338,173	8.96	9	–	9
Agalev	267,155	7.08	7	–	7
Union of Francophones	44,053	1.17	1	–	1
BANAAN	33,701	0.89	–	–	–
WOW	29,297	0.78	–	–	–
W.O.W.	23,329	0.62	–	–	–
PVDA-AE	21,785	0.58	–	–	–
HOERA	15,249	0.40	–	–	–
VVP	7,362	0.20	–	–	–
B.E.B.	5,279	0.14	–	–	–
N.W.P.	5,071	0.13	–	–	–
Unie	4,596	0.12	–	–	–
W.I.T.	1,617	0.04	–	–	–
D	1,362	0.04	–	–	–
A.O.V.	1,182	0.03	–	–	–
PSP	986	0.03	–	–	–
BEBEL	832	0.02	–	–	–
RVM	608	0.02	–	–	–
VNP	545	0.01	–	–	–
Vrijheid, Intimiteit, Thuis, Arbeid en Liefde	308	0.01	–	–	–
Total	3,773,199	100.00	118	6	124
Valid votes	3,773,199	92.89			
Invalid/blank votes	288,666	7.11			
Total votes	4,061,865	100.00			
Registered voters/turnout	4,392,481	92.47			
Source: Belgian Elections

=== By constituency ===
Constituency \ Party	CVP	VLD	SP	VB	VU	Agalev	UF	Total
Antwerp	4	4	4	4	1	2	–	19
Hasselt-Tongeren-Maaseik	5	3	4	1	1	1	–	15
Mechelen-Turnhout	5	2	2	3	1	1	–	14
Ghent-Eeklo	4	3	2	1	1	1	–	12
Halle-Vilvoorde	3	3	1	1	1	1	1	11
Kortrijk-Roeselare-Tielt	4	2	2	1	1	0	–	10
Leuven	2	2	3	1	1	0	0	9
Sint-Niklaas-Dendermonde	2	2	1	1	1	1	–	8
Aalst-Oudenaarde	2	2	3	1	0	0	–	8
Veurne-Diksmuide-Ypres	2	2	2	1	0	0	–	7
Bruges	2	1	1	0	1	0	–	5
Total (Flemish Region only)	35	26	25	15	9	7	1	118
Brussels-Capital	2	1	1	2	0	0	–	6
Total (Flemish Community)	37	27	26	17	9	7	1	124

== Walloon Regional Parliament ==
Party	Votes	%	Seats
Socialist Party	665,986	35.31	30
Liberal Reformist Party-Democratic Front of Francophones	447,542	23.73	19
Christian Social Party	407,741	21.62	16
Ecolo	196,988	10.44	8
National Front	96,574	5.12	2
Agir	16,507	0.88	–
PTB-UA	12,726	0.67	–
PC	6,336	0.34	–
Wallon	6,195	0.33	–
Unie	6,002	0.32	–
P.D.B.	5,271	0.28	–
Emploi	2,564	0.14	–
France	2,492	0.13	–
B.E.B	2,135	0.11	–
SUD-BEB	1,979	0.10	–
Parti Communautaire National-Européen	1,820	0.10	–
U.D.F.	1,558	0.08	–
Blanc	1,272	0.07	–
R	1,180	0.06	–
ADM	1,007	0.05	–
Ligue	707	0.04	–
LETD	649	0.03	–
U.C.D.	405	0.02	–
REF	397	0.02	–
I.N.	220	0.01	–
Total	1,886,253	100.00	75
Valid votes	1,886,253	92.05	
Invalid/blank votes	162,900	7.95	
Total votes	2,049,153	100.00	
Registered voters/turnout	2,269,135	90.31	
Source: Belgian Elections

== Brussels Regional Parliament ==
Party	Votes	%	Seats	+/–
Liberal Reformist Party-Democratic Front of Francophones	144,478	34.98	28	+1
Socialist Party	88,370	21.40	17	-1
Christian Social Party	38,244	9.26	7	-2
Ecolo	37,308	9.03	7	-1
National Front	30,803	7.46	6	+4
Christian People's Party	13,586	3.29	3	-1
Flemish Block	12,507	3.03	2	+1
Flemish Liberals and Democrats	11,034	2.67	2	–
Flemish Socialist Party	9,987	2.42	2	–
People's Union	5,726	1.39	1	–
RALBOL	3,976	0.96	–	–
Agalev	3,906	0.95	–	-1
BANAAN	2,536	0.61	–	–
GU	2,312	0.56	–	–
PTB-UA	2,052	0.50	–	–
UNIE	1,827	0.44	–	–
RLB	1,611	0.39	–	–
PLUS	1,015	0.25	–	–
PLN	529	0.13	–	–
A.R.	423	0.10	–	–
PFH/PFU	256	0.06	–	–
Parti Communautaire National-Européen	254	0.06	–	–
LETD	237	0.06	–	–
Total	412,977	100.00	75	–
Valid votes	412,977	92.80		
Invalid/blank votes	32,051	7.20		
Total votes	445,028	100.00		
Registered voters/turnout	537,394	82.81		
Source: Belgian Elections

== Council of the German-speaking Community ==
Party	Votes	%	+/–	Seats	+/–
Christian Social Party	13,307	35.93	+2.33%	10	+2
Party for Freedom and Progress	7,367	19.89	+0.11%	5	0
Socialist Party	5,958	16.09	−0.25%	4	0
Ecolo	5,128	13.85	−1.19%	3	-1
Parteilos Jugendliche Unabhängige	5,051	13.64	−1.61%	3	-1
Workers' Party of Belgium	226	0.61	+0.61%	–	0
Total	37,037	100.00	–	25	–
Valid votes	37,037	90.70			
Invalid/blank votes	3,797	9.30			
Total votes	40,834	100.00			
Registered voters/turnout	45,073	90.60			
Source: Belgian Elections
