= Parliament of Wallonia =

Legislative body of the Belgian region

Coordinates: 50°27′50.31″N 4°52′24.64″E

(in official languages)
German	Parlament von Wallonien
French	Parlement de Wallonie
Walloon	Pårlumint di Walonreye

Type
- Type: Unicameral

Leadership
- President: Willy Borsus, MR since 25 June 2024

Structure
- Seats: 75
- Political groups: Government (43): MR (26); LE (17); Opposition (32): PS (19); PTB (8); Ecolo (5)
- Length of term: 5 years

Elections
- Last election: 9 June 2024
- Next election: 2029

Meeting place
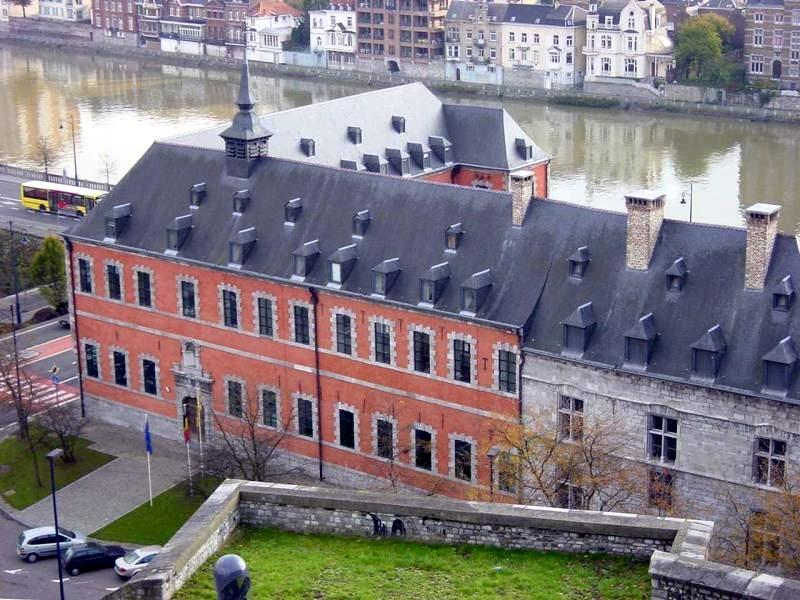
- Saint-Gilles Hospice, Namur

Website
- https://www.parlement-wallonie.be/

The Parliament of Wallonia (French: Parlement de Wallonie, pronounced [paʁləmɑ̃ də walɔni]), or the Walloon Parliament (Parlement wallon, [paʁləmɑ̃ walɔ̃]) in the decrees, is the legislative body of Wallonia, one of the three self-governing regions of Belgium (the other two being Flanders and the Brussels-Capital Region). The parliament building, the former Hospice Saint-Gilles, is situated in Namur, the capital of Wallonia, at the symbolic confluence of the Meuse and the Sambre, the two main rivers of the most inhabited parts of Wallonia, the Sillon industriel. On the other side of the Meuse, facing the Parliament, is the Élysette, the seat of the Government of Wallonia.

== History and names ==
A 1974 law on the temporary creation of regions installed a Walloon Regional Council (alongside a Flemish Regional Council), which were both abolished in 1977. At the creation of the first (permanent) regional assemblies in 1980 (second state reform), the body was also called "Walloon Regional Council" (Conseil régional wallon). Its members were the national representatives and senators elected in the Walloon Region, who thus by law held two offices simultaneously.

The fourth state reform (1993), transformed Belgium into a federal state and changed the "Walloon Regional Council" (Conseil régional wallon) into the "Council of the Walloon Region" (Conseil de la Région wallonne), which was directly elected for the first time on 21 May 1995. Shortly before these elections, in April 1995, the Council adopted a resolution to use the terms "Walloon Parliament" (Parlement wallon) and "Walloon deputies" (députés wallons).

A 2005 constitutional amendment revised the official terminology for all community and regional councils into community and regional parliaments, changing the "Council of the Walloon Region" into the "Walloon Parliament" (Parlement wallon).

In 2015, the Parliament opted to use the term "Parliament of Wallonia" (Parlement de Wallonie) instead of "Walloon Parliament".

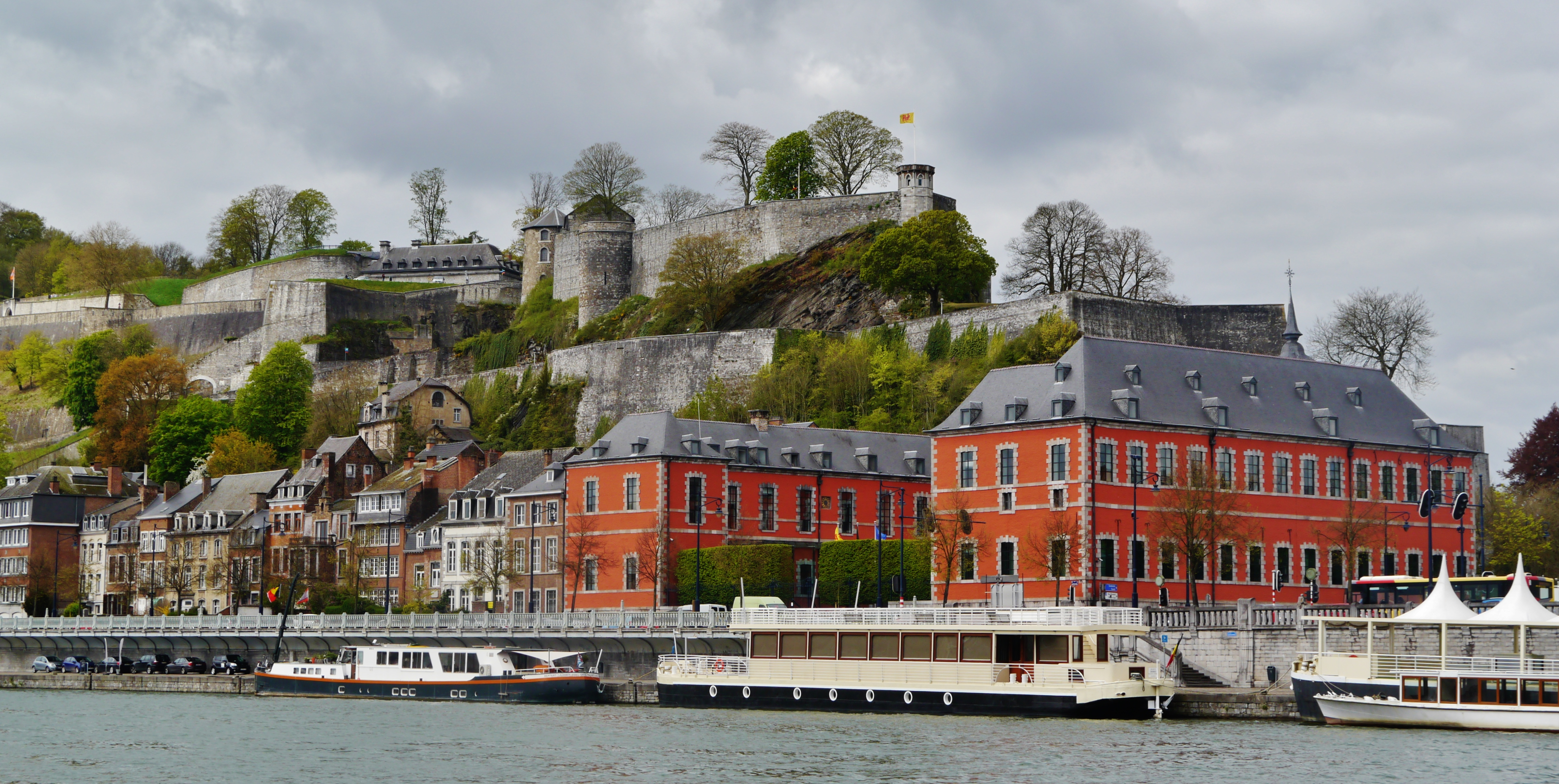
Saint-Gilles Hospice from the Meuse, beneath the Namur Citadel

== Composition ==
All members of the Parliament of Wallonia are also members of the Parliament of the French Community, except for German-speaking members, who represent the German-speaking population and are advisory members of the Parliament of the German-speaking Community.

The parliament exercises several functions:

- It discusses and passes decrees, and they can take initiatives to draw them up. After this, decrees are sanctioned and promulgated by the Walloon Government.
- It controls the Walloon Government. Control is exercised via the vote.
- It ratifies the international treaties linked to its powers.

== Compositions ==
=== 2024–2029 (current) ===
Affiliation	Members
Mouvement Réformateur ("Reformist Movement")	26
Parti Socialiste ("Socialist Party")	19
Les Engagés ("The Committed Ones")	17
Parti du Travail de Belgique ("Workers' Party of Belgium")	8
Ecolo ("Environmentalist")	5
Total	75

=== 2019–2024 ===
Affiliation	Members
Parti Socialiste ("Socialist Party")	23
Mouvement Réformateur ("Reformist Movement")	20
Ecolo ("Environmentalist")	12
Parti du Travail de Belgique ("Workers' Party of Belgium")	10
Centre démocrate humaniste ("Humanist Democratic Centre")	10
Total	75

=== 2014–2019 ===
This is the composition of the Walloon Parliament following the 2014 regional election.

Affiliation	Members
Parti Socialiste ("Socialist Party")	30
Mouvement Réformateur ("Reformist Movement")	25
Centre démocrate humaniste ("Humanist Democratic Centre")	13
Ecolo ("Environmentalist")	4
Parti du Travail de Belgique ("Workers' Party of Belgium")	2
Parti populaire ("People's Party")	1
Total	75

=== 2009–2014 ===
This is the composition of the Walloon Parliament following the 2009 regional election. The PS, Ecolo and CDH formed together a government.

Seat division of the Parliament after the elections of 2009

Affiliation	Members
Parti Socialiste ("Socialist Party")	29
Mouvement Réformateur ("Reformist Movement")	19
Ecolo ("Environmentalist")	14
Centre démocrate humaniste ("Humanist Democratic Centre")	13
Total	75

=== 2004–2009 ===
This was the composition of the Walloon Parliament following the 2004 regional election. The PS and CDH formed together a government.

Seat division of the Parliament after the elections of 2004

Affiliation	Members
Parti Socialiste ("Socialist Party")	34
Mouvement Réformateur ("Reformist Movement")	20
Centre démocrate humaniste ("Humanist Democratic Centre")	14
Front National ("National Front")	4
Ecolo ("Environmentalist")	3
Total	75

=== 1999–2004 ===
This was the composition of the Walloon Parliament following the 1999 regional election. The PS, Ecolo and PRL formed together a government.

Seat division of the Parliament after the elections of 1999

Affiliation	Members
Parti Socialiste ("Socialist Party")	25
Parti Réformateur Libéral ("Reformist Movement") with Front Démocratique des Francophones ("Democratic Front of the Francophones")	21
Ecolo ("Environmentalist")	14
Parti Social Chrétien ("Christian Socialist Party")	14
Front National ("National Front")	1
Total	75

1995–1999

8	30	16	19	2
Ecolo	PS	PSC	PRL + FDF	FN

1999–2004

14	25	14	21	1
Ecolo	PS	PSC	PRL + FDF	FN

2004–2009

3	34	14	20	4
Ecolo	PS	CDH	MR	FN

2009–2014

14	29	13	19
Ecolo	PS	CDH	MR

2014–2019

2	4	30	13	25	1
PTB–GO!	Ecolo	PS	CDH	MR	PP

2019–2024

10	12	23	10	20
PTB	Ecolo	PS	CDH	MR

2024–present

8	5	19	17	26
PTB	Ecolo	PS	LE	MR

== Constituencies ==
The Walloon Parliament is the only Belgian parliament which still uses arrondissement-based constituencies. The federal Chamber of Representatives and the Flemish Parliament both merged theirs into larger province-based constituencies.

A January 2018 law merged both Luxembourg constituencies and reformed the Hainaut constituencies (* = boundaries changed), following a successful challenge by Ecolo to the Constitutional Court that constituencies with too few seats are unrepresentative.

Province	Constituency	1995 & 1999	2004 & 2009	2014	2019
Liège	Liège	14	13		
Liège	Verviers	6			
Liège	Huy-Waremme	4			
Hainaut	Charleroi	10	9		10 *
Hainaut	Thuin	3			10 *
Hainaut	Tournai-Ath-Mouscron	7			7 *
Hainaut	Mons	6		5	5 *
Hainaut	Soignies	4			5 *
Walloon Brabant	Nivelles	7	8		
Namur	Namur	6		7	
Namur	Dinant-Philippeville	3	4		
Luxembourg	Arlon-Marche-Bastogne	3			6
Luxembourg	Neufchâteau-Virton	2			6

== See also ==
- Government of Wallonia
- Minister-President of Wallonia
- Flemish Parliament
- Parliament of the Brussels-Capital Region
- Parliament of the French Community
- Parliament of the German-speaking Community
