= List of members of the Parliament of the German-speaking Community, 2024–2029 =

Parliament of the German-speaking Community (2024-2029)

Overview
- Term: July 1, 2024 – 2029
- Election: June 9, 2024

This is the composition of the Parliament of the German-speaking Community for the legislative period 2024-2029.

The Parliament of the German-speaking Community has 25 directly elected members. In addition, there are also members with an advisory vote: they may attend meetings, but may not participate in votes or take initiatives. This is an indefinite number and can therefore vary per legislature. These members with an advisory vote are the German-speaking provincial councillors of the province of Liège and German-speaking members of the Chamber of Representatives, the Parliament of Wallonia and the European Parliament.

This legislature follows the German-speaking Community elections of 9 June 2024 and started on 1 July 2024. The opening session was chaired by Freddy Cremer (ProDG), the oldest member of parliament.

During this legislature, the Paasch III government is in office, supported by a majority of ProDG, CSP and PFF. The opposition parties are therefore Vivant, SP and Ecolo.

== Composition ==
Party	Seats
ProDG	8
CSP	5
Vivant	4
SP	3
PFF	3
Ecolo	2

== List of Members of Parliament ==
Name	Party	Notes
Elke Comoth	ProDG	
Freddy Cremer	ProDG	Secretary and chairman of the ProDG faction.
Kathy Elsen	ProDG	
Ewald Gangolf	ProDG	
Lisa Göbbels	ProDG	Replaces Oliver Paasch, Minister in the German-speaking Community Government, from 1 July 2024 .
José Grommes	ProDG	Secretary and Chairman of the Committee on Health, Social Affairs, Family and Housing.
Patrick Laschet	ProDG	Replaces Lydia Klinkenberg, Minister in the German-speaking Community Government, from 1 July 2024 .
Liesa Scholzen	ProDG	Vice-chairman and Chairman of the Committee on Education, Training and Employment.
Patricia Creutz-Vilvoye	CSP	Speaker of Parliament from 1 July 2024 and Chair of the Committee on General Policy and Cooperation, Finance, Local Government, Spatial Planning, Sustainable Development and Economic Development.
Marcel Henn	CSP	
Stephanie Pauels	CSP	Secretary and chairman of the CSP faction.
Etienne Simar	CSP	Replaces Jérôme Franssen, Minister in the German-speaking Community Government, from 1 July 2024.
Lukas Teller	CSP	Replaces, from 1 July 2024 Pascal Arimont, who chose to remain in the European Parliament.
Michael Balter	Vivant	Vice-chairman and Chairman of the Vivant faction.
Alain Mertes	Vivant	Chairman of the Committee on Culture, Adult Education, Tourism, Monument Care and Nature Conservation.
Elena Peters	Vivant	
Diana Stiel	Vivant	
Björn Klinkenberg	SP	
Mechtilde Neuens	SP	
Kirsten Neycken-Bartholemy	SP	Replaces Antonios Antoniadis from 1 July 2024, who decides not to sit. Neycken-Bartholemy is vice-chairman and chairman of the SP faction.
Evelyn Jadin	PFF	Vice-chairman and Chairman of the PFF faction.
Gerhard Löfgen	PFF	Replaces Gregor Freches, Minister in the German-speaking Community Government, from 1 July 2024 .
Ralph Schröder	PFF	
Fabienne Colling	Ecolo	Chairman of the Ecolo faction.
Andreas Jerusalem	Ecolo	

== Members with advisory vote ==
Names	Party	Notes
Pascal Arimont	CSP	Seated in the Europees Parlement.
Luc Frank	PFF	Seated in the Kamer van volksvertegenwoordigers.
Christine Mauel	PFF	Seated in the Waals Parlement.
Freddy Mockel	Ecolo	Seated in the Waals Parlement.
Patrick Spies	SP	Seated in the Waals Parlement.
