= List of members of the Parliament of the German-speaking Community, 2009–2014 =

This is a list of members of the Parliament of the German-speaking Community in Belgium during the 2009–2014 legislative session.

== Composition ==
Party	Seats	+/–
Christian Social Party (Christlich Soziale Partei, CSP)	7	▼1
Parti Socialiste (Sozialistische Partei, SP)	5	0
Party for Freedom and Progress (Partei für Freiheit und Fortschritt, PFF)	4	▼1
ProDG (Pro deutschsprachige Gemeinschaft, PRODG)	4	▲1
Ecolo (ECOLO)	3	▲1
Vivant (VIVANT)	2	0
	25	

== Leadership ==
The Bureau of the Parliament of the German-speaking Community consists of the following members:

Fraction	Name	Office
PFF	Alexander Miesen	President
CSP	Patricia Creutz-Vilvoye	Vice-President
SP	Charles Servaty	Vice-President
ProDG	Lydia Klinkenberg	Vice-President
Ecolo	Karl-Heinz Braun	Vice-President
SP	Resi Stoffels	Secretary
CSP	Pascal Arimont	Secretary

== Full members ==
The Parliament of the German-speaking Community consists of 25 full members that are directly elected by the inhabitants of the German-speaking Community for a term of office of 5 years. The last election was held in 2009 and the next one will take place in 2014.

One of the members is chosen to represent the Community in the federal Senate; the current Community senator is Louis Siquet (SP).

Fraction	Name
Ecolo	Roswitha Arens
CSP	Pascal Arimont
Independent (Vivant)	Michael Balter (politician)
Ecolo	Karl-Heinz Braun
CSP	René Chaineux
PFF	Bernard Collas
CSP	Patricia Creutz-Vilvoye
PFF	Emil Dannemark
PFF	Emil Dannemark
CSP	Luc Frank
Ecolo	Franziska Franzen
CSP	Herbert Grommes
SP	Erwin Klinkenberg
ProDG	Lydia Klinkenberg
PFF	Hans-Dieter Laschet
Independent (Vivant)	Alain Mertes
CSP	Patrick Meyer
ProDG	Gerhard Palm
SP	Nadine Rotheudt
ProDG	Petra Schmitz
SP	Charles Servaty
SP	Louis Siquet
SP	Resi Stoffels
CSP	Gabriele Thiemann-Heinen
ProDG	Alfons Velz

== Advisory members ==
In addition to the directly elected members above, the Parliament of the German-speaking Community also comprises a number of members with an advisory vote. These are not actual members of the Parliament, but they do have the right to attend and participate in its meetings.

The advisory members are the Provincial Councillors of Liège, the members of the Walloon Parliament, the members of the Chamber of Representatives and the members of the Senate who reside in the German-speaking area of Belgium and have taken the oath of office in German, as well as the Member of the European Parliament elected by the German-speaking electoral college.

Fraction	Name	Function
CSP	Denis Barth	Provincial Councillor in Liège
SP	Joseph Barth	Provincial Councillor in Liège
Ecolo	Marlene Bongartz-Kaut	Provincial Councillor in Liège
Ecolo	Monika Dethier-Neumann	Member of the Walloon Parliament
CSP	Mathieu Grosch	Member of the European Parliament
PFF	Kattrin Jadin	Federal Representative
PFF	Heinz Keul	Provincial Councillor in Liège
PFF	Balduin Lux	Provincial Councillor in Liège
CSP	Anne Marenne-Loiseau	Provincial Councillor in Liège
SP	Edmund Stoffels	Member of the Walloon Parliament

== Sources ==
- "Members of the DG Parliament" (in German). The Parliament of the German-speaking Community. Archived from the original on 2008-03-11.
- "Fractions" (in German). The Parliament of the German-speaking Community. Archived from the original on 2008-02-03.
