= 2014 Belgian regional elections =

Belgian elections

Regional elections were held in Belgium on 25 May 2014 to choose representatives for the Flemish Parliament, Walloon Parliament, Brussels Parliament and the Parliament of the German-speaking Community. These elections were held on the same day as the 2014 European elections as well as the 2014 Belgian federal election.

The Parliament of the French Community is composed of all elected members of the Walloon Parliament (except German-speaking members) and 19 of the French-speaking members of the Brussels Parliament.

== Flemish Parliament ==
2014 Flemish parliamentary election
- 25 May 2014

All 124 seats in the Flemish Parliament 63 seats needed for a majority
- Turnout: 92.67%
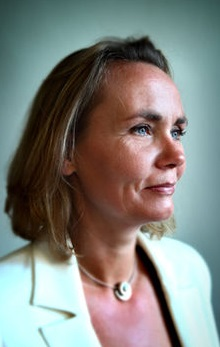

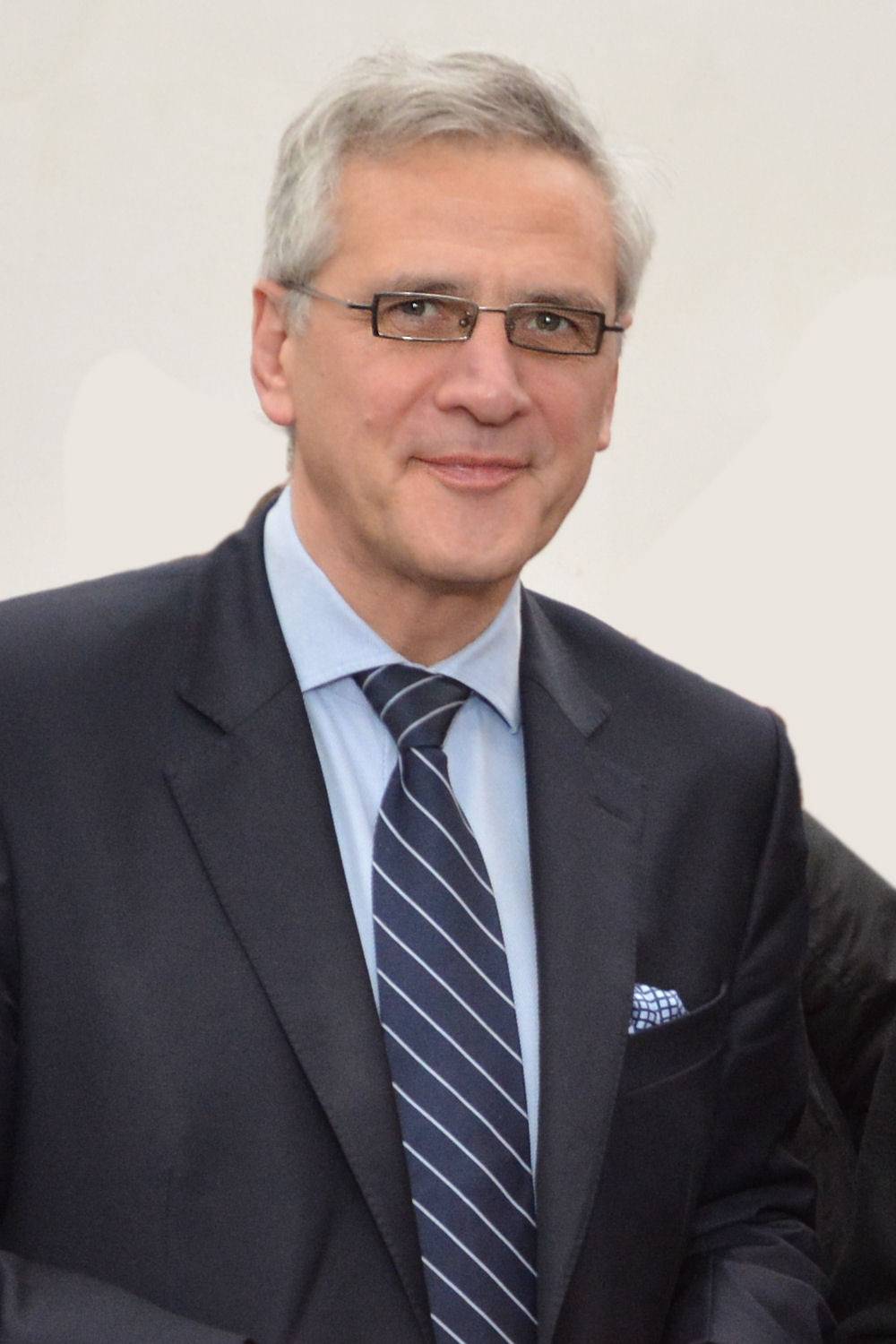

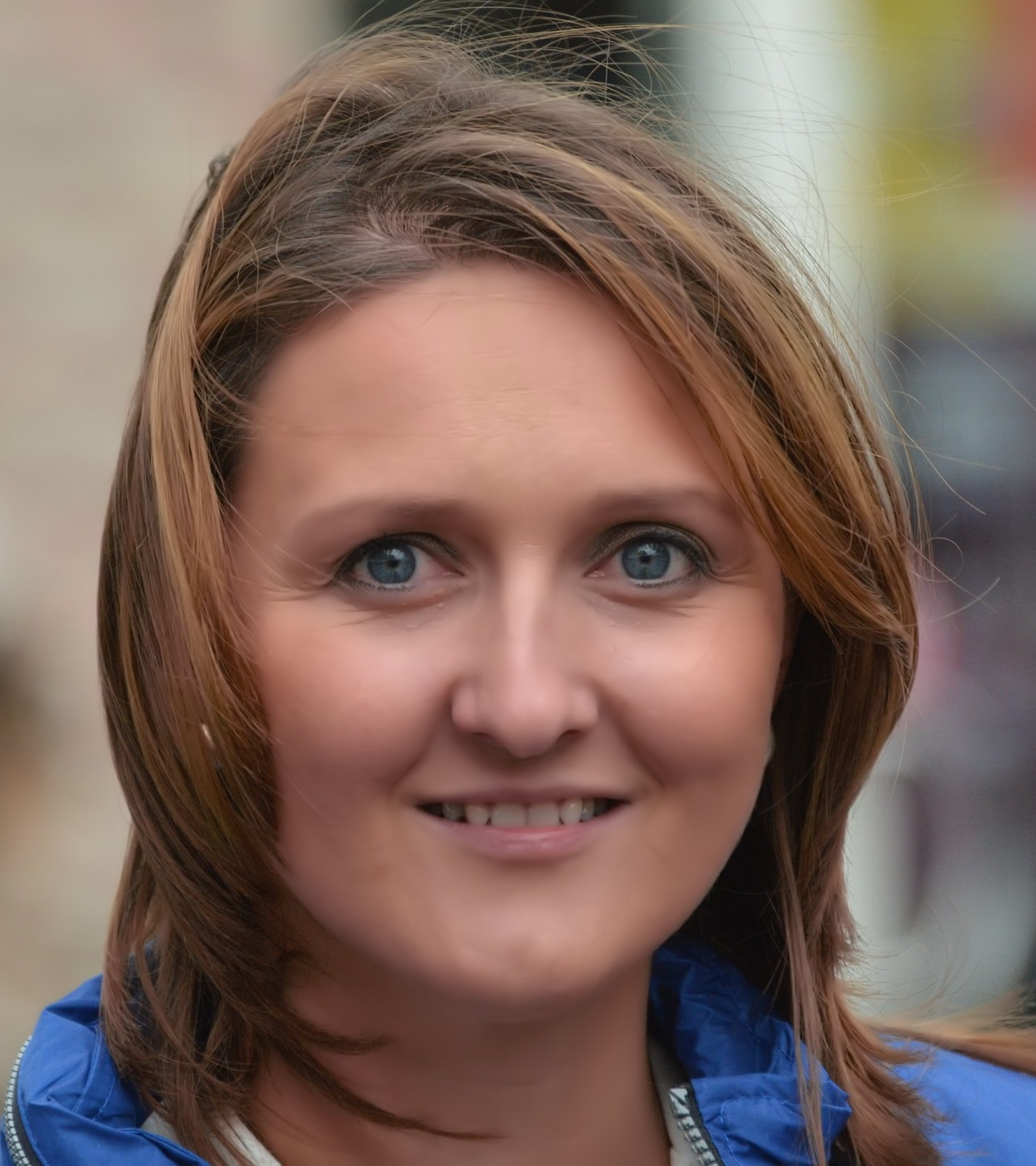

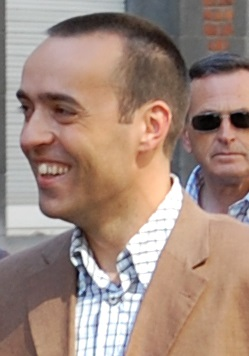

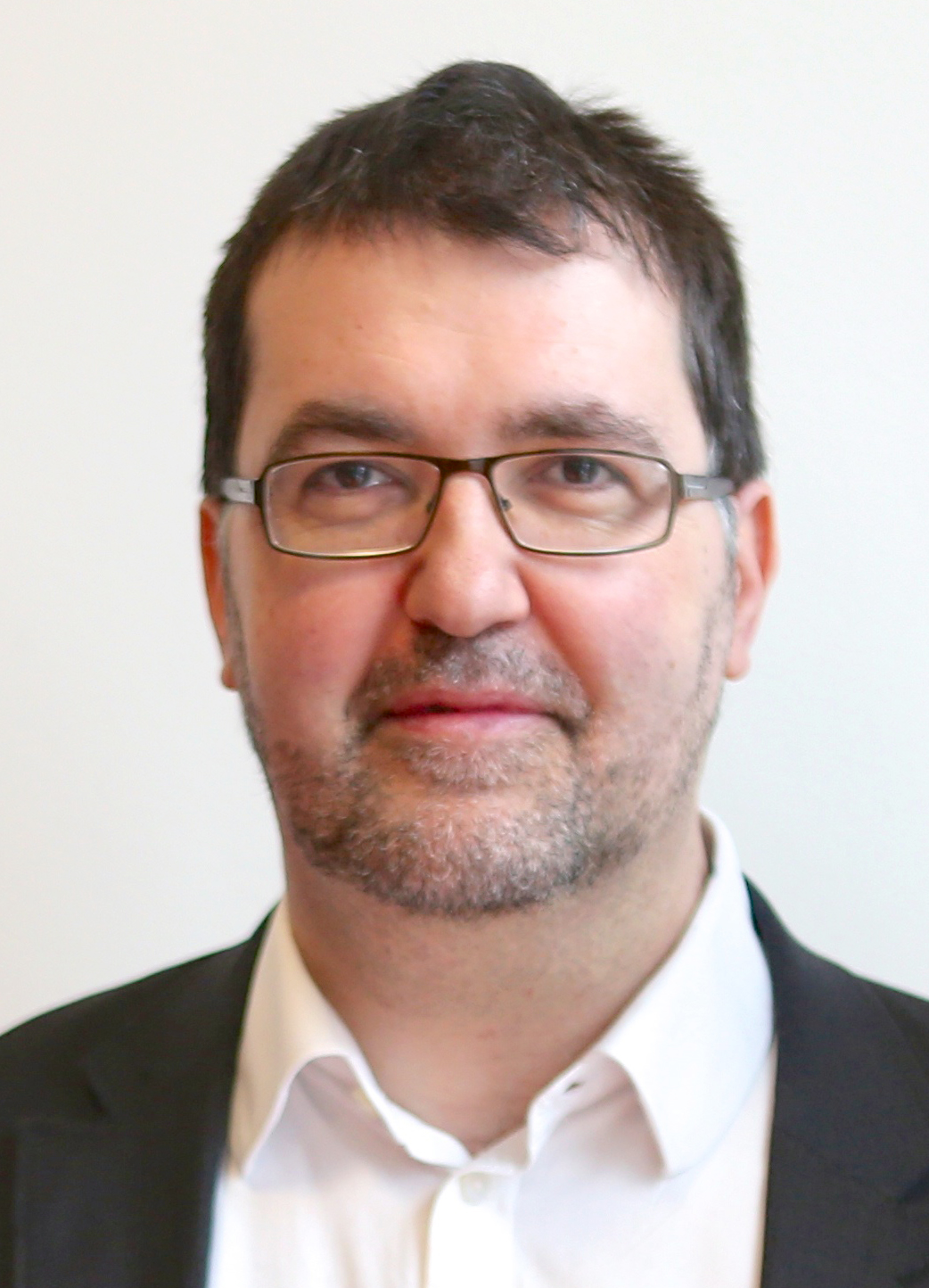
	First party	Second party	Third party
Leader	Liesbeth Homans	Kris Peeters	Gwendolyn Rutten
Party	N-VA	CD&V	Open Vld
Leader's seat	Antwerp	did not stand	did not stand
Last election	16 seats, 13.06%	31 seats, 22.86%	21 seats, 14.99%
Seats won	43	27	19
Seat change	▲27	▼4	▼2
Popular vote	1,339,946	860,694	594,469
Percentage	31.88%	20.48%	14.15%
Swing	▲18.83	▼2.37	▼0.85
	Fourth party	Fifth party	Sixth party
Leader	Bruno Tobback	Wouter Van Besien	Guy D'haeseleer
Party	sp.a	Groen	Flemish Interest
Leader's seat	Flemish Brabant	Antwerp	East Flanders
Last election	19 seats, 15.27%	7 seats, 6.77%	21 seats, 15.28%
Seats won	18	10	6
Seat change	▼1	▲3	▼15
Popular vote	587,903	365,781	248,840
Percentage	13.99%	8.7%	5.92%
Swing	▼1.28	▲1.94	▼9.36
Flemish Government before election
Peeters II Government
CD&V–sp.a–N-VA coalition
Elected Flemish Government
Bourgeois Government
N-VA–CD&V–Open Vld coalition

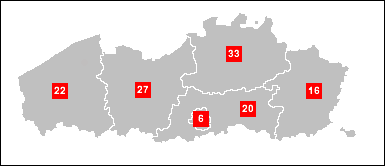
Number of seats per constituency in Flanders

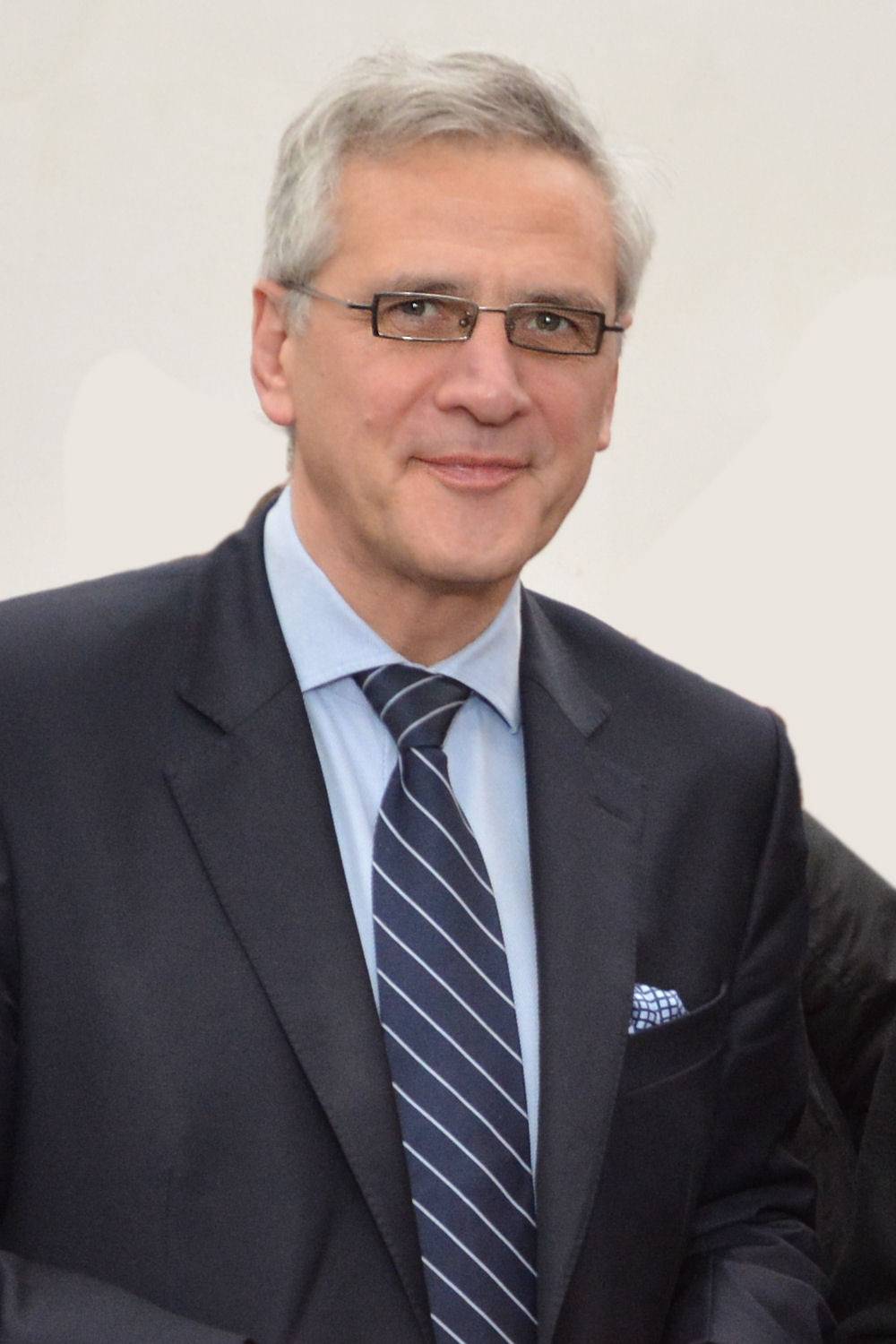
Incumbent Minister-President Kris Peeters (CD&V)

All 124 members of the Flemish Parliament were elected. The five Flemish Region provinces (West Flanders, East Flanders, Antwerp, Flemish Brabant and Limburg) each are a constituency, plus the Brussels-Capital Region where those voting for a Dutch-language party can also vote in the Flemish election.

The incumbent Peeters II Government was made up of a coalition of CD&V, N-VA and sp.a. Minister-President Kris Peeters (CD&V) consistently polled as one of the most popular politicians in Flanders. He is a candidate to succeed himself as Minister-President. Other parties did not put forward an explicit candidate to be Minister-President.

Since the elections coincide with the federal elections, a lot of the campaigning and debates have been about federal matters. Nonetheless, the sixth state reform has transferred a lot of powers from the federal state to the regional level, such as child benefits.

Other major election topics include the reform of the secondary education, and mobility around Antwerp, in particular the Oosterweel Link.

=== Opinion polls ===
Date	Polling Firm	CD&V	VB	sp.a	VLD	N-VA	Groen	PVDA	Others	Lead
25 May 2014	Flemish Elections	20.5	5.9	14.0	14.2	31.9	8.7	2.5	2.3	11.4
16 May	De Standaard	20.0	8.4	14.4	13.1	31.8	9.5	2.6	0.2	11.8
25 Apr	De Standaard	20.0	6.7	14.5	12.7	33.2	9.1	1.7	2.1	13.2
23 Apr	Le Soir	17.6	10.3	13.5	13.5	32.8	8.7	3.4	0.2	15.2
15 Apr	La Libre Belgique	16.9	9.9	13.6	13.5	32.9	7.6	4.1	1.5	16.0
21 Feb	La Libre Belgique	17.6	9.8	14.6	12.8	32.3	7.3	3.7	1.9	14.7
13 Feb	Le Soir	18.5	7.6	13.3	13.3	32.3	8.4	2.7	3.9	13.8
2014
24 Nov	La Libre Belgique	17.9	9.9	14.1	12.4	30.8	8.0	2.0	4.9	12.9
21 Nov	Le Soir	17.4	9.6	13.1	14.4	31.2	8.9	3.0	2.4	13.8
2 Sep	La Libre Belgique	17.3	11.3	12.0	11.8	35.5	6.9	1.5	3.7	18.2
16 Jun	Le Soir	15.7	9.4	13.9	13.2	35.0	7.7	-	5.1	19.3
25 May	La Libre Belgique	15.9	12.9	14.1	12.9	32.8	6.5	2.5	2.4	16.9
25 May	De Standaard	17.4	10.6	14.7	10.1	32.1	9.5	2.5	3.1	14.7
24 Mar	Le Soir	16.7	10.5	13.6	12.3	33.6	7.7	2.8	2.8	16.9
16 Mar	Het Laatste Nieuws	15.1	11.3	14.7	12.1	33.8	8.4	-	4.6	18.7
22 Feb	La Libre Belgique	14.1	6.8	14.9	10.0	39.0	8.7	2.4	4.1	24.1
2013
30 Nov	La Libre Belgique	16.5	10.7	14.4	9.6	35.4	8.0	3.6	1.8	18.9
14 Oct 2012	Provincial elections	21.4	8.9	13.6	14.6	28.5	8.3	2.1	2.5	7.1
14 Sep	De Standaard	18.5	9.5	14.5	10.7	36.3	7.9	-	2.6	17.8
5 Sep	La Libre Belgique	13.4	10.0	13.5	11.6	40.1	7.5	2.7	1.2	26.6
2012
2 Dec	La Libre Belgique	12.6	8.4	13.9	12.6	39.8	7.5	-	5.2	25.9
2011
10 Jun 2010	Federal Elections	17.6	12.6	15.0	14.0	28.2	7.1	1.3	4.1	10.6
2 Apr	De Standaard	22.2	14.0	15.9	17.6	14.8	8.1	-	7.4	4.6
2010
9 Oct	De Standaard	24.4	12.8	15.0	16.7	13.5	8.5	-	9.1	7.7
7 Jun 2009	Flemish Elections	22.9	15.3	15.3	15.0	13.1	6.8	1.0	10.7	7.6

=== Main candidates ===
National party	(Antwerp Province) Antwerp	East Flanders	Flemish Brabant	(Limburg (Belgium)) Limburg	West Flanders	Brussels
Major parties
Christian Democratic and Flemish (CD&V)	Kris Peeters	Joke Schauvliege	Peter Van Rompuy	Jo Vandeurzen	Hilde Crevits	Bianca Debaets
Green (Groen)	Wouter Van Besien	Elisabeth Meuleman	Hermes Sanctorum	Johan Danen	Bart Caron	Elke Van den Brandt
New Flemish Alliance (N-VA)	Liesbeth Homans	Matthias Diependaele	Ben Weyts	Jan Peumans	Geert Bourgeois	Karl Vanlouwe
Open Flemish Liberals and Democrats (Open Vld)	Bart Somers	Mathias De Clercq	Gwendolyn Rutten	Marino Keulen	Bart Tommelein	Ann Brusseel
Socialist Party–Differently (sp.a)	Caroline Gennez	Freya Van den Bossche	Bruno Tobback	Ingrid Lieten	John Crombez	Yamila Idrissi
Flemish Interest (Vlaams Belang)	Anke Van dermeersch	Guy D'haeseleer	Joris Van Hauthem	Chris Janssens	Stefaan Sintobin	Frédéric Erens
Minor parties
Workers' Party (PVDA+)	Jos D'Haese	Dirk Goemaere	Line De Witte	Gaby Colebunders	Bart Desmedt	—
Pirate Party	Kjell Segers	Sarah Van Liefferinge	David Knapen	—	Jonas Degrave	—

=== Results ===
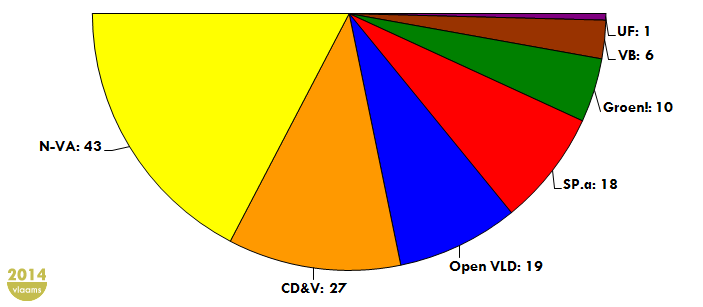

The winner is by far the N-VA, especially compared to the 2009 regional elections but also to the 2010 federal elections. Groen also gained votes, whereas CD&V, sp.a, Open Vld and especially Vlaams Belang lost votes. LDD did not compete and is no longer in parliament.

The Union of Francophones (UF) narrowly reached the 5% election threshold in Flemish Brabant, thereby keeping their only seat.

The incumbent government parties N-VA, CD&V and sp.a would have a large majority; it was however not expected that sp.a and N-VA will be together in a coalition.

Initially, N-VA and CD&V were negotiating to form a Flemish Government. However, since Open Vld was needed for a federal coalition and they wanted to be in both or neither governments, they joined the Flemish negotiations. On 25 July 2014, the new Bourgeois Government was sworn in, led by Minister-President Geert Bourgeois (N-VA). Outgoing Minister-President Kris Peeters (CD&V) became minister in the federal Michel Government.

Party	Votes	%	Seats			
Party	Votes	%	Flanders	Brussels	Total	+/-
New Flemish Alliance	1,339,943	31.88	42	1	43	▲27
Christian Democratic and Flemish	860,685	20.48	26	1	27	▼4
Open Flemish Liberals and Democrats	594,464	14.15	17	2	19	▼2
Socialist Party Differently	587,901	13.99	17	1	18	▼1
Green	365,779	8.70	9	1	10	▲3
Flemish Interest	248,840	5.92	6	0	6	▼15
Workers' Party of Belgium+	106,114	2.53	0	0	0	Steady
Union of Francophones	34,741	0.83	1	0	1	Steady
Pirate Party	25,986	0.62	0	0	0	Steady
Gezonde Evenwichtige Nieuwe Open Eerlijke Groepering	10,612	0.25	0	0	0	Steady
ROSSEM	9,937	0.24	0	0	0	Steady
Recht Op Een Leven	5,228	0.12	0	0	0	Steady
Vlaamse Christen Partij	5,026	0.12	0	0	0	Steady
Maakbare Maatschappij	3,227	0.08	0	0	0	Steady
Sociaal Democraten & Progressieven	2,853	0.07	0	0	0	Steady
Vrijheid, Intimiteit, Thuis, Arbeid en Liefde	617	0.01	0	0	0	Steady
Pensio(e)n Plus	482	0.01	0	0	0	Steady
Total	4,202,435	100.00	118	6	124	–
Valid votes	4,202,435	95.03				
Invalid/blank votes	219,601	4.97				
Total votes	4,422,036	100.00				
Registered voters/turnout	4,779,144	92.53				
Source: Belgian Elections

==== In detail ====
The candidate receiving the most preference votes was Liesbeth Homans (N-VA) in Antwerp, with 159,965 votes, ahead of Kris Peeters (CD&V).

The highest percentage of votes in a municipality (apart from the French-speaking list in the Brussels Periphery) was achieved by N-VA in Schilde (near Antwerp city) with 51,27% of the votes.

Party	Total			Antwerp			Brussels			East Flanders			Flemish Brabant			Limburg			West Flanders		
Party	Votes	Perc.	Seats	Votes	Perc.	Seats	Votes	Perc.	Seats	Votes	Perc.	Seats	Votes	Perc.	Seats	Votes	Perc.	Seats	Votes	Perc.	Seats
N-VA	1,339,943	31.88	43	411,001	36.46	14	9,508	18.31	1	300,638	30.65	9	204,139	29.43	7	176,512	32.15	5	238,148	29.78	7
CD&V	860,685	20.48	27	225,891	20.04	7	6,284	12.10	1	179,572	18.31	5	118,669	17.11	4	127,656	23.25	4	202,622	25.34	6
Open Vld	594,464	14.15	19	108,209	9.60	3	12,461	24.00	2	169,726	17.30	5	133,362	19.23	4	66,269	12.07	2	104,442	13.06	3
sp.a	587,901	13.99	18	128,760	11.42	4	9,558	18.41	1	139,640	14.24	4	85,105	12.27	2	94,721	17.25	3	130,119	16.27	4
Groen	365,779	8.70	10	111,234	9.87	3	10,660	20.53	1	88,977	9.07	2	64,836	9.35	2	32,713	5.96	1	57,361	7.17	1
Vlaams Belang	248,840	5.92	6	79,588	7.06	2	2,960	5.70	0	62,881	6.41	2	30,531	4.40	0	32,392	5.90	1	40,488	5.06	1
PVDA+	106,114	2.53	0	43,694	3.88	0	—N/a			23,029	2.35	0	12,212	1.76	0	14,257	2.60	0	12,922	1.62	0
UF	34,741	0.83	1	—N/a			—N/a			—N/a			34,471	5.01	1	—N/a			—N/a		
Piratenpartij	25,986	0.62	0	7,514	0.67	0	—N/a			7,142	0.73	0	5,572	0.80	0	—N/a			5,758	0.72	0
GENOEG	10,612	0.25	0	3,521	0.31	0	—N/a			2,177	0.22	0	1,398	0.20	0	1,475	0.27	0	1,449	0.18	0
R.O.S.S.E.M.	9,937	0.24	0	2,733	0.24	0	—N/a			2,236	0.23	0	1,302	0.19	0	1,259	0.23	0	2,407	0.30	0
ROEL	5,228	0.12	0	1,306	0.12	0	—N/a			1,017	0.10	0	674	0.10	0	872	0.16	0	1,359	0.17	0
VCP	5,026	0.12	0	682	0.06	0	—N/a			909	0.09	0	1,007	0.15	0	979	0.18	0	1,449	0,18	0
MAMA	3,227	0.08	0	3,227	0.29	0	—N/a			—N/a			—N/a			—N/a			—N/a		
SD&P	2,853	0.07	0	—N/a			—N/a			2,853	0.29	0	—N/a			—N/a			—N/a		
V.I.T.A.L.	617	0.01	0	—N/a			—N/a			—N/a			—N/a			—N/a			617	0.08	0
PENSIO(E)N PLUS	482	0.01	0	—N/a			482	0.93	0	—N/a			—N/a			—N/a			—N/a		
Total	4,202,435	100.00	124	1,127,360	100.00	33	51,919	100.00	6	980,797	100.00	27	693,548	100.00	20	549,105	100.00	16	799,733	100.00	22

Largest party per municipality (Brussels enlarged)

== Walloon Parliament ==
2014 Walloon parliamentary election
- 25 May 2014

All 75 seats in the Walloon Parliament 38 seats needed for a majority
- Turnout: 87.67%
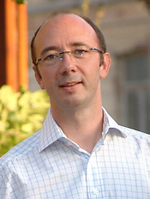

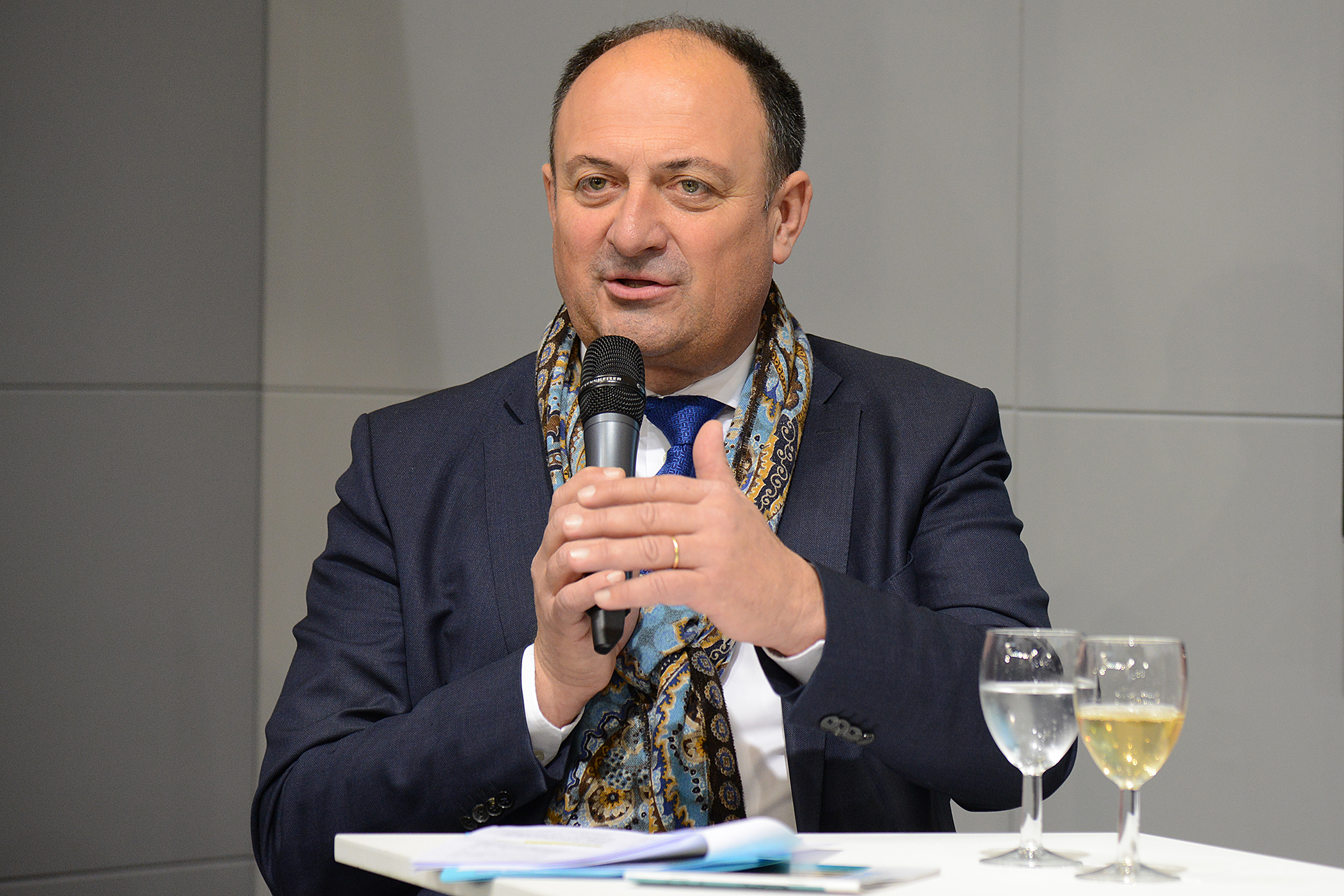

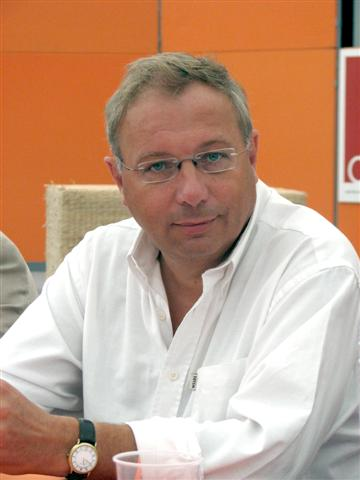
	First party	Second party	Third party
Leader	Rudy Demotte	Willy Borsus	André Antoine
Party	PS	MR	cdH
Leader's seat	did not stand	did not stand	Nivelles
Last election	29 seats, 32.77%	19 seats, 23.41%	13 seats, 16.14%
Seats won	30	25	13
Seat change	▲1	▲6	Steady
Popular vote	631,216	545,112	310,012
Percentage	30.90%	26.69%	15.18%
Swing	▼1.87	▲3.28	▼0.96
	Fourth party	Fifth party	Sixth party
Leader	Philippe Henry
Party	Ecolo	PVDA-PTB	PP
Leader's seat	Liège
Last election	14 seats, 18.54%	0 seats, 1.24%	New party
Seats won	4	2	1
Seat change	▼10	▲2	New party
Popular vote	176,026	117,500	99,237
Percentage	8.62%	5.75%	4.86%
Swing	▼9.92	▲4.51	New party
Walloon Government before election
Demotte II Government
PS–cdH–Ecolo coalition
Elected Walloon Government
Magnette Government
PS–cdH coalition

All 75 members of the Walloon Regional Parliament were elected. The elections took place in 13 electoral districts.

The incumbent Demotte II Government, led by Rudy Demotte, is a coalition of the Socialist Party (PS), the Humanist Democratic Centre (cdH) and Ecolo. The Reformist Movement (MR) was the only opposition party.

=== Opinion polls ===
Date	Polling Firm	PS	MR	Ecolo	cdH	PTB	PP	FDF	Others	Lead
25 May 2014	Walloon Elections	30.9	26.7	8.6	15.2	5.8	4.9	2.5	5.5	4.2
15 May	La Libre Belgique	28.7	21.8	9.4	11.6	8.5	5.8	3.1	11.1	6.9
23 Apr	Le Soir	28.9	23.3	10.9	13.7	9.2	7.0	2.5	4.5	5.6
15 Apr	La Libre Belgique	29.3	22.6	11.0	9.4	8.1	5.4	2.7	11.5	6.7
21 Feb	La Libre Belgique	28.0	24.1	10.6	10.2	7.6	5.9	2.3	11.3	3.9
13 Feb	Le Soir	28.4	23.3	11.4	12.5	6.7	5.6	2.0	10.1	5.1
2014
24 Nov	La Libre Belgique	30.3	22.1	11.2	12.7	4.1	4.0	3.3	12.3	8.1
21 Nov	Le Soir	29.3	21.7	11.2	14.0	4.1	2.8	2.2	14.7	7.6
2 Sep	La Libre Belgique	30.3	23.5	12.7	12.8	3.7	2.1	3.1	11.8	6.8
16 Jun	Le Soir	28.7	22.2	13.0	12.6	4.5	-	2.2	16.8	6.5
25 May	La Libre Belgique	28.6	24.0	14.7	12.9	4.6	1.4	2.8	11.0	4.6
22 Feb	La Libre Belgique	30.2	24.2	12.9	12.3	4.2	2.5	3.5	10.2	6.0
2013
30 Nov	La Libre Belgique	30.6	23.5	11.3	12.7	5.4	2.4	2.1	12.0	7.1
14 Oct 2012	Provincial elections	32.0	27.7	13.2	17.0	2.8	-	2.4	5.0	4.3
2012
2011
10 Jun 2010	Federal Elections	37.6	22.2	12.3	14.6	1.9	3.1	–	8.2	15.4
2010
7 Jun 2009	Walloon Elections	32.8	23.4	18.5	16.1	1.2	–	-	7.9	9.4

=== Results ===
PS, cdH, Ecolo lost votes, whereas MR gained votes and PTB-GO! as well as Parti Populaire are new parties in parliament.

Within two weeks following the elections, the Socialist Party and the Humanist Democratic Centre started negotiations for a new government.

Party	Votes	%	Seats	+/–
Socialist Party	632,653	30.90	30	▲1
Reformist Movement	546,363	26.69	25	▲6
Humanist Democratic Centre	310,495	15.17	13	Steady
Ecolo	176,486	8.62	4	▼10
Workers' Party of Belgium	117,882	5.76	2	▲2
People's Party	99,580	4.86	1	▲1
Francophone Democratic Federalists	51,830	2.53	0	Steady
La Droite	28,438	1.39	0	Steady
Debout Les Belges!	16,618	0.81	0	Steady
Nation	10,839	0.53	0	Steady
Rassemblement Wallonie France	9,731	0.48	0	Steady
Wallonie D'Abord	9,082	0.44	0	Steady
MG	4,958	0.24	0	Steady
PP Partipensionnes	4,811	0.23	0	Steady
Pirate Party	3,612	0.18	0	Steady
VEGA	3,501	0.17	0	Steady
RassemblementWalon	3,298	0.16	0	Steady
Islam	3,169	0.15	0	Steady
NWA	2,677	0.13	0	Steady
FW	2,619	0.13	0	Steady
P+	2,280	0.11	0	Steady
VLC	1,927	0.09	0	Steady
R	1,889	0.09	0	Steady
Rassemblement R	1,082	0.05	0	Steady
Atomique	892	0.04	0	Steady
Union des Liberaux	483	0.02	0	Steady
UdL	192	0.01	0	Steady
Total	2,047,387	100.00	75	–
Valid votes	2,047,387	92.59		
Invalid/blank votes	163,939	7.41		
Total votes	2,211,326	100.00		
Registered voters/turnout	2,516,420	87.88		
Source: Belgian Elections

==== In detail ====
Party	Hainaut			Liège			Luxembourg			Namur			Walloon Brabant		
Party	Votes	Perc.	Seats	Votes	Perc.	Seats	Votes	Perc.	Seats	Votes	Perc.	Seats	Votes	Perc.	Seats
PS	279,647	38.19	15	184,469	30.11	8	38,295	23.23	1	83,082	27.87	4	45,723	19.47	2
MR	162,608	22.21	8	157,274	25.67	7	46,547	28.23	2	81,334	27.29	4	97,349	41.46	4
CDH	93,321	12.75	5	80,881	13.20	3	49,460	30.00	2	58,036	19.47	2	28,314	12.06	1
ECOLO	48,790	6.66	0	57,193	9.33	2	14,034	8.51	0	28,454	9.55	1	27,555	11.74	1
PTB/PVDA–GO!	42,629	5.82	0	50,682	8.27	2	2,848	1.73	0	14,749	4.95	0	6,592	2.81	0
PP	35,229	4.81	0	33,649	5.49	1	7,771	4.71	0	13,025	4.37	0	9,563	4.07	0
FDF	16,843	2.30	0	13,281	2.17	0	3,270	1.98	0	7,389	2.48	0	10,945	4.66	0
Total			28			23			5			11			8

Province	Constituency	PS	MR	cdH	Ecolo	PTB	PP	Total
Hainaut	Charleroi	5	3	1	0	0	0	9
Hainaut	Mons	3	1	1	0	0	0	5
Hainaut	Soignies	2	1	1	0	0	0	4
Hainaut	Thuin	2	1	0	0	0	0	3
Hainaut	Tournai-Ath-Mouscron	3	2	2	0	0	0	7
Liège	Huy-Waremme	2	2	0	0	0	0	4
Liège	Liège	5	3	2	1	1	1	13
Liège	Verviers	1	2	1	1	1	0	6
Luxembourg	Arlon-Marche-en-Famenne-Bastogne	1	1	1	0	0	0	3
Luxembourg	Neufchâteau-Virton	0	1	1	0	–	0	2
Namur	Dinant-Philippeville	2	2	0	0	0	0	4
Namur	Namur	2	2	2	1	0	0	7
Walloon Brabant	Nivelles	2	4	1	1	0	0	8
Total		30	25	13	4	2	1	75

== Brussels Parliament ==
2014 Brussels parliamentary election
- 25 May 2014

All 89 seats in the Brussels Parliament 45 seats needed for a majority
- Turnout: 83.62%
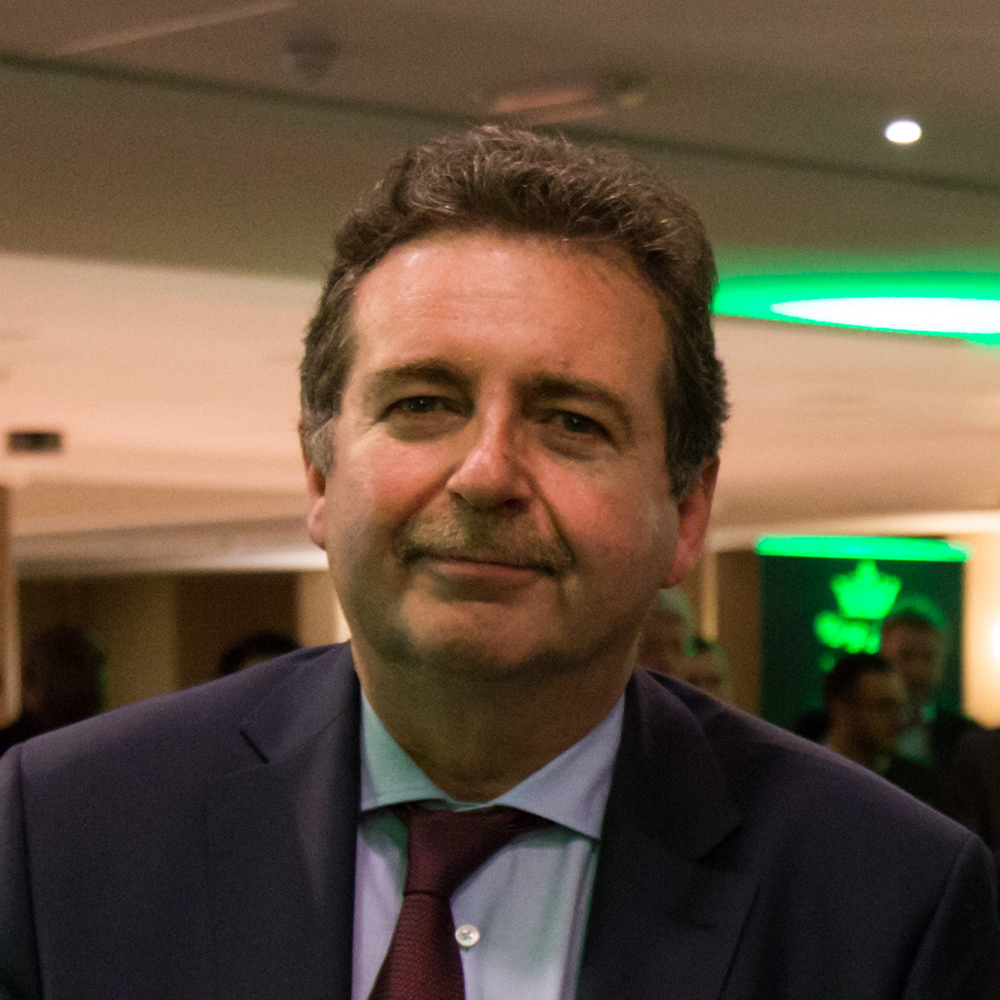

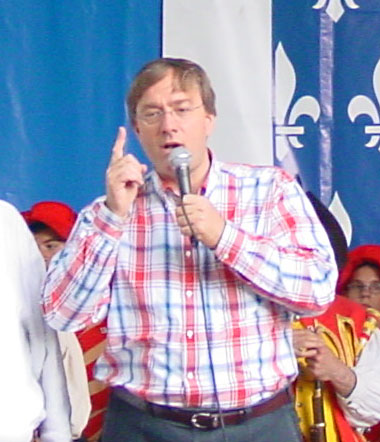

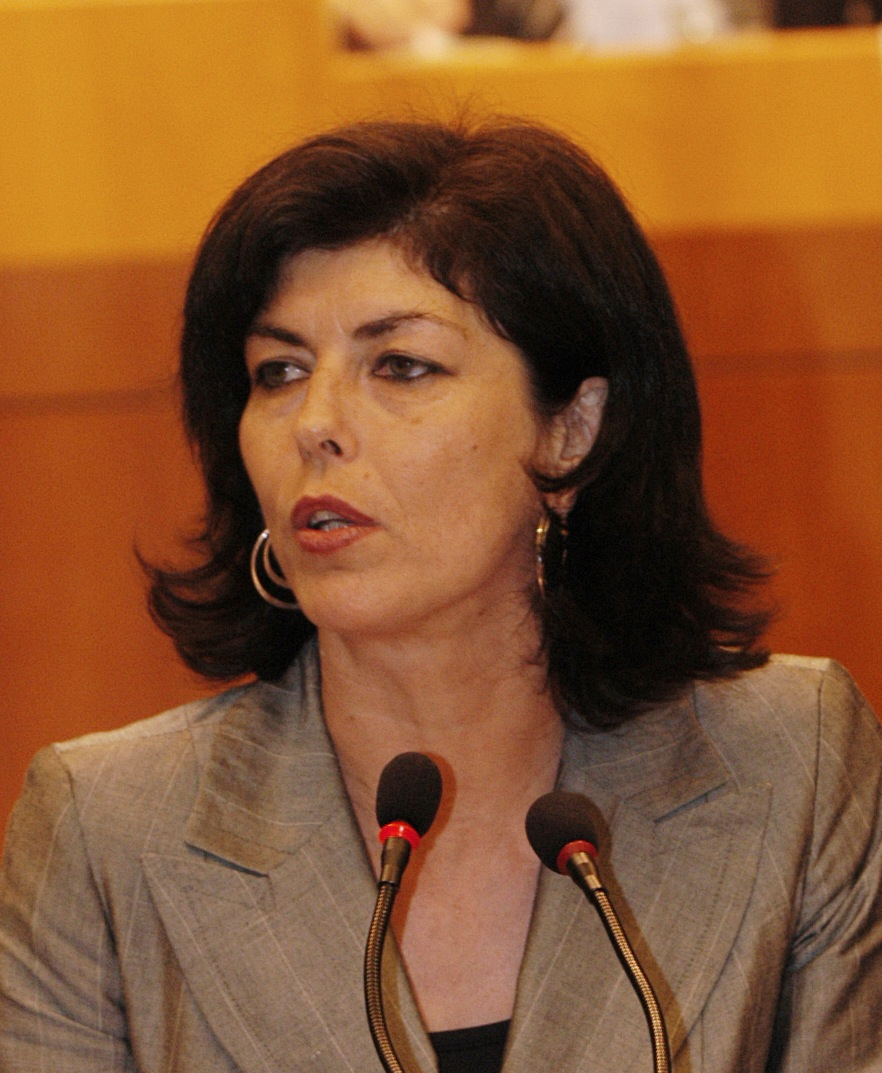

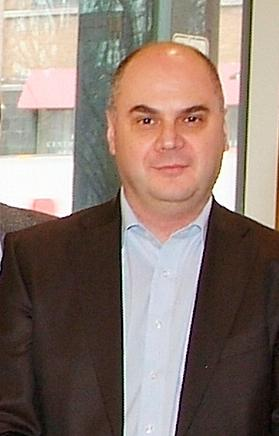

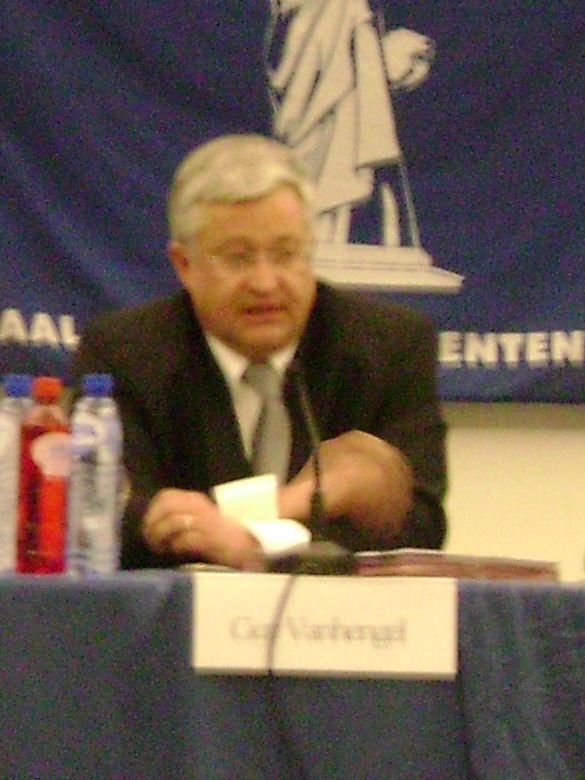
	First party	Second party	Third party
Leader	Rudi Vervoort	Vincent De Wolf	Didier Gosuin
Party	PS	MR	FDF
Last election	21 seats, 23.3%	24 seats, 26.5%	New party
Seats won	21	18	12
Seat change	Steady	▼6	New party
Popular vote	108,763	94,243	60,611
Percentage	23.5%	20.3%	13.1%
Swing	▲0.2%	▼6.2%	▲13.1%
	Fourth party	Fifth party	Sixth party
Leader	Joëlle Milquet	Christos Doulkeridis	Guy Vanhengel
Party	cdH	Ecolo	Open Vld
Last election	11 seats, 13.1%	16 seats, 17.9%	4 seats, 2.6%
Seats won	9	8	5
Seat change	▼2	▼8	▲1
Popular vote	48,021	41,368	14,296
Percentage	10.3%	8.9%	3.1%
Swing	▼2.8%	▼9.0%	▲0.5%
Brussels Government before election
Vervoort I Government
PS-Ecolo-cdH-VLD-CD&V-Groen!
Elected Brussels Government
Vervoort II Government
PS-FDF-cdH-VLD-sp.a-CD&V

All 89 members of the Parliament of the Brussels-Capital Region were elected. There are separate Dutch-language party lists and French-language party lists. Those voting for a Dutch-language party can also cast a vote for the Flemish Parliament election.

=== Opinion polls ===
Date	Polling Firm	MR	PS	Ecolo	cdH	VLD	sp.a	VB	CD&V	Groen	PTB/PVDA	N-VA	FDF	PP	Others	Lead
15 May	La Libre Belgique	21.0	19.2	8.5	10.9	3.5	2.5	-	-	-	7.5	2.0	11.5	3.8	9.6	1.8
23 Apr	Le Soir	20.3	22.5	9.6	9.8	4.4	0.8	-	1.4	-	6.0	-	9.3	3.9	12.0	2.2
15 Apr	La Libre Belgique	20.2	17.6	8.0	11.6	3.8	1.1	3.0	2.1	1.9	7.2	2.1	8.3	4.1	9.0	2.6
21 Feb	La Libre Belgique	21.8	18.1	10.1	12.5	3.6	1.0	1.0	1.6	2.9	6.5	2.7	10.4	3.0	4.8	3.7
13 Feb	Le Soir	20.0	21.2	9.6	10.4	4.3	2.9	0.7	0.8	2.5	6.8	2.6	9.6	2.3	6.3	1.2
2014
22 Nov	La Libre Belgique	22.6	20.8	10.6	12.2	2.4	2.3	2.0	1.6	2.1	2.3	1.7	11.8	2.2	5.4	1.8
21 Nov	Le Soir	18.7	24.1	11.3	9.7	-	-	-	-	-	-	-	-	-	36.2	5.4
6 Sep	La Libre Belgique	22.6	21.1	11.7	10.5	1.8	1.6	2.0	1.7	1.8	3.2	2.9	11.2	2.4	5.5	1.5
1 Sep	Le Soir	22.6	23.8	10.3	9.8	2.3	1.3	1.5	1.5	2.0	-	2.8	-	-	22.1	1.2
16 Jun	Le Soir	20.9	24.5	10.5	10.2	-	-	-	-	-	-	-	-	-	33.9	3.6
25 May	La Libre Belgique	21.9	19.9	12.4	9.8	2.1	2.4	3.0	1.7	1.4	2.4	3.2	11.4	1.8	6.6	2.0
22 Feb	La Libre Belgique	22.8	21.3	10.6	11.4	2.5	1.2	1.4	2.5	1.6	3.8	2.9	11.0	1.9	5.1	1.5
2013
2012
2011
10 Jun 2010	Federal Elections	27.1	26.6	12.0	12.2	2.3	2.0	1.7	1.6	1.6	1.6	1.8	-	3.5	6.1	0.5
2010
7 Jun 2009	Brussels Elections	26.5	23.3	17.9	13.1	2.6	2.2	2.0	1.7	1.3	0.9	0.6	-	-	8.0	3.2

=== Results ===
The French candidates receiving the most preference votes were Didier Gosuin (FDF, 22,906), Vincent De Wolf (MR, 19,919), Joëlle Milquet (cdH, 19,416), Charles Picqué (PS, 16,859) and Rudi Vervoort (PS, 16,742).

The Dutch candidate receiving the most preference votes was Guy Vanhengel (Open Vld, 7,375), significantly above the second one, Els Ampe (Open Vld, 2,883).

Party	Votes	%	Seats	+/–
French language group
Socialist Party	108,755	26.59	21	–
Reformist Movement	94,227	23.04	18	-6
Francophone Democratic Federalists	60,547	14.80	12	+12
Humanist Democratic Centre	48,012	11.74	9	-2
Ecolo	41,360	10.11	8	-8
PTB*PVDA-GO!	15,777	3.86	4	+4
Debout Les Belges!	9,424	2.30	–	–
People's Party	7,942	1.94	–	–
Islam	6,945	1.70	–	–
Pirate Party	3,026	0.74	–	–
La Droite	2,973	0.73	–	–
Pro Bruxsel	2,962	0.72	–	–
Vega	2,070	0.51	–	–
Nation	1,360	0.33	–	–
Gauches Communes	839	0.21	–	–
R	755	0.18	–	–
Égalitaires!	749	0.18	–	–
Belgische Unie – Union Belge	543	0.13	–	–
Libertarian Party	464	0.11	–	–
Rassemblement Wallonie France	175	0.04	–	–
FE-MDCEJ	143	0.03	–	–
Total	409,048	100.00	72	–
Dutch language group
Open Flemish Liberals and Democrats	14,250	26.70	5	+1
Socialist Party Differently	10,446	19.57	3	-1
Green	9,551	17.89	3	+1
New Flemish Alliance	9,075	17.00	3	+2
Christian Democratic and Flemish	6,102	11.43	2	-1
Flemish Interest	2,987	5.60	1	-2
Pro Bruxsel	662	1.24	–	–
Pensio(e)n Plus	306	0.57	–	–
Total	53,379	100.00	17	–
Valid votes	462,427	94.65		
Invalid/blank votes	26,156	5.35		
Total votes	488,583	100.00		
Registered voters/turnout	584,310	83.62		
Source: Belgian Elections

== German-speaking Community Parliament ==
2014 German-speaking parliamentary election
- 25 May 2014

All 25 seats in the Parliament of the German-speaking Community 13 seats needed for a majority
	First party	Second party	Third party
Leader	Robert Nelles	Oliver Paasch	Karl-Heinz Lambertz
Party	CSP	ProDG	PS
	Fourth party	Fifth party	Sixth party
Leader	Isabelle Weykmans	Michael Balter	Franziska Franzen
Party	MR	Vivant	Ecolo

All 25 members of the Parliament of the German-speaking Community were elected.

The incumbent government, led by Karl-Heinz Lambertz (SP), is a coalition of the Socialist Party (SP), the liberal Party for Freedom and Progress (PFF) and the regionalist ProDG. Only a few days after the elections, these parties agreed to continue their coalition government, but with Oliver Paasch (ProDG) as Minister-President since his party became bigger than SP.

Party	Votes	%	Seats	+/–
Christian Social Party	9,351	24.86	7	–
ProDG	8,352	22.21	6	+2
Socialist Party	6,047	16.08	4	-1
Party for Freedom and Progress	5,847	15.55	4	–
Vivant	3,994	10.62	2	–
Ecolo	3,590	9.54	2	-1
Libertarian Party	432	1.15	–	–
Total	37,613	100.00	25	–
Valid votes	37,613	88.87		
Invalid/blank votes	4,711	11.13		
Total votes	42,324	100.00		
Registered voters/turnout	49,000	86.38		
Source: Belgian Elections
