= 2014 Belgian government formation =

Following the simultaneous federal elections and regional elections of 25 May 2014, negotiations started to form a new Federal Government as well as new regional governments: a Flemish, Walloon, French Community and Brussels Government. A Government of the German-speaking Community was formed only a few days after the elections.

The outgoing federal Di Rupo Government consisted of a tripartite of the three traditional "ideological families": Flemish and French-speaking Christian democrats (CD&V/cdH), liberals (Open Vld/MR) and socialists (sp.a/PS).

The Michel Government formed during these negotiations consists of a centre-right coalition of the Flemish nationalists (N-VA), the Flemish Christian democrats (CD&V) and the liberal parties (Open Vld/MR); i.e. only one party at French-speaking side. The new Flemish Government reflects the same coalition, whereas the Walloon and French Community Governments are made up of the PS and cdH, main centre-left parties that now became opposition at federal level.

== Overview ==
Government		Outgoing coalition		Next coalition		Sworn in
Belgium	Federal Government	Di Rupo	Flemish side CD&V; Open Vld sp.a French side PS; MR cdH	Michel	Flemish side N-VA; CD&V; Open Vld; French side MR	11 October 2014
Flanders	Flemish Government	Peeters II	CD&V sp.a N-VA	Bourgeois	N-VA; CD&V; Open Vld	25 July 2014
Wallonia	French Community Government; Walloon Government	Demotte II	PS; Ecolo cdH	Demotte III; Magnette	PS cdH	22 July 2014
Brussels-Capital Region	Brussels Government	Vervoort I	French side PS cdH; Ecolo; Flemish side CD&V; Open Vld; Groen	Vervoort II	French side PS; FDF cdH; Flemish side Open Vld sp.a CD&V	20 July 2014
German Community in Belgium	German-speaking Community Government	Lambertz III	SP; PFF; ProDG	Paasch I	ProDG; PFF; PS	26/30 June 2014

== Timeline ==
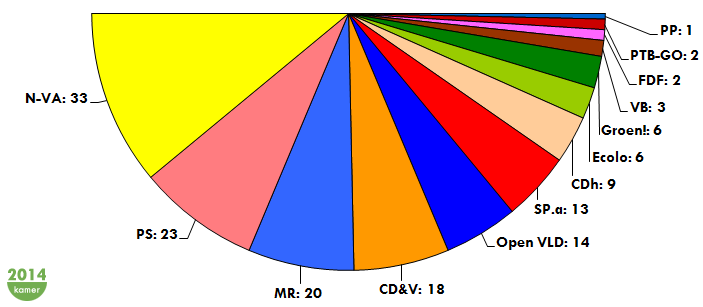
Federal Chamber of Representatives following the elections

Prior to the elections, N-VA expressed its desire to start with the formation of a Flemish Government before a Federal Government, a so-called "confederal logic". Forming regional governments is politically easier. CD&V however stressed the importance of negotiating at both levels in parallel.

=== Informateur Bart De Wever (N-VA) ===
On 27 May, two days after the elections, King Philippe nominated Bart De Wever (N-VA) as informateur, meaning he is tasked with finding enough points of agreement for a possible coalition.

Likely federal government coalitions were either a coalition of N-VA, CD&V, Open Vld and MR, cdH, or a continuation of the current tripartite Di Rupo Government (CD&V, Open Vld, sp.a and PS, MR, cdH). That last coalition now had a majority support among Flemish parties, which was not the case during the Di Rupo Government. The first possibility (with N-VA and without PS/sp.a) would not have a majority among Francophone parties. Majorities in language groups are not required, but politically preferred.

On 5 June 2014, the PS and cdH announced, to the surprise of all others, they were starting negotiations to form a Walloon Government. For the French language group in Brussels, PS, cdH and FDF would form a government. Parallel to this, for the Dutch language group in Brussels, Open Vld, CD&V and sp.a agreed to form a coalition. However, upon learning that FDF would be part of the French-speaking coalition, Open Vld and CD&V refused to cooperate. Later, the two parties dropped their concerns, and continued negotiations.

The following day, N-VA and CD&V announced as a reaction they were starting negotiations for a Flemish Government. Outgoing Minister Geert Bourgeois (N-VA) and outgoing Minister-President Kris Peeters (CD&V) led the negotiations, whereas Bart De Wever continued with his role as federal "informateur".

On 24 June 2014, "informateur" Bart De Wever sent a proposal to CD&V, MR and cdH to serve as a basis for the formation of a centre-right federal government. The text did not include any institutional changes, nor any far-reaching socio-economic reforms which would be unacceptable for French-speaking parties. CD&V and MR responded positively, whereas cdH rejected the text "due to a lack of trust between the parties". The media described cdH leader Benoît Lutgen as "Monsieur Non", referencing former cdH leader Joëlle Milquet who was nicknamed "Madame Non" in the 2007 government formation.

=== Informateur Charles Michel (MR) ===
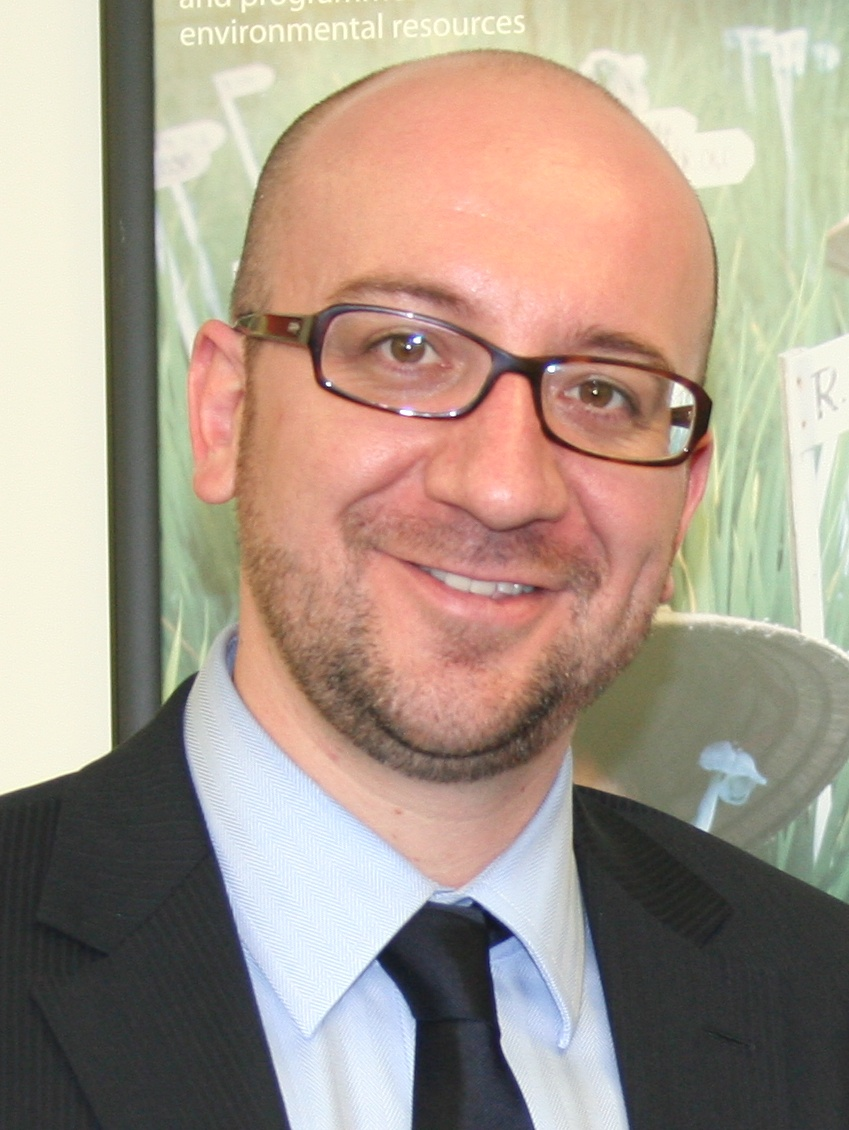
Charles Michel (MR)

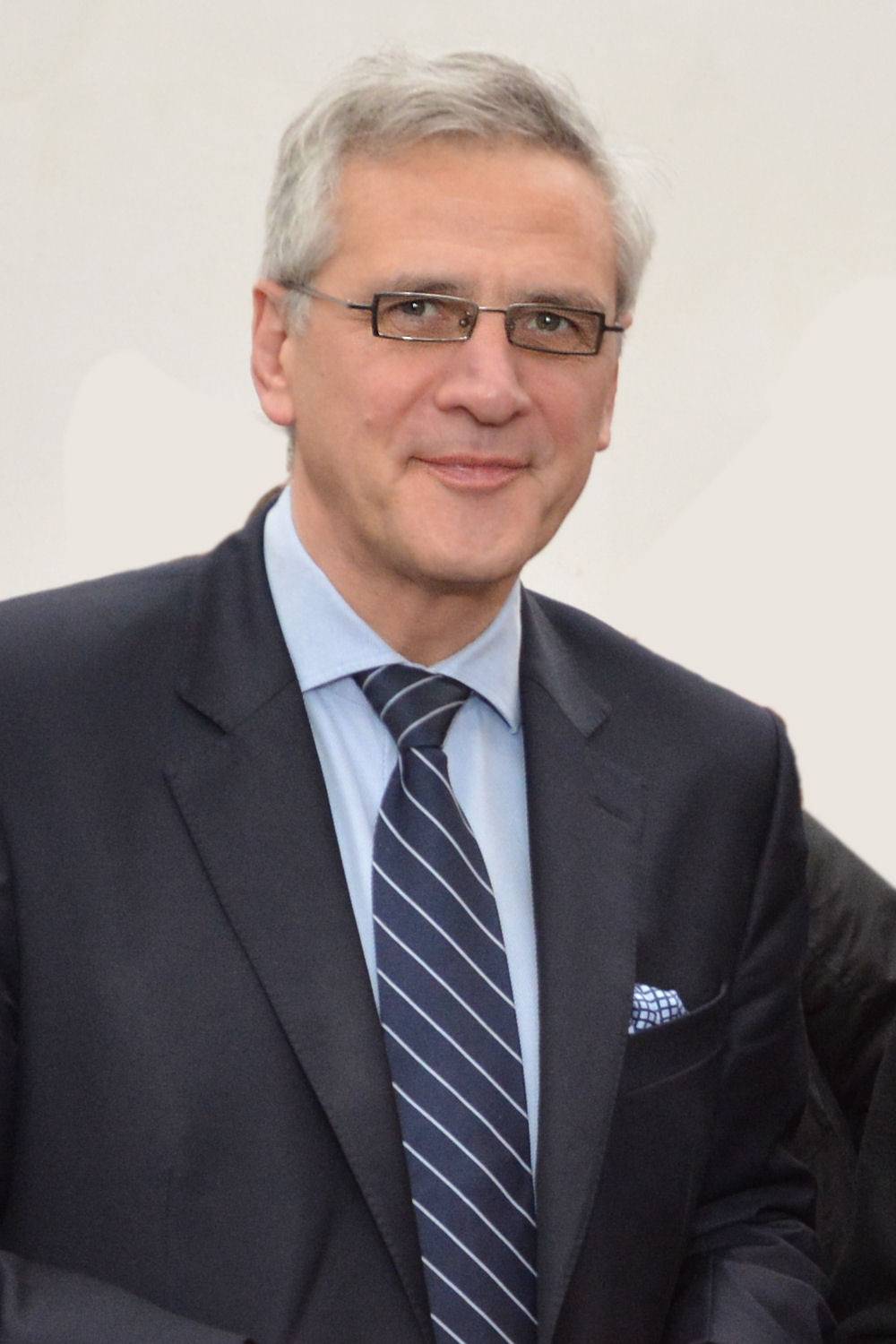
Kris Peeters (CD&V)

The next day, the King relieved De Wever of his task as "informateur". The King then held consultations with the leaders of the main parties, and on 27 June 2014, he nominated Charles Michel (MR) as "informateur". Due to the cdH's rejection of a centre-right coalition, all options were open, but each possibility posed a number of difficulties. PS, the largest French-speaking party, preferred a continuation of the tripartite Di Rupo Government, a scenario rejected by a majority of the Flemish population and businesses. Another possibility was a "kamikaze coalition" or "Swedish coalition", whereby MR would be the only French-speaking party in a coalition with N-VA, CD&V and Open Vld. As "informateur", Charles Michel talked with party leaders as well as employers' organizations, trade unions and other stakeholders. On 4 July 2014, the King extended his task for ten days, and on 14 July he extended his task until 22 July.

Meanwhile, regional government formations progressed steadily. The Brussels Government negotiation parties presented their coalition agreement on 14 July, and the Walloon/French Community negotiating parties presented their agreement on 18 July, both before the informal deadline of the National Holiday, 21 July 2014. On 20 July, the new Vervoort Brussels Government was sworn in. The Flemish Government formation however, initially aimed for 11 July (the Flemish Holiday) stalled in part due to the difficult budgetary situation, as well as the uncertainty regarding federal negotiations and disagreements between negotiating parties - the N-VA and CD&V.

On 22 July 2014, the N-VA and CD&V announced they would take Open Vld on board for the Flemish Government negotiations. Open Vld always said they wanted to be either part of both the federal and Flemish governments, or part of neither. The move paved the way for a federal "Swedish coalition" made up of CD&V, N-VA, Open Vld and MR, with outgoing Flemish Minister-President Kris Peeters (CD&V) as possible prime minister. As the King already expected informateur Charles Michel (MR) that day, he relieved him of his task and appointed him and Kris Peeters as formateurs.

=== Formateurs Kris Peeters (CD&V) and Charles Michel (MR) ===
Kris Peeters (CD&V) and Charles Michel (MR) prepared a draft, which was presented to the four negotiating parties as a basis for a coalition agreement. Each party has three negotiators:

- Wouter Beke, Koen Geens and Pieter De Crem for CD&V;
- Gwendolyn Rutten, Alexander De Croo and Maggie De Block for Open Vld;
- Didier Reynders, Olivier Chastel and Willy Borsus for MR;
- Bart De Wever and Jan Jambon for N-VA;
  - an additional rotating expert negotiator for N-VA, depending on the subject: Johan Van Overtveldt for economy, Theo Francken for asylum and migration, Hendrik Vuye for justice, Steven Vandeput for SMEs and fiscality, Zuhal Demir for labour, Elke Sleurs for poverty reduction and public health, Bert Wollants for energy, Siegfried Bracke for pensions, or Peter Dedecker for government enterprises.

A difficult political issue in the negotiations was the designation of the Belgian member of the Juncker Commission being formed. CD&V insisted on proposing Marianne Thyssen, a member of the European Parliament and the candidate preferred by Jean-Claude Juncker as they are from the same party and the Commission needs more female members. However, Kris Peeters was expected to become the next Prime Minister, giving CD&V the two most important political posts, which is unacceptable to the other parties. MR in its turn insisted on proposing Didier Reynders as European Commissioner. After long negotiations the parties ultimately agreed to propose Marianne Thyssen, with the Prime Minister to be a liberal (MR or Open Vld). This was eventually agreed to be Charles Michel. His party, MR, will already get half of the ministers due to the Constitution requiring an equal number of Dutch- and French-speaking ministers. As a fluent Dutch speaker, unlike his predecessor, Elio Di Rupo, barriers to his appointment on language grounds were unfounded.

Despite the parties' ideological proximity and the lack of state reform as a topic, the negotiations lasted longer than anticipated. On 7 October 2014, after a round of negotiations of more than 24 hours, the parties finally finalised their coalition agreement and confirmed that Charles Michel will be head of government.

== See also ==
- 2014 Belgian federal election
- 2014 Belgian regional elections
- 2019–2020 Belgian government formation
- 2010–11 Belgian government formation
