= Isabelle Weykmans =

Belgian politician

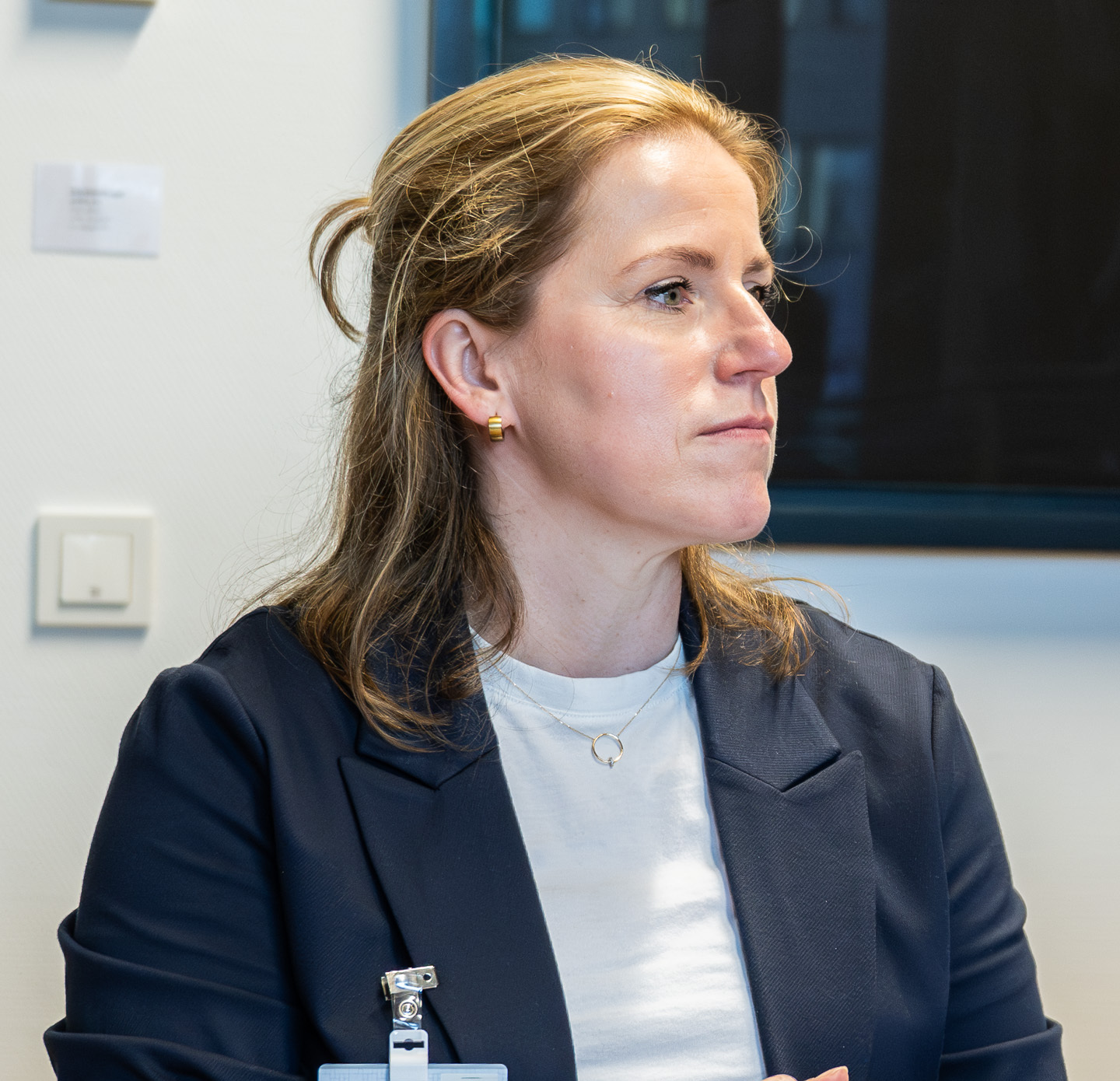
- Isabelle Weykmans in 2024

Minister of Sport, Employment and Media of the German-speaking Community
- Incumbent
- Assumed office 17 June 2019
- Preceded by: Herself (as Minister of Culture, Media and Tourism)

Minister of Culture, Media and Tourism of the German-speaking Community
- In office 23 June 2009 – 17 June 2019
- Succeeded by: Herself (as Minister of Minister of Sport, Employment and Media)

Personal details
- Born: 6 December 1979 (age 46) Eupen, Belgium
- Party: Partei für Freiheit und Fortschritt
- Education: Université de Namur; Université libre de Bruxelles

Isabelle Weykmans (born 3 December 1979) is a Belgian politician of the Partei für Freiheit und Fortschritt (PFF). She has been Minister in the Government of the German-speaking Community since 2004 and is currently responsible for the areas of culture, employment and tourism.

== Early life and education ==
After graduating from high school, Weykmans studied political science at the Université de Namur and the Université libre de Bruxelles (ULB) until 2002. She then took a master's degree with a focus on international relations at the European Institutes in Berlin and Nice, which she completed in 2002 and 2003.

Weykmans then became an advisor to the Senator of the German-speaking Community Berni Collas (PFF) in Brussels. Weykmans was already politically active in the JFF (Youth for Freedom and Progress), the youth movement of the PFF, from 2000 onwards. In 2003 she became the movement's vice-president. On 13 June 2004, Weykmans ran for the first time on the PFF European list as a substitute candidate in third place.

During the negotiations to form a government with the Socialist Party (SP) and the regional party PJU-PDB (today ProDG), the PFF was awarded two out of four ministerial posts. One of these ministerial posts should be occupied by a woman. In July 2004, Weykmans was the first woman to hold a ministerial office in the DG's government, led by Karl-Heinz Lambertz (SP), and thus became Europe's youngest minister. There, she took over the areas of culture, media, monument protection, youth and sport.

Weykmans was able to successfully maintain her place in the government and coalition participation of the PFF in the subsequent elections in 2009 and 2014. Since 30 June 2014 she has been Vice Minister-President and Minister for Culture, Employment and Tourism in the government under Minister-President Oliver Paasch (ProDG).

At the local level, Weykmans was a member of the Eupen City Council from 2006 to 2009.

== Personal life ==
Weykmans is in a relationship with the French lawyer Mathieu Cagnault and has a daughter and a son with him.
