= List of members of the Council of the German Cultural Community, 1977–1978 =

This is a list of members of the Council of the German Cultural Community between 1977 and 1978, following the direct elections of 1977.

== Composition ==
Party	Seats	+/–
Christian Social Party (Christlich Soziale Partei, CSP)	10	▼2
Party of German-speaking Belgians (Partei der Deutschsprachigen Belgier, PDB)	7	▲1
Party for Freedom and Progress (Partei für Freiheit und Fortschritt, PFF)	5	▲1
Parti Socialiste (Sozialistische Partei, SP)	3	0
	25	

== Sources ==
- "Members of the DG Parliament". The Parliament of the German-speaking Community. Archived from the original on 2012-04-15.
