= List of members of the Council of the German Cultural Community, 1974–1977 =

This is a list of members of the Council of the German Cultural Community between 1974 and 1977, following the (first) direct elections of 1974.

== Composition ==
Party	Seats
Christian Social Party (Christlich Soziale Partei, CSP)	12
Party of German-speaking Belgians (Partei der Deutschsprachigen Belgier, PDB)	6
Party for Freedom and Progress (Partei für Freiheit und Fortschritt, PFF)	4
Parti Socialiste (Sozialistische Partei, SP)	3
	25

== Sources ==
- "Members of the DG Parliament". The Parliament of the German-speaking Community. Archived from the original on 2012-04-15.
