= Government of the German-speaking Community =

- Regierung der Deutschsprachigen Gemeinschaft; DG-Regierung
- Coat of arms of the German-speaking Community of Belgium

Overview
- Established: 31 January 1984; 42 years ago
- Country: Belgium
- Polity: German-speaking Community of Belgium
- Leader: Minister-President
- Appointed by: Parliament of the German-speaking Community
- Headquarters: Haus Grand Ry, Eupen
- Website: ostbelgienlive.be

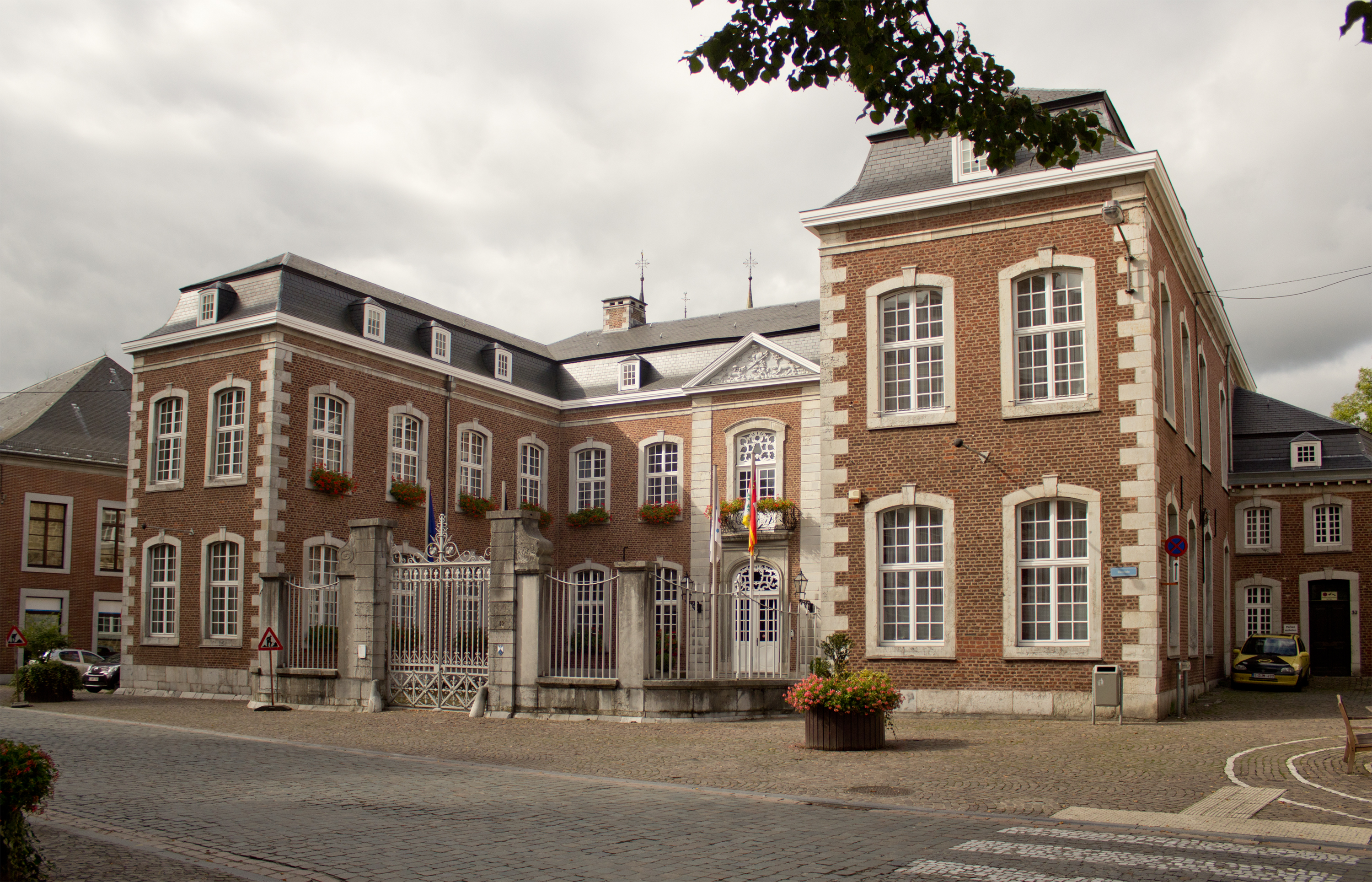
Haus Grand Ry, Eupen

The government of the German-speaking Community (German: Regierung der Deutschsprachigen Gemeinschaft, pronounced [ʁeˈɡiːʁʊŋ deːɐ ˈdɔʏtʃˌʃpʁaːxɪɡn̩ ɡəˈmaɪnʃaft]; DG-Regierung) is the executive body of the German-speaking Community of Belgium, located in the east of the province of Liège. The members are chosen by the Parliament of the German-speaking Community.

== Compositions ==
=== Compositions 2024–2029 ===
Following the 9 June 2024 election, ProDG (8 seats) and PFF (3 seats) now formed a coalition with the CSP (5 seats) instead of the PS, which moved to the opposition for the first time since 1990.

Government of the German-speaking Community - Paasch III
Party	Name	Function
ProDG	Oliver Paasch	Minister-President; Minister of Finance and Urban Development
CSP	Jérôme Franssen	Minister of Education and Employment
PFF	Gregor Freches	Minister of Culture, Sport, Youth and Tourism
ProDG	Lydia Klinkenberg	Minister of Social Affairs

=== Compositions 2019–2024 ===
Following the 26 May 2019 election, ProDG (6 seats), the PS (4 seats) and PFF (3 seats) parties continued their coalition of the previous five years.

Government of the German-speaking Community - Paasch II
Party	Name	Function
ProDG	Oliver Paasch	Minister-President; Minister of Local Government and Finances
PS	Antonios Antoniadis (politician)	Vice Minister-President; Minister of Health, Social Affairs, Spatial Development and Housing
PFF	Isabelle Weykmans	Minister of Sport, Employment and Media
ProDG	Lydia Klinkenberg (from 12 October 2020)	Minister of Education and Scientific Research
ProDG	Harald Mollers (until 15 September 2020)	Minister of Education and Scientific Research

- On 15 September 2020, Harald Mollers resigned from his position as Minister of Education and Scientific Research to protect his private life and family. One month later he was replaced by Lydia Klinkenberg

=== Compositions 2014–2019 ===
Following the 25 May 2014 election, ProDG (6 seats), the PS (4 seats) and PFF (4 seats) parties formed a coalition.

Government of the German-speaking Community - Paasch I
Party	Name	Function
ProDG	Oliver Paasch	Minister-President; Minister of Local Government
PFF	Isabelle Weykmans	Minister of Culture, Media and Tourism
ProDG	Harald Mollers	Minister of Education
PS	Antonios Antoniadis (politician)	Minister of Social Affairs

=== Compositions 2009–2014 ===
Government of the German-speaking Community - Lambertz III
Party	Name	Function
PS	Karl-Heinz Lambertz	Minister-President; Minister of Local Government
ProDG	Oliver Paasch	Minister of Education, Formation/Training and Employment
PFF	Isabelle Weykmans	Minister of Culture, Media and Tourism
ProDG	Harald Mollers	Minister of Family, Public Health and Social Affairs

=== Compositions 2004–2009 ===
Government of the German-speaking Community - Lambertz II
Party	Name	Function
PS	Karl-Heinz Lambertz	Minister-President; Minister of Local Government
PFF	Bernd Gentges	Vice-Minister-President; Minister of Formation/Training and Employment, Social Affairs and Tourism
ProDG	Oliver Paasch	Minister of Education and Scientific Research
PFF	Isabelle Weykmans	Minister of Culture, Media, Protection of Monuments, Youth and Sports
