= List of members of the Council of the German Cultural Community, 1978–1981 =

This is supposed to be a list of members of the Council of the German Cultural Community between 1978 and 1981, following the direct elections of 1978.

== Sources ==
- "Members of the DG Parliament". The Parliament of the German-speaking Community. Archived from the original on 2012-04-15.
