= Minister-President of the German-speaking Community =

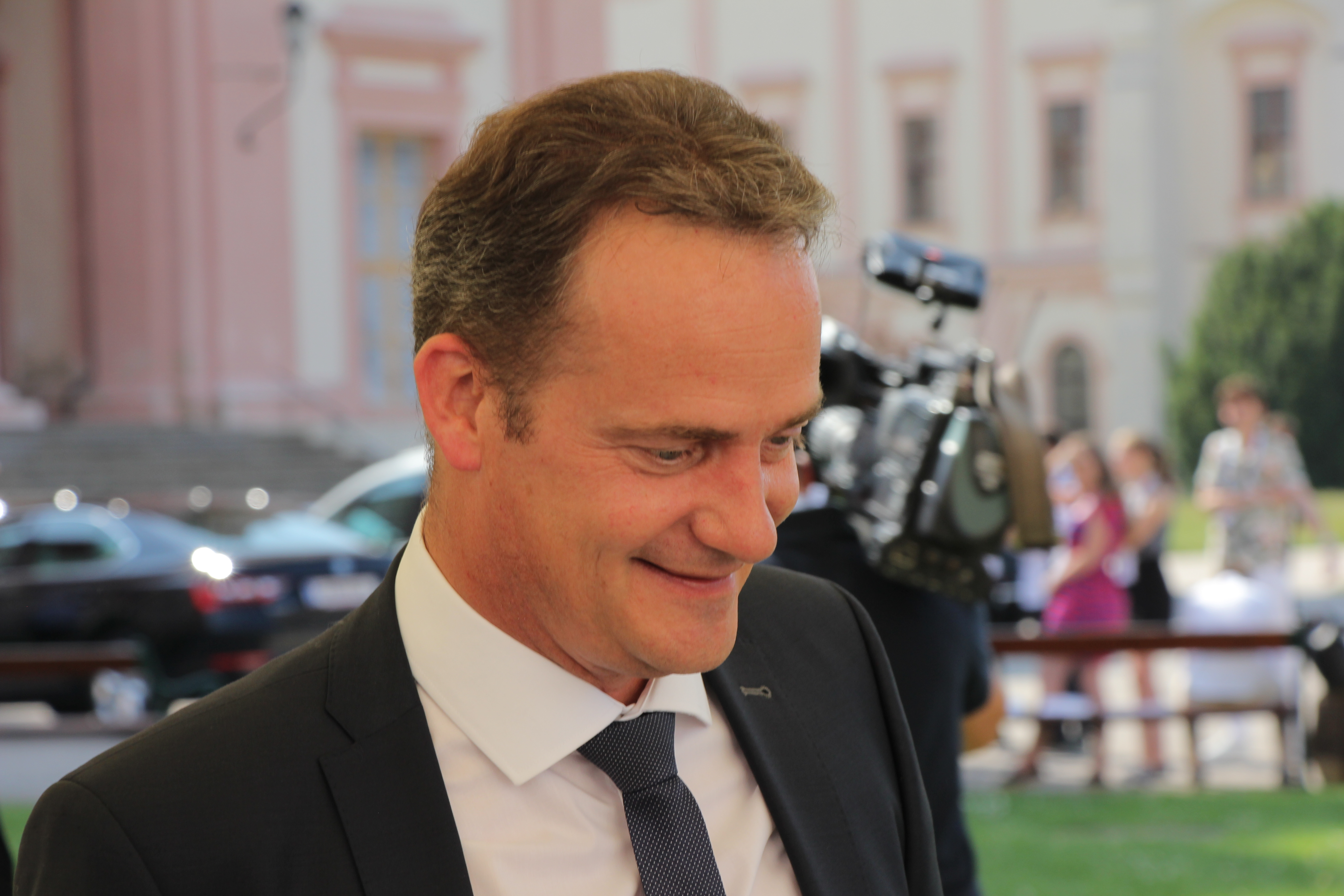
Oliver Paasch, Minister-President from 2014

The minister-president of the German-speaking Community (German: Ministerpräsident der deutschsprachigen Gemeinschaft) is the head of the Government of the German-speaking Community of Belgium, one of the three Communities of the country.

== List of officeholders ==
No.	Portrait	Name (Born–Died)	Term of office			Party	Government	Coalition
No.	Portrait	Name (Born–Died)	Took office	Left office	Time in office	Party	Government	Coalition
1		Bruno Fagnoul (1936–2023)	30 January 1984	11 November 1986	2 years, 285 days	PFF	Fagnoul	PFF, CSP, SP
2		Joseph Maraite (1949–2021)	11 November 1986	6 July 1999	12 years, 238 days	CSP	Maraite I	CSP, PFF
2		Joseph Maraite (1949–2021)	11 November 1986	6 July 1999	12 years, 238 days	CSP	Maraite II	CSP, PFF, SP
2		Joseph Maraite (1949–2021)	11 November 1986	6 July 1999	12 years, 238 days	CSP	Maraite III	CSP, SP
3		Karl-Heinz Lambertz (1952– )	6 July 1999	30 June 2014	14 years, 358 days	SP	Lambertz I	SP, PFF, Ecolo
3		Karl-Heinz Lambertz (1952– )	6 July 1999	30 June 2014	14 years, 358 days	SP	Lambertz II	SP, PFF, PJU-PDB
3		Karl-Heinz Lambertz (1952– )	6 July 1999	30 June 2014	14 years, 358 days	SP	Lambertz III	SP, PFF, ProDG
4		Oliver Paasch (1971– )	30 June 2014	present	11 years, 228 days	ProDG	Paasch I	ProDG, SP, PFF
4		Oliver Paasch (1971– )	30 June 2014	present	11 years, 228 days	ProDG	Paasch II	ProDG, SP, PFF
4		Oliver Paasch (1971– )	30 June 2014	present	11 years, 228 days	ProDG	Paasch III	ProDG, CSP, PFF

== See also ==
- Prime Minister of Belgium
- Minister-President of the Brussels-Capital Region
- Minister-President of Flanders
- Minister-President of the French Community
- Minister-President of Wallonia
