= Joseph Maraite =

Belgian politician (1949–2021)

Minister-President of the German-speaking Community
- In office 3 December 1986 – 14 July 1999
- Preceded by: Bruno Fagnoul
- Succeeded by: Karl-Heinz Lambertz

Personal details
- Born: 11 September 1949 Waimes, Belgium
- Died: 25 April 2021 (aged 71) St. Vith, Belgium
- Party: CSP

Joseph Maraite (11 September 1949 – 25 April 2021) was a Belgian politician of the German-speaking Community.

== Biography ==
A member of the Christlich Soziale Partei, Maraite became a member of the Council of the German-speaking Community in 1977. In 1986, he succeeded Bruno Fagnoul as Minister-President of the German-speaking Community. He served until he was replaced by Karl-Heinz Lambertz in 1999. From 2004 to 2017, he served as Mayor of Burg-Reuland.

Joseph Maraite died in St. Vith on 25 April 2021 at the age of 71.
