= Jérôme Franssen =

Belgian politician (born 1982)

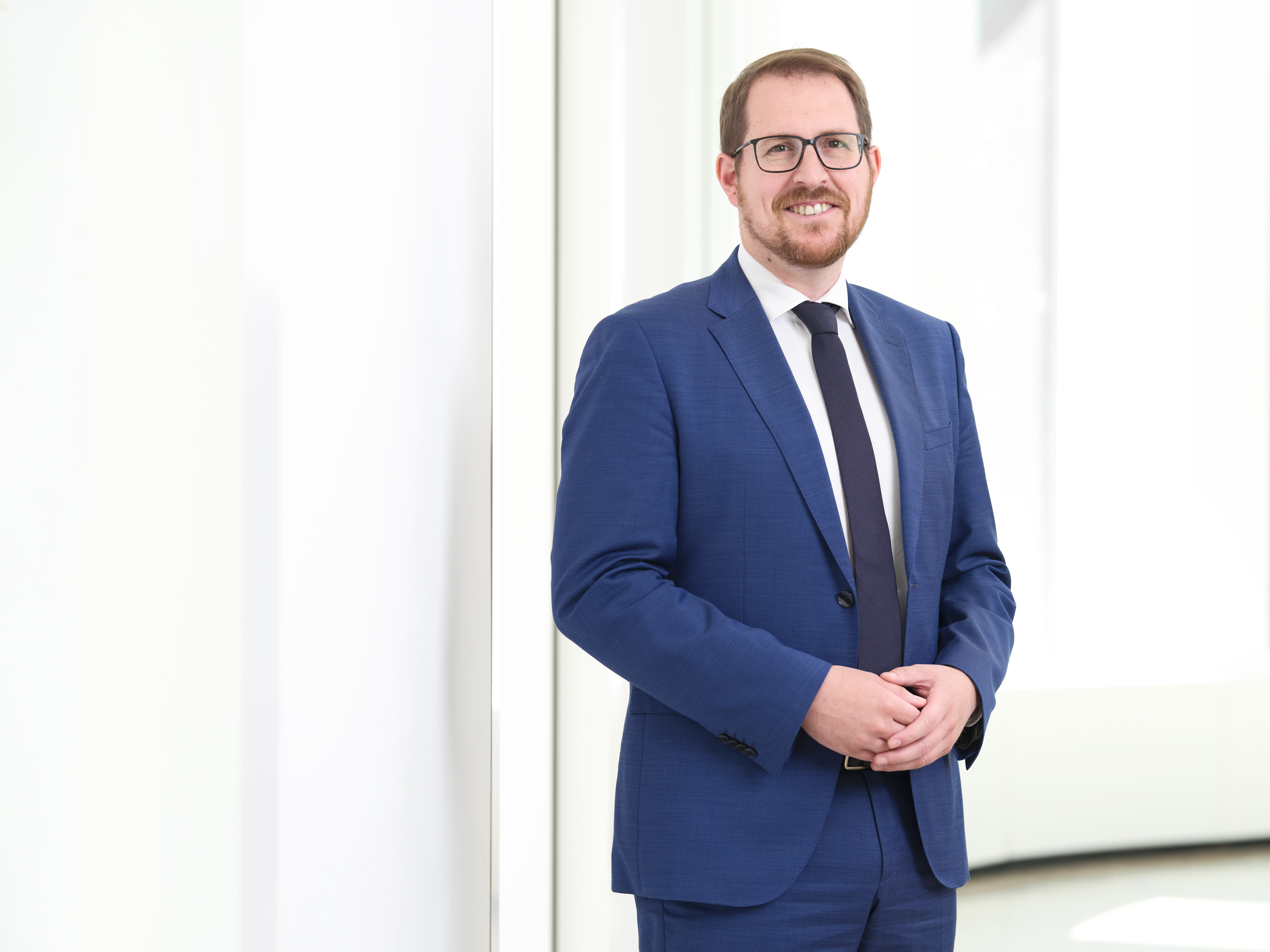

Leader of the Christian Social Party
- Incumbent
- Assumed office 11 November 2025
- Preceded by: Pascal Arimont

Personal details
- Born: 5 June 1982 (age 44) Aachen, Belgium
- Party: Christian Social Party

Jérôme Franssen is a Belgian politician from the German-speaking community of Belgium, he has been the leader of the Christian Social Party since 2020. Franssen has also been Minister for Education, Training and Employment in the German-speaking Community since 2024.

== Political career ==
Franssen studied at Goethe University Frankfurt and RWTH Aachen University, where he completed his studies in history, political science and philosophy (Master of Arts). From 2017 to 2021 he was a member of the German-speaking communities parliament before becoming the mayor of Raeren in 2021. He resigned as mayor when he was re-elected to the parliament in 2024 and became the leader of the Christian Social Party, and the Minister for Education, Training and Employment for the community.

Some points that Franssen has brought up during his tenure have been a focus on implementing AI into the educational system, a ban on mobile phone usage in schools, expanding the VPS department at the RSI, support for international university cooperation in the Euregio and various other changes.
