= Lydia Klinkenberg =

Belgian politician

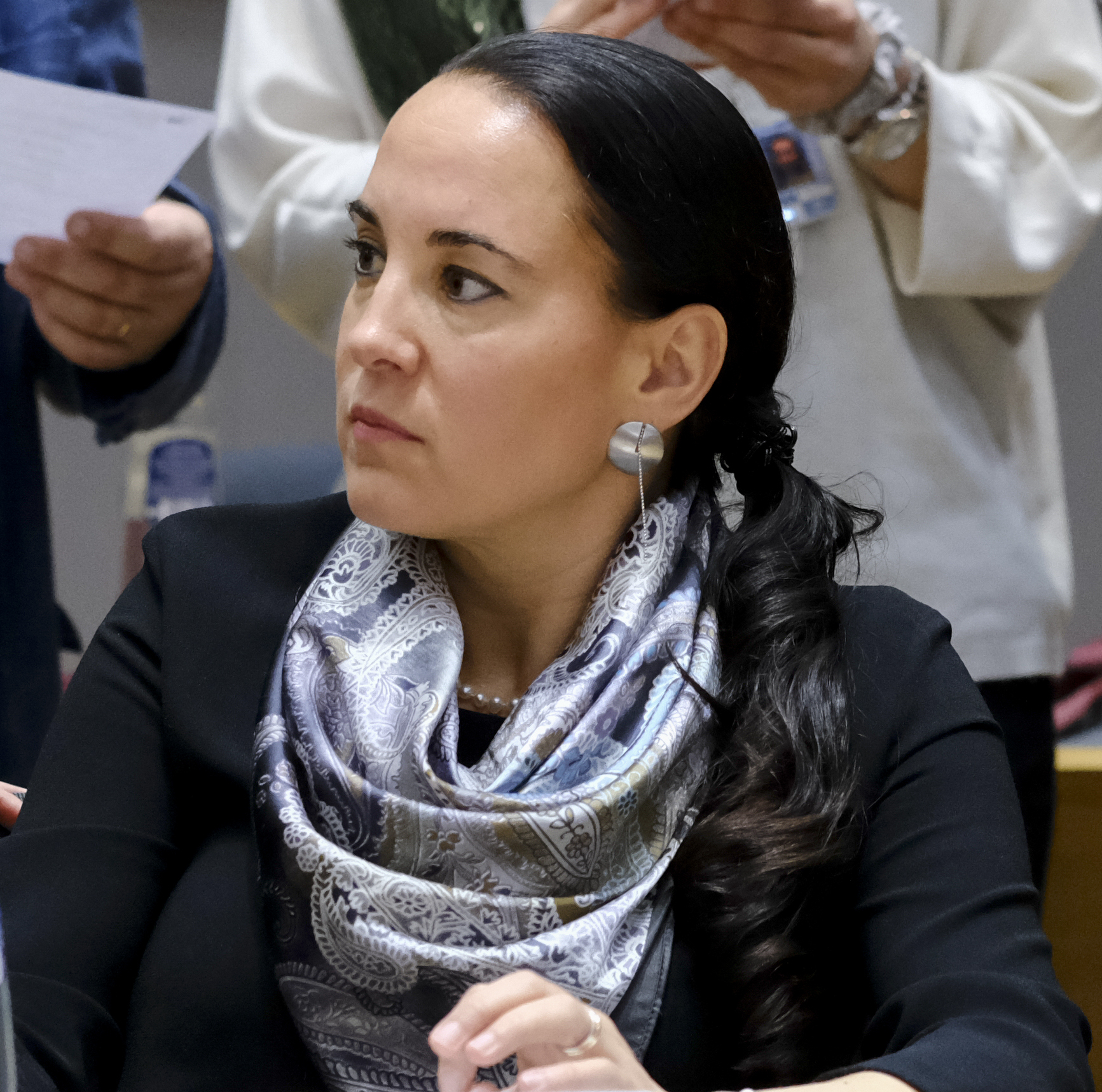
- Lydia Klinkenberg in 2023.
- Born: 1981 (age 44–45)
- Occupation: Politician
- Years active: 2009 - present

Lydia Klinkenberg (born 3 October 1981) is a Belgian politician, currently serving as Minister of Family, Social Affairs, Housing and Health of the Government of the German-speaking Community. She is a member of the ProDG party.

== Career ==
She was first elected to the Parliament of the German-speaking Community in 2009.

In October 2020, she was named Minister of Education for the German-speaking community in Belgium. In March 2021, she gathered with the Flemish and Wallonian education ministers to call on the federal government to make teachers a priority in COVID-19 vaccination targets.
