= German-speaking electoral college =

Constituency of the European Parliament

- European Parliament constituency
- Location among the current constituencies

- Shown within Belgium
- Member state: Belgium
- Created: 1994
- MEPs: 1

The German-speaking electoral college is one of three constituencies of the European Parliament in Belgium. It elects just one MEP for East Belgium, making it the only such constituency, effectively making it first past the post between parties (the party with the most votes gets the seat).

However, the electoral system in Belgium uses semi-open lists, therefore the winning candidate is theoretically not necessarily the first candidate on the winning party list. The semi-open list uses a 50% threshold for preference votes (due to having only one MEP), making it the highest in European Parliament elections.

This is the European Parliament's smallest constituency, with an electorate at the 2004 election of just 46,914.

== Boundaries ==
The constituency corresponds to the German-speaking Community of Belgium.

== Member of the European Parliament ==
Term	Member	Party
1994–2014	Mathieu Grosch	Christian Social Party (EPP)
2014–present	Pascal Arimont	Christian Social Party (EPP)

== Election results ==
Results over time

=== 2019 ===
Party	EP Group	Votes	%	Change
Christian Social Party (CSP)	EPP	14,247	34.90	▲4.54
Ecolo	G-EFA	6,675	16.40	▼0.26
ProDG	None	5,360	13.10	▼0.12
Partei für Freiheit und Fortschritt (PFF)	ALDE	4,684	11.50	▼4.55
Socialist Party (SP)	S&D	4,655	11.40	▼3.71
Vivant	None	4,550	11.16	▲2.55
DierAnimal	GUE/NGL	606	1.49	▲1.49
Total		40,777		–

=== 2014 ===
Party	EP Group	Votes	%	Change
Christian Social Party (CSP)	EPP	11,739	30.36	▼1.89
Ecolo	G-EFA	6,440	16.66	▲1.08
Partei für Freiheit und Fortschritt (PFF)	ALDE	6,204	16.05	▼4.32
Socialist Party (SP)	S&D	5,841	15.11	▲0.48
ProDG	None	5,113	13.22	▲3.15
Vivant	None	3,328	8.61	▲2.36
Total		38,665		–

=== 2009 ===
Party	EP Group	Votes	%	Change
Christian Social Party (CSP)	EPP	12,475	32.25	▼10.23
Partei für Freiheit und Fortschritt (PFF)	ALDE	7,878	20.37	▼2.42
Ecolo	G-EFA	6,025	15.58	▲5.09
Socialist Party (SP)	PES	5,658	14.63	▼0.31
ProDG	None	3,895	10.07	▲0.77
Vivant	None	2,417	6.25	New
Europa de Weirte	None	328	0.85	New
Total		38,680		–

=== 2004 ===
Party	EP Group	Votes	%	Change
Christian Social Party (CSP)	EPP	15,722	42.49	▲6.02
Partei für Freiheit und Fortschritt (PFF)	ELDR	8,434	22.79	▲3.19
Socialist Party (SP)	PES	5,527	14.94	▲3.52
Ecolo	G-EFA	3,880	10.49	▼6.52
Party of German-speaking Belgians (PDB)	None	3,442	9.3	▼0.62
Total		37,005		–

=== 1999 ===
Party	EP Group	Votes	%	Change
Christian Social Party (CSP)	EPP	13,456	36.47	▲5.18
Partei für Freiheit und Fortschritt (PFF)	ELDR	7,234	19.60	▼0.46
Ecolo	G-EFA	6,276	17.01	▲ +2.11
Socialist Party (SP)	PES	4,215	11.42	▲1.15
Party of German-speaking Belgians (PDB)	None	3,661	9.92	▼5.59
Vivant	None	1,198	3.25	New
All Others	—	860	2.16	—
Total				–

=== 1994 ===
Party	EP Group	Votes	%
Christian Social Party (CSP)	EPP	11,999	31.29
Partei für Freiheit und Fortschritt (PFF)	ELDR	7,690	20.06
Party of German-speaking Belgians (PDB)	None	5,945	15.51
Ecolo	G	5,714	14.90
Socialist Party (SP)	PES	4,820	12.57
Juropa	None	1,969	5.14
Workers' Party of Belgium (PAB)	None	205	0.53
Total			
