= Pascal Arimont =

Belgian politician (born 1974)

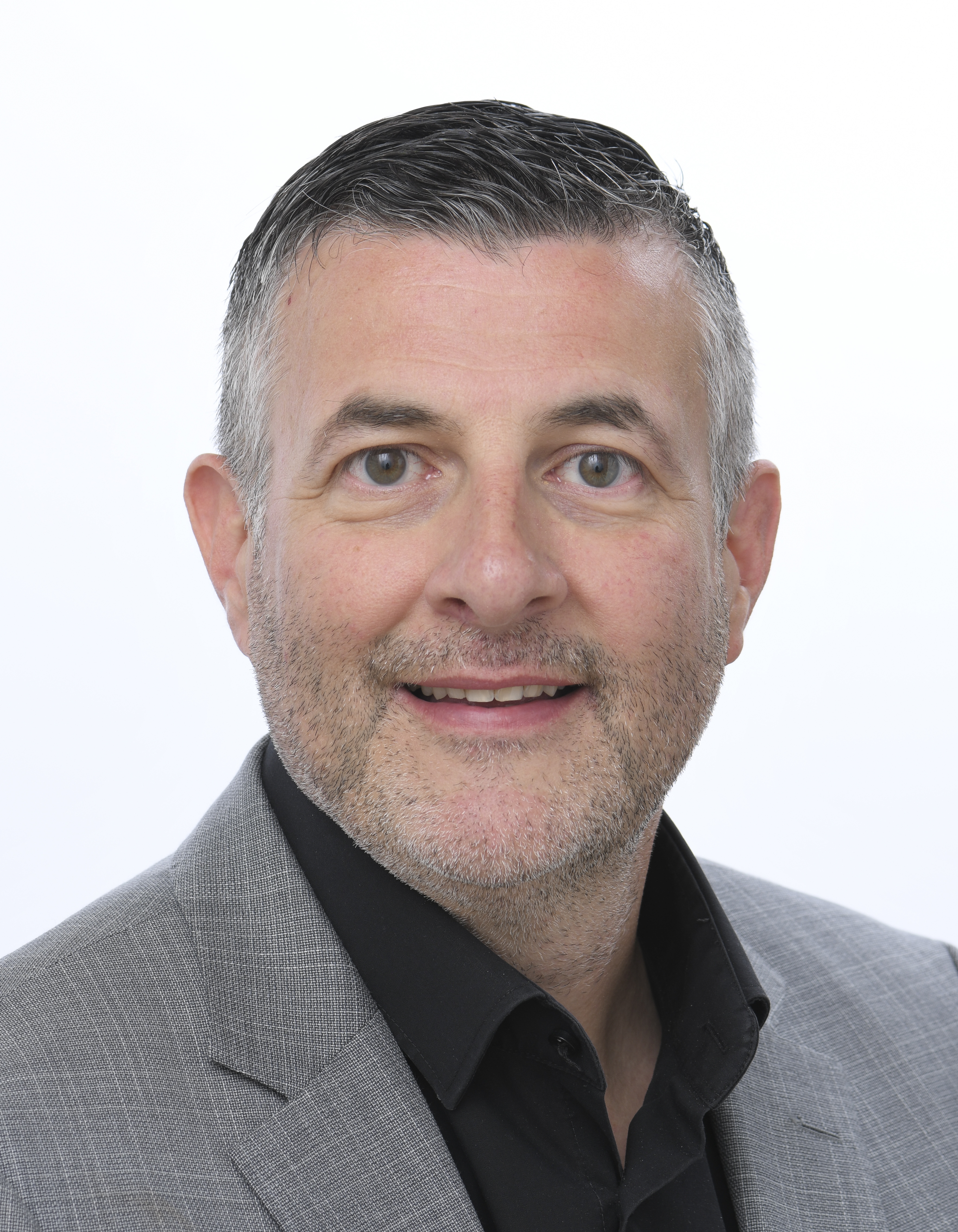
- Official portrait, 2024

Member of the European Parliament
- Incumbent
- Assumed office 1 July 2014
- Preceded by: Mathieu Grosch
- Constituency: German-speaking electoral college

Personal details
- Born: 25 September 1974 (age 51) Malmedy
- Party: Christian Social Party (CSP)
- Website: pascal-arimont.eu

Pascal Arimont (born 25 September 1974) is a Belgian Member of the European Parliament (MEP) for the Christian Social Party, which sits in the EPP Group, as the single MEP from the German-speaking electoral college of Belgium.

== Early life and career ==
Arimont was born in Malmedy and grew up in Born (municipality of Amel) in the German-speaking Community of Belgium.

From 1998 to 2002, Arimont was parliamentary assistant to MEP Mathieu Grosch.

== Political career ==
=== Role in local politics ===
From 2006 until 2009, Arimont served as provincial councillor of Liège (and thus advisory member of the Parliament of the German-speaking Community). From 2009 until 2014 he was (full) member of that Parliament, where he was parliamentary group leader for the CSP.

=== Member of the European Parliament, 2014–present ===
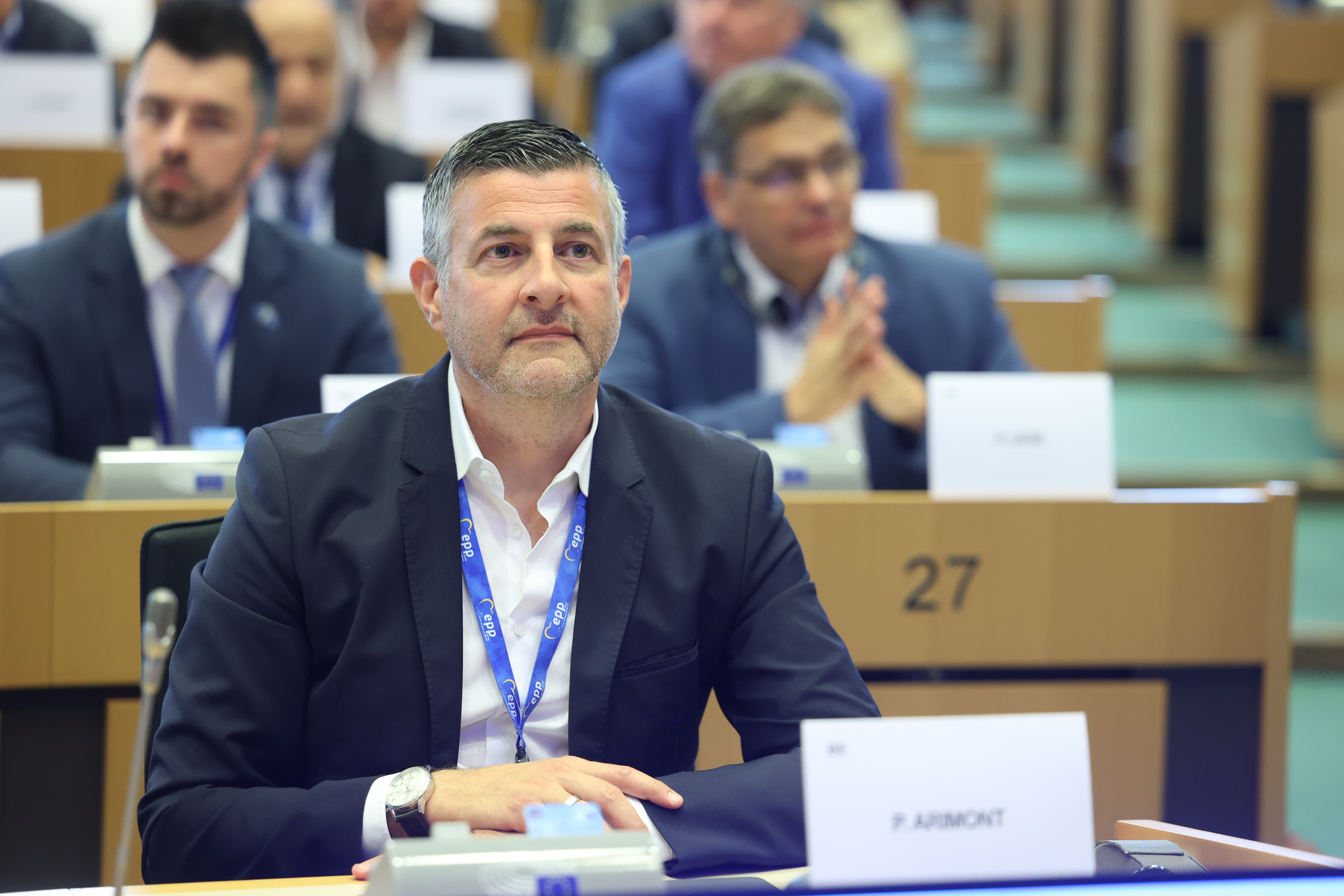
Arimont in the European Parliament

In 2014, Mathieu Grosch, who was the single German-speaking MEP since 1994, decided not to stand for re-election, and Arimont was the CSP's candidate in the 2014 European Parliament elections. Arimont was elected and joined the European People's Party Group.

In 2019, Arimont would be re-elected to the European parliament. He would be re-elected again in 2024.

In the European Parliament, Arimont serves on the Committee on Regional Development and the Committee on Legal Affairs (since 2021). Since 2021, he has been part of the Parliament's delegation to the Conference on the Future of Europe.

In addition to his committee assignments, Arimont is part of the parliament's delegations for relations with the countries of Central America and to the Euro-Latin American Parliamentary Assembly. He is also a member of the European Parliament Intergroup on the Welfare and Conservation of Animals.

In October 2024, Arimont called for an investigation into F1 owner Liberty Media, believing that Liberty Media's ownership of F1 and moves to acquire MotoGP may violate European competition laws.

== Controversy ==
In December 2021, Arimont's house was attacked while his family was inside; a Molotov cocktail was thrown under his children's bedroom windows.
