= Karl-Heinz Lambertz =

Belgian politician

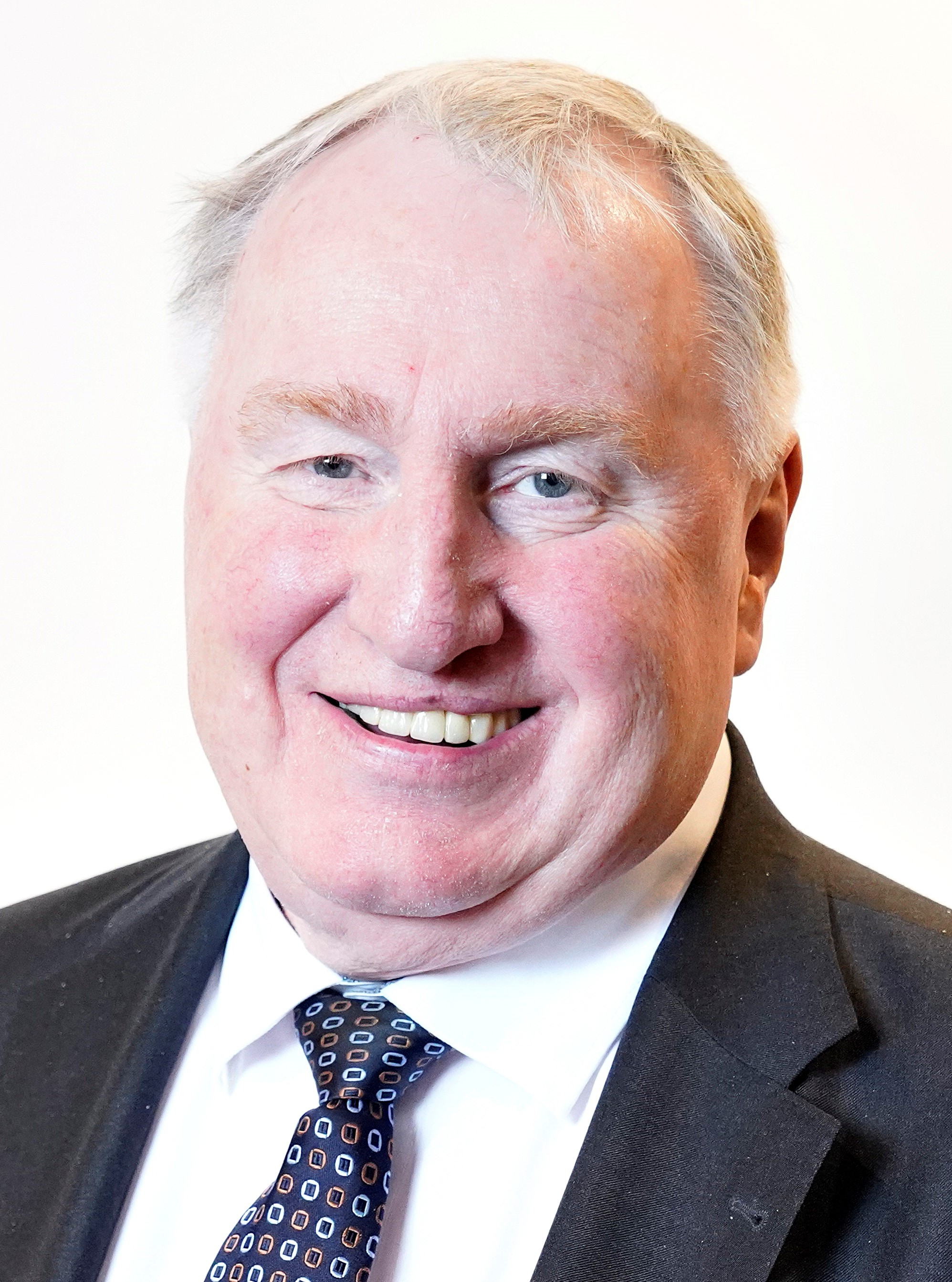

Senator of the German-speaking Community in Belgium
- Incumbent
- Assumed office 19 September 2016
- Preceded by: Alexander Miesen

Minister-President of the German-speaking Community
- In office 6 July 1999 – 30 June 2014
- Preceded by: Joseph Maraite
- Succeeded by: Oliver Paasch

President of the European Committee of the Regions
- In office 12 July 2017 – 12 February 2020
- Preceded by: Markku Markkula
- Succeeded by: Apostolos Tzitzikostas

Personal details
- Born: 4 June 1952 (age 74) Schoppen, Belgium
- Party: Socialist Party
- Education: Université catholique de Louvain

Karl-Heinz Lambertz (born 4 June 1952) is a Belgian politician holding a master's degree in law from the University of Louvain (UCLouvain) with an additional specialisation in German law (University of Heidelberg). Lambertz was president of the European Committee of the Regions (CoR) from 12 July 2017 until 12 February 2020 after serving a 2 1/2-year term as first vice-president. He is also president of the Parliament of the German-speaking Community of Belgium.

Born on 4 June 1952 in Schoppen, Lambertz' interest in politics came early in his career, having served as President of the German-speaking Youth Council (1975–1980). After a number of functions linked to his academic background in law, he became a member of Parliament for the German-speaking Community in 1981.

Between 1990 and 1999, he held numerous ministerial posts in the German-speaking Community government before being elected as Minister-President (1999–2014). In 2014, he became President of the Parliament for the first time, a post he held until 2016 before he was appointed to represent the German-speaking Community in the Belgian Senate. In June 2019, he resumed office as president of the Parliament, a position which he holds today.

Lambertz has been a CoR member since 2001 and was president of the CoR's PES Group between 2011 and 2015. Since 2000, he has been a member of the Congress of Local and Regional Authorities of the Council of Europe, in which he is currently vice-president.

On 17 July 2008, he was one of three senior Belgian politicians commissioned by King Albert II to investigate ways of enabling constitutional reform talks in the light of the long-running Belgian constitutional crisis.

== Honours ==
- 2014: Grand Cross of the Order of the Crown.
