= ProDG (Belgium) =

ProDG Pro Deutschsprachige Gemeinschaft
- Leader: Clemens Scholzen
- Founded: 2008
- Merger of: PJU and PDB
- Headquarters: Kaperberg 6, 4700 Eupen
- Ideology: Christian democracy; Social liberalism; Regionalism
- Political position: Centre to centre-right
- European affiliation: EFA (2008–2018); FUEN (since 2014)
- Chamber of Representatives: 0 / 150
- Senate: 0 / 60
- Parliament of the German-speaking Community: 8 / 25
- European Parliament (German-speaking seats): 0 / 1

Website
- prodg.be

ProDG (German: Pro Deutschsprachige Gemeinschaft, lit. 'Pro-German-speaking Community') is a regionalist, Christian democratic political party active in the German-speaking Community of Belgium. The party brings together politicians from the previous Party of German-speaking Belgians (PDB) and Parteilos Jugendliche Unabhängige (PJU) movement. The party was formed in 2008 and first featured on the electoral ballot in 2009. Following the 2009 regional election, the party won four out of 25 seats in the Parliament and participated in the regional Government of the German-speaking Community of Belgium with two ministers. In the 2014 regional election, the party won six seats and its leader Oliver Paasch became the new minister-president.

The party was formerly a member of the European Free Alliance. The party is a member of the Federal Union of European Nationalities since 2014.

== Election results ==
=== German-speaking Community Parliament ===
Election year	# of votes	% of votes	# of seats won	+/-	Notes
2009	6,553	17.5 (#4)	4 / 25		In a government coalition with SP & PFF
2014	8,352	22.2 (#2)	6 / 25	▲2	In a government coalition with SP & PFF
2019	9,146	23.3 (#1)	6 / 25	0	In a government coalition with SP & PFF
2024	11,654	29.1 (#1)	8 / 25	▲2	In a government coalition with CSP & PFF

=== European Parliament ===
Election	List leader	Votes	%		Seats	+/-	EP Group
Election	List leader	Votes	G.E.C.	Overall	Seats	+/-	EP Group
2009	Harald Mollers	3,897	10.07 (#5)	0.06	0 / 22	New	−
2014	Lydia Klinkenberg	5,106	13.23 (#5)	0.08	0 / 21	0	−
2019	Lydia Klinkenberg	5,360	13.14 (#3)	0.08	0 / 21	0	−
2024	Liesa Scholzen	7,134	13.43 (#2)	0.10	0 / 21	0	−
