= Parliament of the German-speaking Community =

Regional government in Belgium

Coordinates: 50.6311°N 6.0406°E

Parliament of the German-speaking Community Parlament der Deutschsprachigen Gemeinschaft
- List of members of the Parliament of the German-speaking Community, 2024–2029

Type
- Type: Unicameral

Leadership
- Speaker: Patricia Creutz-Vilvoye, CSP since 2019

Structure
- Seats: 25
- Political groups: Government (16): ProDG (8); CSP (5); PFF (3); Opposition (9): Vivant (4); SP (3); Ecolo (2)
- Length of term: 5 years

Elections
- Last election: 2024
- Next election: 2029

Meeting place
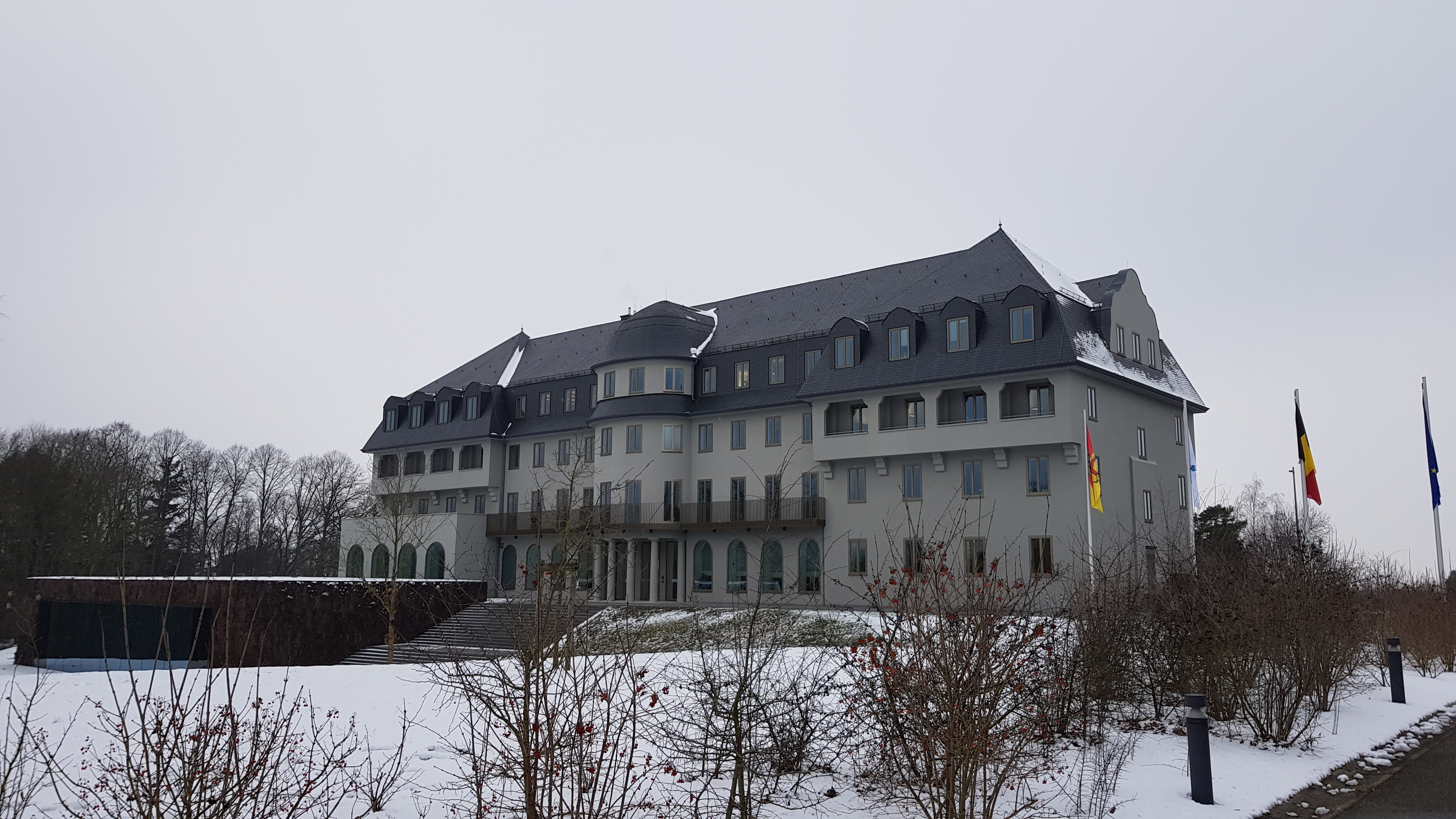
- Platz des Parlaments 1, Eupen

Website
- https://pdg.be/

The Parliament of the German-speaking Community (German: Parlament der Deutschsprachigen Gemeinschaft [paʁlaˈmɛnt deːɐ ˈdɔʏtʃˌʃpʁaːxɪɡn̩ ɡəˈmaɪnʃaft] or PDG) is the legislative assembly of the German-speaking Community of Belgium located in Eupen.

The most important tasks of the Parliament of the German-speaking Community include the election and the supervision of the Government of the German-speaking Community, the adoption of decrees for the German-speaking Community and the preparation and adoption of the annual budget.

== Members and elections ==
The Parliament of the German-speaking Community has 25 members who are directly elected every 5 years, to run in tandem with the European Parliament elections. These are the only members who have the right to speak and to vote. In addition, there are also some members with a consultative vote who are not actually members of the Parliament, but who do have the right to attend and participate in meetings.

The advisory members are the Provincial Councillors of Liège Province, the members of the Walloon Parliament, the members of the Chamber of Representatives and the members of the Senate who reside in the German-speaking area of Belgium and who have taken the oath of office in German, as well as the MEP elected by the German-speaking electoral college.

== History ==
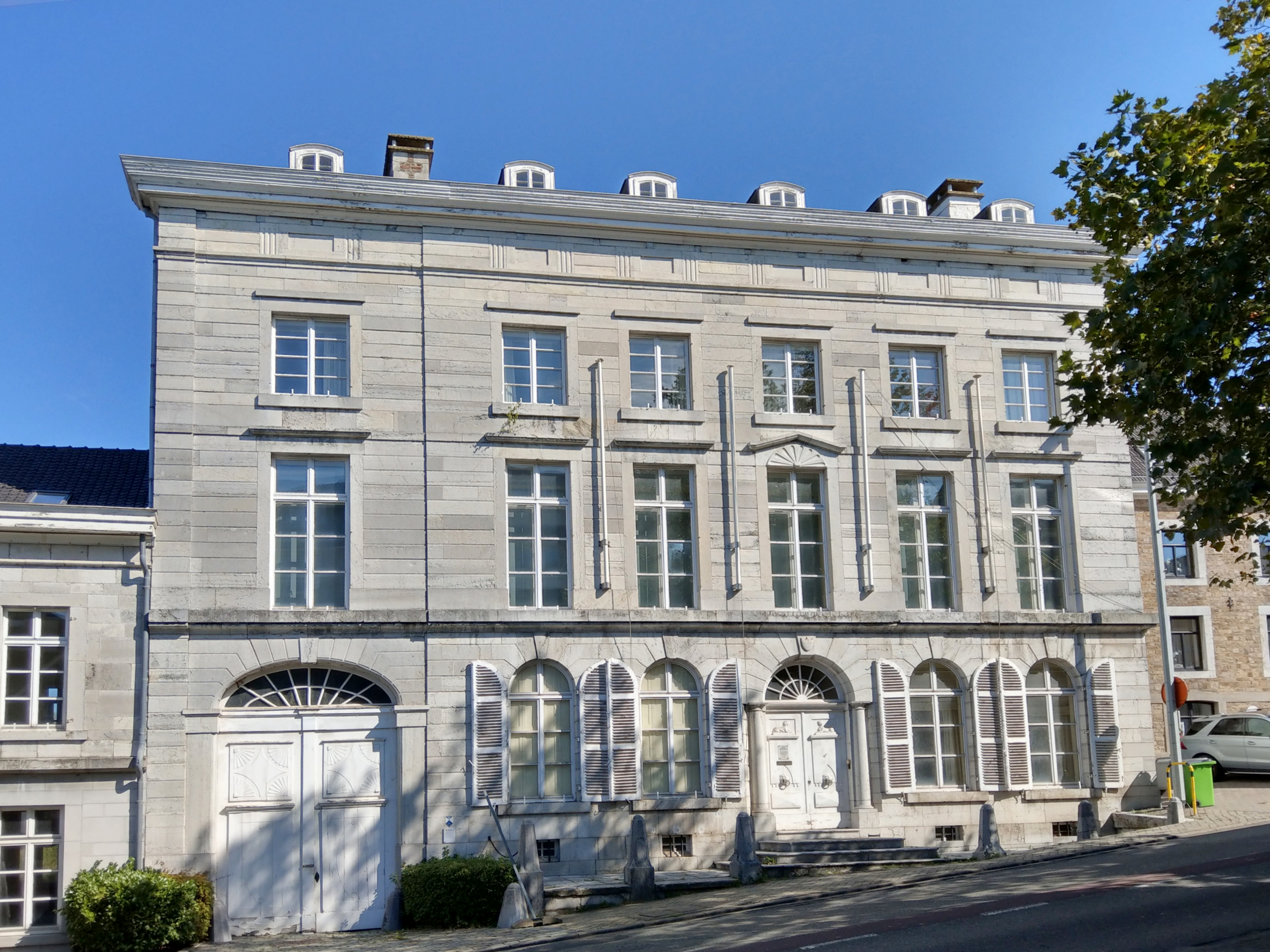
Old location of the Parliament (Kaperberg, Eupen)

Since October 1973 the German-speaking Community has had its own parliament, which was initially known as the Council of the German Cultural Community (German: Rat der deutschen Kulturgemeinschaft). In 1973, the members were not directly elected, but the distribution of seats was determined by the election results for the national Parliament. However, in March 1974, the first direct elections for the Council of the German Cultural Community took place. The name of the parliament was changed to Council of the German-speaking Community (German: Rat der Deutschsprachigen Gemeinschaft) in 1984, and to Parliament of the German-speaking Community in 2004.

At the end of 2013, the Parliament moved from its old location in Kaperberg to a renovated building in Kehrweg that once served as a Sanitorium.

== Powers ==
The German-speaking Community has powers over cultural, linguistic and "personal" matters (e.g. education, health care) like the Dutch- and French-speaking communities of Belgium.

The Government of the Walloon Region exercises regional matters over the territory in Parliament through a representative from the German-speaking Community. However, there has been some debate as to whether or not German-speakers should have their own region. As article 139 of the Belgian Constitution specifies, the Walloon Region may transfer some regional powers to the German-speaking Community, which it has done in the following policy areas:

- In 1995: Monuments and Heritage
- In 2000: Archaeological Matters and Employment Policy
- In 2005: Supervision of the Church Council; Supervision of Municipalities and Policing Districts; the Financing of Municipalities; Funerals and Gravestones

However, by contrast with the country's other two linguistic communities, it has no control over the language used in administration, because all municipalities are municipalities with language facilities in French.

== Current composition ==
Following the 2024 regional election, the make-up of the Parliament of the German-speaking Community is as follows:

Affiliation	Members
ProDG	8
Christian Social Party (CSP)	5
Vivant	4
Socialist Party (SP)	3
Party for Freedom and Progress (PFF)	3
Ecolo	2
Total	25

The Socialist Party, the liberal Party for Freedom and Progress and the regionalist ProDG signed an agreement on 10 June 2009 to form the a coalition government. It is the first time in the history of the German-speaking Community that an outgoing government coalition succeeded itself. Under the terms of the agreement, Karl-Heinz Lambertz (SP) remained Minister-President and Louis Siquet (SP) stayed on as Community Senator until January 2010, at which point he was replaced by a socialist.

In May 2014, a few days after the elections, the three incumbent government parties agreed to continue their government coalition. However, since ProDG became bigger than the Socialist Party in the elections, the new Minister-President was Oliver Paasch (ProDG). Five years later, the same parties again quickly agreed to continue their coalition, still led by Paasch.

== Committees ==
The Parliament of the German-speaking Community currently has 5 committees:

- Committee I on General Policy, Local Government, Petitions, Finances and Cooperation
- Committee II on Culture
- Committee III on Education and Training
- Committee IV on Health, Employment and Social Affairs
- Oversight Committee on Electoral Expenditure and Communications of the Public Authorities of the German-speaking Community
