= Oliver Paasch =

Belgian politician (born 1971)

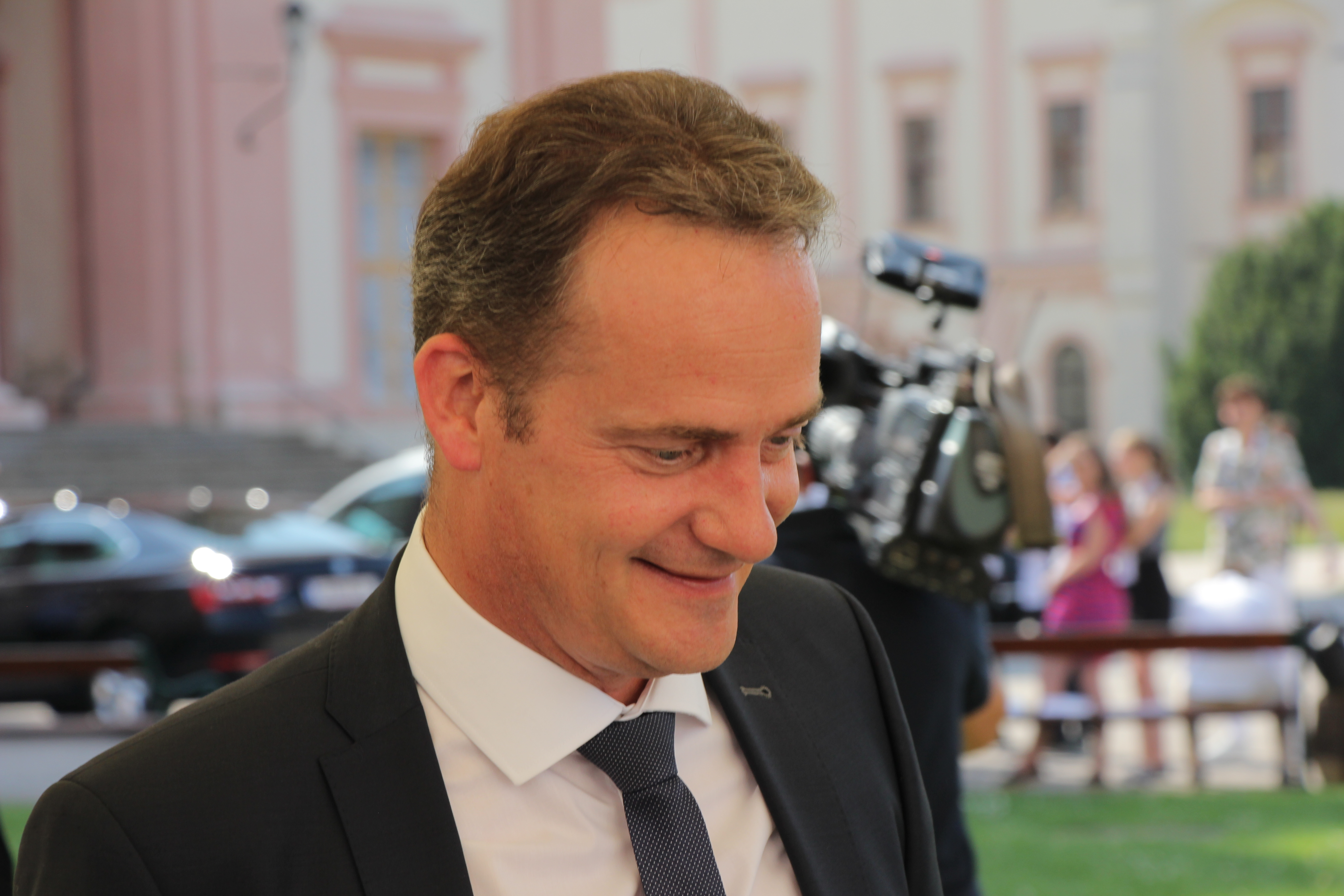
Paasch at the Europaforum Wachau in Göttweig Abbey, 2019

Oliver Paasch (German pronunciation: [ˈɔlɪvɐ ˈpa:ʃ]; Malmedy, 21 October 1971) is a Belgian politician of the German-speaking Pro Deutschsprachige Gemeinschaft party and the incumbent Minister-president of the German-speaking Community of Belgium.

Between 2004 and 2014 he held several ministerial posts in the Government of the German-language Community. In June 2014 he replaced Karl-Heinz Lambertz as Minister-President of the German-speaking Community.

== Honors and Awards ==
Officer of the Order of Legion of Honour

Political offices
Preceded by Karl-Heinz Lambertz	Minister-President of the German-speaking Community; 2014–	Incumbent
