= Perspectives. Freedom. Progress. =

Perspectives. Freedom. Progress. Perspektiven. Freiheit. Fortschritt.
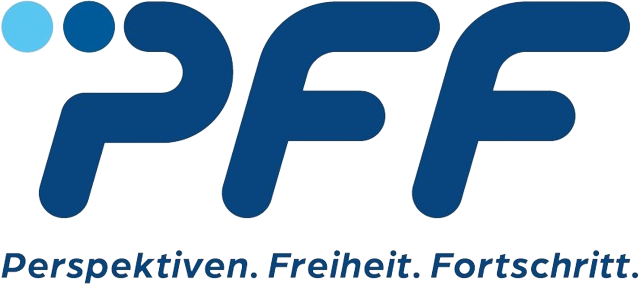
- Abbreviation: PFF
- President: Kattrin Jadin
- Founded: 1961
- Headquarters: Kaperberg 6, 4700 Eupen
- Ideology: Liberalism; Social liberalism
- Political position: Centre
- National affiliation: Reformist Movement
- European affiliation: Alliance of Liberals and Democrats for Europe
- European Parliament group: Renew Europe
- International affiliation: Liberal International
- Flemish counterpart: Open Flemish Liberals and Democrats
- Francophone counterpart: Reformist Movement
- Colours: Blue
- Chamber of Representatives (French-speaking seats): 1 / 61
- Senate (French-speaking seats): 0 / 24
- Walloon Parliament: 0 / 75
- Parliament of the German-speaking Community: 4 / 25
- European Parliament (German-speaking seats): 0 / 1

Website
- pff.be

Perspectives. Freedom. Progress. (German: Perspektiven. Freiheit. Fortschritt., PFF) is a regional liberal political party in the German-speaking Community of Belgium.

Until 2023, the party still retained the German version of the name of the all-Belgian liberal party which had existed between 1961 and 1992, the Party for Freedom and Progress (German: Partei für Freiheit und Fortschritt) before changing to its current name, and it is a constituent member of the Reformist Movement.

== Election results ==
=== European Parliament ===
Election	List leader	Votes	%		Seats	+/−	EP Group
Election	List leader	Votes	G.E.C.	Overall	Seats	+/−	EP Group
1994	Unclear	7,690	20.06 (#2)	0.13	0 / 25	New	−
1999	Berni Collas	7,234	19,60 (#2)	0.12	0 / 25	0	−
2004	Berni Collas	8,434	22.79 (#2)	0.13	0 / 24	0	−
2009	Bernd Gentges	7,878	20.37 (#2)	0.12	0 / 22	0	−
2014	Axel Kittel	6,197	26.06 (#3)	0.10	0 / 21	0	−
2019	Yves Derwahl	4,684	11.49 (#4)	0.07	0 / 21	0	−
2024	Sacha Brandt	5,891	13.57 (#3)	0.08	0 / 22	0	−

== See also ==
- Liberalism
- Contributions to liberal theory
- Liberalism worldwide
- List of liberal parties
- Liberal democracy
- Liberalism in Belgium
