= Namur (Chamber of Representatives constituency) =

Parliamentary constituency in Belgium

- Namen; Namür
- Constituency for the Chamber of Representatives
- Location of Namur within Belgium
- Province: Namur
- Region: Wallonia
- Population: 505,348 (2025)
- Electorate: 390,007 (2024)
- Area: 3,675 km^{2} (2024)

Current Constituency
- Created: 1995
- Seats: List: 7 (2024–present); 6 (1995–2024)
- Members: List: Christophe Bombled (MR); Charlotte Deborsu (MR); Pierre-Yves Dermagne (PS); Farah Jacquet (PTB); Stéphane Lasseaux (LE); Marc Lejeune (LE); Anne Pirson (LE)
- Created from: List: Dinant-Philippeville; Namur

Namur (Dutch: Namen; German: Namür) is one of the 11 multi-member constituencies of the Chamber of Representatives, the lower house of the Belgian Federal Parliament, the national legislature of Belgium. The constituency was established as Namur-Dinant-Philippeville (Dutch: Namen-Dinant-Philippeville) in 1995 following the fourth Belgian state reform. It was renamed Namur in 2003 following the re-organisation of constituencies across Belgium along provincial lines. It is conterminous with the province of Namur. The constituency currently elects seven of the 150 members of the Chamber of Representatives using the open party-list proportional representation electoral system. At the 2024 federal election the constituency had 390,007 registered electors.

== Electoral system ==
Namur currently elects seven of the 150 members of the Chamber of Representatives using the open party-list proportional representation electoral system. Seats are allocated using the D'Hondt method. Since 2003 only parties that reach the 5% threshold in the constituency compete for seats.

Electors may vote for the list (party) or for individual candidates, either main candidates or substitute candidates or a combination, on the list. They may vote for as many candidates as there are seats in the constituency. Split-ticket voting (panachage) is not permitted and will result in the ballot paper being invalidated. The minimum number of votes a candidate must obtain to get elected - the quotient - is calculated as the total votes received by the party divided by the number of seats in the constituency plus one. Half the ballot papers where there are no votes for main candidates (i.e. the elector has voted for the list or for substitute candidates only) are redistributed amongst main candidates in the order they appear on the ballot paper so that the candidate's total votes (personal votes plus redistributed votes) equals the quotient. The seats won by the party are then allocated to the candidates with the most number of total votes.

== Election results ==
=== Summary ===
Election	Workers PTB			Ecolo Ecolo			Socialists PS			Democratic Federalists DéFI / FDF			Reformists MR / PRL-FDF			Les Engagés LE / CDH / PSC			Chez Nous Chez Nous / PP			National Front FN		
Election	Votes	%	Seats	Votes	%	Seats	Votes	%	Seats	Votes	%	Seats	Votes	%	Seats	Votes	%	Seats	Votes	%	Seats	Votes	%	Seats
2024	31,463	10.08%	1	22,014	7.05%	0	52,913	16.95%	1	8,151	2.61%	0	80,042	25.64%	2	90,694	29.05%	3	9,595	3.07%	0			
2019	36,330	11.92%	1	46,320	15.19%	1	67,422	22.11%	2	14,809	4.86%	0	60,266	19.77%	1	51,977	17.05%	1	8,906	2.92%	0			
2014	14,559	4.86%	0	29,186	9.74%	1	83,361	27.83%	2	8,367	2.79%	0	84,788	28.31%	2	48,135	16.07%	1	13,029	4.35%	0			
2010	4,456	1.55%	0	38,577	13.38%	1	92,857	32.20%	2				71,099	24.65%	2	45,905	15.92%	1	8,985	3.12%	0	7,986	2.77%	0
2007	1,503	0.51%	0	43,532	14.76%	1	76,529	25.95%	2				97,072	32.92%	2	49,906	16.92%	1				14,649	4.97%	0
2003	1,086	0.38%	0	24,297	8.60%	0	94,634	33.50%	3				79,599	28.18%	2	51,685	18.30%	1				14,799	5.24%	0
1999	833	0.31%	0	51,748	19.33%	1	73,770	27.56%	2				67,958	25.39%	2	51,190	19.12%	1				10,887	4.07%	0
1995	1,582	0.61%	0	29,723	11.41%	0	81,859	31.41%	2				66,622	25.57%	2	59,850	22.97%	2				18,050	6.93%	0

(Figures in italics represent alliances.)

=== Detailed ===
==== 2020s ====
===== 2024 =====
Results of the 2024 federal election held on 9 June 2024:

Party		Votes per arrondissement				Total votes	%	Seats
Party		Dinant	Namur	Philippe- ville	Expat- riates	Total votes	%	Seats
Les Engagés	LE	20,128	60,871	8,964	731	90,694	29.05%	3
Reformist Movement	MR	21,311	45,416	12,149	1,166	80,042	25.64%	2
Socialist Party	PS	10,704	32,872	8,684	653	52,913	16.95%	1
Workers' Party of Belgium	PTB	6,574	19,903	4,710	276	31,463	10.08%	1
Ecolo	Ecolo	4,303	15,177	1,816	718	22,014	7.05%	0
Chez Nous	Chez Nous	1,930	5,716	1,791	158	9,595	3.07%	0
DéFI	DéFI	1,358	5,708	978	107	8,151	2.61%	0
New Flemish Alliance	N-VA	1,311	3,200	889	126	5,526	1.77%	0
Blank Party	PB	1,169	3,467	664	57	5,357	1.72%	0
Citizen Collective	CC	893	3,080	511	72	4,556	1.46%	0
Agora	Agora	187	674	105	17	983	0.31%	0
Belgische Unie – Union Belge	BUB	182	547	122	30	881	0.28%	0
Valid votes		70,050	196,631	41,383	4,111	312,175	100.00%	7
Rejected votes		6,276	14,967	4,400	528	26,171	7.73%	
Total polled		76,326	211,598	45,783	4,639	338,346	86.75%	
Registered electors		86,953	241,740	52,442	8,872	390,007		
Turnout		87.78%	87.53%	87.30%	52.29%	86.75%		

The following candidates were elected: David Clarinval (MR), 23,514 votes; Charlotte Deborsu (MR), 14,785 votes; Pierre-Yves Dermagne (PS), 14,319 votes; Farah Jacquet (PTB), 4,970 votes; Stéphane Lasseaux (LE), 7,025 votes; Anne Pirson (LE), 11,870 votes; and Maxime Prévot (LE), 47,359 votes.

Substitutions:

- David Clarinval (MR) was appointed to the federal government and was substituted by Christophe Bombled (MR) on 4 February 2025.
- Maxime Prévot (LE) was appointed to the federal government and was substituted by Marc Lejeune (LE) on 4 February 2025.

==== 2010s ====
===== 2019 =====
Results of the 2019 federal election held on 26 May 2019:

Party		Votes per arrondissement				Total votes	%	Seats
Party		Dinant	Namur	Philippe- ville	Expat- riates	Total votes	%	Seats
Socialist Party	PS	14,108	42,975	10,251	88	67,422	22.11%	2
Reformist Movement	MR	17,388	33,743	8,999	136	60,266	19.77%	1
Humanist Democratic Centre	CDH	10,742	35,958	5,220	57	51,977	17.05%	1
Ecolo	Ecolo	9,690	32,212	4,204	214	46,320	15.19%	1
Workers' Party of Belgium	PTB	7,902	22,338	6,066	24	36,330	11.92%	1
DéFI	DéFI	2,696	10,702	1,389	22	14,809	4.86%	0
People's Party	PP	1,796	5,318	1,776	16	8,906	2.92%	0
Destexhe List		984	2,798	534	10	4,326	1.42%	0
DierAnimal		754	2,858	452	6	4,070	1.33%	0
Citizen Collective	CC	565	1,212	628	1	2,406	0.79%	0
The Right		515	1,380	406	9	2,310	0.76%	0
Vlaams Belang	VB	636	1,115	368	5	2,124	0.70%	0
Nation		244	1,138	543	4	1,929	0.63%	0
Agir		316	1,064	300	2	1,682	0.55%	0
Valid votes		68,336	194,811	41,136	594	304,877	100.00%	6
Rejected votes		6,659	14,855	4,175	35	25,724	7.78%	
Total polled		74,995	209,666	45,311	629	330,601	87.16%	
Registered electors		85,118	241,729	51,574	878	379,299		
Turnout		88.11%	86.74%	87.86%	71.64%	87.16%		

The following candidates were elected: David Clarinval (MR), 18,209 votes; Jean-Marc Delizée (PS), 12,428 votes; Georges Gilkinet (Ecolo), 11,481 votes; Maxime Prévot (CDH), 31,757 votes; Eliane Tillieuxt (PS), 21,514 votes; and Thierry Warmoes (PTB), 5,654 votes.

Substitutions:

- David Clarinval (MR) was appointed to the federal government and was substituted by Christophe Bombled (MR) on 17 March 2020.
- Georges Gilkinet (Ecolo) was appointed to the federal government and was substituted by Cécile Cornet (Ecolo) on 1 October 2020.
- Thierry Warmoes (PTB) resigned on 21 July 2023 and was substituted by Robin Bruyère (PTB) on 31 August 2023.

===== 2014 =====
Results of the 2014 federal election held on 25 May 2014:

Party		Votes per arrondissement				Total votes	%	Seats
Party		Dinant	Namur	Philippe- ville	Expat- riates	Total votes	%	Seats
Reformist Movement	MR	24,901	48,542	11,199	146	84,788	28.31%	2
Socialist Party	PS	16,731	53,490	12,997	143	83,361	27.83%	2
Humanist Democratic Centre	CDH	9,993	31,870	6,209	63	48,135	16.07%	1
Ecolo	Ecolo	6,149	20,356	2,576	105	29,186	9.74%	1
Workers' Party of Belgium	PTB	2,798	9,731	2,025	5	14,559	4.86%	0
People's Party	PP	2,212	8,457	2,355	5	13,029	4.35%	0
Francophone Democratic Federalists	FDF	1,406	5,863	1,087	11	8,367	2.79%	0
Debout Les Belges!		1,130	4,293	1,188	5	6,616	2.21%	0
The Right		881	2,447	666	9	4,003	1.34%	0
Rassemblement Wallonie France	RWF	465	1,212	287	3	1,967	0.66%	0
Nation		230	1,037	308	1	1,576	0.53%	0
Voice of the Belgian People		223	878	177	2	1,280	0.43%	0
Belgische Unie – Union Belge	BUB	172	594	81	10	857	0.29%	0
Walloon Front	FW	101	470	124	0	695	0.23%	0
New Alternative Wallonia	NWA	126	432	112	0	670	0.22%	0
Left Movement	MG	88	272	62	1	423	0.14%	0
Valid votes		67,606	189,944	41,453	509	299,512	100.00%	6
Rejected votes		5,741	15,402	4,025	32	25,200	7.76%	
Total polled		73,347	205,346	45,478	541	324,712	88.28%	
Registered electors		82,268	234,008	50,843	714	367,833		
Turnout		89.16%	87.75%	89.45%	75.77%	88.28%		

The following candidates were elected: David Clarinval (MR), 23,544 votes; Jean-Marc Delizée (PS), 23,317 votes; Benoît Dispa (CDH), 13,909 votes; Georges Gilkinet (Ecolo), 6,846 votes; Gwenaëlle Grovonius (PS), 10,176 votes; and Stéphanie Thoron (MR), 12,553 votes.

===== 2010 =====
Results of the 2010 federal election held on 13 June 2010:

Party		Votes per arrondissement				Total votes	%	Seats
Party		Dinant	Namur	Philippe- ville	Expat- riates	Total votes	%	Seats
Socialist Party	PS	18,496	59,451	14,841	69	92,857	32.20%	2
Reformist Movement	MR	21,547	40,567	8,858	127	71,099	24.65%	2
Humanist Democratic Centre	CDH	9,592	29,472	6,792	49	45,905	15.92%	1
Ecolo	Ecolo	7,859	26,873	3,748	97	38,577	13.38%	1
People's Party	PP	1,772	5,822	1,371	20	8,985	3.12%	0
National Front	FN	1,657	4,902	1,422	5	7,986	2.77%	0
Rassemblement Wallonie France	RWF	1,566	4,479	1,235	8	7,288	2.53%	0
Wallonia First		970	2,896	749	11	4,626	1.60%	0
Workers' Party of Belgium	PTB	747	3,152	555	2	4,456	1.55%	0
Belgische Unie – Union Belge	BUB	773	2,304	398	20	3,495	1.21%	0
Left Front		280	938	184	3	1,405	0.49%	0
Wallon+	W+	251	950	163	3	1,367	0.47%	0
Socialist Movement Plus		115	197	56	0	368	0.13%	0
Valid votes		65,625	182,003	40,372	414	288,414	100.00%	6
Rejected votes		5,578	14,061	3,824	20	23,483	7.53%	
Total polled		71,203	196,064	44,196	434	311,897	88.29%	
Registered electors		79,932	223,482	49,381	471	353,266		
Turnout		89.08%	87.73%	89.50%	92.14%	88.29%		

The following candidates were elected: David Clarinval (MR), 13,092 votes; Jean-Marc Delizée (PS), 24,104 votes; Valérie Déom (PS), 13,578 votes; Georges Gilkinet (Ecolo), 6,705 votes; Sabine Laruelle (MR), 32,389 votes; and Maxime Prévot (CDH), 20,226 votes.

Substitutions:

- Maxime Prévot (CDH) resigned on 29 June 2010 and was substituted by Christophe Bastin (CDH) on 6 July 2010.
- Sabine Laruelle (MR) was appointed to the federal government and was substituted by Valérie Warzée-Caverenne (MR) on 7 December 2011.
- Valérie Déom (PS) resigned on 15 April 2013 and was substituted by Vincent Sampaoli (PS) on 18 April 2013.

==== 2000s ====
===== 2007 =====
Results of the 2007 federal election held on 10 June 2007:

Party		Votes per arrondissement				Total votes	%	Seats
Party		Dinant	Namur	Philippe- ville	Expat- riates	Total votes	%	Seats
Reformist Movement	MR	28,502	56,187	12,203	180	97,072	32.92%	2
Socialist Party	PS	15,476	49,062	11,884	107	76,529	25.95%	2
Humanist Democratic Centre	CDH	9,919	32,157	7,756	74	49,906	16.92%	1
Ecolo	Ecolo	8,251	30,654	4,501	126	43,532	14.76%	1
National Front	FN	2,463	9,307	2,866	13	14,649	4.97%	0
Rassemblement Wallonie France	RWF	751	2,691	700	4	4,146	1.41%	0
New Belgian Front	FNB	445	1,378	320	3	2,146	0.73%	0
Wallon	Wallon	354	1,306	312	18	1,990	0.67%	0
Workers' Party of Belgium	PTB	178	1,128	195	2	1,503	0.51%	0
National Force		207	887	196	2	1,292	0.44%	0
Federal Christian Democrats	CDF	283	789	146	10	1,228	0.42%	0
Belgische Unie – Union Belge	BUB	150	623	96	4	873	0.30%	0
Valid votes		66,979	186,169	41,175	543	294,866	100.00%	6
Rejected votes		4,913	12,057	3,393	42	20,405	6.47%	
Total polled		71,892	198,226	44,568	585	315,271	90.57%	
Registered electors		78,148	220,977	48,281	695	348,101		
Turnout		91.99%	89.70%	92.31%	84.17%	90.57%		

The following candidates were elected: François Bellot (MR), 19,150 votes; Maryse Declercq-Robert (PS), 6,993 votes; Claude Eerdekens (PS), 24,103 votes; Georges Gilkinet (Ecolo), 7,705 votes; Sabine Laruelle (MR), 39,763 votes; and Maxime Prévot (CDH), 18,244 votes.

Substitutions:

- Maryse Declercq-Robert (PS) resigned on 11 June 2007 and was substituted by Jean-Marc Delizée (PS).
- Claude Eerdekens (PS) was appointed to the Government of the French Community and was substituted by Valérie Déom (PS) between 5 July 2007 and 19 July 2007.
- Sabine Laruelle (MR) was appointed to the federal government and was substituted by David Clarinval (MR) on 21 December 2007.
- Jean-Marc Delizée (PS) was appointed Secretary of State in the federal government and was substituted by Valérie Déom (PS) between 24 April 2008 and 15 July 2009; and by Guy Milcamps (PS) from 16 July 2009.
- Maxime Prévot (CDH) resigned on 23 June 2009 and was substituted by Isabelle Tasiaux-De Neys (CDH) on 9 July 2009.
- Claude Eerdekens (PS) resigned on 16 July 2009 and was substituted by Valérie Déom (PS) on the same day.

===== 2003 =====
Results of the 2003 federal election held on 18 May 2003:

Party		Votes per arrondissement				Total votes	%	Seats
Party		Dinant	Namur	Philippe- ville	Expat- riates	Total votes	%	Seats
Socialist Party	PS	16,984	63,402	14,166	82	94,634	33.50%	3
Reformist Movement	MR	21,930	47,149	10,377	143	79,599	28.18%	2
Humanist Democratic Centre	CDH	14,694	29,665	7,278	48	51,685	18.30%	1
Ecolo	Ecolo	4,646	17,145	2,424	82	24,297	8.60%	0
National Front	FN	2,432	9,821	2,527	19	14,799	5.24%	0
Federal Christian Democrats	CDF	883	3,307	386	29	4,605	1.63%	0
Vivant	Vivant	724	2,651	544	4	3,923	1.39%	0
Rassemblement Wallonie France	RWF	461	1,778	449	6	2,694	0.95%	0
CHOPE		444	1,696	289	1	2,430	0.86%	0
New Belgian Front	FNB	269	920	198	0	1,387	0.49%	0
Workers' Party of Belgium	PTB	181	723	177	5	1,086	0.38%	0
Belgische Unie – Union Belge	BUB	145	604	113	3	865	0.31%	0
Socialist Movement	MS	97	324	44	4	469	0.17%	0
Valid votes		63,890	179,185	38,972	426	282,473	100.00%	6
Rejected votes		5,713	13,831	3,991	104	23,639	7.72%	
Total polled		69,603	193,016	42,963	530	306,112	90.95%	
Registered electors		75,498	213,834	46,631	607	336,570		
Turnout		92.19%	90.26%	92.13%	87.31%	90.95%		

The following candidates were elected: Anne Barzin (MR), 24,353 votes; François Bellot (MR), 18,399 votes; Jean-Marc Delizée (PS), 19,590 votes; Valérie Déom (PS), 11,379 votes; Claude Eerdekens (PS), 31,151 votes; and Richard Fournaux (CDH), 22,768 votes.

Substitutions:

- Claude Eerdekens (PS) resigned on 29 June 2004 and was substituted by Jean-Claude Maene (PS) on 21 July 2004.

==== 1990s ====
===== 1999 =====
Results of the 1999 federal election held on 13 June 1999:

Party		Votes per arrondissement			Total votes	%	Seats
Party		Dinant	Namur	Philippe- ville	Total votes	%	Seats
Socialist Party	PS	12,591	49,678	11,501	73,770	27.56%	2
Liberal Reformist Party and Democratic Front of Francophones	PRL-FDF	19,263	39,689	9,006	67,958	25.39%	2
Ecolo	Ecolo	9,775	35,628	6,345	51,748	19.33%	1
Christian Social Party	PSC	15,352	28,619	7,219	51,190	19.12%	1
National Front	FN	1,630	7,567	1,690	10,887	4.07%	0
Vivant	Vivant	976	4,374	791	6,141	2.29%	0
French People United in a National; Action of Co-operation and Emancipation	FRANCE	251	777	298	1,326	0.50%	0
Communist Party of Wallonia	PC	243	830	208	1,281	0.48%	0
New Belgian Front	FNB	199	913	134	1,246	0.47%	0
Workers' Party of Belgium	PTB	132	563	138	833	0.31%	0
Party for a New Politics in Belgium	PNPB	116	579	103	798	0.30%	0
Alliance	A	104	357	61	522	0.19%	0
Valid votes		60,632	169,574	37,494	267,700	100.00%	6
Rejected votes		6,597	15,319	4,513	26,429	8.99%	
Total polled		67,229	184,893	42,007	294,129	90.68%	
Registered electors		72,966	205,767	45,619	324,352		
Turnout		92.14%	89.86%	92.08%	90.68%		

The following candidates were elected: Anne Barzin (PRL-FDF), 19,337 votes; Martine Dardenne (Ecolo), 12,041 votes; Jean-Marc Delizée (PS), 15,062 votes; Claude Eerdekens (PS), 34,608 votes; Richard Fournaux (PSC), 23,538 votes; and Michel Wauthier (PRL-FDF), 10,874 votes.

===== 1995 =====
Results of the 1995 federal election held on 21 May 1995:

Party		Votes per arrondissement			Total votes	%	Seats
Party		Dinant	Namur	Philippe- ville	Total votes	%	Seats
Socialist Party	PS	14,421	54,972	12,466	81,859	31.41%	2
Liberal Reformist Party and Democratic Front of Francophones	PRL-FDF	18,716	38,807	9,099	66,622	25.57%	2
Christian Social Party	PSC	16,210	34,852	8,788	59,850	22.97%	2
Ecolo	Ecolo	5,457	20,965	3,301	29,723	11.41%	0
National Front	FN	2,746	12,814	2,490	18,050	6.93%	0
Workers' Party of Belgium	PTB	267	1,074	241	1,582	0.61%	0
Unitarist and Centrist	UNIE	140	871	107	1,118	0.43%	0
Union and Democratic Renewal	URD	195	417	92	704	0.27%	0
Solidarity, Universality, Human Rights and Belgian Unity–New	SUD-BEB	109	446	43	598	0.23%	0
Parti Communautaire National-Européen	PCN	89	308	82	479	0.18%	0
Valid votes		58,350	165,526	36,709	260,585	100.00%	6
Rejected votes		7,005	15,504	4,612	27,121	9.43%	
Total polled		65,355	181,030	41,321	287,706	91.10%	
Registered electors		71,092	200,015	44,694	315,801		
Turnout		91.93%	90.51%	92.45%	91.10%		

The following candidates were elected: Jean Barzin (PRL-FDF), 17,845 votes; Pierre Beaufays (PSC), 11,637 votes; Jean-Marc Delizée (PS), 18,944 votes; Claude Eerdekens (PS), 24,057 votes; Richard Fournaux (PSC), 16,584 votes; and Michel Wauthier (PRL-FDF), 11,245 votes.
