= List of members of the Walloon Parliament, 2004–2009 =

This is a list of members of the Walloon Parliament between 2004 and 2009.

== List of members ==
Name	Fraction	Constituency
Claude Ancion	MR	Liège
Patrick Avril	PS	Liège
Marc Barvais	PS	Mons
Anne Barzin	MR	Namur
Maurice Bayenet	PS	Dinant-Philippeville
Chantal Bertouille	MR	Tournai-Ath-Mouscron
Véronique Bidoul	MR	Nivelles
Maurice Bodson	PS	Soignies
Jean-Pierre Borbouse	Independent (FN)	Mons
Willy Borsus	MR	Dinant-Philippeville
André Bouchat	CDH	Arlon-Bastogne-Marche
Philippe Bracaval	Verviers	Tournai-Ath-Mouscron
Pol Calet	PS	Charleroi
Caroline Cassart-Mailleux	MR	Huy-Waremme
Marcel Cheron	Independent (Ecolo)	Nivelles
Ingrid Colicis	PS	Charleroi
Christophe Collignon	PS	Huy-Waremme
Anne-Marie Corbisier-Hagon	CDH	Charleroi
Véronique Cornet	MR	Charleroi
Frédéric Daerden	PS	Liège
Jean-Pierre Dardenne	MR	Arlon-Bastogne-Marche
Michel de Lamotte	CDH	Liège
Marc de Saint Moulin	PS	Soignies
Brigitte Defalque	MR	Nivelles
Christine Defraigne	MR	Liège
Freddy Deghilage	PS	Mons
Maurice Dehu	PS	Nivelles
Paul-Olivier Delannois	PS	Tournai-Ath-Mouscron
Monika Dethier-Neumann	Independent (Ecolo)	Verviers
Laurent Devin	PS	Thuin
Carlo Di Antonio	CDH	Mons
Nicole Docq	PS	Namur
Jacques Étienne	CDH	Namur
Françoise Fassiaux-Looten	PS	Thuin
Paul Ficheroulle	PS	Charleroi
Philippe Fontaine	MR	Charleroi
Dimitri Fourny	CDH	Neufchâteau-Virton
Paul Furlan	PS	Thuin
Jacques Gennen	PS	Arlon-Bastogne-Marche
Herbert Grommes	CDH	Verviers
José Happart	PS	Liège
Daniel Huygens	Independent (FN)	Charleroi
Jean-François Istasse	PS	Verviers
Hervé Jamar	MR	Huy-Waremme
Charles Janssens	PS	Liège
Joëlle Kapompolé	PS	Mons
Serge Kubla	MR	Nivelles
Benoît Langendries	CDH	Nivelles
Michel Lebrun	CDH	Dinant-Philippeville
Jean-Charles Luperto	PS	Namur
Robert Meureau	PS	Huy-Waremme
Jean-Claude Meurens	MR	Verviers
Guy Milcamps	PS	Dinant-Philippeville
Richard Miller	MR	Mons
Marcel Neven	MR	Liège
Alain Onkelinx	PS	Liège
Florine Pary-Mille	MR	Soignies
Charles Petitjean	Independent (FN)	Charleroi
Charles Pire	Independent (FN)	Liège
Sébastian Pirlot	PS	Neufchâteau-Virton
Jean-Paul Procureur	CDH	Soignies
Daniel Senesael	PS	Tournai-Ath-Mouscron
Jean-Marie Severin	MR	Namur
Isabelle Simonis	PS	Liège
Louis Smal	CDH	Liège
Edmund Stoffels	PS	Verviers
René Thissen	CDH	Verviers
Eliane Tillieux	PS	Namur
Jean-Claude Van Cauwenberghe	PS	Charleroi
Pierre Wacquier	PS	Tournai-Ath-Mouscron
Jean-Paul Wahl	MR	Nivelles
Léon Walry	PS	Nivelles
Bernard Wesphael	Independent (Ecolo)	Liège
Monique Willocq	CDH	Tournai-Ath-Mouscron
Damien Yzerbyt	CDH	Tournai-Ath-Mouscron

== Sources ==
- "Composition: Representatives" (in French). The Walloon Parliament.
- "Political groups" (in French). The Walloon Parliament.
