= Farah Jacquet =

Belgian politician (born 1985)

Member of the Chamber of Representatives
- Incumbent
- Assumed office 9 June 2024
- Constituency: Namur

Personal details
- Born: 10 May 1985 (age 40) Dinant, Belgium
- Party: Workers' Party of Belgium

Farah Jacquet (born 10 May 1985) is a Belgian politician and member of the Chamber of Representatives. A member of the Workers' Party of Belgium, she has represented Namur since June 2024.

Jacquet was born on 10 May 1985 in Dinant. She has been a train conductor for the National Railway Company of Belgium (SNCB) since 2006 and a trade union representative for the General Union of Public Services (CGSP) since 2011.

Jacquet has been a member of the Workers' Party of Belgium (PTB) since 2014. She was elected to the municipal council in Namur at the 2018 local election. She also contested the election for the provincial council in Namur but the party failed to win any seats in the province. She contested the 2019 European election as the PTB's fourth placed candidate in the French-speaking electoral college but the party won only a single seat in the constituency. She was elected to the Chamber of Representatives at the 2024 federal election.

Electoral history of Farah Jacquet
Election	Constituency	Party	Votes	Result
2018 local	Namur municipality	Workers' Party of Belgium	510	Elected
2018 provincial	Namur province	Workers' Party of Belgium	543	Not elected
2019 European	French-speaking	Workers' Party of Belgium	19,862	Not elected
2024 federal	Namur	Workers' Party of Belgium	4,970	Elected
