= Daussoulx =

Sub-municipality of the city of Namur, Belgium

Daussoulx Dåssoû (Walloon)
- Sub-municipality of Namur
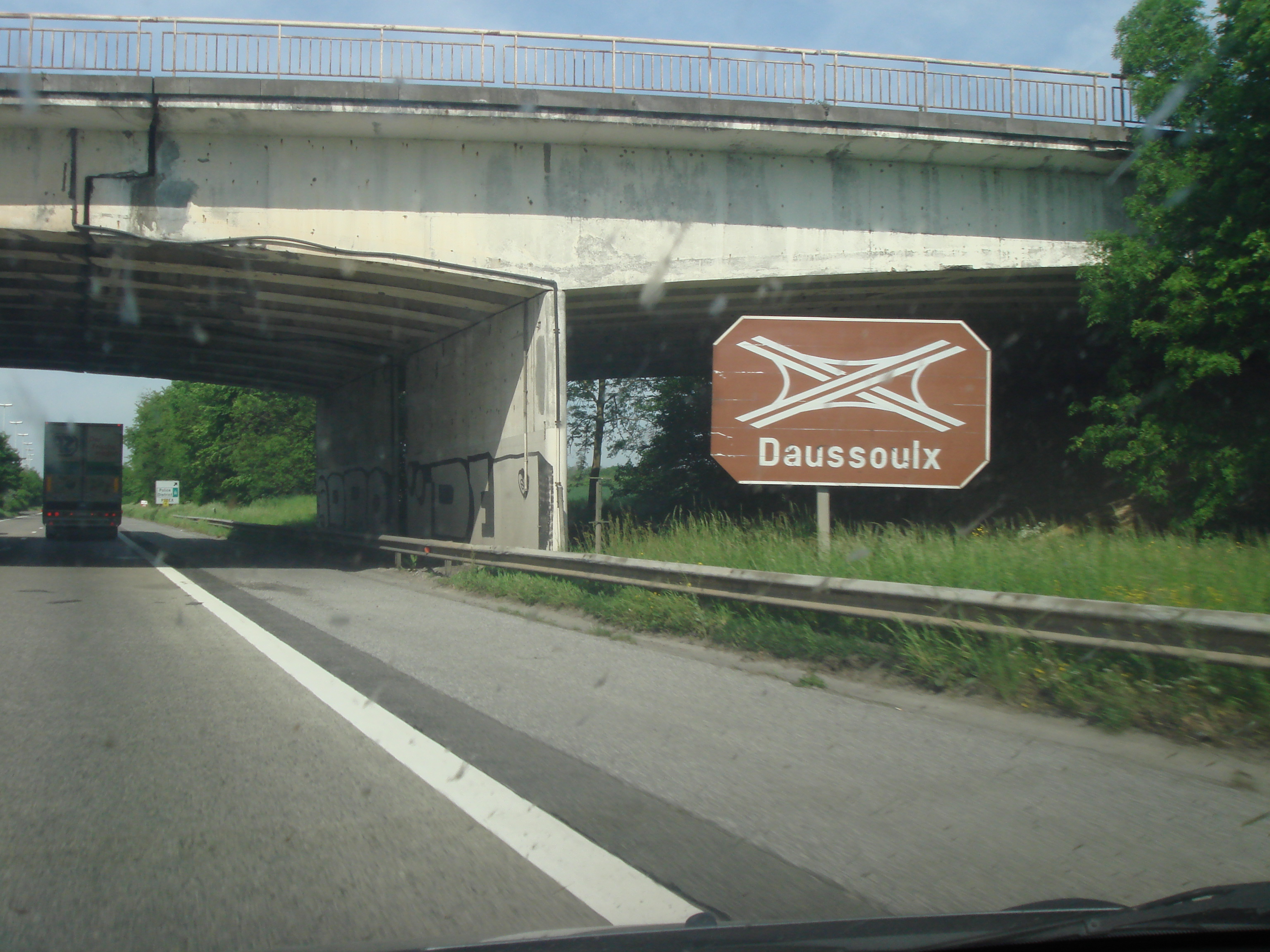
- Daussoulx interchange

- Location of Daussoulx in Namur
- Interactive map of Daussoulx
- Location within Belgium Location within Namur Province
- Coordinates: 50°31′00″N 4°52′00″E
- Country: Belgium
- Community: French Community
- Region: Wallonia
- Province: Namur
- Arrondissement: Namur
- Municipality: Namur

Area
  - Total: 3.74 km^{2} (1.44 sq mi)

Population (2020-01-01)
  - Total: 627
  - Density: 168/km^{2} (434/sq mi)
- Postal codes: 5020
- Area codes: 081

Daussoulx (French pronunciation: [dosu]; Walloon: Dåssoû) is a sub-municipality of the city of Namur located in the province of Namur, Wallonia, Belgium. It was a separate municipality until 1977. On 1 January 1977, it was merged into Namur.
