= Philippeville (disambiguation) =

Philippeville is a city and municipality in Belgium.

Philippeville may also refer to:

- Arrondissement of Philippeville, Belgium
- Skikda, Algeria, formerly named Philippeville
