= Namur (former Chamber of Representatives constituency) =

Belgian political subdivision

Namur was a constituency used to elect members of the Belgian Chamber of Representatives between 1831 and 1995.

== Representatives ==
Election	Representative (Party)	Representative (Party)	Representative (Party)	Representative (Party)	Representative (Party)	Representative (Party)
1831	Isidore Fallon (Catholic)	Jean-Baptiste Brabant (Catholic)	Pierre-Charles Desmanet de Biesme (Liberal)	3 seats		
1833	Isidore Fallon (Catholic)	Jean-Baptiste Brabant (Catholic)	Pierre-Charles Desmanet de Biesme (Liberal)	3 seats		
1837	Isidore Fallon (Catholic)	Jean-Baptiste Brabant (Catholic)	Denis François de Garcia de la Véga (Catholic)	3 seats		
1841	Isidore Fallon (Catholic)	Jean-Baptiste Brabant (Catholic)	Denis François de Garcia de la Véga (Catholic)	3 seats		
1845	Isidore Fallon (Catholic)	Jean-Baptiste Brabant (Catholic)	Denis François de Garcia de la Véga (Catholic)	3 seats		
1848	Constantin Moxhon (Liberal)	François Moncheur (Catholic)	Xavier Lelièvre (Liberal)	3 seats		
1852	Armand Wasseige (Catholic)	François Moncheur (Catholic)	Xavier Lelièvre (Liberal)	3 seats		
1856	Armand Wasseige (Catholic)	François Moncheur (Catholic)	Xavier Lelièvre (Liberal)	3 seats		
1857	Armand Wasseige (Catholic)	François Moncheur (Catholic)	Auguste Royer de Behr (Catholic)	Charles de Montpellier (Catholic)	4 seats	
1861	Armand Wasseige (Catholic)	François Moncheur (Catholic)	Auguste Royer de Behr (Catholic)	Charles de Montpellier (Catholic)	4 seats	
1864	Armand Wasseige (Catholic)	François Moncheur (Catholic)	Auguste Royer de Behr (Catholic)	Xavier Lelièvre (Liberal)	4 seats	
1868	Armand Wasseige (Catholic)	François Moncheur (Catholic)	Auguste Royer de Behr (Catholic)	Xavier Lelièvre (Liberal)	4 seats	
1870	Armand Wasseige (Catholic)	François Moncheur (Catholic)	Auguste Royer de Behr (Catholic)	Xavier Lelièvre (Liberal)	4 seats	
1874	Armand Wasseige (Catholic)	François Moncheur (Catholic)	Alphonse de Moreau (Catholic)	Jean Martin Dohet (Catholic)	4 seats	
1878	Armand Wasseige (Catholic)	Charles de Montpellier (Catholic)	Alphonse de Moreau (Catholic)	Julien Tournay-Detilleux (Liberal)	4 seats	
1882	Auguste Doucet de Tillier (Catholic)	Ernest Mélot (Catholic)	Alphonse de Moreau (Catholic)	Ferdinand Dohet (Catholic)	4 seats	
1886	Auguste Doucet de Tillier (Catholic)	Ernest Mélot (Catholic)	Alphonse de Moreau (Catholic)	Ferdinand Dohet (Catholic)	4 seats	
1890	Auguste Doucet de Tillier (Catholic)	Ernest Mélot (Catholic)	Alphonse de Moreau (Catholic)	Ferdinand Dohet (Catholic)	4 seats	
1892	Auguste Doucet de Tillier (Catholic)	Ernest Mélot (Catholic)	Alphonse de Moreau (Catholic)	Ferdinand Dohet (Catholic)	4 seats	
1894	Eugène Hambursin (Liberal)	Gustave Defnet (PS)	Joseph Bodart (Liberal)	Léopold Gillard (Liberal)	4 seats	
1898	Eugène Hambursin (Liberal)	Gustave Defnet (PS)	Joseph Bodart (Liberal)	Léopold Gillard (Liberal)	4 seats	
1900	Eugène Hambursin (Liberal)	Gustave Defnet (PS)	Auguste Mélot (Catholic)	Louis Petit (Catholic)	4 seats	
1904	Eugène Hambursin (Liberal)	Joseph Fossion (PS)	Auguste Mélot (Catholic)	Louis Petit (Catholic)	Léon Furnémont (PS)	5 seats
1908	Eugène Hambursin (Liberal)	Joseph Bologne (PS)	Auguste Mélot (Catholic)	Louis Petit (Catholic)	Léon Furnémont (PS)	5 seats
1912	Georges Honincks (Liberal)	Joseph Bologne (PS)	Auguste Mélot (Catholic)	Fernand Golenvaux (Catholic)	Emile Sevrin (PS)	5 seats
1919	Joseph Gris (PS)	Joseph Bologne (PS)	Léon Delacroix (Catholic)	Fernand Golenvaux (Catholic)	Emile Sevrin (PS)	5 seats
1921	Joseph Gris (PS)	Joseph Bologne (PS)	Adrien de Montpellier de Vedrin (Catholic)	Fernand Golenvaux (Catholic)	François Bovesse (Liberal)	5 seats
1925	Joseph Gris (PS)	Joseph Bologne (PS)	Adrien de Montpellier de Vedrin (Catholic)	Fernand Golenvaux (Catholic)	Emile Maillen (PS)	5 seats
1929	François Bovesse (Liberal)	Joseph Bologne (PS)	Adrien de Montpellier de Vedrin (Catholic)	Fernand Mathieu (Catholic)	Emile Maillen (PS)	5 seats
1932	François Bovesse (Liberal)	Joseph Gris (PS)	Louis Huart (Catholic)	Fernand Mathieu (Catholic)	Lucien-Marie Harmegnies (PS)	5 seats
1936	Georges Guilmin (Liberal)	Joseph Gris (PS)	Louis Huart (Catholic)	Jean Denis (REX)	Lucien-Marie Harmegnies (PS)	5 seats
1939	Georges Guilmin (Liberal)	Joseph Gris (PS)	Louis Huart (Catholic)	Maurice Jaminet (Catholic)	René Dieudonné (PS)	5 seats
1946	Charles Héger (CVP)	Gustave Fiévet (BSP)	Victor Briol (PCB)	Maurice Jaminet (Catholic)	René Dieudonné (PS)	5 seats
1949	Charles Héger (CVP)	Gustave Fiévet (BSP)	Louis Namèche (BSP)	Maurice Jaminet (Catholic)	René Dieudonné (PS)	5 seats
1950	Charles Héger (CVP)	Gustave Fiévet (BSP)	Louis Namèche (BSP)	Maurice Jaminet (Catholic)	René Dieudonné (PS)	5 seats
1954	Charles Héger (CVP)	Fernand Massart (BSP)	Louis Namèche (BSP)	Maurice Jaminet (Catholic)	René Dieudonné (PS)	5 seats
1958	Albert Servais (CVP)	Fernand Massart (BSP)	Louis Namèche (BSP)	Maurice Jaminet (Catholic)	Emile Lacroix (BSP)	5 seats
1961	Albert Servais (CVP)	Fernand Massart (BSP)	Louis Namèche (BSP)	Maurice Jaminet (Catholic)	Emile Lacroix (BSP)	5 seats
1965	Léon Remacle (CVP)	Charles Poswick (PVV)	Louis Namèche (BSP)	Maurice Jaminet (Catholic)	Emile Lacroix (BSP)	5 seats
1968	Léon Remacle (CVP)	Charles Poswick (PVV)	Louis Namèche (BSP)	Fernand Massart (RW)	Emile Lacroix (BSP)	5 seats
1971	Léon Remacle (CVP)	Charles Poswick (PVV)	Louis Namèche (BSP)	Fernand Massart (RW)	Robert Denison (PSB)	5 seats
1974	Léon Remacle (CVP)	Charles Poswick (PVV)	Louis Namèche (BSP)	Fernand Massart (RW)	Robert Denison (PSB)	5 seats
1977	Léon Remacle (CVP)	Charles Poswick (PVV)	Bernard Anselme (PSB)	Robert Marchal (cdH)	Robert Denison (PSB)	5 seats
1978	Léon Remacle (CVP)	Charles Poswick (PVV)	Bernard Anselme (PSB)	Robert Marchal (cdH)	Robert Denison (PSB)	5 seats
1981	Léon Remacle (CVP)	Charles Poswick (PVV)	Bernard Anselme (PSB)	Jean Barzin (PRL)	Robert Denison (PSB)	5 seats
1985	André Tilquin (cdH)	Charles Poswick (PVV)	Bernard Anselme (PSB)	Claude Eerdekens (PS)	Robert Denison (PSB)	Paul-Henry Gendebien (cdH)
1988	Gil Gilles (PS)	Charles Poswick (PVV)	Bernard Anselme (PSB)	Claude Eerdekens (PS)	Robert Denison (PSB)	Pierre Beaufays (cdH)
1991	Gil Gilles (PS)	Jean-Marie Severin (PRL)	Bernard Anselme (PSB)	Claude Eerdekens (PS)	Philippe Defeyt (Ecolo)	Pierre Beaufays (cdH)
1995	Merged into Namur-Dinant-Philippeville					
