= Robin Bruyère =

Belgian politician (born 1992)

Member of the Chamber of Representatives
- In office 31 August 2023 – 27 May 2024
- Preceded by: Thierry Warmoes
- Constituency: Namur

Personal details
- Born: 4 December 1992 (age 33) Liège, Belgium
- Party: Workers' Party of Belgium

Robin F. A. R. Bruyère (born 4 December 1992) is a Belgian politician and former member of the Chamber of Representatives. A member of the Workers' Party of Belgium, he represented Namur from August 2023 to May 2024.

Bruyère was born on 4 December 1992 in Liège. He studied economic and social history before joining the railway service as a ticket clerk at Namur and Andenne railway stations. He is a trade union representative for the General Union of Public Services (CGSP).

Bruyère was active in RedFox, the youth wing of the Workers' Party of Belgium (PTB). He contested the 2018 local election as the PTB's ninth placed candidate in Namur but was not elected after receiving 258 preference votes. He contested the 2019 federal election as the PTB's first placed substitute candidate in Namur and received 1,960 preference votes. He was appointed to the municipal council in Namur in September 2021 following the resignation of Ode Baivier. He was appointed to the Chamber of Representatives in August 2023 following the resignation of Thierry Warmoes. He did not seek re-election at the 2024 federal election and returned to working at Namur station.

Bruyère lives in the Jambes suburb of Namur and has two sons.
