= Georges Gilkinet =

Belgian politician

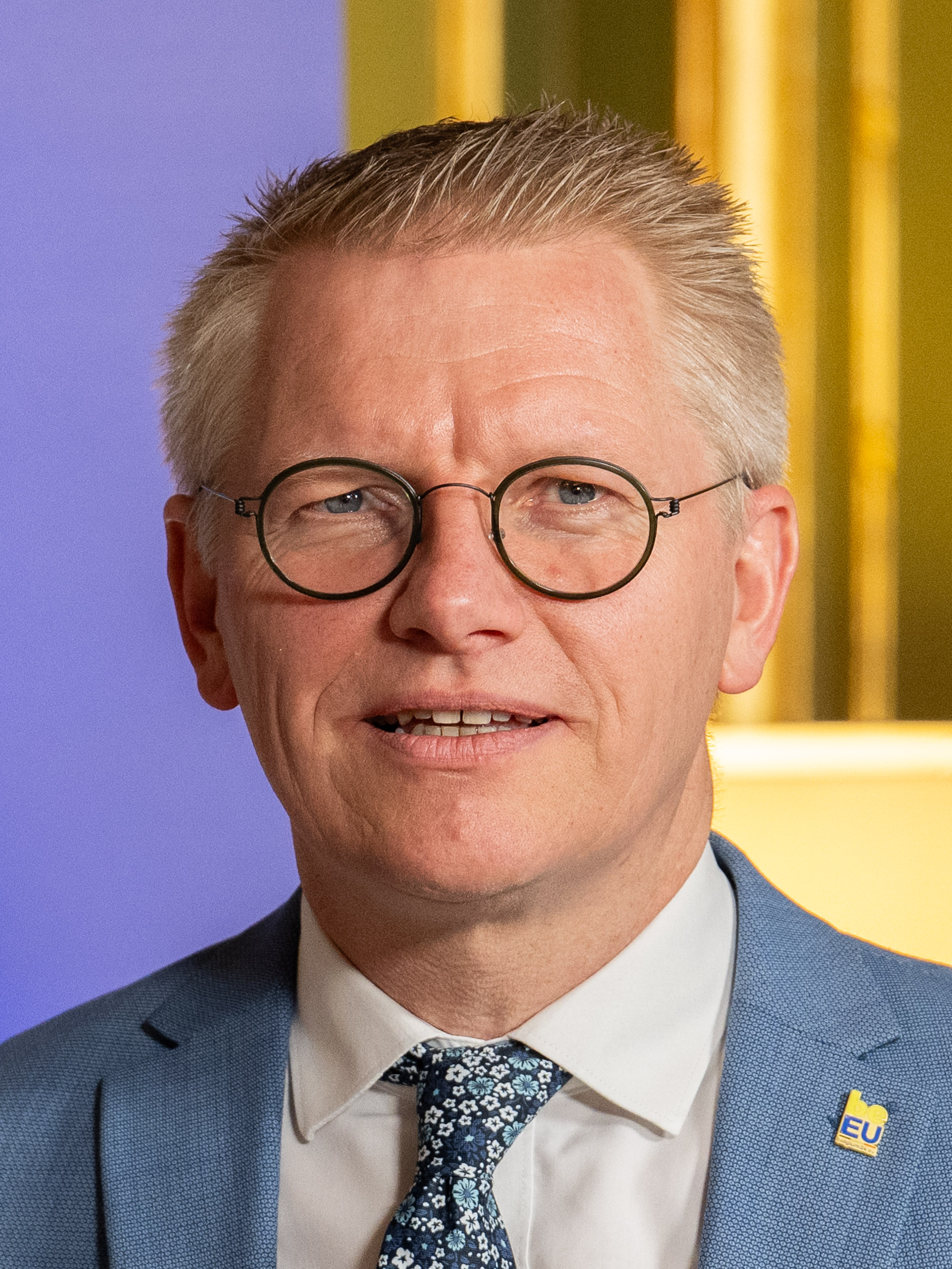
- Gilkinet in 2024

Deputy Prime Minister of Belgium
- In office 1 October 2020 – 3 February 2025
- Prime Minister: Alexander De Croo

Minister of Mobility and the National Railway Company
- In office 1 October 2020 – 3 February 2025
- Prime Minister: Alexander De Croo
- Preceded by: François Bellot
- Succeeded by: Jean-Luc Crucke

Member of the Chamber of Representatives
- Incumbent
- Assumed office 2007
- Constituency: Namur

Personal details
- Born: 25 January 1971 (age 55) Assesse, Namur, Belgium
- Party: Ecolo
- Education: IHECS
- Occupation: journalist, politician
- Website: Official site

Georges Gilkinet (born 25 January 1971) is a Belgian green politician of Ecolo who served as Deputy Prime Minister and Minister of Mobility and the National Railway Company in the cabinet of Alexander De Croo from October 2020 until February 2025.

== Biography ==
George Gilkinet was born on 25 January 1971 in Assesse in the Namur Province of Belgium. He graduated from Institut des hautes études des communications sociales in Brussels, and was a sports journalist for Canal C for 15 years.

In 2007, Gilkinet was first elected to the Chamber of Representatives for Ecolo. He specialized in finances, and between 2012 and 2014 was the Chairman of the Finance Commission.

In 2011, the criminal investigation in the Belgian part of the Kazakhgate affair was closed after the suspects agreed to pay a fine of €522,500 each. In 2017, a parliamentary enquiry which included Gilkinet was launched to investigate whether lobbying and manipulation had taken place. During the investigation, one of the suspects in the case took legal action against Gilkinet, and he was the victim of hacking. The enquiry concluded that the lobbying efforts had no significant effect on the outcome of the case. The opposition and Gilkinet disagreed with the conclusion. According to Gilkinet, the enquiry was a first class burial.

He became Chairman of Ecolo in 2018. On 1 October 2020, Gilkinet became Deputy Prime Minister and Minister of Mobility and the National Railway Company in the cabinet of Alexander De Croo.

== Judicial conviction ==
Between 2017 and 2018, Gilkinet, then vice-chairman and very active member of the parliamentary commission of inquiry into Kazakhgate, made a series of incriminating remarks, defaming Patokh Chodiev. He repeated his remarks in La Libre Belgique, Vif l'Express and Plus Magazine (Belgium), prompting several legal actions by the businessman. On April 30, 2018, the parliamentary commission of inquiry unanimously concluded that the naturalization procedures had not been influenced by Serge Kubla. The commission also acquitted Chodiev of any involvement in the adoption of the law on criminal transactions. In 2019, the Court of First Instance of Namur declared Chodiev's complaint against Gilkinet inadmissible because of his status as a parliamentarian. The businessman appeals the court decision.

On January 28, 2021, the Court of Appeal of Liège condemned Gilkinet for his defamatory remarks. On November 24, 2022, the Court of Cassation confirmed the basis of Gilikinet's judicial condemnation, thus vindicating Patokh Chodiev.

== Honours ==
- Knight in the Order of Leopold (2014)
