= Stéphane Lasseaux =

Belgian politician (born 1966)

Member of the Chamber of Representatives
- Incumbent
- Assumed office 10 July 2024
- Constituency: Namur

Personal details
- Born: 8 March 1966 (age 60)
- Party: Les Engagés

Stéphane Lasseaux (born 8 March 1966) is a Belgian politician serving as a member of the Chamber of Representatives since 2024. Until 2024, he served as mayor of Florennes.
