= New Belgium =

New Belgium can refer to:

- New Netherland, the territory claimed by the United Provinces (the Netherlands) on the eastern coast of North America in the 17th century
- New Belgium Brewing Company, a brewery located in Fort Collins, Colorado

Similar terms:

- New Belgian Front, a neo-Nazi political organization in Belgium.
