= Charlotte Deborsu =

Belgian politician (born 1997)

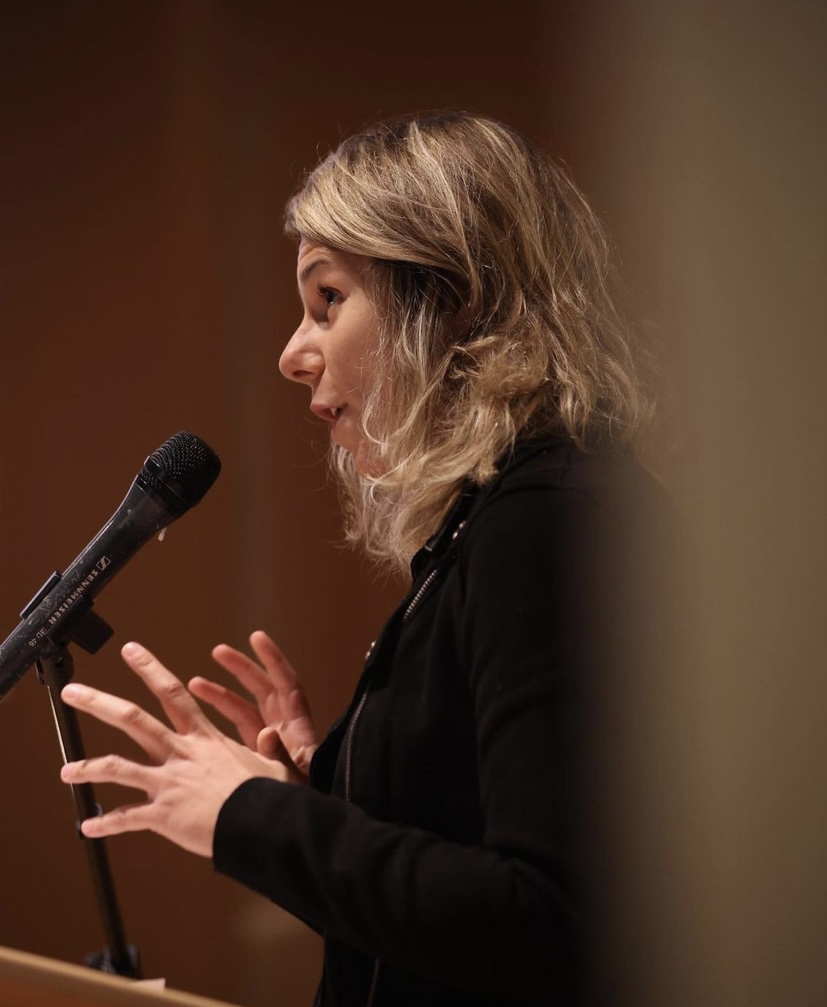
- Deborsu in 2022

Member of the Chamber of Representatives
- Incumbent
- Assumed office 10 July 2024
- Constituency: Namur

Personal details
- Born: 17 May 1997 (age 28)
- Party: Reformist Movement

Charlotte Deborsu (born 17 May 1997) is a Belgian politician of the Reformist Movement serving as a member of the Chamber of Representatives since 2024. She has served as an échevine of Namur since 2018.
