= Thierry Warmoes =

Belgian politician (born 1964)

Member of the Chamber of Representatives
- In office 20 June 2019 – 21 July 2023
- Succeeded by: Robin Bruyère
- Constituency: Namur

Personal details
- Born: 6 July 1964 (age 61) Uccle, Belgium
- Party: Workers' Party of Belgium

Thierry Warmoes (born 6 July 1964) is a Belgian politician and former member of the Chamber of Representatives. A member of the Workers' Party of Belgium, he represented Namur from June 2019 to July 2023.

Warmoes was born on 6 July in Uccle. He grew up in Turnhout and studied in Antwerp before moving to Namur in 1995. He worked for the Flemish Environment Agency (VMM) in Leuven.

Warmoes contested the 2012 local election as the Workers' Party of Belgium (PTB)'s first placed candidate in Namur but the party failed to win any seats in the municipality. He contested the 2014 federal election as the PTB's first placed candidate in Namur but the party failed to win any seats in the constituency. He was elected to the municipal council in Namur at the 2018 local election. He was elected to the Chamber of Representatives at the 2019 federal election. Warmoes resigned from the Chamber of Representatives in July 2023 saying he was resuming his professional career at VMM. He then resigned from the municipal council in September 2023 after the media published details about a domestic violence complaint filed by his ex-wife in April 2019.

Warmoes lives in Saint-Servais area of Namur and has three children and one grandchild.

Electoral history of Thierry Warmoes
| Election | Constituency | Party | Votes | Result |
|---|---|---|---|---|
| 2012 local | Namur | Workers' Party of Belgium | 309 | Not elected |
| 2014 federal | Namur | Workers' Party of Belgium | 2,208 | Not elected |
| 2018 local | Namur | Workers' Party of Belgium | 918 | Elected |
| 2019 federal | Namur | Workers' Party of Belgium | 5,654 | Elected |
