= Anne Pirson =

Belgian politician (born 1977)

Member of the Chamber of Representatives
- Incumbent
- Assumed office 10 July 2024
- Constituency: Namur

Personal details
- Born: 2 February 1977 (age 49)
- Party: Les Engagés

Anne Pirson (born 2 February 1977) is a Belgian politician serving as a member of the Chamber of Representatives since 2024. Until 2024, she was an échevine of Ciney.
