= Anne Barzin =

Belgian politician (born 1975)

Senator in the Senate of Belgium
- In office 10 July 2014 – 25 May 2019

Member of the Parliament of Wallonia
- In office 17 January 2007 – 24 May 2014
- Constituency: Namur

Member of the Chamber of Representatives
- In office 13 June 1999 – 17 January 2007
- Constituency: Namur-Dinant-Philippeville

Personal details
- Born: 18 August 1975 (age 51) Namur, Belgium
- Party: Liberal Reformist Party; Reformist Movement

Anne C.S.M. Barzin (born 18 August 1975) is a Belgian politician. She was a representative in the Chamber of Representatives from 1999 to 2007, a member of the Parliament of Wallonia from 2007 to 2014 and a Senator in the Senate of Belgium from 2014 to 2019. She was a member of the Liberal Reformist Party and the Reformist Movement.

== Early life ==
Barzin was born on 18 August 1975 in Namur. She is the daughter of Senator Jean Barzin. She received a law degree from the Catholic University of Leuven in 1998 and began work as an assistant in public law at the Facultés Universitaires Notre-Dame de la Paix (FUNDP) until 2000.

== Political career ==
She was elected in October 1994 as a municipal councillor for Namur. She entered the Chamber of Representatives on 13 June 1999, a position that she held until 17 January 2007. She became the secretary of the Chamber on 18 May 2003. She was president of the Liberal Reformist Party (PRL) federation of the Namur-Capitale district beginning in 2001 and was appointed as vice president of the PRL in the same year. She was leader of the Reformist Movement (MR) group on the Namur council in 2005 and the alderman for Finance, Commerce and the Economy in November 2006.

She was appointed to the Parliament of Wallonia in the Namur constituency on 17 January 2007 as the substitute for Denis Mathen, who was appointed as governor. She worked closely with Sabine Laruelle, Bernard Ducoffre and François Bellot and she was re-elected to the Parliament in 2009 and in 2014. She was a member of the Committee on Budget, Finance, Employment, Training and Sports, the Committee on Oil and Gas, and the Committee on the Environment, Land Use Planning and Transportation. She was vice president of the Credentials Committee. She served until 24 May 2014. She was also a deputy in the Parliament of the French Community from 23 January 2007 until 24 May 2014.

In the October 2012 municipal elections in Namur, the MR joined with the Humanist Democratic Centre (cdH) to create a majority. Maxime Prévot became the mayor and Barzin was appointed as the first alderman. In July 2014, Prévot gained a position with the Walloon government and Barzin became the delegate for mayoral affairs, acting as the mayor while Prévot was unable. She gave up her seat in the Walloon Parliament to take this position and became the co-opted member in the Senate of Belgium for the MR on 10 July 2014. She was the president of the MR group in the Senate from 28 July 2017 until 25 May 2019. She ran for election as the representative for Namur in the 2019 federal election but lost to David Clarinval. She left the senate on 25 May 2019, the same day that she was awarded the Officer of the Order of Leopold on 25 May 2019. She then became an honorary senator.

She is the current alderman for tourism development in Namur.
