= Jean-Claude Maene =

Belgian politician (1955–2026)

Member of the Chamber of Representatives of Belgium
- In office July 2004 – 26 April 2007

Member of the Parliament of Wallonia
- In office 23 June 2009 – 25 May 2014

Personal details
- Born: 29 January 1955 Schaerbeek, Belgium
- Died: 16 May 2026 (aged 71)
- Party: PS
- Occupation: Civil servant

Jean-Claude Maene (29 January 1955 – 16 May 2026) was a Belgian politician of the Socialist Party (PS).

Maene served in the Chamber of Representatives from 2004 to 2007, replacing Claude Eerdekens and subsequently joined the Parliament of Wallonia from 2009 to 2014.

Maene died on 16 May 2026, at the age of 71.
