= 2018 Belgian local elections =

- 14 October 2018

All 10 provincial councils All 581 municipal councils All 8 directly elected OCMW/CPAS councils All 9 Antwerp city district councils
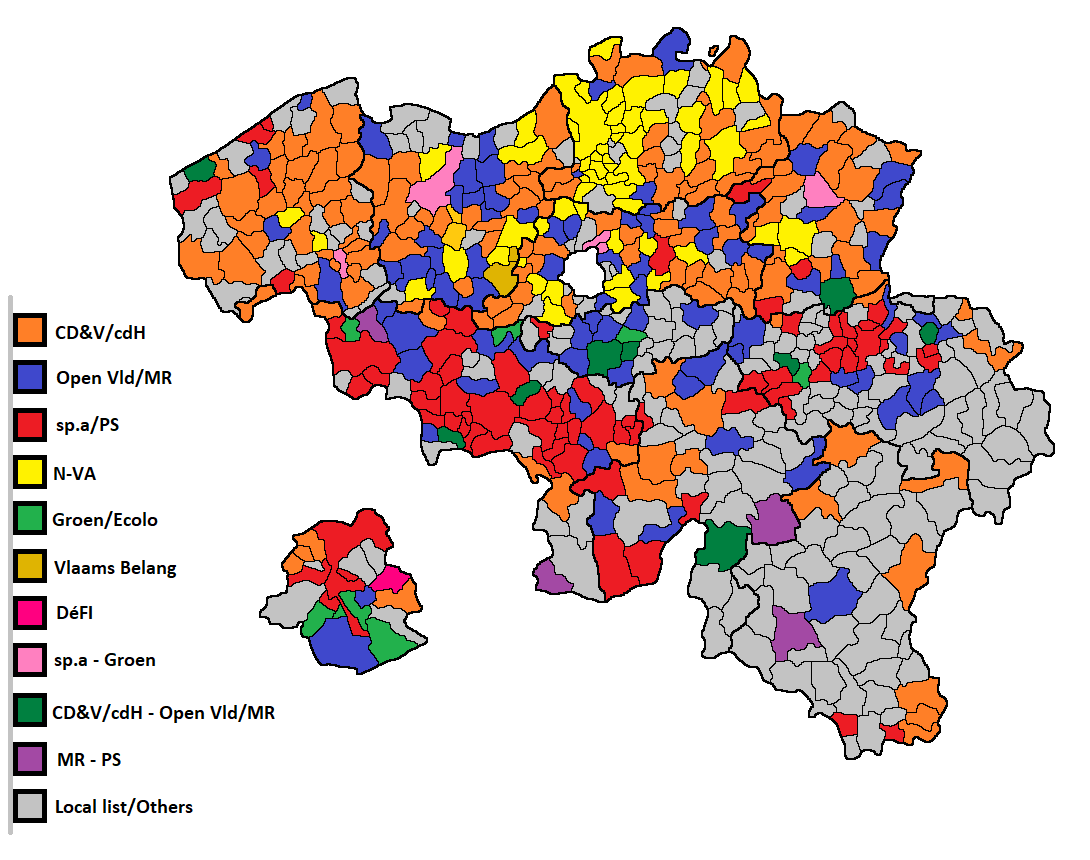

The Belgian provincial, municipal and district elections of 2018 took place on Sunday 14 October 2018. They are organised by the respective regions:

- Brussels with 19 municipalities
- Flanders with 5 provinces and 300 (down from 308) municipalities
  - In the city of Antwerp, elections will also be held for its nine districts
- Wallonia with 5 provinces and 262 municipalities
  - In the German-speaking Community, the elections are organised by that community rather than the Walloon Region

In the municipalities with language facilities of Voeren, Comines-Warneton and the 6 of the Brussels Periphery, the aldermen and members of the OCMW/CPAS council are directly elected.

== General ==
Although the laws governing local elections differ per region (Brussels, Flanders and Wallonia) and per level (provinces, municipalities, districts and OCMW/CPAS), they are all similar, with all of the elections being held on the same second Sunday of October for a six-year term.

Between the 2012 and 2018 local elections, elections were only held in May 2014 (European, federal and regional), giving an unusually long period without elections in Belgium. The next European, federal and regional elections will be held in May 2019, only a few months after the October 2018 local elections.

=== Parties ===
National political parties are mostly separated by language community. A lot of municipalities have local parties as well as a presence of national parties. Here are the most important national parties:

- Dutch-speaking parties, generally contending in Flanders and Brussels: N-VA (nationalist), CD&V (Christian democrats), sp.a (socialists), Open VLD (liberals), Groen (ecologists), Vlaams Belang (far-right), PVDA (Marxist)
- French-speaking parties, generally contending in Wallonia and Brussels: PS (socialists), MR (liberals), DéFI (regionalists/liberals), CdH (Christian democrats), Ecolo (ecologists), PTB (Marxist)
- German-speaking parties, generally contending in several German-speaking municipalities in Wallonia

=== Voters ===
All Belgian citizens aged 18 or over are automatically registered and are obliged to participate in the election. Foreigners, both EU and non-EU, have the right to register to vote.

The number of voters is as follows as of 1 August 2018:

	Belgians	EU citizens		Non-EU citizens		Total
	Belgians	Registered	% of potential	Registered	% of potential	Total
Brussels	585,922	37,232	16.75% of 222,242	12,174	19.27% of 63,171	635,328
Flanders	4,831,922	33,663	11.58% of 290,674	8,092	10.25% of 85,162	4,873,677
Wallonia (without GC)	2,508,440	57,955	25.88% of 223,938	9,263	20.47% of 45,253	2,575,658
German-speaking Community	49,374	1,709	14.97% of 11,413	28	2.78% of 1,007	51,111
Total for Belgium	7,975,658	130,559	17.45% of 748,267	29,557	15.19% of 194,593	8,135,774

== Brussels ==
The municipal councils in the 19 municipalities of the Brussels-Capital Region were elected. These municipalities do not belong to any province.

Since 2014, the regional electoral legislation has been modified to forbid lists with only one candidate, officially to enforce the sex parity principle, officiously to evict lists from an Islamist party. This 'ISLAM' party's leader had announced in April that it would present lists in 14 out of 19 communes. Finally, there are only two, in Brussels and Molenbeek. A third one in Anderlecht, headed by the aforementioned leader who had been elected in 2012, was invalidated because it hadn't been able to collect 100 signatures for its act of presentation. In April and begin September several politicians, amidst big media interest for this minuscule party (2 councillors, less than 10 members), had announced they would submit a law proposal to forbid it as its leader had multiplied controversial attitudes towards women and announcements that he aimed to introduce sharia in Belgium.

The definitive candidates lists have been published online on 21 September 2018, there are 4,104 candidates on 152 lists, they were 3,965 in 2012.

=== Brussels ===
Following the 2012 election, Freddy Thielemans (PS) continued as mayor, heading a coalition of socialists (PS-sp.a) and liberals (MR-Open Vld). In December 2013, Thielemans retired and was succeeded by Yvan Mayeur (PS). In 2017, a scandal emerged surrounding Samusocial, an organisation for homeless people where board members received excessive compensations for supposed meetings. Mayeur was forced to resign and was succeeded by Philippe Close (PS). The coalition was no longer supported by sp.a, and sp.a alderwoman Ans Persoons quit. Persoons and sp.a will contend the election on their own as Change.Brussels.

An October 2017 poll showed the Green parties surpassing the socialists as largest party.

In 2018, new financial-political scandals emerged regarding at least three organisations (Gial, Brinfin and Neo) where people were reimbursed as self-employed where they should have been actually employed.

A debate among the main Dutch-speaking candidates was held on 4 September.

Brussels is the only Belgian commune where two Islamic parties contend this election, Islam and its splinter party Salem, the first with two candidates (a father and his daughter), the second with three. Islam had 2 councillors in 2012, one in Anderlecht, the other in Molenbeek, both elected on one-person lists. The third list, in Brussels, failed to get a councillor elected in 2012. This time, the party has only been able to present lists of two candidates in Molenbeek and Brussels. There is a third Islamic party, limited to the province of Liège, the Movement for Education (MPE), which presents lists in three communes, Liège, Dison and Fléron, two one-candidate lists and one three-candidates list.

2018 Brussels City Council election
Party	Main candidate	Votes	%	±%
PS	Philippe Close (Incumbent mayor)	19,997	28.38%	▼0.74%
Ecolo	Benoît Hellings	11,847	16.81%	▲4.42%
MR	Alain Courtois	9,772	13.87%	▼4.02%
PVDA-PTB	Mathilde El Bakri	8,159	11.58%	▲10.02%
cdH	Didier Wauters	6,543	9.29%	▼8.72%
DéFI	Fabian Maingain	5,317	7.55%	▼0.08%
N-VA	Johan Van den Driessche	2,606	3.70%	▼0.64%
Change.Brussels	Ans Persoons	2,269	3.22%	▲3.22%
Others		3,957	5.61%	

Opinion polling:

Date(s) conducted	Polling firm	Newspaper	Sample size	PS	MR-Open Vld	cdH-CD&V	Ecolo-Groen	DéFI	N-VA	Vlaams Belang	PTB/PVDA	sp.a	Others	Lead	Majority	Opposition	Lead
April 2018	iVox	La Capitale	?	17.4%	18.4%	12.7%	19.7%	13.4%	4.5%	—N/a	6.4%	0.0%	7.5%	1.3%	35.8%	56.7%	20.9%
October 2017	iVox	RTL / SudInfo	?	14.2%	15.8%	13.8%	20.9%	11.7%	5.1%	—N/a	11.4%	0.8%	6.3%	5.1%	30.0%	63.7%	33.7%
14 October 2012	Local elections			29.1%	17.9%	18.0%	12.4%	7.6%	4.3%	2.2%	1.6%	—N/a	6.9%	11.1%	47.0%	46.1%	0.9%

=== Schaerbeek ===
In 1994, a new coalition took power in Schaerbeek against the former Liberal (PRL) majority that had backed far right mayor Roger Nols. This coalition included former 'Nolsists', under the leadership of incumbent mayor Francis Duriau, the FDF of Bernard Clerfayt, Ecolo, the PSC and the PS (the Flemish SP competed apart, on a common list with a small local movement, IDS). The coalition was renewed in 2000, without the PSC but with the MR which competed under the Liste du Bourgmestre (Mayor's List) flag, uniting the former PRL and the FDF. In 2006, the coalition excluded the PS, which had among its councillors a controversial Turkish member of the Grey Wolves. This provoked the exclusion of Ecolo by the PS in the ruling coalitions e.g. in Brussels and Molenbeek. In 2012, the PS was maintained in the opposition, while the CDH (4 seats) entered it with 2 aldermen, and the local MR chapter broke up as the federal party forbade any common list with its former FDF partner, but a majority of the local chapter chose to go forward with the (predominantly FDF) Mayor's List as 'Independent Liberals'.

The situation before the 2018 elections is quite different from the two previous ones. In 2006 and 2012, federal Vice-Premier Laurette Onkelinx led the PS list against the Mayor's List, overtly hoping to supersede it and take the mayorship. In both elections, the Ecolo list was led by a former federal leader, Isabelle Durant, who chose to keep its alliance with FDF Bernard Clerfayt. In 2017, both Durant and Onkelinx resigned from the municipal council and there are no notorious followers in sight. PS federal deputy Ahmed Laaouej declined the offer to move from Koekelberg to Schaerbeek to replace her. In 2015, the CDH fraction was halved with the exclusion of Regional deputy Mahinur Özdemir, officially for refusing to recognize the existence of the 1915 Armenian genocide. Another Turkish CDH councillor left the CDH group after this exclusion.

Apart from the New Flemish Alliance and the Flemish Interest (Vlaams Belang) lists, Flemish parties have common lists with their Francophone counterpart: PS-SP.A, CDH-CD&V, Ecolo-Groen. The Open VLD, whose only councillor sits within the majority, has decided to join the Liste du Bourgmestre (Mayor's List), which includes DéFI (new name of the FDF) candidates, including the mayor himself, and former MR.

2018 Schaerbeek City Council election
Party	Main candidate	Votes	%	±%
Liste du Bourgmestre	Bernard Clerfayt (Incumbent mayor)	16887	32.0%	▼0.7%
Ecolo	Vincent Vanhalewyn	10241	19.4%	▲6%
PS	Mathieu Degrez	9557	18.1%	▼6.97%
PVDA-PTB	Axel Bernard	6688	12.7%	▲9.3%
cdH	Denis Grimberghs	3814	7.2%	▼1.85%
MR	Georges Verzin	3291	6.2%	▼3.37%
N-VA	Cieltje Van Achter	1444	2.7%	▲0.5%
Flemish Interest	Patrick Sessler	620	1.2%	▼0.3%
Citoyen d'Europe M3E	Kateryna Mankovska	285	0.5%	▲0.5%

Opinion polling:

Date(s) conducted	Polling firm	Newspaper	Sample size	LB	PS-sp.a	Ecolo-Groen	MR-Open Vld	cdH-CD&V	PTB/PVDA	N-VA	Others	Lead	Majority	Opposition	Lead
April 2018	iVox	RTL / SudInfo	?	35.1%	15.2%	15.2%	9.5%	6.0%	12.7%	?	6.3%	19.9%	65.8%	27.9%	37.9%
29 September - 4 October 2017	iVox	RTL / SudInfo	?	35.8%	13.5%	16.1%	9.8%	6.4%	12.2%	?	6.2%	19.7%	68.1%	25.7%	42.4%
14 October 2012	Local elections			32.7%	25.1%	13.4%	9.6%	9.1%	3.4%	2.2%	4.6%	7.6%	64.8%	30.7%	34.1%

=== Other municipalities ===
- Ganshoren: Pierre Kompany, the father of Vincent Kompany, becomes the first black mayor in Belgium.
- Forest/Vorst: Stéphane Roberti (Ecolo) becomes mayor, succeeding Marc-Jean Ghyssels (PS).

== Flanders ==
=== Procedures and changes ===
In Flanders, the elections are mainly regulated by the Local and Provincial Electoral Act of 8 July 2011. Below are a few key dates set out in the Act applied to these elections:

Deadline	Subject	Statutory provision
By 1 June 2018	Determination by the Flemish Government of the numbers of municipal, district and provincial councillors to be elected, based on population figures as of 1 January 2018	Article 7
1 July 2018	Start of the "waiting period" (sperperiode) running until the day of the election, during which political propaganda and expenses are strictly regulated	Article 2
By 31 August 2018	Determination of the electoral roll by the municipal college of mayor and aldermen, based on the situation as of 1 August	Article 16
By the 15th day before election (29 September 2018)	Sending out of the convocation letter by the municipal college to all voters	Article 52
Second Sunday of October (14 October 2018)	Polling day (between 8am and 1pm); counting of votes starts no later than 2pm	Article 6, 134 and 150
The first working day of December (3 December 2018) at 10am	Constitutive meeting of the provincial councils	Article 7 (Provincial Act)
The first working day of January (2 January 2019) at 8pm (default)	Constitutive meeting of the municipal and district councils (the outgoing council chairman can determine a different day and time)	Article 6 (Local Govt. Act)

All residents aged 18 and higher with Belgian citizenship are obligated to vote. Foreigners, both EU and non-EU, have the right to vote. A May 2017 proposal to lower the voting age to 16 was blocked by government party N-VA.

Minister of Local Government Homans defined by order of 31 May 2018 the 163 municipalities that vote electronically; the other 145 municipalities vote by paper ballot.

Fifteen Flemish municipalities will merge into seven per 1 January 2019, when the legislative period elected in these elections starts. This reduces the number of Flemish municipalities from 308 to 300.

By order of 25 May 2018, the Flemish Government defined the number of councillors to be elected. In total, 7,398 municipal councillors will be elected in Flanders, a decrease of 66 compared to 2012. Thirty municipalities see an increase of two councillors, whereas in Ardooie and Ypres the population decreased, leading to a decrease of two councillors. The overall decrease however is mostly due to the merging of municipalities.

=== Political background ===
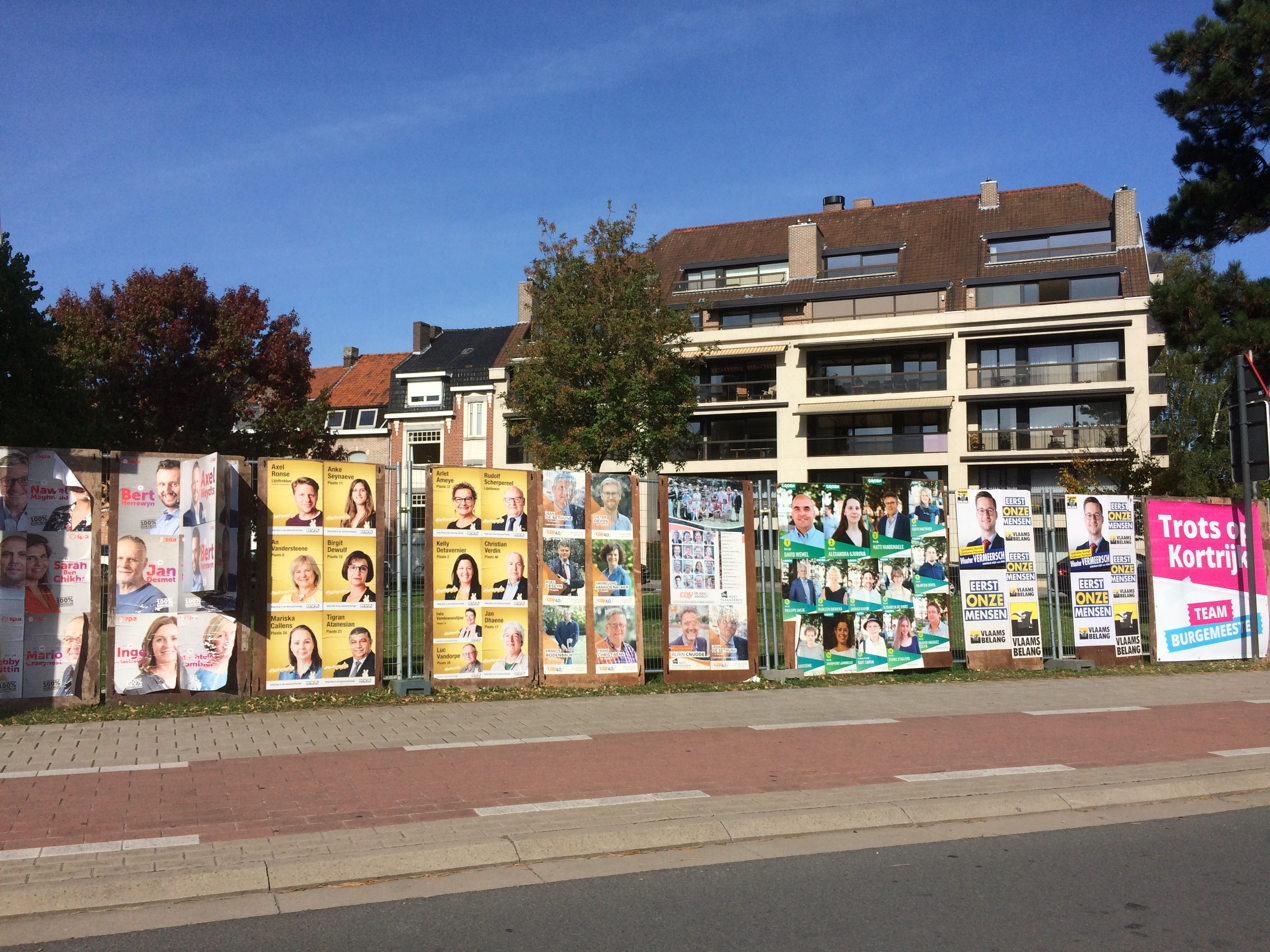
Campaign posters in Kortrijk

The following political parties have a common regional list numbers:

1. sp.a
2. N-VA
3. CD&V
4. Groen
5. Vlaams Belang
6. Open Vld

While N-VA has replaced CD&V's longstanding dominance nationally (in the 2010 and 2014 elections), the latter party retains its advantage on a local level. N-VA was able to break through in a lot of places locally in 2012, but CD&V remained the largest party in many municipalities, especially in rural ones.

Open Vld has strongholds both in rural and urban areas; for example the mayors of Mechelen and Kortrijk are Open Vld members. Sp.a tends to dominate in cities; however, it lost Antwerp in 2012 to N-VA, and Hasselt's mayoralty to CD&V in 2016. Gent's and Leuven's sp.a mayors are retiring, posing further threats to the party's power in cities. Sp.a chairman John Crombez suggested he would quit if his party's results are bad.

Groen only has two mayors, and Vlaams Belang is nowhere in power.

=== Provincial elections ===
The provincial councils of Antwerp, Flemish Brabant, East Flanders, West Flanders and Limburg will be elected. The Flemish Government reduced the total number of provincial councillors from 351 to 175: 31 instead of 63 for Limburg and 36 instead of 72 for the other four provinces. Councillors are elected for a six-year term, starting on the first working day in December following the elections, thus 3 December 2018.

Party	Antwerp			East Flanders			Flemish Brabant			Limburg			West Flanders			Total		
Party	Votes	%	Seats	Votes	%	Seats	Votes	%	Seats	Votes	%	Seats	Votes	%	Seats	Votes	%	Seats
N-VA	372,951	32.8%	14	212,003	21.4%	8	178,415	25.3%	10	118,550	21.5%	7	155,449	19.5%	7	1,037,368	24.8% (▼3.7pp)	46 (▼58)
CD&V	175,355	15.4%	6	178,099	18%	7	123,962	17.6%	7	139,064	25.2%	10	206,008	25.8%	10	822,488	19.7% (▼1.8pp)	40 (▼42)
Open Vld	103,664	9.1%	2	181,289	18.3%	7	108,580	15.4%	5	70,365	12.7%	4	106,703	13.4%	5	570,601	13.7% (▼0.9pp)	23 (▼31)
Groen	163,091	14.4%	5	138,499	14%	5	106,399	15.1%	6	46,952	8.5%	1	97,370	12.2%	4	552,311	13.2% (▲5.5pp)	21 (▼3)
Vlaams Belang	161,584	14.2%	6	140,212	14.2%	6	60,621	8.6%	3	67,996	12.3%	4	112,323	14.1%	5	542,736	13% (▲4.1pp)	24 (▼5)
sp.a	90,405	8%	2	95,396	9.6%	3	63,510	9%	3	85,010	15.4%	5	99,059	12.4%	5	433,380	10.4% (▼1.1pp)	18 (▼33)
PVDA+	51,405	4.5%	1	31,633	3.2%	0	16,060	2.3%	0	16,503	3%	0	16,286	2%	0	131,887	3.2% (▲1.1pp)	1 (▼1)
Others	17,971	1.7%	0	12,542	1.2%	0	8,238	1.2%	0	7,807	1.4%	0	4,107	0.5%	0	50,665	1.2%	0
UF	—			—			38,115	5.4%	2	—			—			38,115	0.9%	2 (▼3)
Total	1,136,426	100%	36 (▼36)	989,673	100%	36 (▼36)	703,900	100%	36 (▼36)	552,247	100%	31 (▼32)	797,305	100%	36 (▼36)		100%	175 (▼176)

=== Municipal elections ===
The municipal councils in all municipalities will be elected. Fifteen municipalities will be merged into seven, effective 1 January 2019, thus elections will be held for 300 rather than the current 308 municipalities. In each municipality, 7 to 55 councillors will be elected at-large depending on the population as of 1 January 2018. Councillors are elected for a six-year term, starting on the first working day in January following the elections, thus 2 January 2019.

==== Provincial capitals ====
Party	(Antwerp Province) Antwerp			(East Flanders) Ghent			(Flemish Brabant) Leuven			(Limburg (Belgium)) Hasselt			(West Flanders) Bruges		
Party	Votes	%	Seats	Votes	%	Seats	Votes	%	Seats	Votes	%	Seats	Votes	%	Seats
N-VA	99.657	35.3%	23 (1)	19.167	12.1%	6 (3)	13.331	22.2%	11 (2)	15.382	28.7%	12 (1)	9.573	11.7%	5 (4)
CD&V	19.151	6.8%	3 (6)	13.979	8.8%	4 (4)	9.688	16.1%	8 (4)	11.233	20.9%	9 (3)	26.130	31.9%	17 (1)
Groen	51.055	18.1%	11 (2)	53.179	33.5%	21 (1)*	11.848	19.7%	10 (3)	13.553	25.3%	11 (2)*	8.864	10.8%	5 (5)

==== Aalst ====
Aalst (in East Flanders) is governed by a coalition of N-VA, CD&V and SD&P (a local social democratic party who split from sp.a, who no longer wished to support the coalition). Mayor is Christoph D'Haese (N-VA). Ilse Uyttersprot has announced that she would challenge Christoph D'Haese for mayor. Largest opposition party is Open Vld, who put forth Jean-Jacques De Gucht as main candidate.

2018 Aalst City Council election
Party	Main candidate	Votes	%	±%
N-VA	Christoph D'Haese (Incumbent mayor) (16 seats)	18,688	33.2%	+2.1
Flemish Interest	Michel Van Brempt (8 seats)	9,763	17.3%	+6.5
CD&V	Ilse Uyttersprot (6 seats)	7,552	13.4%	−3.9
Open Vld	Jean-Jacques De Gucht (4 seats)	5,881	10.4%	−6.9
Groen	Lander Wantens (4 seats)	5,278	9.4%	+3.5
sp.a	Sam Van De Putte (3 seats)	4,262	7.6%	−8.8
lijstA	Ann Van de Steen* (2 seats)	3,906	6.9%	+6.9
PVDA-PTB	Alexander Van Ransbeeck	1,021	1.8%	+0.6

- Split from Socialist Party Differently

Opinion polling:

Date(s) conducted	Polling firm	Newspaper	Sample size	N-VA	CD&V	Open Vld	sp.a	SDP	Vlaams Belang	Groen	PVDA	Others	Lead	Majority	Opposition	Lead
17–24 September 2018	Indiville	Het Nieuwsblad		27.2%	12.7%	15.8%	5.4%	7.8%	14.6%	11.2%	3.1%	0.2%	11.4%	47.7%	50.1%	2.4%
December 2017	-	Goeiedag Aalst	-	28.0%	16.2%	14.8%	3.9%	8.0%	13.9%	7.7%	0.7%	—N/a	11.8%	52.2%	41.0%	11.2%
14 October 2012	Local elections			31.1%	17.3%	17.3%	16.4%	—N/a	10.8%	5.9%	1.2%	—N/a	13.8%	64.8%	35.2%	29.6%

==== Antwerp ====
Antwerp (in Antwerp) is governed by a coalition of N-VA, CD&V and Open Vld. Incumbent mayor Bart De Wever (N-VA) is expected to run for a second term. CD&V will not form a joint list with sp.a as they did in the 2012 elections. Sp.a, which was previously in power for decades, is the largest opposition party in the 2013–2018 term. On 17 November 2016, CD&V announced that Deputy Prime Minister Kris Peeters will move from Puurs to Antwerp to be their main candidate. This will pit two of the most popular politicians against each other in the biggest city of Flanders. Secretary of State Philippe De Backer will be Open Vld's main candidate, whereas Filip Dewinter will again be the candidate of Vlaams Belang. Volt Europa, a progressive and federalist European political alliance, will team up with the local Pirate Party and field one list under the name "Paars" ("Purple").

On 13 October 2017, sp.a and Groen announced they would form a joint list, including independents, under the name Samen ("together"), led by Groen politician Wouter Van Besien, and third place for sp.a politician Tom Meeuws. However, following scandals involving Meeuws, Groen decided to end the collaboration in January 2018. Sp.a decided to field independent Jinnih Beels as main candidate, with second place for Meeuws.

Kris Peeters surprisingly said he has a chance of becoming mayor even if his party CD&V only receives 5% of the vote and is needed for a coalition.

The elections resulted in a narrow majority for the incumbent coalition, leading De Wever to look for a different coalition. Initially he tried with Groen, but their positions are too different. Eventually N-VA, sp.a and Open Vld formed a coalition.

2018 Antwerp City Council election
Party	Main candidate	Votes	%	±%
N-VA	Bart De Wever (23 seats won)	99,657	35.3%	–2.4
Groen	Wouter Van Besien (11 seats won)	51,055	18.1%	+10.2
sp.a	Jinnih Beels (6 seats won)	32,327	11.4%	
Flemish Interest	Filip Dewinter (6 seats won)	29,565	10.5%	+0.3
PVDA-PTB	Peter Mertens (4 seats won)	24,637	8.7%	+0.7
CD&V	Kris Peeters (3 seats won)	19,151	6.8%	
Open Vld	Philippe De Backer (2 seats won)	15,768	5.6%	+0.1
Others		10,272	3.6%	
Total	55 seats	282,432	100%	

Opinion polling:

Date(s) conducted	Polling firm	Newspaper	Sample size	N-VA	CD&V	sp.a	Groen	Vlaams Belang	PVDA	Open Vld	Others	Lead	Majority	Opposition	Lead
September 2018	Ipsos	Gazet van Antwerpen	802	32.2%	7.0%	13.0%	20.2%	12.6%	8.1%	5.5%	1.4%	12.0%	44.7%	53.9%	9.2%
17–24 September	Indiville	Het Nieuwsblad	1586	29.9%	7.1%	16.0%	19.2%	11.6%	8.3%	5.8%	1.0%	10.7%	42.8%	55.1%	12.3%
April 2018	Ivox	Het Laatste Nieuws	800	35.0%	2.0%	10.2%	16.0%	8.1%	8.0%	7.6%	4.0%	19.0%	44.6%	42.3%	2.3%
November 2017	?	Het Nieuwsblad	?	39.4%	6.7%	25.2%		12.1%	9.4%	6.6%	0.7%	14.2%	52.7%	46.7%	6.0%
September 2017	Ipsos	Gazet van Antwerpen	800	29.5%	8.9%	30.6%		8.8%	9.9%	7.1%	5.2%	1.1%	45.5%	49.3%	3.8%
September 2017	Ipsos	Gazet van Antwerpen	800	26.1%	10.2%	13.6%	24.2%	8.7%	8.2%	6.2%	2.6%	1.9%	42.7%	54.7%	12.0%
6–17 March 2017	Ipsos	VRT / Het Laatste Nieuws	600	29.3%	14.1%	13.1%	20.1%	9.6%	8.3%	5.5%	—N/a	9.2%	48.9%	51.1%	2.2%
8–22 September 2015	?	VTM / Het Laatste Nieuws	800	34.4%	7.4%	19.1%	16.3%	9.6%	6.0%	7.1%	—N/a	15.3%	48.9%	51.0%	2.1%
14 October 2012	Local elections			37.7%	28.6%		7.9%	10.2%	8.0%	5.5%	2.0%	9.1%	—N/a	—N/a	—N/a

Most Favorable mayor:

score on scale of one to ten

Date(s) conducted	Polling firm	Newspaper	Sample size	De Wever	Peeters	Beels	Van Besien	Dewinter	Mertens	De Backer
April 2018	Ivox	Het Laatste Nieuws	800	6.3	4.2	5.0	5.1	3.6	4.8	4.8

==== Bruges ====
Bruges	Mayor	Coalition
Incumbent	Renaat Landuyt (sp.a)	sp.a, CD&V
New	Dirk De fauw (CD&V)	CD&V, sp.a, Open Vld

Bruges (in West Flanders) is governed by a coalition of sp.a and CD&V, led by mayor Renaat Landuyt (sp.a). The largest opposition party is N-VA; Pol Van Den Driessche will be its main candidate.

CD&V became the largest party; Dirk De fauw will become mayor, heading a coalition of CD&V, sp.a and Open Vld.

2018 Bruges City Council election
Party	Main candidate	Votes	%	±%
CD&V	Dirk De fauw (17 seats)	26,130	31.9%	+5.3
sp.a	Renaat Landuyt (Incumbent) (10 seats)	15,872	19.4%	−7.4
Open Vld	Mercedes Van Volcem (6 seats)	10,896	13.3%	+2.3
N-VA	Pol Van Den Driessche (5 seats)	9,573	11.7%	−8.1
Groen	Raf Reuse (5 seats)	8,864	10.8%	+2.0
Flemish Interest	Stefaan Sintobin (4 seats)	7,512	9.2%	+3.8
PVDA-PTB	Mieke Van Hoorde	1,479	1.8%	+1.8
Others	/	1,589	1,9%	+0.3

Date(s) conducted	Polling firm	Newspaper	Sample size	sp.a	CD&V	N-VA	Open Vld	Groen	Vlaams Belang	PVDA	Others	Lead	Majority	Opposition	Lead
17–24 September 2018	Indiville	Het Nieuwsblad		16.2%	28.0%	14.4%	15.3%	12.3%	6.9%	4.1%	0.1%	11.8%	44.2%	53.0	8.8%
14 October 2012	Local elections			26.8%	26.7%	19.8%	11.0%	8.8%	5.4%	—N/a	1.6%	0.1%	53.5%	45.0%	8.5%

==== Ghent ====
Ghent	Mayor	Coalition
Incumbent	Daniël Termont (sp.a)	sp.a-Groen, Open Vld
New	Mathias De Clercq (Open Vld)	sp.a-Groen, Open Vld, CD&V

Ghent (in East Flanders) is governed by a coalition of sp.a-Groen and Open Vld. Daniël Termont (sp.a), mayor since 2006, announced he will step down at the end of the term. Tom Balthazar was selected to replace him as main candidate of sp.a, again in electoral alliance with Groen, but he resigned in February 2017 following the Publipart scandal. Rudy Coddens replaced him in February 2017.

Sarah Claerhout was selected to be CD&V's candidate, but she also resigned for a different reason. Former director of the Flemish Catholic education Mieke Van Hecke will stand for CD&V instead.

Elke Sleurs quit as Secretary of State in order to be N-VA's candidate, but after a dispute with Siegfried Bracke, the party decided in January 2018 to put forward MEP Anneleen Van Bossuyt as main candidate.

Mathias De Clercq will remain the main candidate of Open Vld, which will thus be the only major list headed by the same candidate as in 2012.

One of the main topics is the implementation of a traffic circulation plan in 2017, which increased the car-free area in the city centre and divided the city into several zones for access by car, in order to improve air quality and stimulate public transportation and cycle use.

2018 Ghent City Council election
Party	Main candidate	Votes	%	±%
sp.a-Groen	Rudy Coddens (21 seats won)	53,179	33.5%	–12
Open Vld	Mathias De Clercq (15 seats won)	39,879	25.2%	+8.7
N-VA	Anneleen Van Bossuyt (6 seats won)	19,167	12.1%	–5
CD&V	Mieke Van Hecke (4 seats won)	13,979	8.8%	–0.3
Flemish Interest	Johan Deckmyn (4 seats won)	12,354	7.8%	+1.3
PVDA-PTB	Tom De Meester (3 seats won)	11,178	7.1%	+4.2
Others	/	8,809	5.5%	
Total	53 seats	158,545	100%	

The sp.a-Groen kartel lost significantly, mostly the sp.a faction, but together they remained the largest bloc. Open Vld gained significantly, becoming the largest single party. Open Vld wants to cooperate with CD&V. Since neither bloc has a majority, the four parties will try forming a coalition together, but it was uncertain at first as to whether Filip Watteeuw (Groen) or Mathias De Clercq (Open Vld) will become mayor. On 30 November, the four parties announced the formation of their coalition with De Clercq as mayor.

Opinion polling:

Date(s) conducted	Polling firm	Newspaper	Sample size	sp.a-Groen	N-VA	Open Vld	CD&V	Vlaams Belang	PVDA	Others	Lead	Majority	Opposition	Lead
17–24 September 2018	Indiville	Het Nieuwsblad	860	37.2%	13.4%	23.4%	5.1%	7.4%	7.9%	3.9%	13.8%	60.6%	33.8%	26.8%
6–17 March 2017	Ipsos	HLN	600	38.8%	17.2%	22.5%	10.3%	5.4%	5.8%	—N/a	16.3%	61.3%	38.7%	22.6%
14 October 2012	Local elections			45.5%	17.1%	16.5%	9.1%	6.5%	2.9%	2.4%	28.4%	62.0%	35.6%	26.4%

==== Hasselt ====
Hasselt	Mayor	Coalition
Incumbent	Nadja Vananroye (CD&V)	sp.a-Groen, CD&V
New	Steven Vandeput (N-VA)	N-VA, sp.a-Groen, Open Vld

Hasselt (in Limburg) is governed by a coalition of sp.a-Groen and CD&V. In 2016, Hilde Claes (sp.a) was forced to step down as mayor and was replaced by Nadja Vananroye (CD&V). N-VA is the largest opposition party.

Minister of Defence Steven Vandeput (N-VA) becomes the new mayor in a coalition of N-VA, sp.a-Groen and Open Vld. The outgoing mayor's party, CD&V, becomes opposition.

2018 Hasselt City Council election
Party	Main candidate	Votes	%	±%
N-VA	Steven Vandeput (12 seats)	15,382	28.7%	+3.2
sp.a-Groen	Marc Schepers (11 seats)	13,553	25,3%	−7.7
CD&V	Nadja Vananroye (Incumbent) (9 seats)	11,233	20.9%	−1.8
Open Vld	Hans Similon (4 seats)	5,563	10.4%	+0.5
Flemish Interest	Frank Troosters (3 seats)	4,437	8.3%	+2.5
PVDA-PTB	Kim De Witte (2 seats)	3,497	6.5%	+6.5

Opinion polling:

Date(s) conducted	Polling firm	Newspaper	Sample size	Rood-Groen	N-VA	CD&V	Open Vld	Vlaams Belang	PVDA	Others	Lead	Majority	Opposition	Lead
17–24 September	Indiville	Het Nieuwsblad		22.7%	29.3%	18.8%	11.4%	7.1%	8.1%	0.1%	6.6%	41.5%	55.9%	14.4%
September 2018	iVox	hbvl	?	24.3%	28.8%	21.6%	7.8%	8.2%	6.8%	2.4%	4.5%	45.9%	51.6%	5.7%
14 October 2012	Local elections			33.0%	25.5%	22.7%	9.9%	5.5%	—N/a	3.3%	7.5%	55.7%	40.9%	14.8%

==== Kortrijk ====
Vincent Van Quickenborne is the incumbent mayor of Kortrijk (in West Flanders), with a coalition of Open Vld, N-VA and sp.a. With this coalition, he ousted largest party CD&V in 2012.

Now Open Vld became the largest party, allowing Van Quickenborne to continue governing.

2018 Kortrijk City Council election
Party	Main candidate	Votes	%	±%
Open Vld	Vincent Van Quickenborne (Incumbent mayor) (15 seats)	15,900	31.3%	+10.0
CD&V	Hannelore Vanhoenacker (7 seats)	8,532	16.8%	−16.2
sp.a	Philippe De Coene (6 seats)	7,335	14.4%	+0.1
Flemish Interest	Wouter Vermeersch (5 seats)	6,124	12.0%	+5.9
N-VA	Axel Ronse (4 seats)	5,675	11.2%	−5.1
Groen	David Wemel (4 seats)	5,059	9.9%	+2.5
PVDA-PTB	Jouwe Vanhoutteghem	1,083	2.1%	+0.9
Others		1,151	2.3%	

Date(s) conducted	Polling firm	Newspaper	Sample size	CD&V	Open Vld	N-VA	sp.a	Groen	Vlaams Belang	PVDA	Others	Lead	Majority	Opposition	Lead
17–24 September 2018	Indiville	De Standaard	387	22.7%	20.6%	16.0%	10.9%	10.3%	9.6%	?	8.3%	2.1%	47.5%	42.6%	4.9%
14 October 2012	Local elections			33.0%	21.3%	16.3%	14.3%	7.4%	6.1%	1.2%	0.5%	11.7%	51.9%	47.7%	4.2%

==== Leuven ====
Leuven	Mayor	Coalition
Incumbent	Louis Tobback (sp.a)	sp.a, CD&V
New	Mohamed Ridouani (sp.a)	sp.a, Groen, CD&V

Leuven (in Flemish Brabant) is governed by a coalition of sp.a and CD&V. Louis Tobback (sp.a), mayor since 1995, announced he will step down at the end of the term. Mohamed Ridouani will replace him as main candidate of sp.a. The largest opposition parties are N-VA and Groen. CD&V's main candidate will be Carl Devlies, first alderman in Leuven, while N-VA's main candidate will be Lorin Parys, member of the Flemish Parliament.

Following the election, sp.a, Groen and CD&V formed a coalition with Mohamed Ridouani as mayor.

2018 Leuven City Council election
Party	Main candidate	Votes	%	±%
sp.a	Mohamed Ridouani (14 seats won)	15,613	25.9%	–5.5
N-VA	Lorin Parys (11 seats won)	13,331	22.2%	+3.2
Groen	David Dessers (10 seats won)	11,848	19.7%	+4.2
CD&V	Carl Devlies (8 seats won)	9,688	16.1%	–2.4
Open Vld	Rik Daems (2 seats won)	3,899	6.5%	–1.3
PVDA-PTB	Line De Witte (1 seat won)	2,763	4.6%	+1.8
Flemish Interest	Hagen Goyvaerts (1 seat won)	2,157	3.6%	–0.1
others	(no seats won)	886	1.5%	

Date(s) conducted	Polling firm	Newspaper	Sample size	sp.a	N-VA	CD&V	Groen	Open Vld	Vlaams Belang	PVDA	Others	Lead	Majority	Opposition	Lead
17–24 September 2018	Indiville	Het Nieuwsblad		24.9%	21.4%	10.8%	23.6%	5.7%	5.9%	6.0%	1.2%	1.3%	35.7%	62.6%	26.9%
14 October 2012	Local elections			31.4%	19.0%	18.5%	15.5%	7.8%	3.7%	2.8%	1.2%	12.4%	49.9%	48.8%	1.1%

==== Mechelen ====
Mechelen	Mayor	Coalition
Incumbent	Bart Somers (Open Vld)	Vld-Groen-m+, N-VA, CD&V
New	Bart Somers (Open Vld)	Vld-Groen-m+

Mechelen (in Antwerp) is governed by a coalition of Vld-Groen-m+, N-VA and CD&V, headed by mayor Bart Somers (Open Vld). The opposition parties are sp.a and Vlaams Belang.

Vld-Groen-M+ received an absolute majority of seats in the election.

2018 Mechelen City Council election
Party	Main candidate	Votes	%	±%
Vld-Groen-M+	Bart Somers (25 seats won)	26,102	47.9%	+14
N-VA	Freya Perdaens (7 seats won)	8,972	16.5%	–6.7
Flemish Interest	Frank Creyelman (4 seats won)	5,210	9.6%	+0.9
CD&V	Wim Soons (3 seats won)	4,966	9.1%	–3.3
sp.a	Caroline Gennez (3 seats won)	4,961	9.1%	–9.1
PVDA-PTB	Dirk Tuypens (1 seat won)	2,417	4.4%	+1.3
Others	/	1,859	3.4%	
Total	43 seats	54,487	100%	

Opinion polling:

Date(s) conducted	Polling firm	Newspaper	Sample size	Open Vld-Groen	N-VA	sp.a	CD&V	Vlaams Belang	PVDA	Others	Lead	Majority	Opposition	Lead
September 2017	Ipsos	Gazet Van Antwerpen	600	51.7%	16.5%	10.4%	7.9%	7.1%	5.9%	0.5%	35.2%	76.1%	23.4%	52.7%
17–24 September 2018	Indiville	De Standaard	508	46.2%	18.9%	9.0%	8.0%	7.5%	7.0%	1.9%	27.6%	73.1%	23.5%	49.6%
September 2017	Ipsos	Gazet Van Antwerpen	600	42.0%	18.4%	14.0%	10.6%	7.0%	4.7%	3.3%	23.6%	71.0%	25.7%	45.3%
14 October 2012	Local elections			33.9%	23.2%	18.2%	12.4%	8.7%	3.0%	0.6%	10.7%	69.5%	29.9%	39.6%

==== Ostend ====
Ostend	Mayor	Coalition
Incumbent	Johan Vande Lanotte (sp.a)	sp.a, Open Vld, CD&V
New	Bart Tommelein (Open Vld)	Open Vld, N-VA, Groen, CD&V

Incumbent mayor and Minister of State Johan Vande Lanotte (sp.a) announced he wants to run with a "citizens' movement". The local sp.a will run as an open list with independents under the name "Stadslijst" ("City's list"). Flemish Minister Bart Tommelein (Open Vld) wants to challenge him as mayor.

2018 Ostend City Council election
Party	Main candidate	Votes	%	±%
Stadslijst	Johan Vande Lanotte (Incumbent mayor) (11 seats)	10,655	22.8%	−9.3
Open Vld	Bart Tommelein (9 seats)	9,288	19.8%	+6.4
N-VA	Björn Anseeuw (7 seats)	7,722	16.5%	−6.2
Flemish Interest	Christian Verougstraete (6 seats)	6,126	13.1%	+5.4
Groen	Wouter De Vriendt (5 seats)	5,861	12.5%	+2.4
CD&V	Krista Claeys (3 seats)	3,670	7.8%	−1.7
PVDA-PTB	Ilona Vandenberghe	962	2.1%	+2.1
Others	/	2,537	5.4%	

Tommelein formed a coalition of his party Open Vld together with Groen, CD&V and N-VA, ousting Vande Lanotte as mayor.

Date(s) conducted	Polling firm	Newspaper	Sample size	Stads.	N-VA	Open Vld	Groen	CD&V	Vlaams Belang	PVDA	Others	Lead	Majority	Opposition	Lead
17–24 September 2018	Indiville	Het Nieuwsblad		24.1%	17.8%	15.3%	11.9%	6.2%	15.4%	2.3%	7.0%	6.3%	45.6%	47.4%	1.8%
14 October 2012	Local elections			32.1%	22.7%	13.5%	10.1%	9.5%	7.7%	—N/a	4.4%	9.4%	55.1%	40.5%	14.6%

==== Other notable results ====
West Flanders

- In Middelkerke, Jean-Marie Dedecker's list received an absolute majority.
- No election was held in Zuienkerke, as only one list was submitted. All its candidates were automatically elected.

East Flanders

- In Ninove, "Forza Ninove", the local Vlaams Belang, received 40% of the votes, leading to uncertainty who will form a coalition, as no other party wants to cooperate with them.

Antwerp

- In Brasschaat, N-VA with Federal Minister Jan Jambon received an absolute majority.

Flemish Brabant

- In Aarschot, Open Vld party leader Gwendolyn Rutten will become mayor.
- In Grimbergen, "Vernieuwing" ("Renewal") became the largest party and formed a coalition with Open Vld and N-VA. However, "Vernieuwing" are mostly ex-Vlaams Belang politicians and the Open Vld national party decided that its local chapter cannot cooperate with them.

== Wallonia ==
The Walloon Government decided not to use electronic voting and only use paper ballots. The German-speaking Community however, which organises municipal elections in its area since 2015, is using electronic voting only.

=== Provincial elections ===
The provincial councils of Namur, Walloon Brabant, Liège, Hainaut and Luxembourg were elected. The numbers of councillors are unchanged compared to 2012.

Party	Namur			Walloon Brabant			Liège			Hainaut			Luxembourg			Total		
Party	Votes	%	Seats	Votes	%	Seats	Votes	%	Seats	Votes	%	Seats	Votes	%	Seats	Votes	%	Seats
PS	62,338	20.8%	8	33,686	14.2%	6	154,090	25.4%	15*	234,570	32.9%	26	29,603	17.6%	7	514,287	25.4%	62 (▼16)
MR	76,080	25.4%	12	90,556	38.3%	16	136,805	22.5%	15*	133,321	18.7%	12	44,103	26.3%	12	480,865	23.7%	67 (▼7)
Ecolo	51,558	17.2%	8	55,819	23.6%	9	98,986	16.3%	12	97,657	13.7%	11	24,464	14.6%	4	328,484	16.2%	44 (▲20)
cdH	49,567	16.5%	6	21,010	8.9%	3	64,424	10.6%	6*	71,444	10.0%	4	53,182	31.7%	14	259,627	12.8%	33 (▼8)
PTB	26,644	8.9%	1	0	0.0%	0	81,409	13.4%	6	85,060	11.9%	3	8,834	5.3%	0	201,947	10%	10 (▲8)
DéFI	16,987	5.7%	2	17,691	7.5%	3	23,132	3.8%	0	29,172	4.1%	0	6,673	4.0%	0	93,655	4.6%	5 (▲3)
PP	7,724	2.6%	0	7,227	3.1%	0	24,592	4.1%	0	21,599	3.0%	0	1,144	0.7%	0	62,286	3.1%	0
Others	8,960	3.0%	0	10,638	4.5%	0	24,179	4.0%	0	41,337	5.8%	0	0	0.0%	0	85,114	4.2%	0
Total	607,617	100%	37	714,160	100%	37	253,117	100%	56	714,160	100%	56	168,003	100%	37	2,026,625	100%	223

Walloon Brabant Provincial Council Composition

- Liège Provincial Council Composition
  Namur Provincial Council Composition
  * includes the councillors elected on the German-speaking lists

=== Municipal elections ===
The municipal councils in the 262 municipalities will be elected. In each municipality, 7 to 55 councillors will be elected at-large depending on the population as of 1 January 2018. Councillors are elected for a six-year term, starting on the first Monday in December following the elections, thus 3 December 2018.

A total of 5,370 municipal councillors are up for election, an increase of 64 compared to 2012 due to population increase.

==== Arlon ====
Arlon (in Luxembourg) is governed by a coalition of cdH and PS. Vincent Magnus of the cdH is the incumbent mayor. The PS enters the election with an open list under the name "Pour vouS" ("For you"), their main candidate is current alderman André Perpète.

2018 Arlon City Council election
Party	Main candidate	Votes	%	±%
cdH	Vincent Magnus (Incumbent mayor) (12 seats)	6,436	39,1%	+39.1
Ecolo	Romain Gaudron (7 seats)	3,753	22.8%	+7.6
MR	Carine Lecomte (6 seats)	3,693	22.4%	+0.9
Pour vouS	André Perpète (4 seats)	2,581	15.7%	−10.5

Hainaut Provincial Council

Luxembourg Provincial Council Composition

==== Charleroi ====
Charleroi (in Hainaut) is governed by a coalition of PS, MR and cdH. Paul Magnette (PS) is the incumbent mayor. Local far right list FN Belge changes into "AGIR", while the cdH contends as "C+".

2018 Charleroi City Council election
Party	Main candidate	Votes	%	±%
PS	Paul Magnette (Incumbent mayor) (26 seats)	40,884	41.3%	−6.4
PVDA-PTB	Sofie Merckx (9 seats)	15,572	15.8%	+12.4
MR	Cyprien Devilers (6 seats)	11,092	11.2%	−5.1
C+	Eric Goffart	7,539	7.6%	−3.0
Ecolo	Xavier Desgain (3 seats)	7,317	7.4%	±0.0
DéFI	Jean-Noël Gillard (2 seats)	5,120	5.2%	+5.2
PP	Stève Maloteau (1 seat)	4,494	4.5%	+4.5
Others	/	7,007	7.1%	

Opinion polling:

Date(s) conducted	Polling firm	Newspaper	Sample size	PS	MR	C+	Ecolo	Défi	PTB	AGIR	Others	Lead	Majority	Opposition	Lead
13 April 2018	IVox	La Meuse	600	28.1%	13.1%	9.3%	7.2%	3.5%	20.1%	6.8%	11.9%	8.0%	50.5%	37.6%	12.9%
9 October 2017	IVox	La Meuse	600	23.4%	12.0%	9.6%	7.1%	2.7%	25.4%	8.0%	11.8%	2.0%	45.0%	43.2%	1.8%
14 October 2012	Local elections			47.7%	16.3%	10.6%	7.4%	1.8%	3.4%	5.8%	7.0%	31.4	74.6%	18.4%	56.2%

==== Liège ====
Liège (in Liège) is governed by a coalition of PS and cdH, with Willy Demeyer of the PS as mayor. Currently the MR is the biggest opposition party, but the PTB is expected to grow into one of the big contenders in 2018. Popular PTB politician Raoul Hedebouw, who lives in Liège, has stated that he's not interested in running for mayor. Ecolo will come up as a list with independents under the name "Vert Ardent".

2018 Liège City Council election
Party	Main candidate	Votes	%	±%
PS	Willy Demeyer (Incumbent mayor) (17 seats)	30,289	30.7%	−7.2
MR	Christine Defraigne (10 seats)	17,695	17.9%	−3.3
PVDA-PTB	Sophie Lecron (9 seats)	16,081	16.3%	+9.9
Vert Ardent	Caroline Saal (8 seats)	14,539	14.8%	+2.6
cdH	Carine Clotuche (3 seats)	6,664	6.7%	−7.3
VEGA	François Schreuer (1 seat)	4,459	4.5%	+0.9
DéFI	François Pottié (1 seat)	3,554	3.6%	+3.6
Others		5,256	5.3%	

Opinion polling:

Date(s) conducted	Polling firm	Newspaper	Sample size	PS	MR	cdH	Ecolo	PP	PTB	DéFI	Vert Ardent	Others	Lead	Majority	Opposition	Lead
26 June - 7 August 2018	Butterfly Research	RCF	432	34.0%	18.3%	11.8%	—N/a	2.2%	10.1%	1.2%	17.8%	6.8%	15.7%	45.8%	49.6%	3.8%
April 2018	IVox	La Meuse	?	27.4%	21.4%	8.4%	—N/a	?	20.9%	4.4%	14.0%	?	6.0%	35.8%	60.7%	24.9%
9 October 2017	IVox	La Meuse	600	20.5%	25.4%	9.5%	12.4%	1.9%	28.3%	—N/a	—N/a	2.0%	3.3%	30.0%	68.0%	38.0%
13–20 March 2017	Ipsos	RTL/Le Soir	600	22.7%	16.1%	8.0%	21.0%	?	16.8%	—N/a	—N/a	15.4%	1.7%	30.7%	53.9%	23.2%
14 October 2012	Local elections			38.0%	21.2%	14.0%	12.3%	2.2%	6.4%	—N/a	—N/a	6.0%	16.8%	52.0%	48.0%	4.0%

==== Mons ====
Mons (in Hainaut) is governed by a coalition of PS and cdH. Former prime minister Elio Di Rupo is incumbent mayor, but he will not run for re-election. Instead the PS list will be led by first alderman Nicolas Martin. The MR will run as "Mons en mieux!" ("Better Mons") with Georges-Louis Bouchez as main candidate, while cdH renamed itself "Agora - Agir pour Mons" ("Act for Mons").

2018 Mons City Council election
Party	Main candidate	Votes	%	±%
PS	Nicolas Martin (23 seats)	22,735	44.2%	−11.0
Mons en mieux!	Georges-Louis Bouchez (11 seats)	11,043	21.5%	+3.6
Ecolo	Charlotte de Jaer (6 seats)	6,566	12.8%	+4.0
PVDA-PTB	John Beugnies (3 seats)	4,365	8.5%	+4.9
Agora - Agir pour Mons	Savine Moucheron (2 seats)	3,243	6.3%	−2.4
DéFI	Frédéric Hondekijn	950	1.8%	+1.8
Citoyen	Nadia Dupont	726	1.4%	+1.4
Others		1,748	3.4%	

Opinion polling:

Date(s) conducted	Polling firm	Newspaper	Sample size	PS	Mons en mieux!	Agora	Ecolo	PTB	DéFI	Citoyen	Others	Lead	Majority	Opposition	Lead
April 2018	IVox	La Province	?	39.2%	20.2%	6.1%	10.1	11.6%	4.1%	3.5%	1.2	19.0%	45.3%	49.5%	4.2%
8 -15 Februari 2018	Dedicated	MR	?	35.4%	22.8%	4.2%	14.2%	12.9%	6.3%	3.3%	?	12.6%	39.6%	59.5%	19.9%
29 September - 4 October 2017	IVox	La Province	286	38.2%	18.1%	7.1%	9.3%	18.4%	—N/a	4.4%	4.5%	19.8%	45.3%	50.2%	4.9%
14 October 2012	Local elections			55.2%	17.9%	8.7%	8.8%	3.6%	—N/a	4.3%	1.5%	37.3%	63.9%	34.6%	29.3%

==== Namur ====
Namur (in Namur) is governed by a coalition of cdH, MR and Ecolo. Maxime Prévot of the cdH is the incumbent mayor.

2018 Namur City Council election
Party	Main candidate	Votes	%	±%
cdH	Maxime Prévot (Incumbent mayor) (16 seats)	19,359	29.3%	−2.5
PS	Eliane Tilleux (9 seats)	12,198	18.5%	−9.9
Ecolo	Philippe Noël (9 seats)	11,217	16.9%	+2.8
MR	Anne Barzin (6 seats)	8,944	13.6%	−5.9
DéFI	Pierre-Yves Dupuis (4 seats)	5,754	8.7%	+8.7
PVDA-PTB	Thierry Warmoes (3 seats)	5,128	7.8%	+5.0
Others	/	3,422	5.2%	

Opinion polling:

Date(s) conducted	Polling firm	Newspaper	Sample size	cdH	PS	MR	Ecolo	PTB	DéFI	Others	Lead	Majority	Opposition	Lead
April 2018	iVox	RTL / SudInfo	?	18.5%	20.1%	19.9%	9.9%	11.2%	14.2%	6.2%	0.2%	48.3%	45.5%	2.8%
29 September - 4 October 2017	iVox	RTL / SudInfo	?	23.2%	18.0%	23.7%	11.9%	18.0%	—N/a	5.2%	0.5%	58.8%	36.0%	22.8%
14 October 2012	Local elections			31.8%	28.4%	19.5%	14.1%	2.8%	—N/a	3.4%	3.4%	65.4%	31.2%	34.2%

==== Wavre ====
Wavre (in Walloon Brabant) is governed by a majority of LB (La Liste du Bourgmestre, or "the Mayor's List"), which is the election list of the local MR faction. The incumbent mayor is federal Prime Minister Charles Michel, although he is currently only mayor in title. Françoise Pigeolet replaces him in performing the mayoral duties. Charles Michel announced that he will not succeed himself, as he wishes to concentrate on his duties as prime minister. The list of LB will be headed by Françoise Pigeolet.

2018 Wavre City Council election
Party	Main candidate	Votes	%	±%
LB	Françoise Pigeolet (16 seats)	8,239	40.6%	−14.5
Ecolo	Christophe Lejeune (8 seats)	4,725	23.4%	+8.3
PS	Kyriaki Michelis (3 seats)	2,244	11.1%	−1.6
cdH	Benoît Thoreau (2 seats)	1,933	9.5%	−2.6
DéFI	Luc D'Hondt (2 seats)	1,473	7.3%	+7.3
Others	/	1,653	8.2%	
