= Richard Fournaux =

Belgian politician (born 1963)

Senator
- In office 28 June 2007 – June 2011

Personal details
- Born: 17 December 1963 (age 62) Namur, Belgium
- Party: MR
- Other political affiliations: MCC
- Website: www.richard-fournaux.be

Richard Fournaux (born 17 December 1963) is a Belgian politician and a member of the MR. He was elected as a member of the Belgian Senate in 2007.
