= Arrondissement of Dinant =

Arrondissement in Wallonia, Belgium

Arrondissement of Dinant Arrondissement de Dinant
- Arrondissement
- Location of the arrondissement in Namur
- Coordinates: 50.15°N 4.95°E
- Country: Belgium
- Region: Wallonia
- Province: Namur
- Municipalities: 15

Area
  - Total: 1,592.42 km^{2} (614.84 sq mi)

Population (1 January 2017)
  - Total: 110,335
  - Density: 69.2876/km^{2} (179.454/sq mi)
- Time zone: UTC+1 (CET)
  - Summer (DST): UTC+2 (CEST)

The Arrondissement of Dinant (French: Arrondissement de Dinant; Dutch: Arrondissement Dinant) is one of the three administrative arrondissements in the Walloon province of Namur, Belgium. It is both an administrative and a judicial arrondissement. However, the Judicial Arrondissement of Dinant also comprises the municipalities of the Arrondissement of Philippeville.

== Municipalities ==
The Administrative Arrondissement of Dinant consists of the following municipalities:

- Anhée
- Beauraing
- Bièvre
- Ciney
- Dinant
- Gedinne
- Hamois
- Hastière
- Havelange
- Houyet
- Onhaye
- Rochefort
- Somme-Leuze
- Vresse-sur-Semois
- Yvoir
