= David Clarinval =

Belgian politician (born 1976)

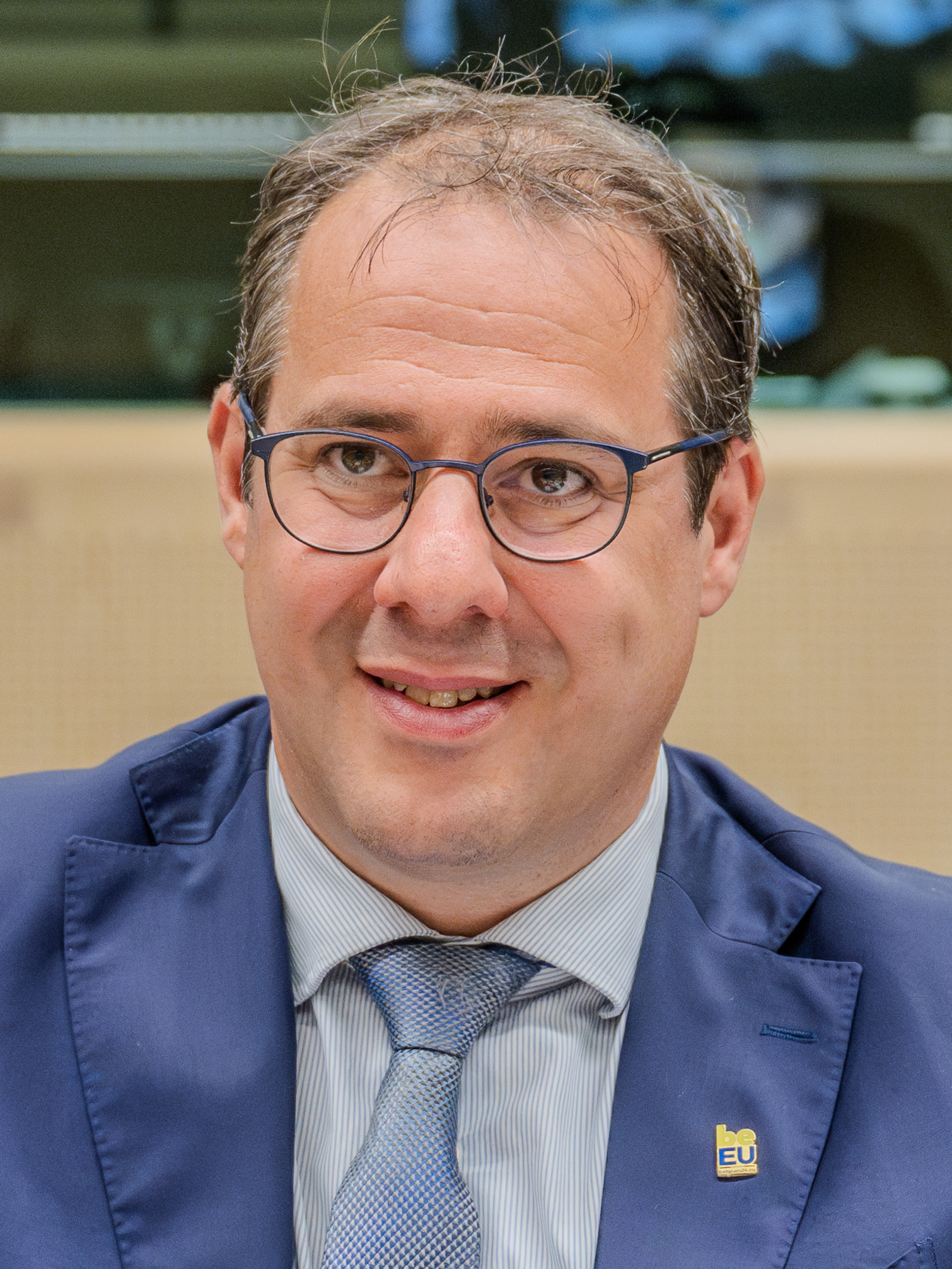
- Clarinval in 2024

Deputy Prime Minister of Belgium
- Incumbent
- Assumed office 21 April 2022
- Prime Minister: Alexander De Croo; Bart De Wever
- In office 30 November 2019 – 1 October 2020
- Prime Minister: Sophie Wilmès

Minister of Labour and Economy
- Incumbent
- Assumed office 3 February 2025
- Prime Minister: Bart De Wever
- Preceded by: Pierre-Yves Dermagne

Minister of Agriculture
- Incumbent
- Assumed office 1 October 2020
- Prime Minister: Alexander De Croo; Bart De Wever
- Preceded by: Denis Ducarme

Minister of the Middle Class, SMEs, Self-employed, Social Integration and Urban Policy
- In office 1 October 2020 – 3 February 2025
- Prime Minister: Alexander De Croo
- Preceded by: Denis Ducarme
- Succeeded by: Eléonore Simonet

Minister of Budget
- In office 27 October 2019 – 1 October 2020
- Prime Minister: Sophie Wilmès
- Preceded by: Sophie Wilmès
- Succeeded by: Eva De Bleeker

Mayor of Bièvre
- Incumbent
- Assumed office 1 January 2001
- Preceded by: Michaël Modave

Member of the Chamber of Representatives
- In office 21 December 2007 – 17 March 2020
- Constituency: Namur Province

Personal details
- Born: 10 January 1976 (age 50) Dinant, Belgium
- Party: Reformist Movement
- Education: Université catholique de Louvain

David Clarinval (French pronunciation: [david klaʁɛ̃val]; born 10 January 1976) is a Belgian politician of the Reformist Movement who has been serving as Minister of Labour and Economy in the De Wever government since February 2025. Additionally he was serving as Minister of Agriculture since October 2020 in both the De Croo government and the De Wever government. Before that he served as Minister of the Middle Class, SMEs, Self-employed, Social Integration and Urban Policy in the De Croo government.

== Early life ==
Clarinval was born on 10 January 1976 in the town of Dinant. He studied political science at Université catholique de Louvain. After graduation, he served as an assistant to the Mouvement Réformateur in the Chamber of Representatives.

== Political career ==
In the 2000 Belgian local elections, at age 24, Clarinval was elected mayor of the town of Bièvre. At the time, he was the youngest mayor in the country.

Clarinval has been a member of the Chamber of Representatives of Belgium since 2007. On 27 October 2019, he was appointed by Prime Minister Sophie Wilmès as the Minister of Budget and Public Service and Minister for Science Policy. In November, he was appointed as one of three Deputy Prime Ministers, replacing Didier Reynders.

With the gradual withdrawal of Sophie Wilmès from the government, Clarinval became Deputy Prime Minister in April 2022, initially on a provisional basis and definitively from July 14, 2022.
