= Maxime Prévot =

Belgian politician (born 1978)

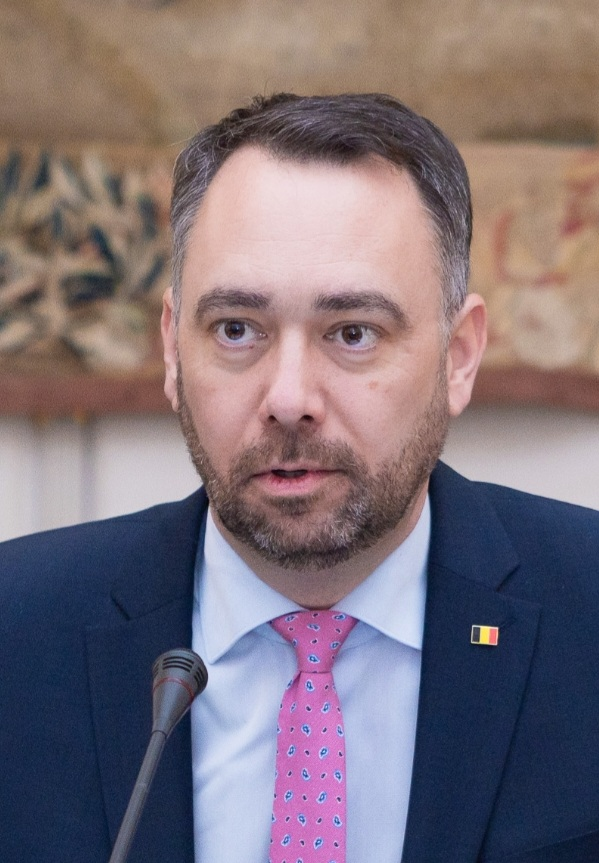
- Prévot in 2025

Deputy Prime Minister of Belgium
- Incumbent
- Assumed office 3 February 2025
- Prime Minister: Bart De Wever

Minister of Foreign Affairs, European Affairs and Development Cooperation
- Incumbent
- Assumed office 3 February 2025
- Prime Minister: Bart De Wever
- Preceded by: Bernard Quintin (as Minister of Foreign and European Affairs); Frank Vandenbroucke (as Minister of Development Cooperation)

Mayor of Namur
- In office 5 March 2012 – 3 February 2025
- Preceded by: Jacques Etienne
- Succeeded by: Charlotte Bazelaire

Member of the Chamber of Representatives
- In office 20 June 2019 – 3 February 2025
- Constituency: Namur Province

Member of the Parliament of Wallonia
- In office 28 July 2017 – 3 May 2019
- In office 7 June 2009 – 22 July 2014

President of Les Engagés
- In office 26 January 2019 – 3 February 2025
- Preceded by: Benoit Lutgen
- Succeeded by: Yvan Verougstraete (acting)

Personal details
- Born: Maxime Patrick Robert Albert Prévot; 9 April 1978 (age 48) Mons, Belgium
- Party: Les Engagés (2022–present)
- Other political affiliations: cdH (2004–2022)
- Spouse: Nathalie Lusson
- Children: 1
- Education: UCLouvain; University of Namur

Maxime Patrick Robert Albert Prévot (French pronunciation: [maksim pʁevo]; born 9 April 1978) is a Belgian politician and a member of the Les Engagés party. He has served as Deputy Prime Minister of Belgium and Minister of Foreign Affairs, European Affairs and Development Cooperation in the De Wever Government since February 2025.

Prévot previously served as Mayor of Namur from 2012 to 2025 and as President of Les Engagés from 2019 to 2025. He has been a member of the Chamber of Representatives since 2019 and has served as a member of the Parliament of Wallonia, first from 2009 to 2014 and again from 2017 to 2019.

== Early life and education ==
Prévot was born in Mons on 9 April 1978. He grew up in Luxembourg, where his father worked as a computer scientist for the European Commission, and later lived in Arlon. At the age of seven, following his parents’ divorce, he moved with his brother and their mother to Dave, a section of the municipality of Namur. He completed his secondary education at the Institut Saint-Berthuin in Malonne.

He studied political science at the Université de Namur before continuing his studies at UCLouvain. He subsequently returned to the Université de Namur to specialize in law and the management of information and communication technologies. Alongside his studies, he was also a Scout leader and a football referee.

After completing his studies, he spent three years working as a consultant for PwC and later worked for IBM, before devoting himself entirely to politics.

== Political career ==
Prévot joined the Humanist Democratic Centre (cdH) in 2004 and became president of the Namur branch of the Young cdH. In the 2006 local elections, he was elected to the Namur Provincial Council. In the 2007 federal election, he was elected to the Chamber of Representatives. In the 2009 regional elections, he was elected to the Parliament of Wallonia, where he became leader of the cdH parliamentary group. In 2010, he was once again elected to the Chamber of Representatives.

In the 2012 local elections, Prévot was elected Mayor of Namur at the age of 34, making him the youngest mayor in the city's history, with 13,549 preferential votes. Le Soir described the result as one of the highest electoral scores ever recorded in Namur, noting that no candidate had received more than 10,000 preferential votes in the city for at least four decades.

In the 2014 regional elections, Prévot was the lead candidate on the cdH list in the Namur constituency. He was temporarily appointed President of the Parliament of Wallonia while negotiations were underway to form a new Walloon Government. The new executive took office on 22 July 2014, with Prévot becoming Vice-President of the Walloon Government and Minister of Public Works, Health, Social Action and Heritage. In June 2017, following the collapse of the Walloon governing coalition, Prévot resigned from the Walloon Government in order to focus on his role as Mayor of Namur. He was re-elected mayor in the 2018 local elections with 12,850 preferential votes, the second-highest electoral result in the city's history.

In January 2019, former cdH president Benoît Lutgen announced his intention to step down as party leader. Prévot subsequently entered the leadership race and was elected party president with 85% of the vote. In the 2019 federal election, Prévot was re-elected to the Chamber of Representatives.

Following the 2019 electoral defeat, the cdH undertook a major political reorganization. In 2022, the party was renamed Les Engagés, adopting a new political identity and moving away from its traditional Christian-democratic positioning towards a more socially liberal and progressive orientation. The party also left the European People's Party and joined the European Democratic Party at the European level.

Prévot was re-elected to the Chamber of Representatives in the 2024 federal election, in which Les Engagés doubled its number of seats. Following eight months of coalition negotiations, a government agreement was reached on 31 January 2025. Les Engagés obtained three ministerial positions among those allocated to French-speaking parties. On 3 February 2025, Prévot relinquished the presidency of Les Engagés and became Deputy Prime Minister and Minister of Foreign Affairs, European Affairs and Development Cooperation in the De Wever Government.

== Political positions ==
Prévot has been described as belonging to the more centre-right camp of the cdH with some of his ideas being close to those of the Mouvement Réformateur. At the same time, he has described himself as holding progressive views on a number of social and political issues.

Prévot condemned the March 2025 Israeli attacks on the Gaza Strip, adding that Israel's blocking of humanitarian aid to Palestinians was "a serious violation of international law".

In September 2025, Prévot announced that Belgium will recognise Palestine as a state at the United Nations General Assembly and will impose 12 "firm" sanctions against Israel.

In October 2025, Prévot condemned the massacre in El Fasher, Sudan.

== Personal life ==
Prévot has been married to Nathalie Lusson, an auditor, since August 2018. He has a daughter, Valentine, from a previous relationship. Nathalie has two children from a previous marriage, making the couple a blended family of three children.

== Other activities ==
- World Bank, Ex-Officio Alternate Member of the Board of Governors (since 2025)
