= Pierre-Yves Dermagne =

Belgian politician

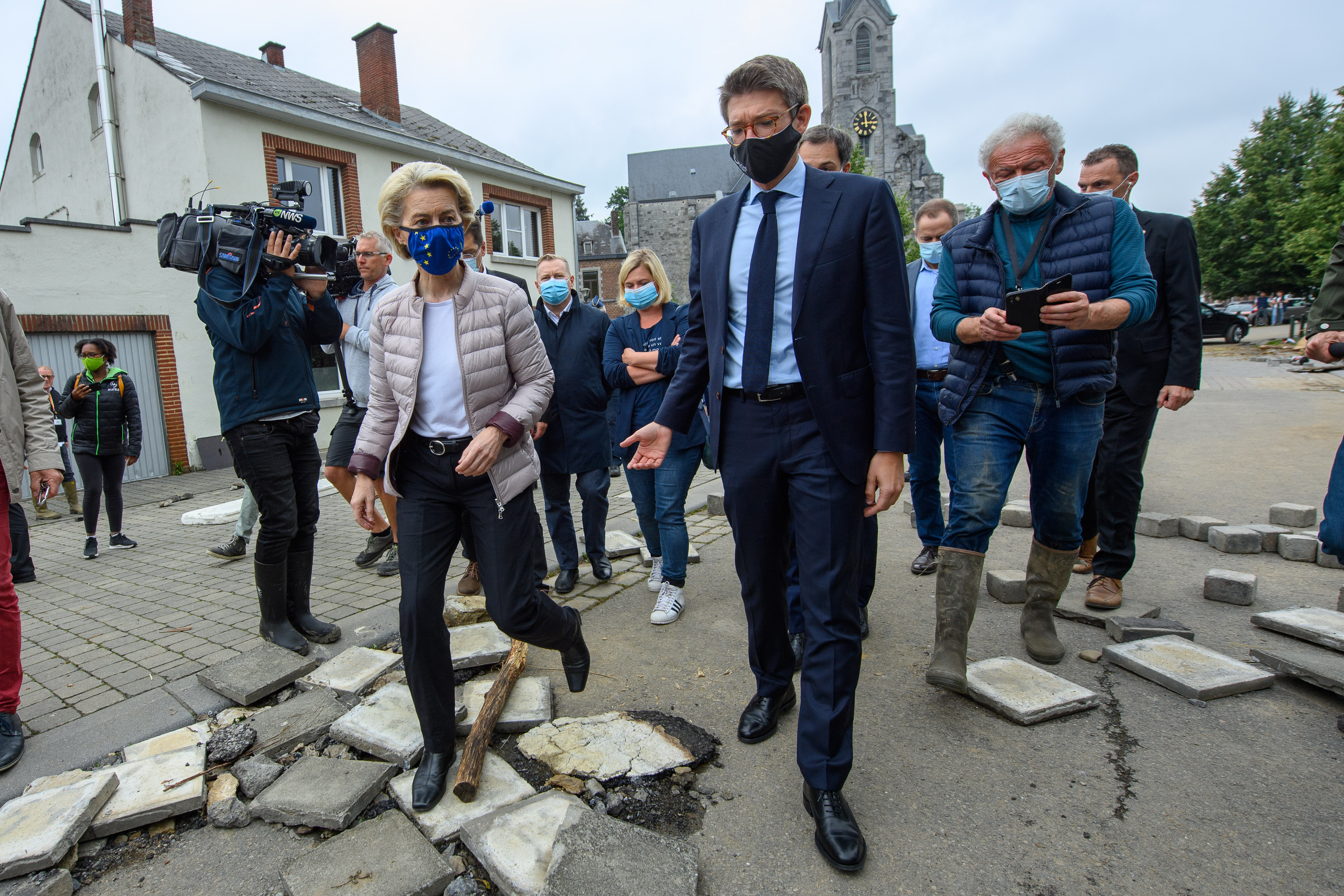
- Dermagne in 2021

Minister of Economy and Employment
- In office 1 October 2020 – 3 February 2025
- Prime Minister: Alexander De Croo
- Preceded by: Nathalie Muylle
- Succeeded by: David Clarinval

Walloon Minister of Local Government and Housing
- In office 13 September 2019 – 1 October 2020
- Preceded by: Valérie De Bue
- Succeeded by: Christophe Collignon
- In office 26 January 2017 – 28 July 2017
- Preceded by: Paul Furlan
- Succeeded by: Valérie De Bue

Mayor of Rochefort
- Incumbent
- Assumed office 3 December 2018
- Preceded by: François Bellot

Personal details
- Born: 30 December 1980 (age 45) Namur, Belgium
- Party: Socialist Party (Francophone)
- Education: Université catholique de Louvain

Pierre-Yves Dermagne (born 30 December 1980) is a Belgian politician who served as Minister of Economy and Employment in the De Croo Government led by Prime Minister Alexander De Croo between 2020 and 2025. He is affiliated with the Socialist Party (Parti Socialiste). He was elected to the Belgian Federal Parliament in the 2024 Belgian federal election.

== Early life and career ==
Dermagne was born on 30 December 1980 in Namur. He is the eldest son of Madeleine Barnich and Jean-Marie Dermagne, who served as a lawyer at the Dinant bar from Rochefort. In 2003 he obtained a law degree from the Catholic University of Louvain, and soon afterward started becoming politically active. He was parliamentary attache to the Walloon Parliament. In 2006 taking a seat as a provincial councillor for Namur and a municipal councillor for Rochefort. In 2009 he joined Eliane Tillieux's cabinet as political secretary, before in 2012 becoming the first alderman of Rochefort. Returning to Namur in 2014, he was elected to the Parliament of Wallonia. In January 2017 he become Minister of Local Authorities in Wallonia, succeeding Paul Furlan temporarily as Furlan resigned following an affair. He stopped being minister 6 months later, returning to the post of alderman of Rochefort and leader of the PS group in parliament.

He won the 2018 communal elections in Rochefort with 2,109 votes over François Bellot. In October 2021, he advocated for a reduction in the work week from five days a week to four.
