= Claude Eerdekens =

Belgian politician from Wallonia

Burgomaster of Andenne
- In office 1979–2024

Personal details
- Born: May 13, 1948 (age 78) Ougrée, Belgium
- Party: Socialist Party

Claude Eerdekens (born May 13, 1948, in Ougrée), is a Belgian politician, burgomaster of Andenne from 1979 to 2024, and member of the Socialist Party.

== Biography ==
He was candidate in the regional elections of June 13, 2004, and elected to the Walloon Parliament. On July 19, 2004, he became Minister of the French Community of Belgium responsible for the Civil Service and Sports. In December 2004, a controversy broke out over a case of doping in which the Russian tennis player Svetlana Kuznetsova, who tested positive for ephedrine, was allegedly involved. during an exhibition tournament in Charleroi, after Minister Eerdekens revealed the results of this control a little too quickly to the press.

Re-elected to the House of Representatives following the elections of June 10, 2007, he left the government of the French Community. His skills were taken over by Michel Daerden, and he was digitally replaced by Marc Tarabella.

On July 16, 2007, he returned to the Walloon Parliament as deputy to Minister Éliane Tillieux. On January 14, 2011, Claude Eerdekens insulted Flanders nationalist Bart de wever during an interview with the channel namuroise in Bouké.

In March 2011, he mistreated the opposition of the Andenne Municipal Council. He was called to order by the minister responsible for monitoring local authorities.

On the political level, Claude Eerdekens proposed the development of various laws aimed at combating extremism; the law fighting against negationism, revisionism, the denial of the crimes committed by Nazism as well as the law on the non-financing of non-democratic parties. In the municipal elections of 2012, he was re-elected mayor of Andenne.

Claude Eerdekens is an Officer of the Order of Leopold. He is in favor of the rattachism of Wallonia to France.
