= Arrondissement of Namur =

Arrondissement in Wallonia, Belgium

Arrondissement of Namur Arrondissement de Namur
- Arrondissement
- Location of the arrondissement in Namur
- Coordinates: 50.5°N 4.9°E
- Country: Belgium
- Region: Wallonia
- Province: Namur
- Municipalities: 16

Area
  - Total: 1,164.85 km^{2} (449.75 sq mi)

Population (1 January 2017)
  - Total: 314,541
  - Density: 270.027/km^{2} (699.367/sq mi)
- Time zone: UTC+1 (CET)
  - Summer (DST): UTC+2 (CEST)
- ISO 3166 code: BE.NA.NM

The Arrondissement of Namur (French: Arrondissement de Namur) is one of the three administrative arrondissements in the Walloon province of Namur, Belgium. It is both an administrative and a judicial arrondissement. The territory of the Judicial Arrondissement of Namur coincides with that of the Administrative Arrondissement of Namur.

== Municipalities ==
The Administrative Arrondissement of Namur consists of the following municipalities:

- Andenne
- Assesse
- Éghezée
- Fernelmont
- Floreffe
- Fosses-la-Ville
- Gembloux
- Gesves
- Jemeppe-sur-Sambre
- La Bruyère
- Mettet
- Namur
- Ohey
- Profondeville
- Sambreville
- Sombreffe
