= Arrondissement of Philippeville =

Arrondissement in Wallonia, Belgium

Arrondissement of Philippeville Arrondissement de Philippeville
- Arrondissement
- Location of the arrondissement in Namur
- Coordinates: 50.2°N 4.55°E
- Country: Belgium
- Region: Wallonia
- Province: Namur
- Municipalities: 7

Area
  - Total: 908.74 km^{2} (350.87 sq mi)

Population (1 January 2017)
  - Total: 66,409
  - Density: 73.078/km^{2} (189.27/sq mi)
- Time zone: UTC+1 (CET)
  - Summer (DST): UTC+2 (CEST)

The Arrondissement of Philippeville (French: Arrondissement de Philippeville; Dutch: Arrondissement Philippeville) is one of the three administrative arrondissements in the Walloon province of Namur, Wallonia, Belgium.

The Administrative Arrondissement of Philippeville consists of the following municipalities:

- Cerfontaine
- Couvin
- Doische
- Florennes
- Philippeville
- Viroinval
- Walcourt
