= Namur Province =

Province of Wallonia, Belgium

Namur Nameur (Walloon) Namen (Dutch)
- Province of Belgium
- Flag Coat of arms Brandmark

- Interactive map of Namur
- Coordinates: 50°27′51″N 4°51′42″E
- Country: Belgium
- Region: Wallonia
- Capital: Namur

Government
  - Governor: Denis Mathen

Area
  - Total: 3,675 km^{2} (1,419 sq mi)

Population (1 January 2024)
  - Total: 503,895
  - Density: 137.1/km^{2} (355.1/sq mi)

GDP
  - Total: €18.216 billion (2024)
  - Per capita: €35,787 (2024)
- HDI (2021): 0.905 very high · 9th of 11
- Website: Official site

Namur (French: [namyʁ]; Walloon: Nameur; Dutch: Namen [ˈnaːmə(n)]) is a province of Wallonia, one of the three regions of Belgium. It borders (clockwise from the West) on the Walloon provinces of Hainaut, Walloon Brabant, Liège and Luxembourg in Belgium, and the French department of Ardennes. Its capital and largest city is the city of Namur. As of January 2024, the province of Namur has a population of about 0.5 million.

== Subdivisions ==
Municipal divisions of Namur (click on image for full legend).

It has an area of 3,675 square kilometres (1,419 sq mi) and is divided into three administrative districts (arrondissements in French) containing a total of 38 municipalities (communes in French).

Map no.	Municipality	Arrondissement
1	Andenne	Namur
2	Anhée	Dinant
3	Assesse	Namur
4	Beauraing	Dinant
5	Bièvre	Dinant
6	Cerfontaine	Philippeville
7	Ciney	Dinant
8	Couvin	Philippeville
9	Dinant	Dinant
10	Doische	Philippeville
11	Éghezée	Namur
12	Fernelmont	Namur
13	Floreffe	Namur
14	Florennes	Philippeville
15	Fosses-la-Ville	Namur
16	Gedinne	Dinant
17	Gembloux	Namur
18	Gesves	Namur
19	Hamois	Dinant
20	Hastière	Dinant
21	Havelange	Dinant
22	Houyet	Dinant
23	Jemeppe-sur-Sambre	Namur
24	La Bruyère	Namur
25	Mettet	Namur
26	Namur	Namur
27	Ohey	Namur
28	Onhaye	Dinant
29	Philippeville	Philippeville
30	Profondeville	Namur
31	Rochefort	Dinant
32	Sambreville	Namur
33	Sombreffe	Namur
34	Somme-Leuze	Dinant
35	Viroinval	Philippeville
36	Vresse-sur-Semois	Dinant
37	Walcourt	Philippeville
38	Yvoir	Dinant

== Economy ==
The Gross domestic product (GDP) of the province was 13.5 billion € in 2018, accounting for 2.9% of Belgium's economic output. GDP per capita adjusted for purchasing power was 24,000 € or 80% of the EU27 average in the same year. GDP per person employed was 104% of the EU27 average.

== List of governors ==
- 1830–1834: Goswin de Stassart (Liberal)
- 1834–1840: Joseph Lebeau (Liberal)
- 1840–1847: Edouard d'Huart (Liberal)
- 1887–1848: Adolphe de Vrière (Liberal)
- 1848–1851: François Pirson (Liberal)
- 1853–1875: Charles de Baillet (Catholic Party)
- 1876–1877: D. de Mevius
- 1877–1881: Albert de Beauffort (Catholic Party)
- 1881–1882: Léon Pety de Thozée (Liberal)
- 1882–1884: Auguste Vergote
- 1884–1914: Charles de Montpellier de Vedrin
- 1919–1937: Pierre de Gaiffier d'Hestroy
- 1937–1944: François Bovesse (Liberal)
- 1945–1968: Robert Gruslin
- 1968–1977: René Close (PS)
- 1977–1980: Pierre Falize (PS)
- 1980–1987: Emile Lacroix
- 1987–1994: Emile Wauthy (PSC)
- 1994–2007: Amand Dalem (PSC)
- 2007–present: Denis Mathen (MR)

== Twinning ==
The Province of Namur is twinned with:

- Louga Region, Senegal
- Jiangsu Province, China
- Tunis Governorate, Tunisia

== See also ==
- County of Namur
