= HSL 3 =

High-speed railway in Belgium

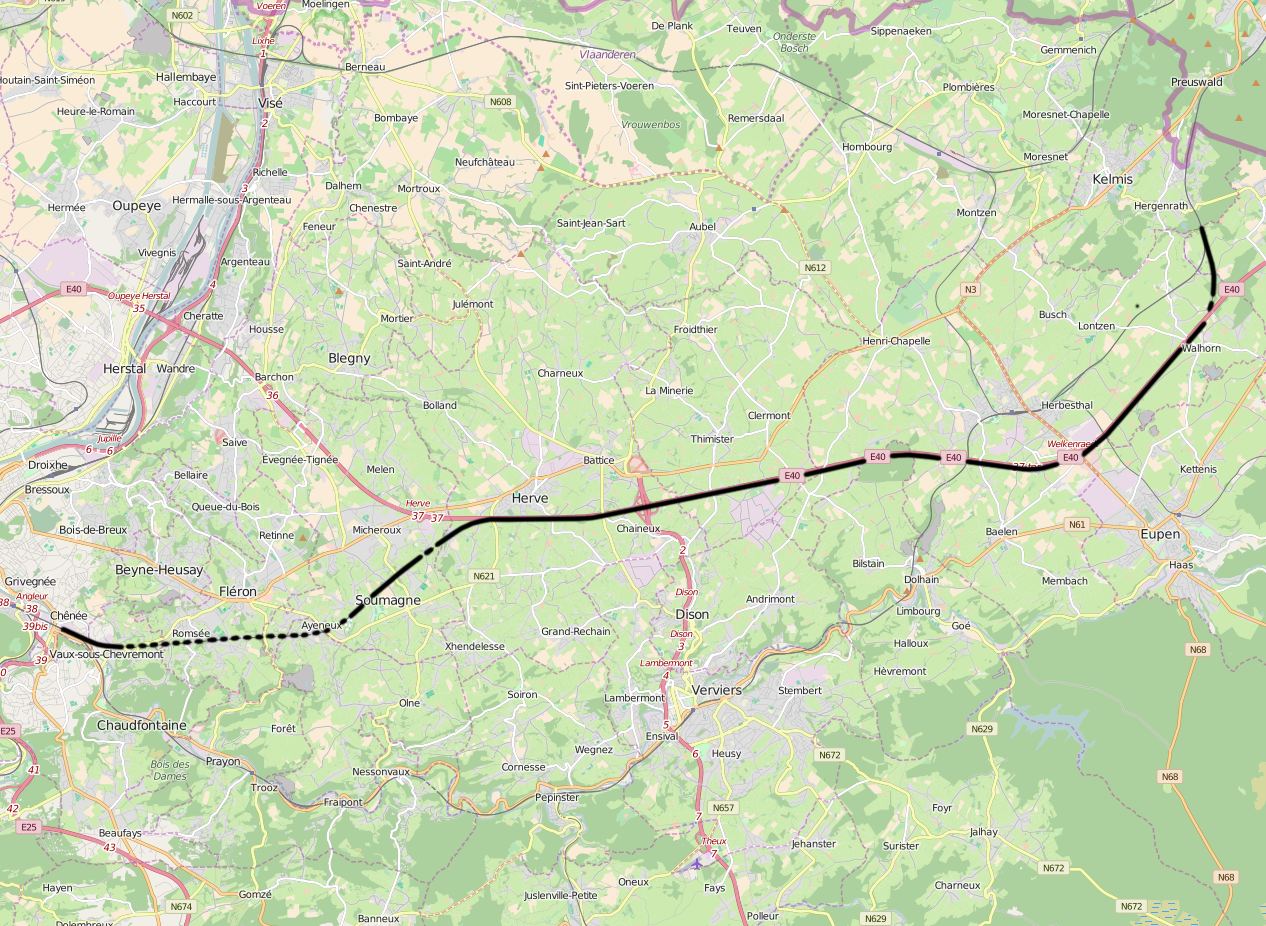

Overview
- Status: In operation
- Owner: Infrabel
- Locale: Belgium
- Termini: Chênée (in Liège); Hergenrath (in Kelmis)
- Stations: 0

Service
- Type: High Speed Rail
- System: Belgian HSL
- Operator(s): Thalys, ICE
- Rolling stock: Thalys PBKA, ICE 3M

History
- Opened: 14 June 2009

Technical
- Line length: 42 km (26 mi)
- Number of tracks: 2
- Track gauge: 1,435 mm (4 ft 8 1/2 in) standard gauge
- Electrification: 25 kV, 50 Hz AC
- Operating speed: 260 km/h (160 mph)

The HSL 3 (Dutch: Hogesnelheidslijn 3, English: High-Speed Line 3, French: LGV 3, ligne à grande vitesse 3) is a Belgian high-speed rail line. It connects Liège to the German border near Aachen. The high-speed track length is 42 km (26 mi).

The line was technically completed in October 2007; however, it did not come into operation until 14 June 2009, when ICE trains began service. Thalys trains have been using the line since 13 December 2009. The interval between completion of the line and its actual use was due to difficulties in the implementation of the safety system ETCS level 2, specifically, finding trains with ERTMS fitted.

Together with the HSL 2 between Louvain and Liège and HSL 1 between Brussels and the French border, the combined eastward high-speed line has greatly reduced journey times between Brussels, Paris and Germany. HSL 3 has cut Liège – Cologne journey times from 1 h 23 min to 1 h 1 min. HSL 3 is used only by international high-speed trains (Thalys, now Eurostar; and ICE), as opposed to HSL 2, which is also used for fast internal InterCity services.

== Route ==
Belgian high speed network.

Trains leave the reconstructed Liège-Guillemins station over the upgraded classic line, at speeds which progressively rise to 120 km/h (75 mph). The dedicated high-speed tracks branch off from the "slow" line at the bridge over the Ourthe, between Angleur and Chênée stations in the suburbs of Liège. The line crosses the Vesdre river, then traverses the 6.5 km (4.0 mi) long Soumagne Tunnel between Vaux-sous-Chèvremont and Soumagne. This is the longest double-track tunnel in Belgium, and has a speed limit of 200 km/h (120 mph).

The line then runs parallel to the A3 motorway with a speed limit of 260 km (160 mi) shortly after the village of Walhorn, it passes under the A3 in a cut-and-cover section, and rejoins the regular line. Trains run on the upgraded classic line 37 at 140 km/h (85 mph), pass over the Hammerbrücke viaduct (entirely reconstructed for the project), and cross the border 2 kilometres (1.2 mi) further on.

Beyond the border, high-speed trains travel along upgraded existing rail lines to Aachen Hauptbahnhof. Trains use left-hand running along this section (as in Belgium), switching over to right-hand running, which is common in Germany, at Aachen Hauptbahnhof.

== Construction ==
Infrabel, the Belgian rail infrastructure manager, constructed the line through its subsidiary TUC Rail, who built the 36 kilometres (22 mi) line between 2001 and 2007 at a cost of €830m, including ETCS Level 2 signalling.

The most notable construction subproject is the 6.505-kilometre (4 mi 74 yd) long tunnel at Soumagne, which is the longest railway tunnel in Belgium. The bored section is 5.940 kilometres (3 mi 1,216 yd), extended by covered sections of respectively 177 metres (194 yd) and 388 metres (424 yd). Dozens of geological layers of differing hardness had to be tunnelled through, lime layers needing to be blasted through with dynamite. The tunnel reaches a depth of 127 metres (417 ft) in some areas; it has an average ramp height of 1.7%, with a maximum of 2% at the entrance in Soumagne. The free space profile in the tunnel is approximately 69 m^{2} (740 sq ft), which restricts speeds to 200 km/h (120 mph). The tunnel was built between 14 May 2001 and August 2005.

== Gallery ==
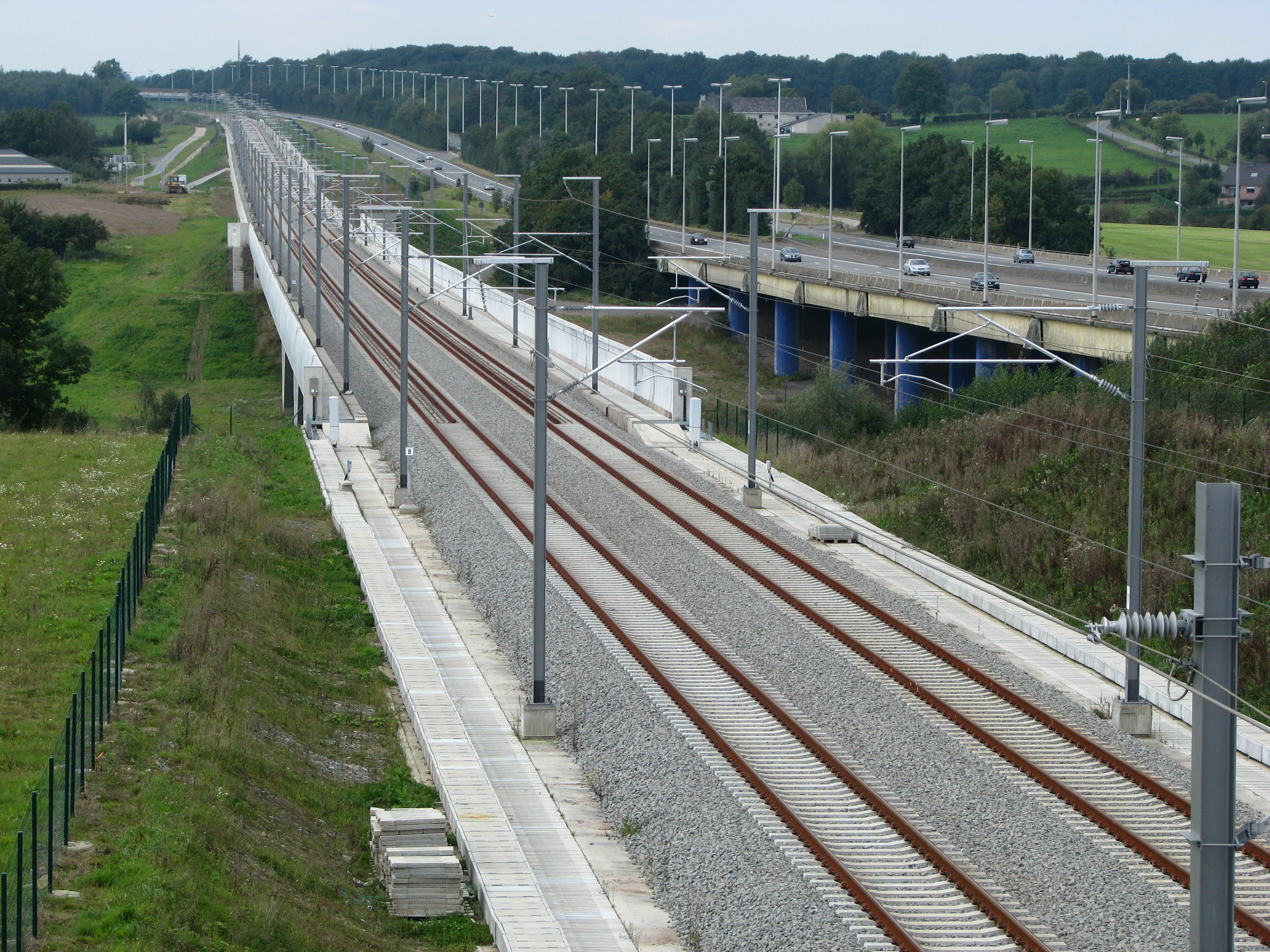
Viaduct over the Ruyff valley.

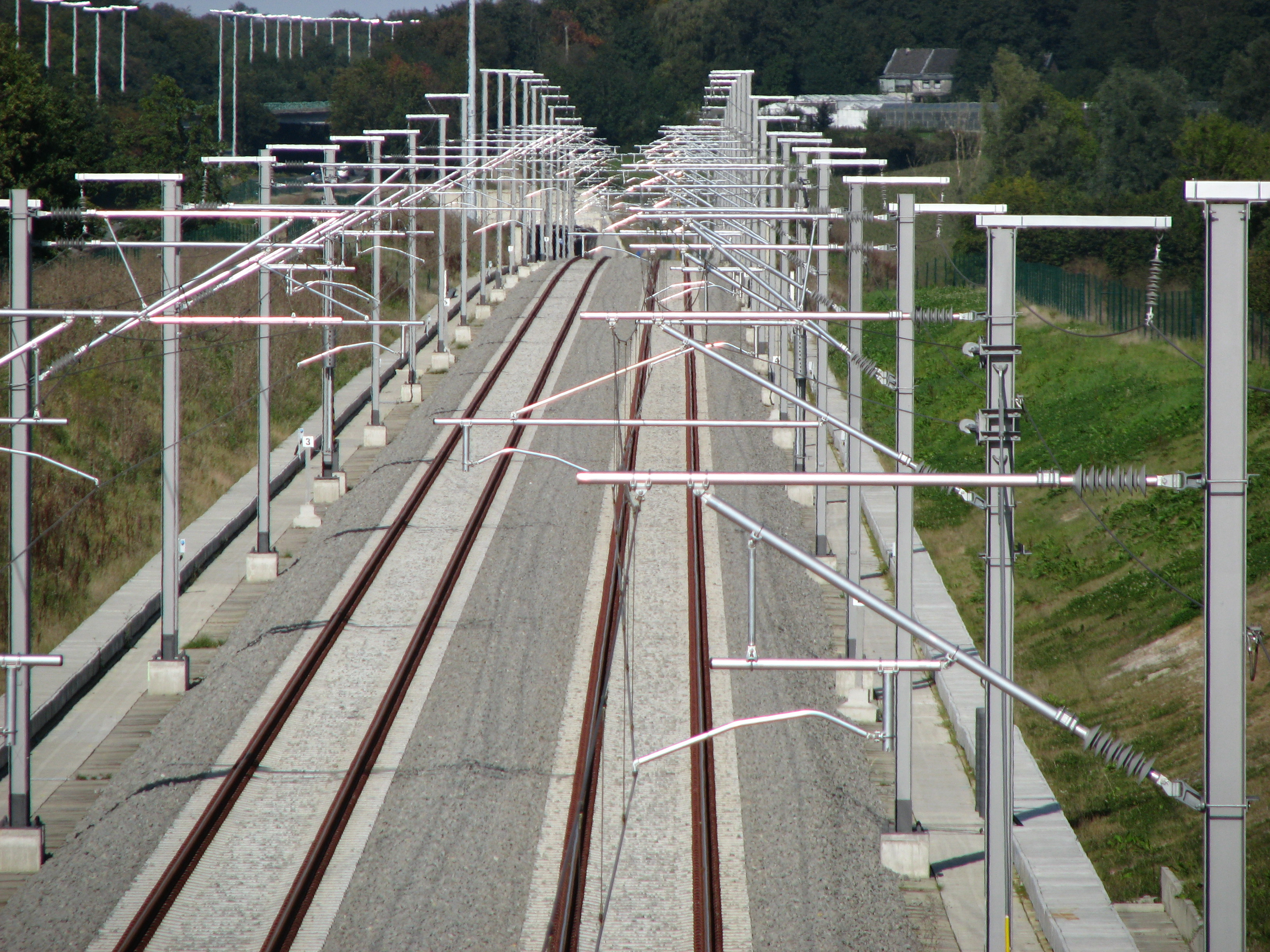
HSL 3 near Walhorn.

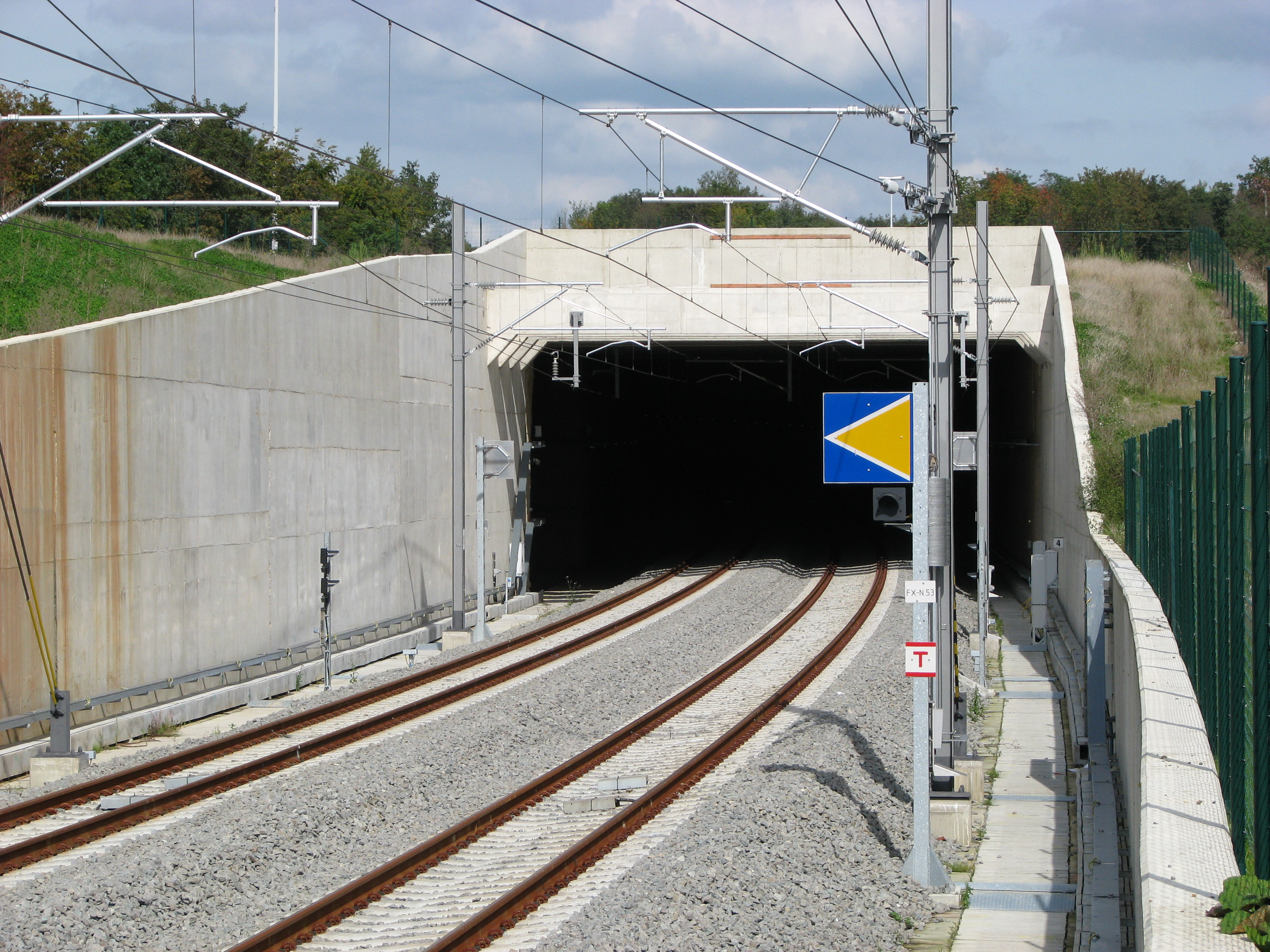
Walhorn Tunnel West Portal

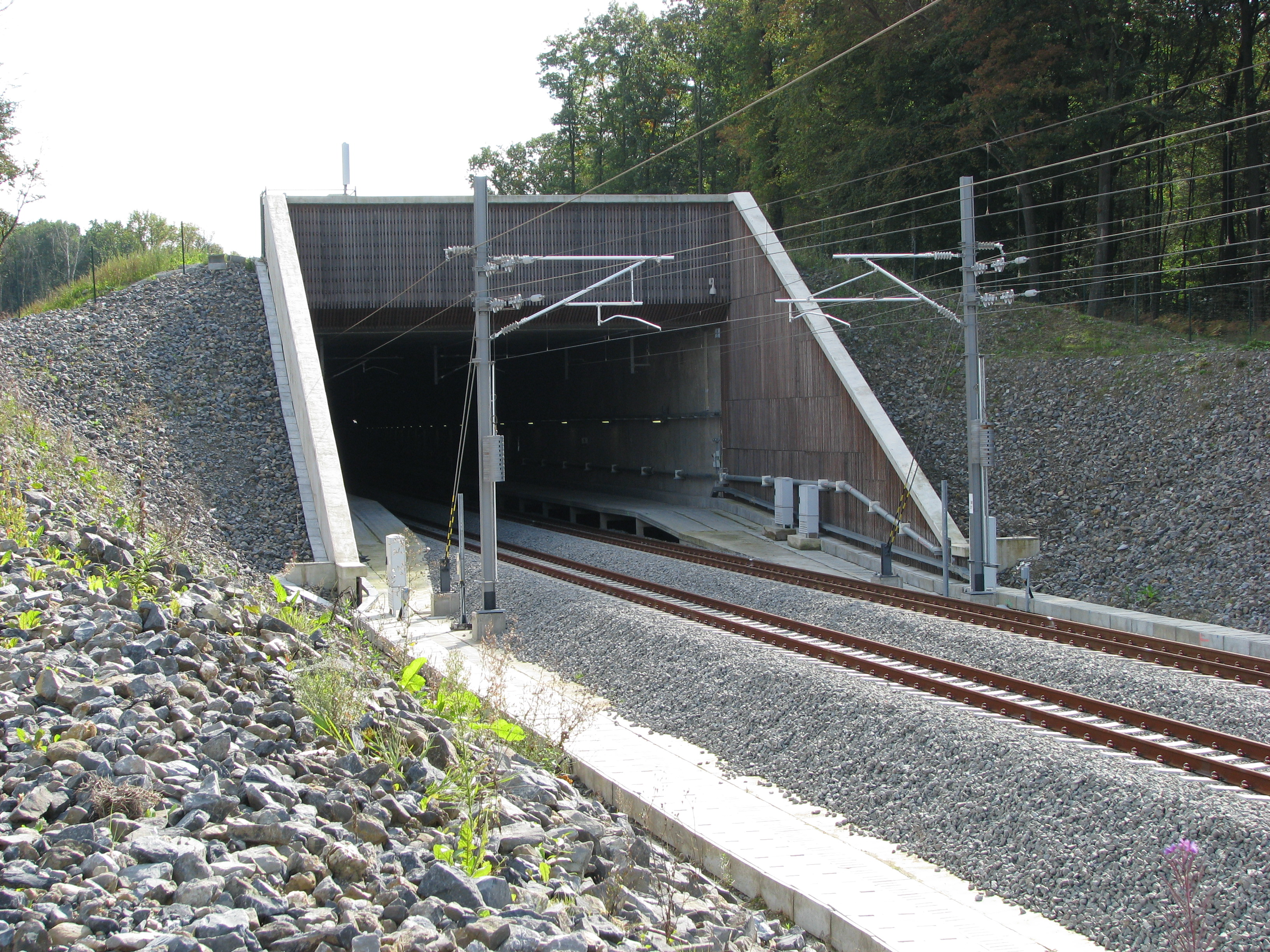
Walhorn Tunnel East Portal

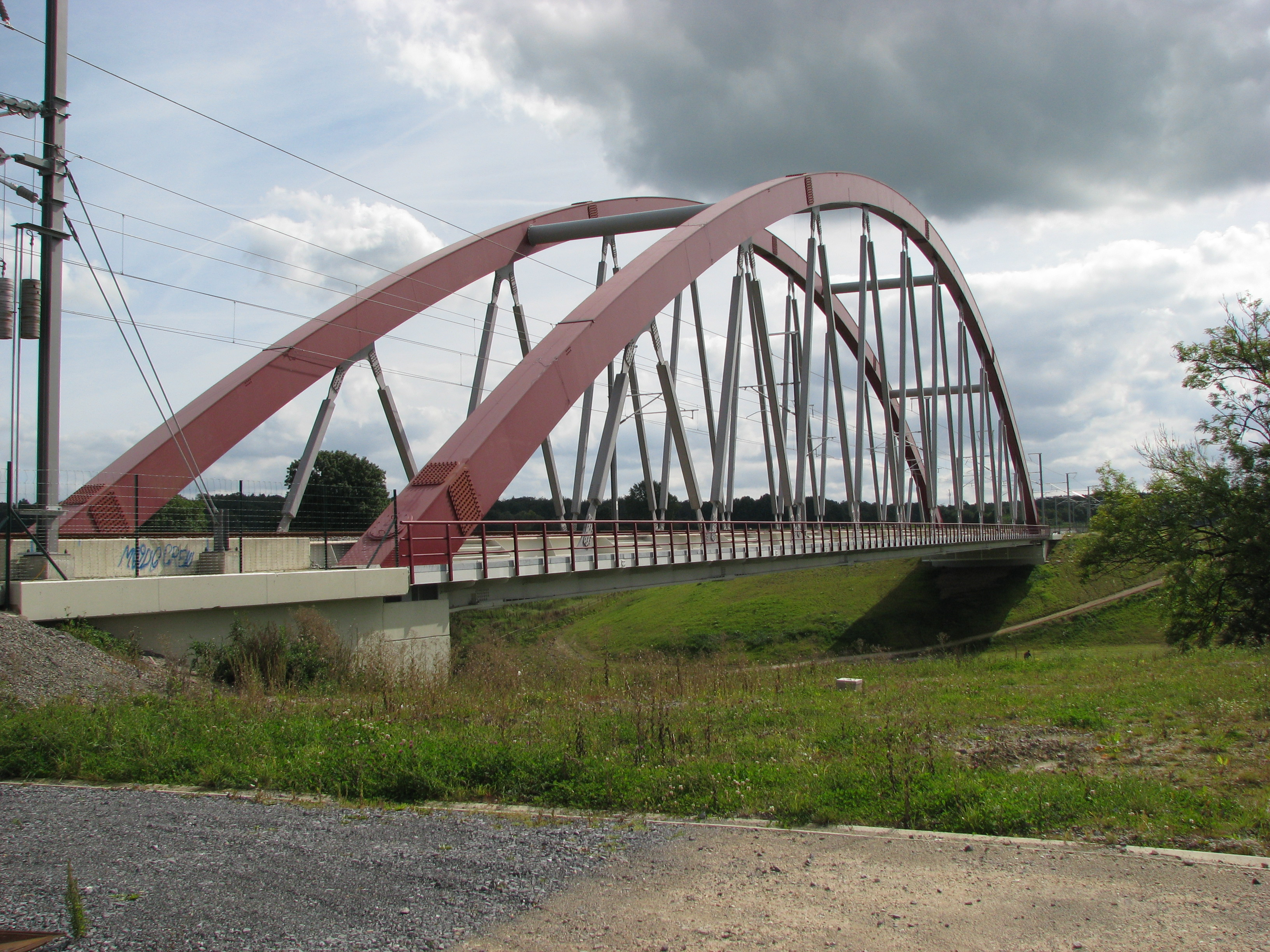
Railway Bridge Hauset

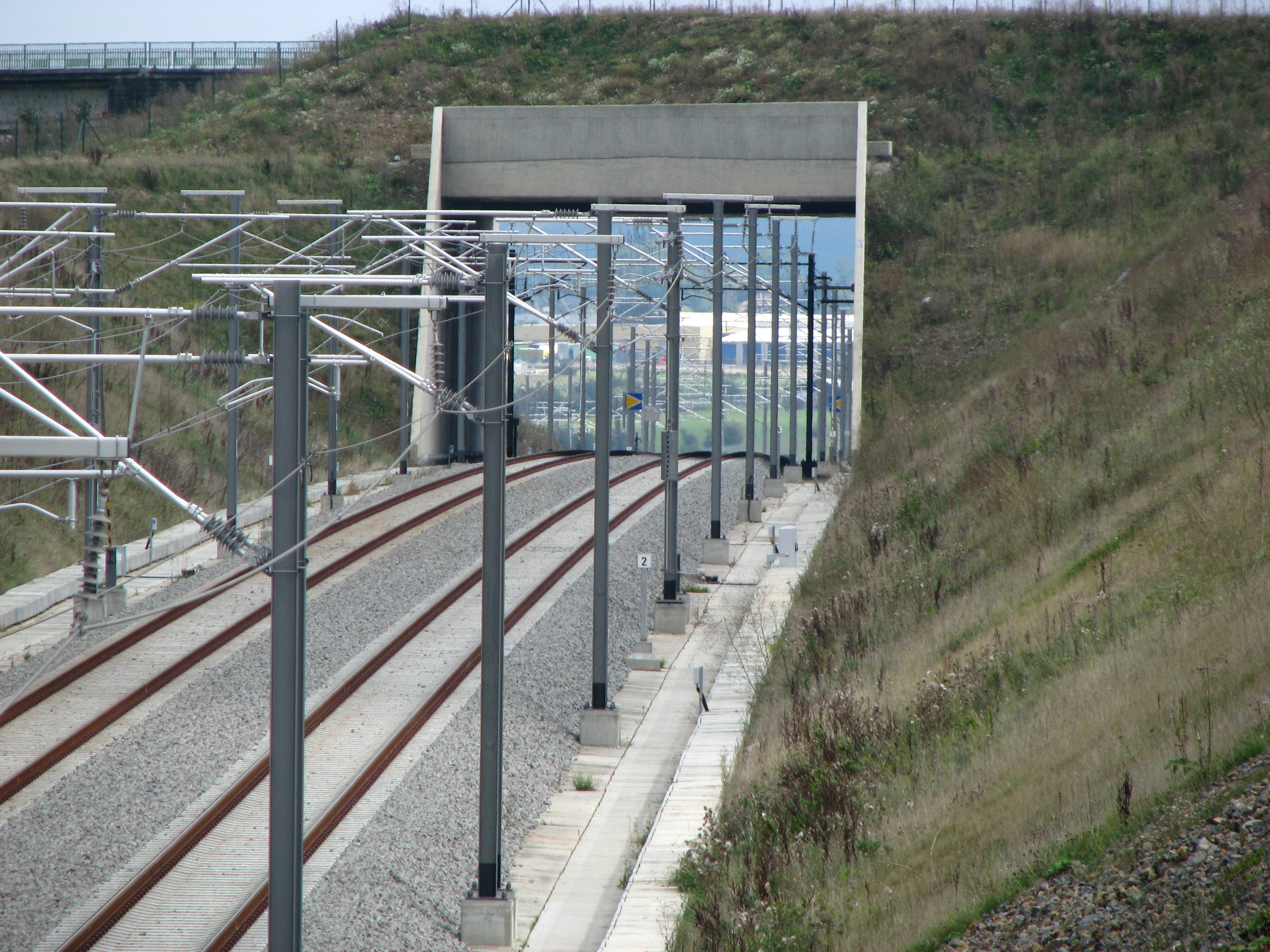
HSL 3 near Baelen

== See also ==
- High-speed rail in Belgium
