= Soumagne Tunnel =

Longest rail tunnel in Belgium

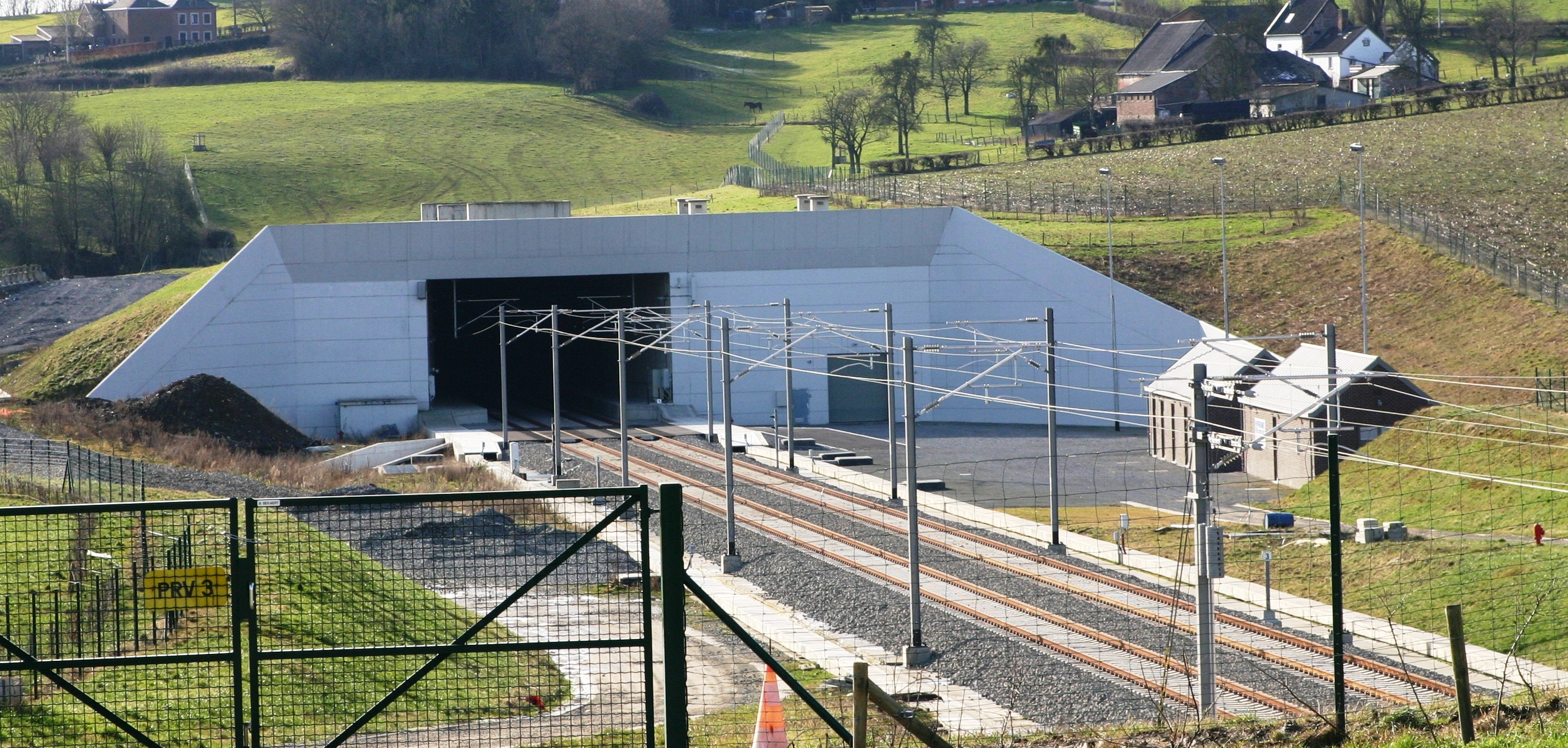
- Eastern tunnel portal near Soumagne
- Interactive map of Soumagne Tunnel

Overview
- Line: HSL 3
- Coordinates: Vaux-sous-Chèvremont: 50°36′12″N 5°38′14″E; Soumagne: 50°36′40″N 5°43′33″E
- Status: Active
- Start: Vaux-sous-Chèvremont, Liège, Belgum
- End: Soumagne, Liège, Belgum

Operation
- Constructed: 2001–2004
- Opened: 12 June 2009
- Owner: Infrabel
- Traffic: High-speed rail

Technical
- Line length: 6,505 m (4.042 mi)
- No. of tracks: 2
- Track gauge: 1,435 mm (4 ft 8 1/2 in) standard gauge
- Electrified: Overhead line, 25 kV 50 Hz AC
- Operating speed: 200 km/h (120 mph)
- Grade: 1.7% (average); 2% (maximum)

The Soumagne Tunnel is the longest rail tunnel in Belgium, with a length of 6,505 metres (4.042 mi). Built on the HSL 3 line of the Belgian TGV service for Brussels-Liège-Cologne, the tunnel was completed in 2004. The new line was opened on June 12, 2009. The tunnel links the Liège conurbation with the Herve plateau at a depth of 120 metres (390 ft). Construction and outfitting of the tunnel took place from 2001 to 2005, with the first trains passing through in 2009. The entrances are at Vaux-sous-Chèvremont and Soumagne. The tunnel passes under Chaudfontaine, Fléron, Romsée and Ayeneux.

The bored section is 5,940 metres (6,500 yd), extended by covered sections of respectively 177 and 388 m. Dozens of geological layers of differing hardness had to be tunnelled through, lime layers needing to be blasted through with dynamite. The tunnel reaches a depth of 127 m in some areas; it has an average ramp height of 1.7%, with a maximum of 2% at the entrance in Soumagne. The free space profile in the tunnel is approximately 69 m^{2} (740 sq ft), which restricts speeds to 200 km/h (120 mph).
