= George Horace Lorimer =

American journalist, author and publisher (1867–1937)

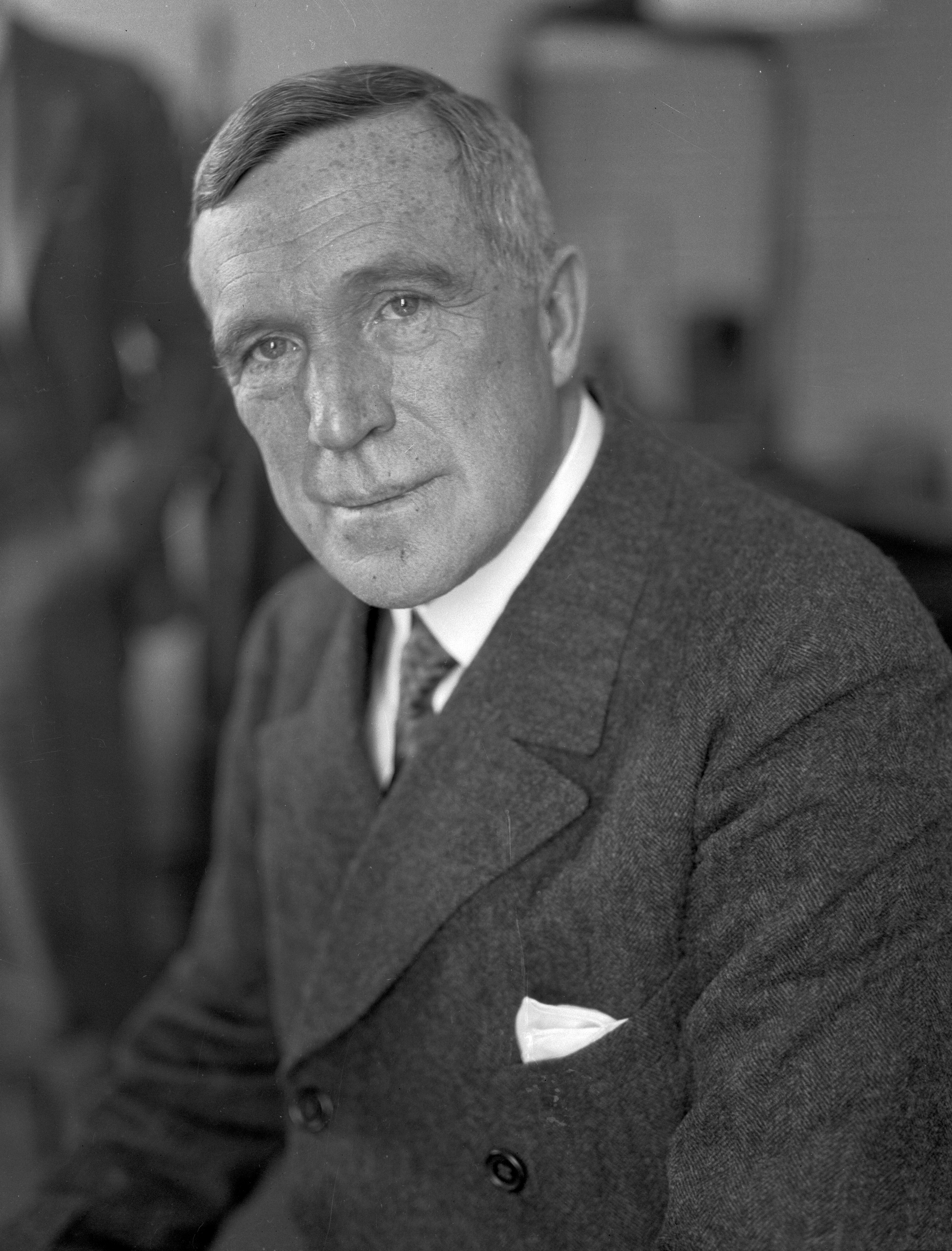
- Lorimer in 1928
- Born: October 6, 1867; Louisville, Kentucky
- Died: October 22, 1937 (aged 70); Wyncote, Pennsylvania
- Resting place: Laurel Hill Cemetery, Philadelphia, Pennsylvania, U.S.
- Occupations: Journalist, author, editor
- Known for: Editor-in-chief of The Saturday Evening Post; President of Curtis Publishing Company

George Horace Lorimer (October 6, 1867 – October 22, 1937) was an American journalist, editor, author and publisher who worked as the editor of The Saturday Evening Post from 1899 to 1936. During his time as editor, circulation rose from several thousand to more than one million. He published the works of some of the greatest American writers and hired the then unknown illustrator Norman Rockwell to create cover artwork. He became president of the Curtis Publishing Company in 1932 and served until 1936.

== Early life and education ==
Lorimer was born on October 6, 1867 in Louisville, Kentucky, the son of Rev. George C. Lorimer and Belle (née Burford) Lorimer. He attended Moseley High School in Chicago and Yale University.

He was convinced by one of his father's parishioners, Philip D. Armour, to leave Yale and work in the meatpacking business in Chicago from 1887 to 1895. He opened his own grocery business but it failed. In 1892, he married Alma Ennis.

He moved to Boston and worked as a reporter before returning to school at Colby College to study writing.

== Career ==
He worked as a journalist at the Boston Post and the Boston Herald. He was hired by Cyrus H. K. Curtis in 1897 as literary editor of The Saturday Evening Post. In March 1899, he was promoted to acting editor and replaced William George Jordan. He became editor-in-chief and published the works of some of the greatest American writers including Willa Cather, Stephen Crane, Theodore Dreiser, F. Scott Fitzgerald, Ring Lardner, Sinclair Lewis, Jack London and Frank Norris. He introduced European writers such as Joseph Conrad and John Galsworthy to American audiences. Lorimer convinced former U.S. President Grover Cleveland to write for the Post. In 1916, Lorimer hired the then unknown illustrator Norman Rockwell to create cover artwork for The Saturday Evening Post.

One of the most popular series in the Saturday Evening Post was anonymously written by Lorimer. Letters from a Self-Made Merchant to his Son was published in the op-ed page from 1901 to 1902 and portrayed letters written from a father, John Graham, a self-made pork packer, to his son, Pierrepont, who had just enrolled at Harvard. The fictional series was a huge success and the Saturday Evening Post received over 5,000 letters in response. In 1902, the series was published as a book and became a best seller in the United States and overseas. The success of the publication led to a sequel titled Old Gorgon Graham: More Letters From a Self-Made Merchant to His Son published in 1903.

In 1932, he became president of Curtis Publishing Company. He remained in charge until the last day of 1936, about a year before his death from throat cancer.

== Death and legacy ==
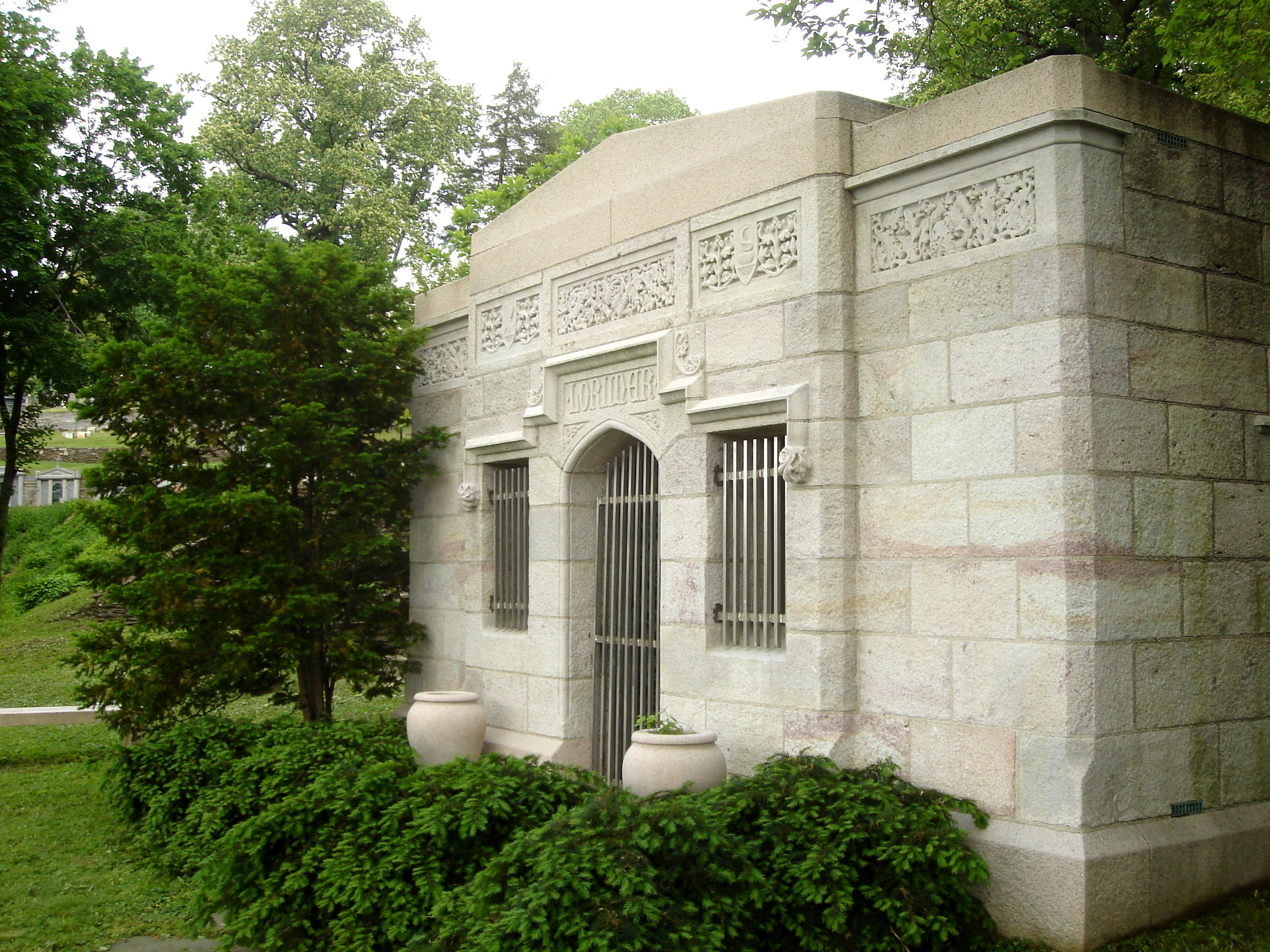
Lorimer's tomb in Laurel Hill Cemetery

He died on October 22, 1937, in Wyncote, Pennsylvania, and was interred at Laurel Hill Cemetery in Philadelphia. President Herbert Hoover was a pallbearer at his funeral.

Lorimer had a ten-acre estate in Wyncote, Pennsylvania, named Belgrame after his two children, Belle and Graeme. In 1945, the Handmaids of the Sacred Heart of Jesus purchased the property to use as the campus of Ancillae Assumpta Academy.

Lorimer's 132-acre (0.53 km^{2}) Kings Oak farm in Abington Township, Pennsylvania, was bequeathed to the citizens of Montgomery County, Pennsylvania, and forms part of the 230-acre (0.93 km^{2}) Lorimer Park.

His Letters From a Self-Made Merchant to His Son was the basis for the 1922 film A Self-made Man starring William Russell.

== Published works ==
- Letters from a Self-Made Merchant to His Son: Being the Letters written by John Graham, Head of the House of Graham & Company, Pork-Packers in Chicago, familiarly known on 'Change as "Old Gorgon Graham," to his Son, Pierrepont, facetiously known to his intimates as "Piggy.", Small, Maynard & Company, Boston, 1904
- Old Gorgon Graham: More Letters from a Self-Made Merchant to His Son, Doubleday, Page & Company, New York, 1904
- The False Gods, D. Appleton & Company, New York 1906
- Jack Spurlock, Prodigal, John Murray, London, 1908
