= Bruno Fagnoul =

Belgian politician (1936–2023)

Minister-President of the German-speaking Community
- In office 6 June 1984 – 3 December 1986
- Preceded by: position established
- Succeeded by: Joseph Maraite

Personal details
- Born: 11 June 1936 Raeren, Belgium
- Died: 24 November 2023 (aged 87)
- Party: PFF
- Occupation: Teacher

Bruno Fagnoul (11 June 1936 – 24 November 2023) was a Belgian teacher and politician of the Party for Freedom and Progress (PFF, now Perspectives. Freedom. Progress. party).

== Biography ==
Born in Raeren on 11 June 1936, Fagnoul first worked as a teacher in a primary school from 1974 to 1981. He was active in the ranks of the PFF and was elected to the Municipal Council of Raeren in 1976. In 1981, he worked for the Vice-Governor of Liège as a liaison for the German-speaking community. In December 1983, the community was officially established, and he became the first Minister-President. Following the first election in 1986, Joseph Maraite was elected Minister-President and Fagnoul joined his Cabinet as Community Minister of Training, Cultural Animation and Media. Following the 1988 municipal elections, he became mayor of Raeren and joined the Parliament of the German-speaking Community, leaving the community's executive. In December 2000, he retired from politics.

Bruno Fagnoul died on 24 November 2023, at the age of 87.
