= Émilie d'Oultremont =

Founder of the Sisters of Mary Reparatrix

Blessed Émilie d'Oultremont, S.M.R.
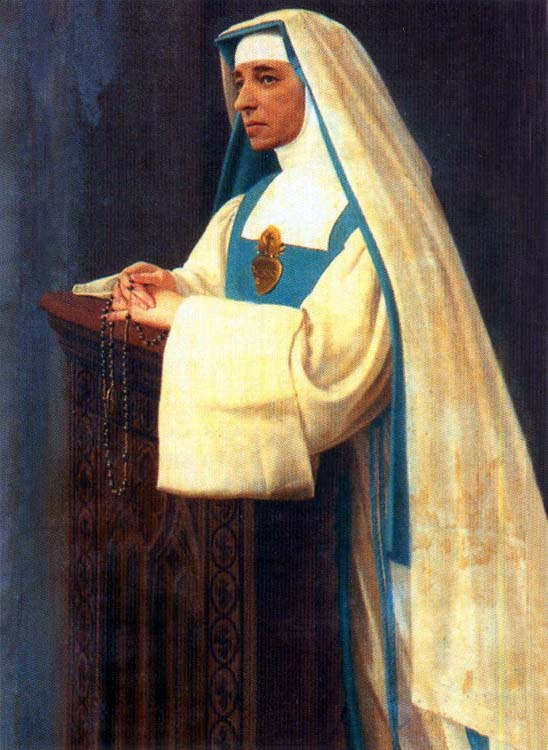

Religious
- Born: 11 October 1818; Wégimont Castle, Liège, Kingdom of the Netherlands
- Died: 22 February 1878 (aged 59); Florence, Kingdom of Italy
- Venerated in: Roman Catholic Church (Sisters of Mary Reparatrix)
- Beatified: 12 October 1997, Saint Peter's Square, Vatican City, by Pope John Paul II
- Feast: 22 February
- Attributes: Religious habit
- Patronage: Sisters of Mary Reparatrix

Émilie d'Oultremont (11 October 1818 – 22 February 1878) – in religion Marie of Jesus – was a Belgian Roman Catholic widow and later religious sister who founded the Sisters of Mary Reparatrix. She had four children and two of them, both daughters, joined her order and later predeceased her. She dedicated herself to the expansion of her order and sent religious to places such as England and India.

Pope John Paul II beatified her on 12 October 1997 in Saint Peter's Square.

== Life ==
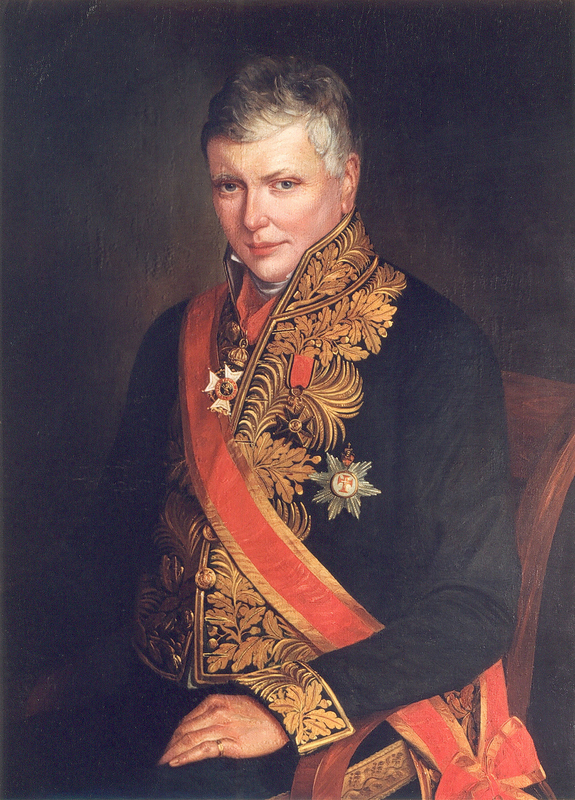
Her father.

=== Youth and marriage ===
Emilie was born to Count Émile d'Oultremont (21 July 1787 – 4 August 1851) and Marie-Charlotte de Lierneux de Presles (28 July 1785 – 14 September 1850) at the Wégimont Castle as a member of the House of d'Oultremont, which had ruled in the region for centuries. Her father helped to negotiate the independence of the Belgian people from the Kingdom of the Netherlands in 1830. Her two brothers were Charles (1819–1874) and Théodore (1 May 1815-???). Her father later served as the Belgian ambassador to the Vatican in Rome and she often accompanied him on his numerous visits across Europe.

In her childhood Emilie came to learn about Ignatius of Loyola, the founder of the Jesuits, and developed a devotion to him, as well as to both the Eucharist and the Sacred Heart of Jesus Christ. In 1833 she went to live in Rome with her parents due to her father's diplomatic assignment and later moved there again from 1839 to 1846 (with her husband in tow this time), while going back to Belgium each summer.

After Emilie turned eighteen, her parents began to arrange a marriage for her despite her hesitation, though she later relented. On 19 October 1837 she married Victor van der Linden d’Hooghvorst (1813 – 10 August 1847); the couple had four children (two males and two females). Her husband died of malaria on 10 August 1847 leaving her a widow. Her children were:

- Adrien (1838–1875)
- Edmond (1840–1890)
- Olympe (1843 – 14 December 1872)
- Marguerite (1845 – 23 January 1867)

Emilie then sent her sons to school in France while she and her daughters went to live in Paris, though one of her aunts invited her to their castle at Bauffe before she left in 1854. Her daughter Marguerite later died of tuberculosis in 1867 and Olympe followed on 14 December 1872.

=== Foundress ===
On 8 December 1854 (the day on which Pope Pius IX proclaimed the dogma of the Immaculate Conception) – while reflecting at a chapel in Bauffe – she described having experienced a vision of the Blessed Virgin Mary. Feeling that she had been called to religious life, she moved to Paris in 1854 and set up a small religious community in her home the following year. They were dedicated to providing spiritual retreats to women by which they could deepen their faith. In this, they were to be guided by the Spiritual Exercises of Loyola and Adoration of the Blessed Sacrament.

In 1857 Emilie established a convent at Strasbourg and saw the approval of the Sisters of Mary Reparatrix by Church authorities on 1 May 1857; she made her religious vows on 2 May 1858. Her two daughters joined that congregation while her two sons married.

In 1859 Emilie was asked to spread her congregation to India and so sent religious there in order to expand it. She later sent religious to England in 1862 and Mauritius in 1866 amongst other places; she also oversaw the transfer of the motherhouse from Strasbourg to Rome.

She died in 1878 in Florence while at her son Adrien's home. She has a shrine in the Santa Maria della Concezione dei Cappuccini in Rome. She was buried at the Church of Saint Bonaventura, Rome in Rome.

== Beatification ==
The beatification process opened in several places in several independent processes. The informative process opened in Liège on 16 April 1913 and concluded in December 1918 after World War I, since the conflict posed a slight disruption to the cause. Another process – one of two supplementary processes – opened on 14 July 1928 in Rome and closed on 5 March 1930 while the second of these spanned from 25 March 1934 to 15 June 1935 also in Rome. Theologians also assumed charge of all of her spiritual writings and approved them on 22 July 1925, while issuing further approval on two more occasions on 12 March 1930 and 1 February 1939 after a greater evaluation of them. The formal introduction to the cause came on 2 July 1941 under Pope Pius XII and she was titled henceforth as a Servant of God. An apostolic process was opened in Rome on 20 March 1942 and closed on 15 July 1943, while another was held in Liège from 24 July 1942 until 8 October 1943. An apostolic rogatory process was opened in Toulouse on 18 June 1942 and closed on 14 April 1943 while a second one opened in Madrid on 5 July 1942 and closed on 25 February 1943. The Congregation of Rites validated all these previous processes on 8 March 1946 while an ante-preparatory congregation approved the cause's direction on 18 March 1952 as did a preparatory committee on 9 April 1957.

The Positio was submitted decades later in 1989 to the Congregation for the Causes of Saints while theologians approved the contents of the dossier on 25 May 1993; the C.C.S. did so as well on 16 November 1993. Pope John Paul II declared her to be Venerable on 23 December 1993 after he confirmed that she had lived a model life of heroic virtue.

The miracle required for beatification was investigated and then validated on 12 February 1994 which allowed for a medical board to approve it on 5 October 1995 and for theologians to do so as well on 19 January 1996, while the C.C.S. issued approval on 18 June 1996. John Paul II issued his final approval to this on 17 December 1996 and beatified the late religious on 12 October 1997.
