= Rafaela Porras Ayllón =

Spanish religious sister and saint

Saint Rafaela Porras Ayllón
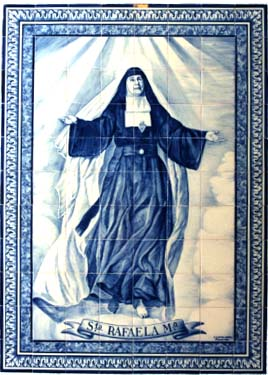

Virgin
- Born: 1 March 1850; Pedro Abad, Córdoba, Kingdom of Spain
- Died: 6 January 1925 (aged 74); Rome, Kingdom of Italy
- Venerated in: Roman Catholic Church
- Beatified: 18 May 1952, Saint Peter's Square, Vatican City by Pope Pius XII
- Canonized: 23 January 1977, Saint Peter's Square, Vatican City by Pope Paul VI
- Feast: 6 January / May 18
- Patronage: Handmaids of the Sacred Heart of Jesus

Rafaela Porras Ayllón, religious name Mary of the Sacred Heart of Jesus, (1 March 1850 – 6 January 1925) was a Spanish religious sister who established the Handmaids of the Sacred Heart of Jesus in conjunction with her sister Dolores. She devoted herself to the management of the congregation and resided in Rome until her death after her resignation as the congregation's superior in 1893.

Pope Paul VI canonised her in 1977; she is the patron of the congregation.

== Life ==
Rafaela Porras Ayllón was born in Pedro Abad on 1 March 1850 as the daughter of Ildefonso Porras (the mayor of Córdoba) and Rafaela Castilo as the tenth of thirteen children; she had one sole sister and eleven brothers. Her father died in 1854 while tending to victims of a cholera epidemic and her mother later followed in 1869. Her devotion to Jesus Christ during her childhood was ever so profound. She visited her parish on a frequent basis. The death of her mother served to motivate her more to devote herself to God.

She made a vow of perpetual chastity on 25 March 1865 on the Feast of the Annunciation. In February 1874 she and her sister María Dolores travelled to the convent of Poor Clares in their hometown in order to discern what their vocation was. The two sisters were clothed with the religious habit on 4 June 1874 and joined a group of 21 other novices.

In 1875, the two entered a religious congregation, the Sisters of Mary Reparatrix, and it was there that Ayllon assumed the religious name María of the Sacred Heart of Jesus. The pair remained there when the congregation moved to Seville; with the aid of Bishop Zeferino González y Díaz Tuñón founded the Institute of Adorers of the Blessed Sacrament and Daughters of Mary Immaculate – this would be the origin of the congregation that she and her sister would establish not long after. The group went to Madrid to make their vows in 1877.

With her sister and sixteen sisters the group moved to Andujar and then to Madrid; the congregation received the diocesan approval of the Archbishop of Toledo, Juan de la Cruz Ignacio Moreno y Maisonave, on 14 April 1877. She made brief vows on 8 June 1877 and then made her perpetual profession on 8 November 1888. The congregation received the papal decree of praise of Pope Leo XIII in 1886 at which point the congregation was officiated in the name of the Handmaids of the Sacred Heart of Jesus and issued his papal approval in 1887. The congregation would grow with new institutes being formed in Zaragoza (1885) and Bilbao (1886) in Spain and with a house in Rome (1892) being established as well. She was appointed as the Superior and remained in that post until 3 March 1893 when she resigned and anointed her sister as her successor; she then withdrew to the house in Rome and spent the remainder of her life there. She had resigned because of misunderstandings with her colleagues thus deemed it prudent to step aside from her position.

She died in her room in Rome in 1925. Her death came at the point where the benediction of the Eucharist took place in the convent chapel close to her room. She is buried in Rome at the institute based there.

== Sainthood ==
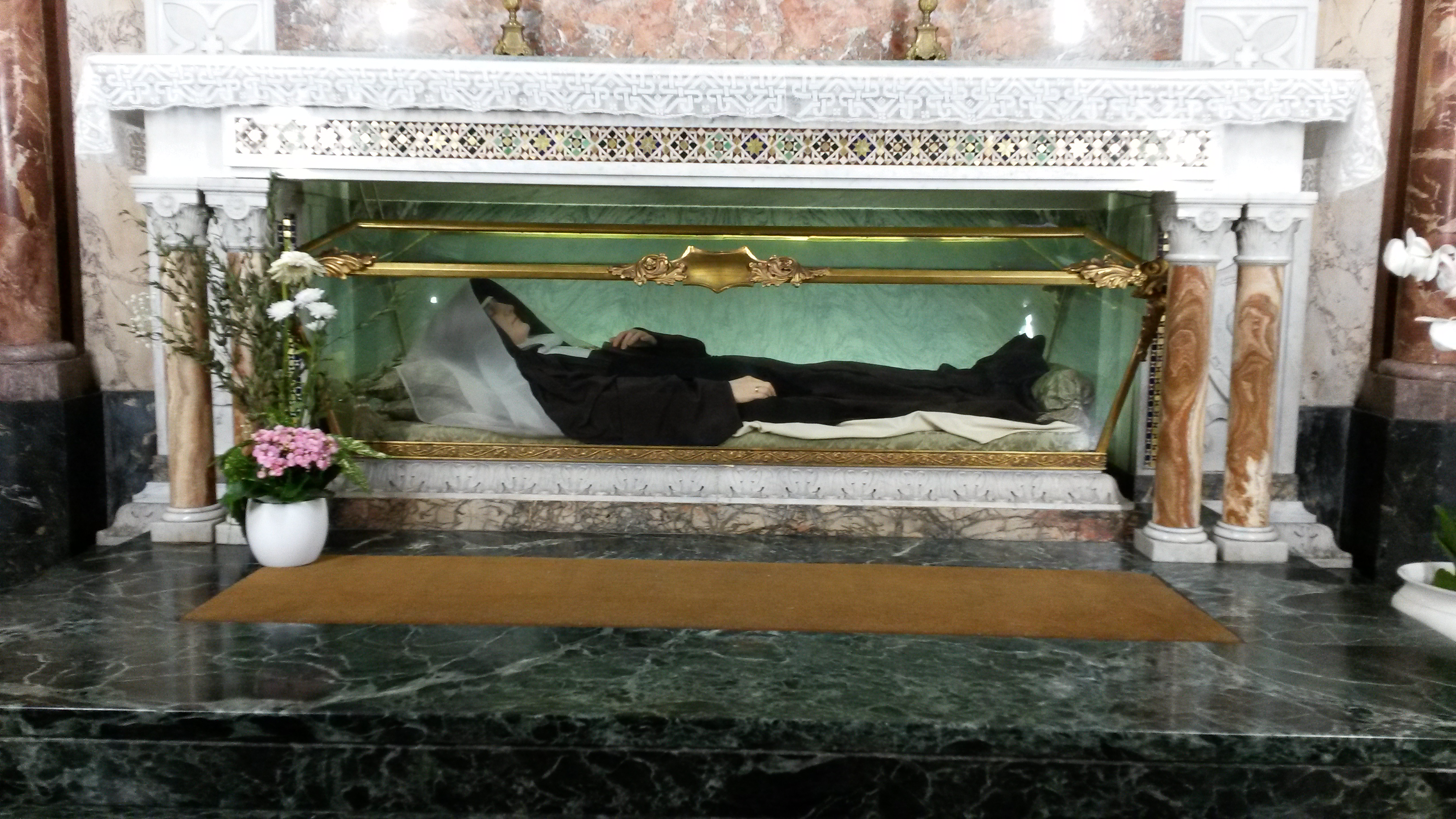
Tomb

The beatification process commenced in Rome with a diocesan process that spanned from 1 February 1936 until 1938 and the process saw the collection of documentation pertaining to her life as well as collating a range of testimonies from those who knew her. The decree on her writings was granted on 21 September 1938 after all of her writings were placed in the care of theologians for investigation in order to ensure that her written works did not contradict Church doctrine.

These processes took place despite the fact that the Congregation of Rites did not grant their formal approval to the initiation of the cause until 22 November 1939 which granted her the title Servant of God and allowed for another process to open to continue the work of the first; this spanned from 1940 until 1941 and both processes were ratified in 1943.

She was proclaimed to be venerable on 13 May 1949 after Pope Pius XII recognized the fact that she had indeed lived a model and pious life of heroic virtue. Pope Pius presided over her beatification on 18 May 1952 after he approved two healings deemed to be miracles wrought from her direct intercession. The third miracle was investigated in Huelva in 1974 and once completed was ratified on 15 November 1974. The miracle received papal approval on 13 November 1976 and allowed for Pope Paul VI to canonize on 23 January 1977. The miracle in question was the healing of the nun Maria of the Incarnation García Gallardo.
