= List of protected heritage sites in Soumagne =

This table shows an overview of the protected heritage sites in the Walloon town Soumagne. This list is part of Belgium's national heritage.

Object	Year/architect	Town/section	Address	Coordinates	Number^{?}	Image
Church of Saint-Lambert ^{(nl)} ^{(fr)}		Soumagne	Soumagne	50.612309°N 5.748051°E	62099-CLT-0001-01 Info	Kerk Saint-Lambert
Former boundary stone "Belle Pierre" on the aqueduct of the stream, with the name "ruisseau du Pont Clory" ^{(nl)} ^{(fr)}		Soumagne		50.617218°N 5.764576°E	62099-CLT-0002-01 Info	Voormalige grenssteen "Belle Pierre" op het aquaduct van de stroom, met de naam "ruisseau du Pont Clory"
Building ^{(nl)} ^{(fr)}		Soumagne	rue Pierre Curie n°23 te Soumagne	50.612077°N 5.747666°E	62099-CLT-0003-01 Info	
House ^{(nl)} ^{(fr)}		Soumagne	chaussée de Liège n°87 te Ayeneux	50.608493°N 5.714013°E	62099-CLT-0004-01 Info	
Church of Cerexhe-Heuseux ^{(nl)} ^{(fr)}		Soumagne		50.650465°N 5.729302°E	62099-CLT-0005-01 Info	Kerk van Cerexhe-Heuseux
The old linden tree in the shade of the old chapel of Evegnée ^{(nl)} ^{(fr)}		Soumagne		50.641835°N 5.707439°E	62099-CLT-0006-01 Info	De oude linde in de schaduw van de oude kapel van Evegnée
Chapel of Notre Dame ^{(nl)} ^{(fr)}		Soumagne	Evegnée	50.642024°N 5.707659°E	62099-CLT-0007-01 Info	Kapel Notre-Dame
Church of Saint-Job, furniture, organs, and the convent wall around the cemetery ^{(nl)} ^{(fr)}		Soumagne	Melen	50.646660°N 5.736595°E	62099-CLT-0008-01 Info	Kerk Saint-Job, meubels, orgels en de kloostermuur rond het kerkhof
ridge (pont) in 1677 behind the choir of the church of Soumagne ^{(nl)} ^{(fr)}		Soumagne	Soumagne	50.612523°N 5.749513°E	62099-CLT-0011-01 Info	
Part of the wall that surrounds the cemetery at the Church of Saint-Lambert, built in stone with crosses and embedded calvary and the disused cemetery (which is now converted into a public park) ^{(nl)} ^{(fr)}		Soumagne		50.612115°N 5.748137°E	62099-CLT-0012-01 Info	
The "Belle Fleur" ^{(nl)} ^{(fr)}		Soumagne	Soumagne	50.619315°N 5.738006°E	62099-CLT-0014-01 Info	De "Belle Fleur"
Farmhouse ^{(nl)} ^{(fr)}		Soumagne	rue Rafhay n°75 (jadis n°39) te Haute-Rafhay te savoir	50.602412°N 5.752940°E	62099-CLT-0016-01 Info	

== See also ==
- List of protected heritage sites in Liège (province)
- Soumagne
