= Vlattenhaus =

Historic building in Eynatten, Belgium

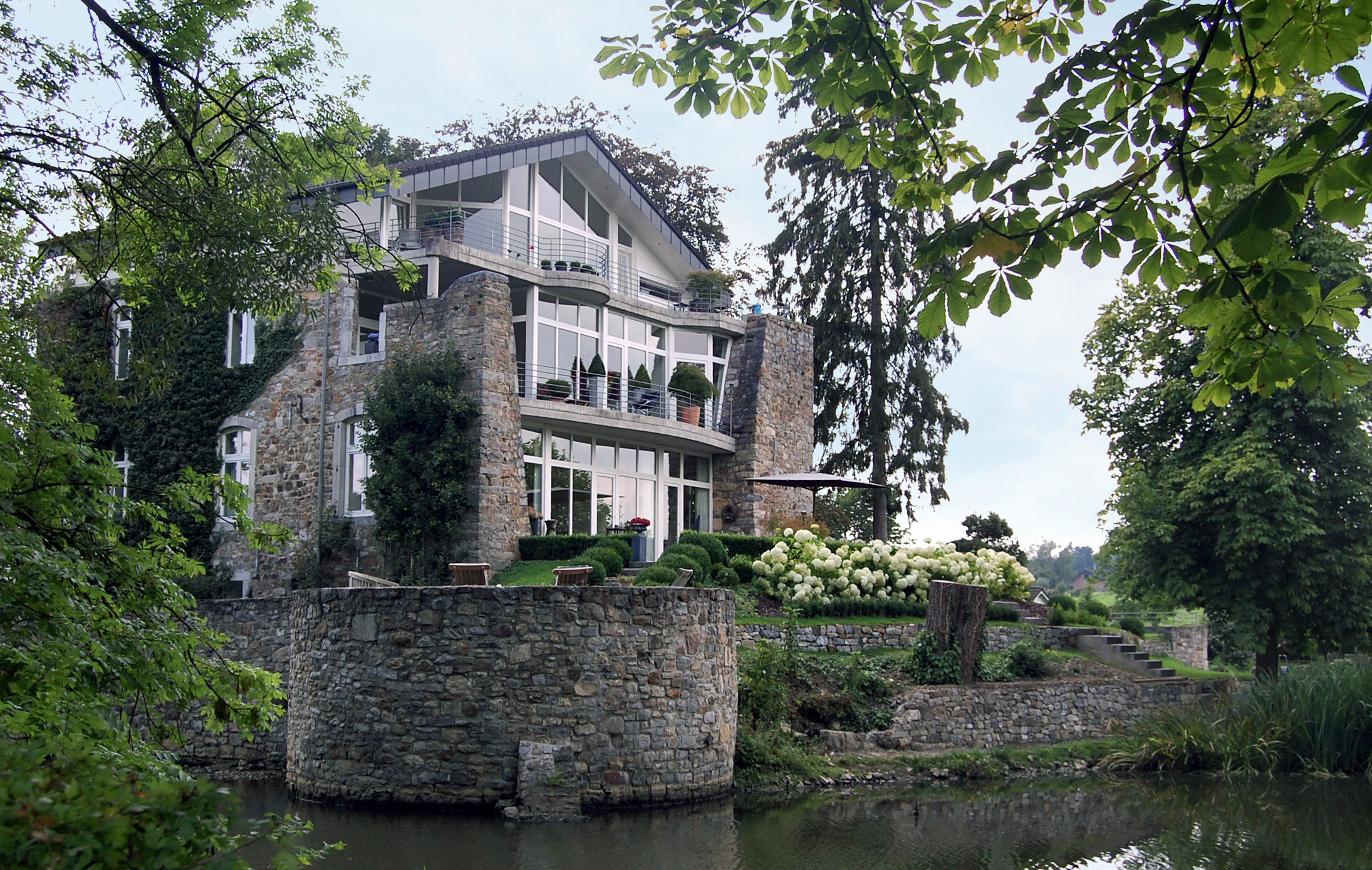
Vlattenhaus

The Vlattenhaus is a castle-like building in the town of Eynatten, belonging to the Belgian municipality of Raeren, located on Hauseter Straße, just 200 meters away from Amstenrath Castle.

== History ==
In the 2nd half of the 14th century, the Vlattenhaus was built by Peter of Eynatten, the brother of Johann of Eynatten who had a predecessor of the adjacent castle built. On the site of the Vlattenhaus there was probably previously a feudal farm of the estate Amstenrath. In 1434 the male line of the family died out and the house, through marriage, came into other hands. In 1728 the house, which was rather dilapidated at the time, was given to the Jesuits. They had it demolished to build a smaller house in its place. The moats were also turned into fishponds.

In 1773, the order was dissolved, and the house was sold again to a private individual. Finally, after World War I, when the house entered Belgian territory, the German owners expropriated it, and it was used as barracks and as a factory. The house was restored in 1942, but was severely damaged on September 12, 1944, in the fighting between advancing Americans and retreating German troops. In the 1960s, the ruins were purchased by the Franssen van Cortenbach family, who also already owned the adjacent castle. In the late 1990s, the house was converted and modernized into a housing complex.

== Building ==
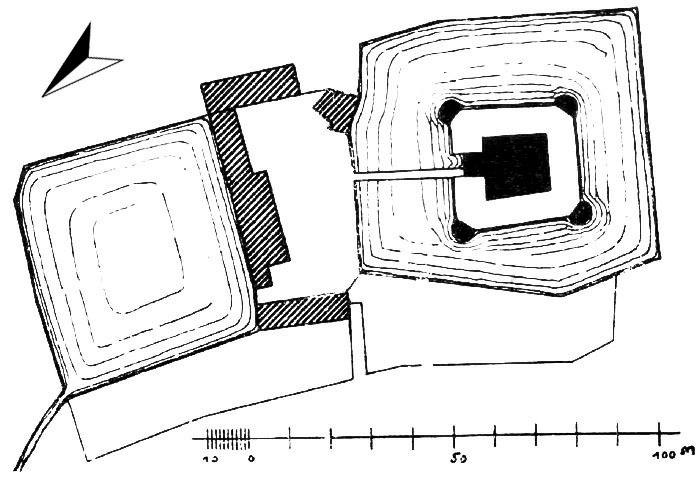
Site plan of the Vlattenhaus around 1912

This is a three-story building on a square plan, located on a walled island. This island is formed by quarry stone walls, which measure 30 x 30 meters and at the four corners still contain the lower layers of round towers. It constitutes the remnant of the former castle. Outside the castle island are the farm buildings of the forecourt, which are made of quarry stone. One of them has wall anchors showing the year 1781.

== Bibliography ==
- Kupka, Andreas (2016). "Castles in the German-speaking Community of Belgium - some selected examples". Wartburg Society for the Research of Castles and Palaces. Petersberg. pp. 369–379. ISBN 978-3-7319-0329-1.
- Minke, Alfred (2013). Castles, palaces and a "quarter" in the Duchy of Limburg. In: Eynatten Tourist Office (ed.): 800 years of Eynatten. Contributions to village history. Eynatten: Eynatten. pp. 13–17.
- Müllender, Fabrice (2013). Nobility - coats of arms - castles. In: Eynatten Tourist Office (ed.): 800 years of Eynatten. Contributions to village history. pp. 50–51.
- Nimax, Manfred (2010). Castles, palaces, mansions in East Belgium (3rd ed.). pp. 10–12. ISBN 978-3-00-020297-1.
- Poswick, Guy (1951). Les Delices du Limbourg. Poswick, Verviers.: Plumhans. pp. 301–306.
- Reiners, Heribert (1982). The art monuments of Eupen-Malmedy. Schwann, Düsseldorf.: Pädagogischer Verlag Schwann. pp. 118–119. ISBN 3-590-32117-2.
- Administration of the German-speaking Community (ed.): Raeren (= directory of monuments. Volume 8). Eupen: Administration of the German-speaking Community. 1990. pp. 320–321.
