= Handmaids of the Sacred Heart of Jesus =

Roman Catholic religious institute

Institute of the Handmaids of the Sacred Heart of Jesus
- Abbreviation: A.C.I. or A.C.J.
- Type: Roman Catholic religious order
- Location: Rome, Italy
- Superior General: Sister Rosario Fernandez-Villarán, aci
- Key people: Saint Raphaela Maria Porras y Ayllon, A.C.J., foundress
- Website: Handmaids of the Sacred Heart of Jesus

The Handmaids of the Sacred Heart of Jesus (Latin: Ancillae Cordis Iesu; Spanish: Esclavas del Sagrado Corazón de Jesús) is a Roman Catholic religious institute that was founded in Madrid, Spain, in 1877 by two sisters, María Dolores and Raphaela Maria Porras y Ayllon. Rafaela Maria became its first superior general in 1877 and in the same year, the congregation received papal approval. The focus of the institute is on "children's education and helping at retreats", reflected in its 130 convents in 27 countries, and the number of schools that it has founded.

Members of the institute carry the letters A.C.I. or A.C.J., after their names.

== History ==
Rafaela Porras Ayllón was born in Pedro Abad, Spain, on March 1, 1850. She was the youngest of thirteen children of well-to-do, pious parents, Ildefonso and Rafaela (Ayllón y Castillo) Porras. She and her sister, María Dolores, entered the novitiate of the Sisters of Mary Reparatrix, where Dolores was given the name of Sister María del Pilar. Church authorities and the religious community mission had some disagreements about their future role as educators in Córdoba, and the sisters decided to leave the diocese. Raphaela, her sister and some of the other novices remained there to form a new community, and subsequently went to Madrid. In 1877, under the authority of the Cardinal Archbishop of Toledo, the sisters took their vows and founded the Handmaids of the Sacred Heart of Jesus.

In 1886, receiving a Decree of Praise from the Vatican, the sisters became the Institute of Handmaids of the Sacred Heart of Jesus with Raphaela at its head. Following the spirituality of Saint Ignatius of Loyola, the community spread quickly throughout Spain.

Rafaela resigned as the first Superior General in 1893, spending the next 32 years in prayer and contemplation at the congregation's house in Rome. She died in Rome, on 6 January 1925. Rafaela Maria Porras y Ayllon was beatified by Pope Pius XII in 1952 and canonized in 1977 by Pope Paul VI. She is known as Saint Raphaela Mary of the Sacred Heart.

== Congregation ==
The congregation, given the name "Handmaids", in honor of the Blessed Virgin Mary, quickly spread to other cities in Spain, and by 1921 the congregation had communities in other countries as well, in Italy, Argentina, England, Peru, and Cuba. In 1926 the congregation made foundations in Bolivia, Chile, and the US. As of 2019, there were approximately 1,000 members of the institute in 130 convents in 23 countries. The General Curia is in Rome.

The congregation is a participant in UNANIMA International, a non-governmental organization (NGO) advocating on behalf of women and children (particularly those living in poverty), immigrants and refugees, and the environment.

=== Atlantic Europe Province ===
The Atlantic Europe Province includes those convents in England, Ireland, Portugal, and France. The provincial house is in Lisbon.

=== United States ===
In 1926, the Handmaids of the Sacred Heart of Jesus came to Philadelphia from Rome at the invitation of Cardinal Dennis Dougherty. The Sisters opened a small chapel on 34th Street, near the University of Pennsylvania and began to teach classes in business skills, languages and the arts. These classes were well attended both by the women students at the university and by working women.

In 1947 the Handmaids of the Sacred Heart opened a private elementary school for girls in Wyncote, Pennsylvania. The school was named Ancillae Academy, from the Latin word for handmaid. In 1957, the Handmaids started Assumpta Academy, a boys' school named after Mother Assumption, a founding sister. In 1969, the two merged to become Ancillae Assumpta Academy.

The Handmaids operate the Saint Raphaela Center in Haverford, Pennsylvania, are engaged in pastoral ministry in Miami, Florida, and work with immigrants in Athens, Georgia.

=== Philippines ===
The Congregation came to the Philippines in 1966 and established schools. The Santa Rafaela Maria School Quezon City, started its operation in 1976.

=== India ===
The Handmaids of the Sacred Heart of Jesus arrived in Mumbai in 1968 where they opened homes for the disabled, taught nursing courses, and provided aid to the poor.

== Schools founded by the institute ==
=== Spain ===
Madrid, Salamanca and Valladolid

=== United States ===
- Ancillae Assumpta Academy
- Ancilla Domini Academy

=== Portugal ===
- Portugal Province
- Oporto College

=== Argentina ===
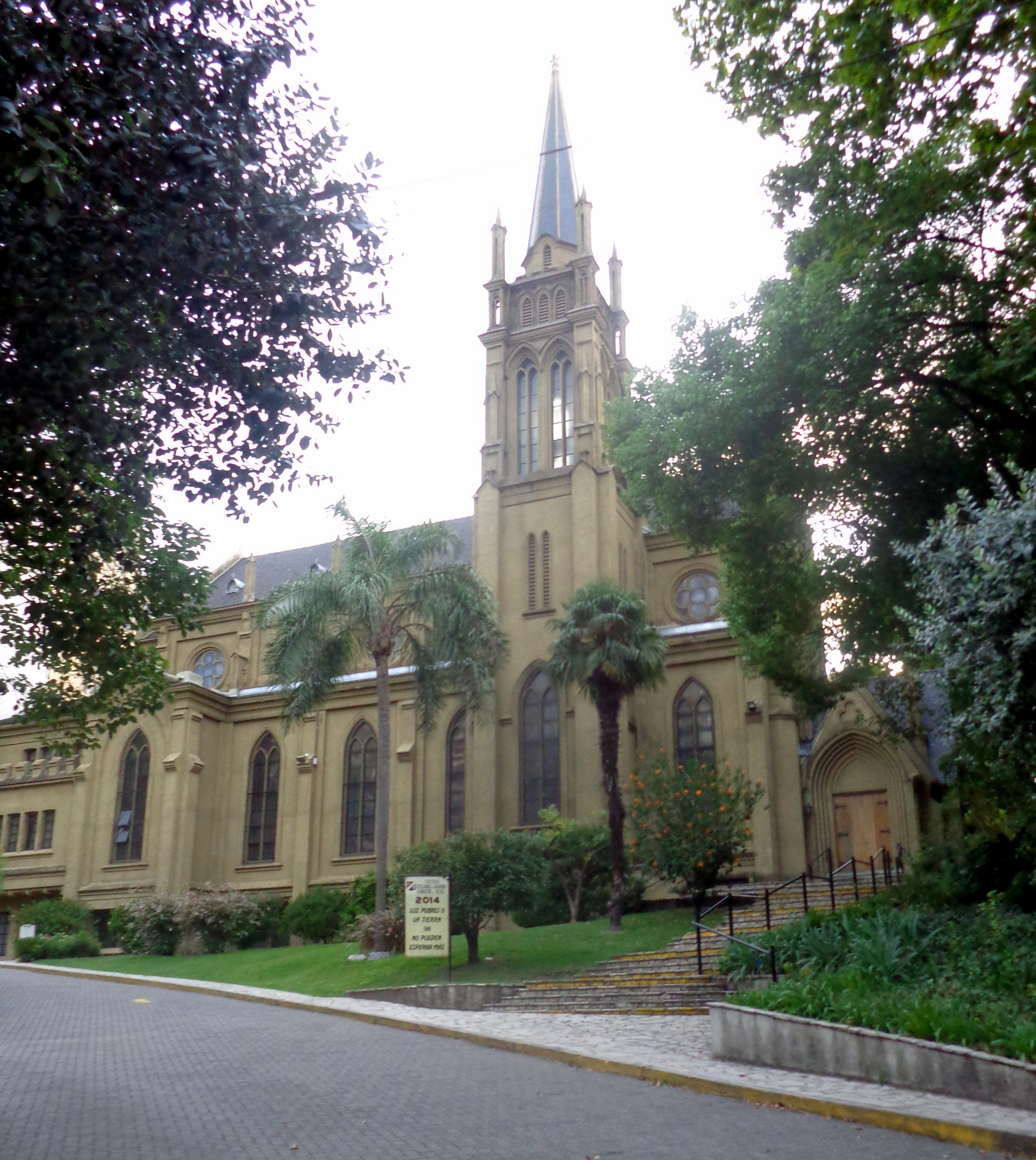
Colegio Catolico Esclavas del Sagrado Corazon de Jesus, Buenos Aires

Colegio Catolico Esclavas del Sagrado Corazon de Jesus, Buenos Aires

=== Bolivia ===
- Colegio Esclavas del Sagrado Corazón de Jesús, Cochabamba

=== Chile ===
- Colegio Universitario Inglés

=== Japan ===
- Seisen International School
- Seisen Junior and Senior High School, Kanagawa Prefecture
- Seisen University (Tokyo)
- Seisen Jogakuin College, Nagano Prefecture

=== Philippines ===
- Sta. Rafaela Maria School of Quezon City
- Sta. Rafaela Maria School of Naga City, Incorporated.

=== Panamá ===
- Colegio Las Esclavas del Sagrado Corazón de Jesús, Ciudad de Panamá

=== United Kingdom ===
- Saint Christina's School, London
- Saint Raphaela's Secondary School, Dublin
