= Lorimer Park =

Park in Pennsylvania, United States

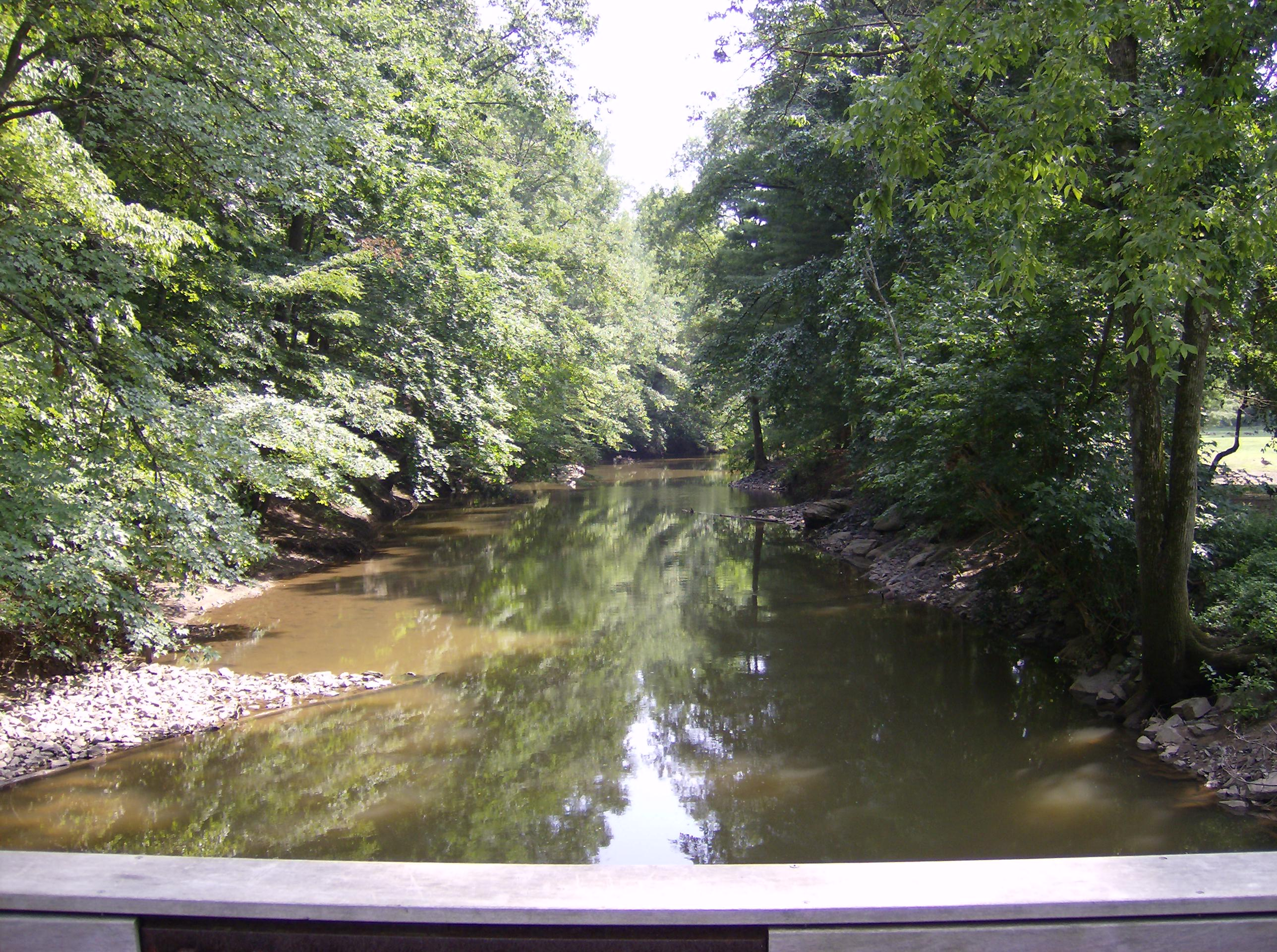
- The Pennypack Creek from a bridge in Lorimer Park

- Location within Pennsylvania
- Type: County park
- Location: Abington Township, Montgomery County, Pennsylvania
- Coordinates: 40.0957°N 75.0730°W
- Area: 230 acres (93 hectares)
- Created: 1938
- Open: Daily, 7 AM – Sunset

Lorimer Park is a 230-acre (0.93 km^{2}) public park in Abington Township, Pennsylvania. The park, a bequest from George Horace Lorimer (long-time editor-in-chief of The Saturday Evening Post), is connected to Pennypack Park in Philadelphia County, and the Pennypack Creek runs through both parks. The park borders Fox Chase Farm, one of only two remaining active farms in Philadelphia County.
