= List of protected heritage sites in Raeren =

This table shows an overview of the protected heritage sites in the Walloon town Raeren. This list is part of Belgium's national heritage.

Object	Year/architect	Town/section	Address	Coordinates	Number	Image
Eynatten village center ^{(nl)} ^{(de)}		Raeren		50.692993°N 6.079779°E	31450 Info	Eynatten village center
St. Roch Chapel and surroundings ^{(nl)} ^{(de)}		Raeren		50.701402°N 6.064134°E	31383 Info	St. Roch Chapel and surroundings
Cross "Hauseter Feld" ^{(nl)} ^{(de)}		Raeren		50.695813°N 6.053890°E	31384 Info	Cross "Hauseter Feld"
Zyklopensteine with surroundings ^{(nl)} ^{(de)}		Raeren		50.720194°N 6.094579°E	31434 Info	Zyklopensteine with surroundings
St. Nicholas Church ^{(nl)} ^{(de)}		Raeren		50.675818°N 6.110876°E	31385 Info	St. Nicholas Church
St. Anne Chapel ^{(nl)} ^{(de)}		Raeren		50.677985°N 6.125515°E	31398 Info	St. Anne Chapel
Cross "Kule Kreuz" ^{(nl)} ^{(de)}		Raeren		50.675275°N 6.110727°E	31449 Info	Cross "Kule Kreuz"
Raeren Castle: tower and north wall with gate ^{(nl)} ^{(de)}		Raeren		50.678749°N 6.120609°E	31399 Info	Raeren Castle: tower and north wall with gate
Raeren house: walls, roof, moat and bridge ^{(nl)} ^{(de)}		Raeren		50.678182°N 6.121958°E	31400 Info	Raeren house: walls, roof, moat and bridge
Amstenrath house and farm buildings (facades and roofs) and the cobblestone courtyard ^{(nl)} ^{(de)}		Raeren		50.694392°N 6.082290°E	31369 Info	Amstenrath house and farm buildings (facades and roofs) and the cobblestone courtyard
"Hohe Brücke" area ^{(nl)} ^{(de)}		Raeren		50.677405°N 6.118226°E	31404 Info	"Hohe Brücke" area
Knoppenburg: two round towers, facades and roofs of the west wing and east wing, walls and roof of the residential building (except the two adjoining buildings on either side) and surroundings ^{(nl)} ^{(de)}		Raeren		50.667161°N 6.099568°E	31401 Info	Knoppenburg: two round towers, facades and roofs of the west wing and east wing, walls and roof of the residential building (except the two adjoining buildings on either side) and surroundings
House: walls and roof ^{(nl)} ^{(de)}		Raeren	Lichtenbuscher Strasse 19	50.693191°N 6.084757°E	31371 Info	House: walls and roof
"Der Vennbusch" ^{(nl)} ^{(de)}		Raeren		50.661251°N 6.120078°E	31058 Info	"Der Vennbusch"
Hof Meurisse: walls, roofs, and cobblestone courtyard ^{(nl)} ^{(de)}		Raeren		50.681068°N 6.142895°E	31402 Info	Hof Meurisse: walls, roofs, and cobblestone courtyard
House: walls and roof, fence wall with blue stone pillars and wrought iron gate ^{(nl)} ^{(de)}		Raeren	Eupener Strasse 8	50.691991°N 6.082626°E	31376 Info	House: walls and roof, fence wall with blue stone pillars and wrought iron gate
Bergschied house: walls and roof of the main house and entrance gate ^{(nl)} ^{(de)}		Raeren		50.671330°N 6.116574°E	31403 Info	Bergschied house: walls and roof of the main house and entrance gate
Raaff Castle: The ruins of the tower ^{(nl)} ^{(de)}		Raeren	Berlotte	50.697840°N 6.102505°E	31381 Info	Raaff Castle: The ruins of the tower
Court Stester: walls and roofs ^{(nl)} ^{(de)}		Raeren	Berlotte	50.698752°N 6.106124°E	31382 Info	Court Stester: walls and roofs
Brandheidchen ^{(nl)} ^{(de)}		Raeren		50.704086°N 6.073438°E	31057 Info	Brandheidchen
Der Leuff: walls and roof, and the stables: facades and roof ^{(nl)} ^{(de)}		Raeren		50.692260°N 6.083049°E	32237 Info	Der Leuff: walls and roof, and the stables: facades and roof
Saxby signal-box of former train station including the station and technical equipment ^{(de)}		Raeren		50.664464°N 6.125862°E	40366 Info	Saxby signal-box of former train station including the station and technical equipment

== See also ==
- Lists of protected heritage sites in the German-speaking Community of Belgium
- List of protected heritage sites in Liège (province)
- Raeren
