= Ancillae Assumpta Academy =

Coordinates: 40.0909°N 75.1568°W

Ancillae-Assumpta Academy

Location
- 2025 Church Road; Wyncote, (Montgomery County), Pennsylvania 19095

Information
- Religious affiliation: Roman Catholic
- Established: 1969
- Director: Amy Lintner
- Principal: Sr. Maureen Gillespie
- Grades: Pre-K to 8th
- Campus size: 10 acres
- Website: www.ancillae.org

Ancillae-Assumpta Academy is a co-educational school for students in Pre-school through grade 8 in Wyncote, Pennsylvania, United States.

== History ==
In 1946 the Handmaids of the Sacred Heart began kindergarten classes at Church Road in Wyncote, Pennsylvania. The following year they opened a private elementary school for girls named Ancillae Academy, from the Latin word for handmaid. In 1957, the Handmaids founded Assumpta Academy, a boys' school named after Mother Assumption Escauriaza, a founding sister.

In 1969, the two merged to become Ancillae-Assumpta Academy. The school is located on the former estate of the late George Horace Lorimer, longtime editor of the Saturday Evening Post and president and chairman of the Curtis Publishing Company.

== Accreditation ==
Ancillae-Assumpta is accredited by the Commission on Elementary Schools of the Middle States Association of Colleges and Schools since 1981. The current accreditation is for a period of seven years from December 2012 until December 2019. This is the fourth reaccreditation for the school. The previous reaccreditations were in 1990 and 2001.
