= Sisters of Mary Reparatrix =

Roman Catholic religious institute

- Sœurs de Marie Reparatrice
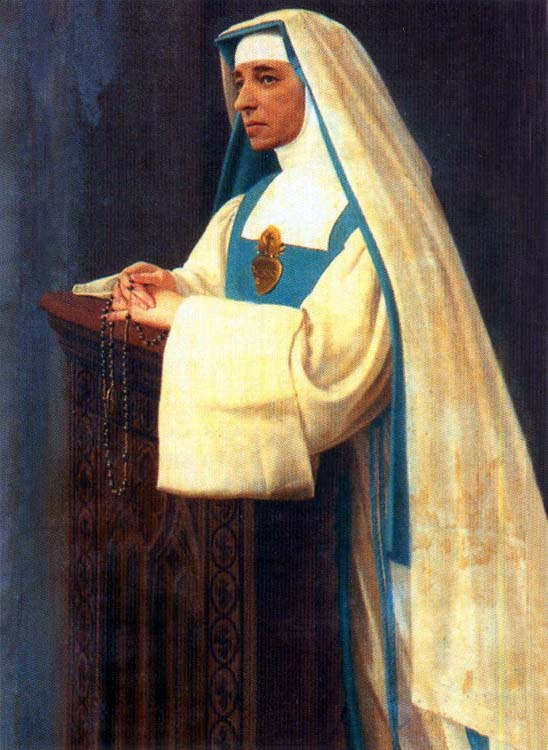
- Blessed Mary of Jesus foundress of the congregation
- Abbreviation: SMR
- Formation: 1857; 169 years ago
- Founder: Émilie d'Oultremont (Blessed Mary of Jesus, SMR)
- Founded at: Strasbourg, France
- Type: Centralized Religious Institute of Consecrated Life of Pontifical Right for Women
- Headquarters: General Motherhouse; Via dei Lucchesi, 3; 00187 Rome, Italy
- Superior General: Aurora Torres, SMR
- Website: www.smr.org

The Sisters of Mary Reparatrix (French: Sœurs de Marie Reparatrice) are a religious institute of women in the Catholic Church which was founded in France in 1857. Their way of life has been to combine adoration of God with the evangelization of society, especially among women.

== Origins ==
The foundress of the congregation was Mary of Jesus, born Émilie d'Oultremont de Warfusée, a member of a prominent Belgian Catholic family. While she was a child, her father was appointed as the Belgian Ambassador to the Holy See in Rome.

As a teenager, d'Oultremont was drawn to the consecrated life of a religious sister, but, in obedience to her family, she wed at the age of 19. Though it was an arranged marriage, she and her husband fell deeply in love. She lived a happy life with her husband, while both being a member of Roman society and serving the poor of the city. She and her husband had four children before his untimely death in 1847 due to malaria.

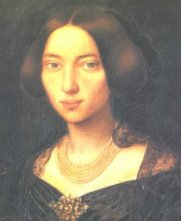
Emilie d'Oultremont

The young widow d'Hooghvorst, who had already experienced a mystical vision of God while attending a ball, was drawn more deeply into the spiritual life. With the loss of both her parents by 1851, she decided to withdraw from the demands of her wider family and, in 1854, moved to France with her children. Before her departure, she accepted the invitation of an aunt to visit her at her residence in the Castle of Bauffe, near Chièvres. It was in the chapel of that castle that Emilie had another vision which was to change her life. It occurred on 8 December 1854, the same day as Pope Pius IX declared the doctrine of the Immaculate Conception to be a dogma of the Catholic Church.

What d'Hooghvorst experienced in that little chapel was later described by her as a personal encounter with Mary, who invited her to "make reparation" to her son for the world, and to love him and all Christians "with that delicacy of love that is found in a mother's heart". In keeping with the theology of the time, she translated this call into one of Eucharistic adoration. She had, however, long been influenced by Ignatian spirituality from her guidance by a number of Jesuit priests during her teenage years and this influenced her thoughts about how she might carry out the element of service to others.

D'Hooghvorst began to share her experience and soon drew a group of young women of diverse nationalities who wished to share in this call. The first community of the new congregation was opened in Strasbourg on 1 May 1857. They adopted a white religious habit with a blue scapular, and d'Hooghvorst took the religious name Mary of Jesus.

From the start, a part of the day of each sister's life was dedicated to adoration before the Blessed Sacrament, which would be done in pairs, and the primary ministry of the community was conducting retreats for women following the Spiritual Exercises of Ignatius Loyola.

== Expansion and division ==
Communities of the congregation began to be established throughout France, the first being in Paris. By the time of her death in Florence, Italy, in 1878, Mary of Jesus had overseen the founding of 20 communities of the sisters in India, England, Belgium, La Reunion, Italy, Mauritius, Ireland and Spain.

=== India ===
Within two years of their foundation, the Sisters of Mary Repartrix were invited to establish a community in India, in the Apostolic Vicariate of Madurai, which had been confided by the Holy See to the care of the Society of Jesus. The sisters were to have the task of the formation of a native congregation of religious sisters, as well as being involved in other apostolic activities. This was their first expansion outside France.

Seven sisters sailed from the port of Marseille in November 1859. A foundation was made in Trichinopoly, followed in 1863 in Tuticorin and in 1864 in Adeilkalabouram. Apart from the native Indian sisters, they primarily worked with the local widows of the region. A young novice, Mary of the Passion, was sent to this mission in 1865, where, due to the trust she had gained with the foundress, she was immediately appointed as the Provincial Superior of the communities in India after she professed her religious vows.

In 1874 a new house was founded in Ootacamund, which re-ignited a series of disputes which had previously taken place in the Indian convents. This led to the departure of Mary of the Passion and 19 of the other sisters from that congregation. By January 1877, these 20 women had obtained papal approval to form a new congregation, the Franciscan Missionaries of Mary, which brought medical care to the women of India, otherwise prevented from receiving this at the hands of male physicians. As of 2011, the Franciscan Missionaries of Mary formed the fifth largest religious institute for women in the Catholic Church, with 6,698 members.

This was not the only offshoot of the congregation. The Handmaids of the Sacred Heart of Jesus were founded in Spain that same year by two sisters who had joined the congregation shortly before.

=== United States ===
In 1908, the sisters began a community on the lower west side of Manhattan, and took up residence at the former St. Leo's Church on West 28th Street. Retreat work remains a significant part of their ministry, as well as visiting the sick, and making altar bread. As of 2024, some ten sisters remain in the United States, with communities in Michigan and Queens, New York.

== Current status ==
The sisters followed the directives of the Second Vatican Council which took place in the 1960s and looked at their origins in renewing their way of life for modern times. As a result, they opted to change from living in cloistered monasteries to small communities in socially marginal areas. They also expanded their mission from an exclusive focus on retreats to include training programs for the poor. In Entebbe, Uganda the sisters operate a guest house and spirituality center. In 2017, the community celebrated their centennial anniversary of ministry in Uganda.

At present there are communities of the Sisters of Mary Reparatrix in 22 nations throughout Europe, Africa and both North and South America. Total as of December 31, 2016 are as follows: Total 525 Sisters of which 483 are Perpetual professed sisters, 34 Temporary professed sisters, 8 Novices (6:Madagascar, 1: Uganda, 1 Congo). Opening of houses are in Mexico in Guadalajara-Nueva Santa Maria, on March 17, 2016, and in San Luis Potosí-Cristo Misionero, on September 15, 2016. In Kenya, the sisters are involved in running a center where for deprived girls are taught embroidering, tailoring, hair dressing, food nutrition and other short courses.
