= Raeren =

Municipality in the German-speaking Community of Belgium

- Municipality
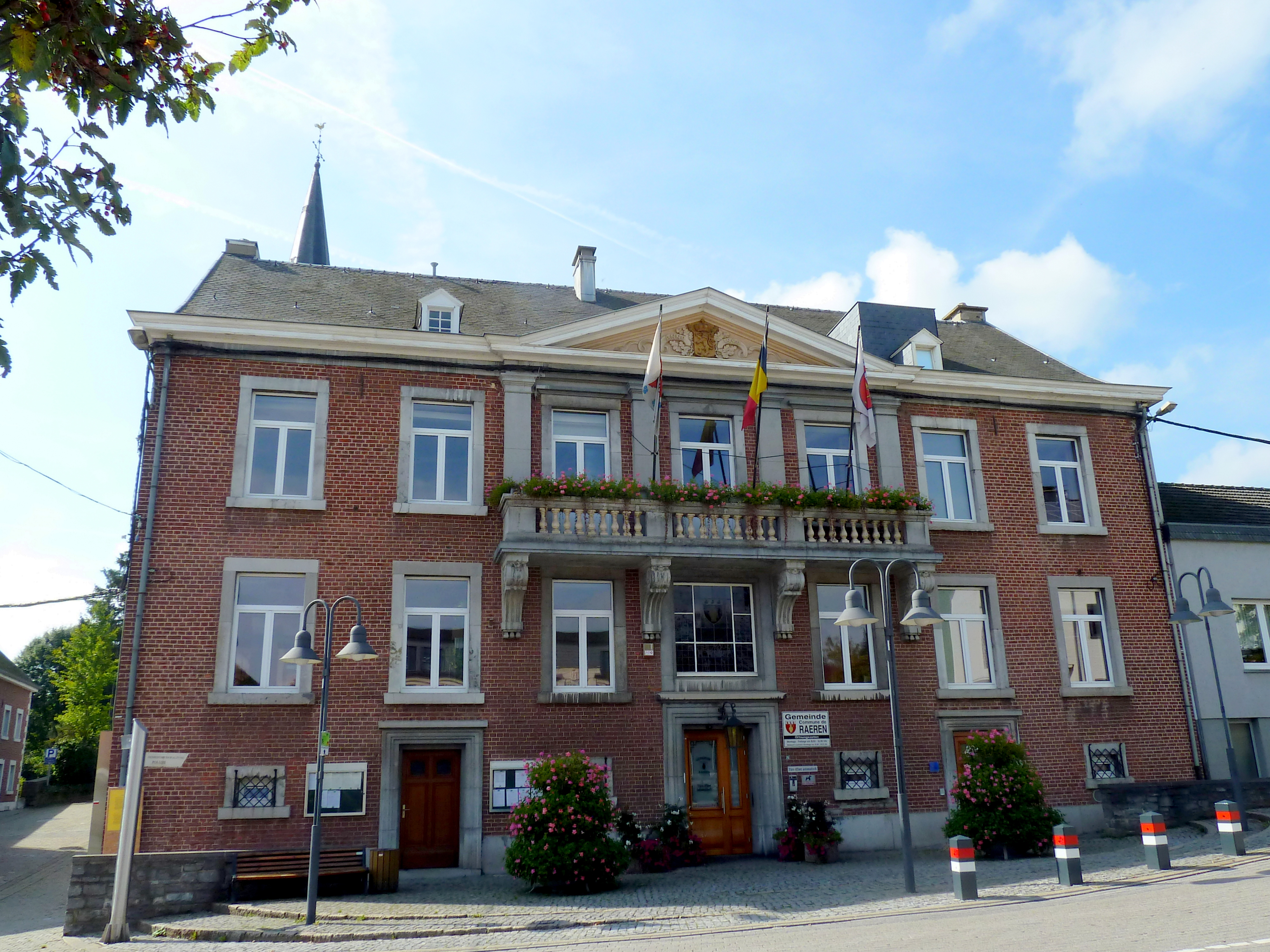
- Raeren town hall

- Flag Coat of arms

- Location of Raeren in the province of Liège
- Interactive map of Raeren
- Location in Belgium
- Coordinates: 50°41′N 06°07′E
- Country: Belgium
- Community: German-speaking Community of Belgium
- Region: Wallonia
- Province: Liège
- Arrondissement: Verviers

Government
  - Mayor: Mario Pitz
  - Governing party: Mit Uns - Ecolo

Area
  - Total: 72.81 km^{2} (28.11 sq mi)

Population (2018-01-01)
  - Total: 10,707
  - Density: 147.1/km^{2} (380.9/sq mi)
- Postal codes: 4730–4731
- NIS code: 63061
- Area codes: 087
- Website: www.raeren.be

Raeren (German pronunciation: [ˈʁaːʁən]) is a municipality of the German speaking community of Belgium located in the Walloon province of Liège. It was part of Germany until the First World War, after which it became part of Belgium. It is one of several towns in eastern Belgium which predominantly speak German.

On 1 January 2006, Raeren had a total population of 10,091. The total area is 74.21 km^{2} which gives a population density of 136 inhabitants per km^{2}. The municipality consists of the following sub-municipalities: Eynatten, Hauset, and Raeren proper.

Mathias Cormann, the former Minister for Finance of Australia and current Secretary-General of the OECD, was raised in Raeren.

== Transportation ==
Its Raeren railway station was the hub and headquarters of the Vennbahn railway.

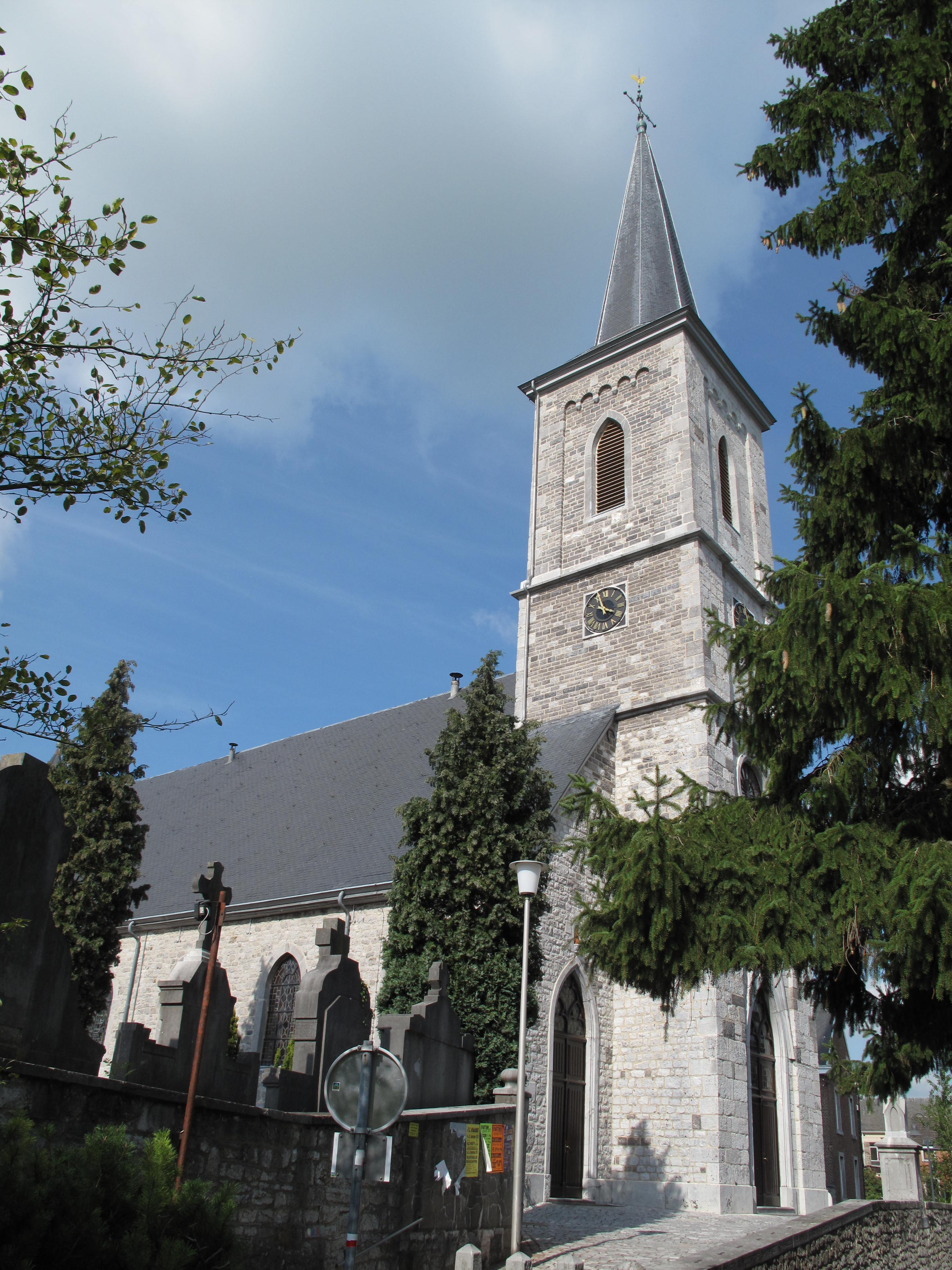
Raeren, church: Sankt Nikolauskirche

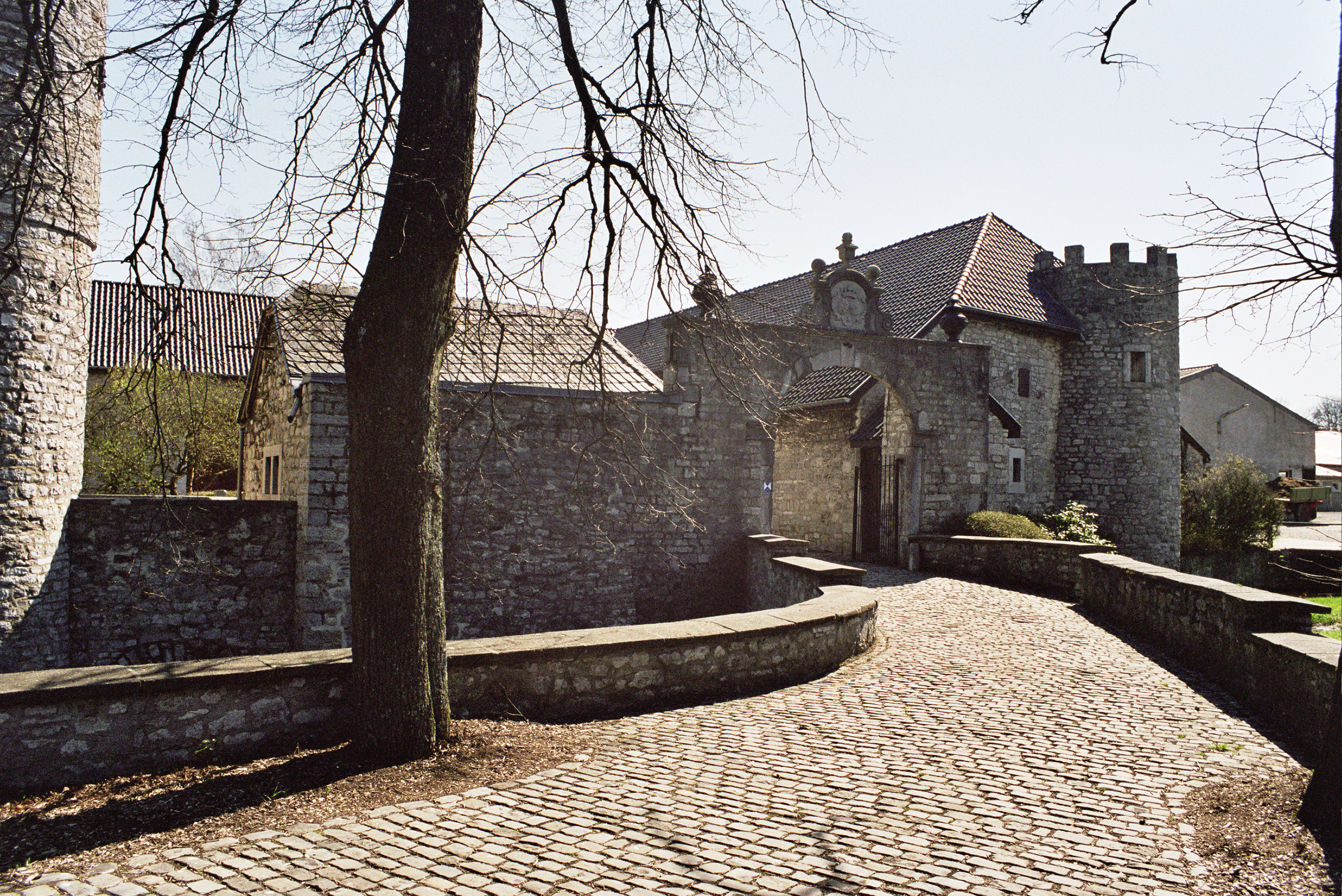
Raeren Castle

== See also ==
- List of protected heritage sites in Raeren
- German-speaking community of Belgium
- Vlattenhaus
