= Wégimont Castle =

Castle in Liège Province, Belgium

- Château de Wégimont (French)
- Soumagne, Liège Province, Wallonia, Belgium
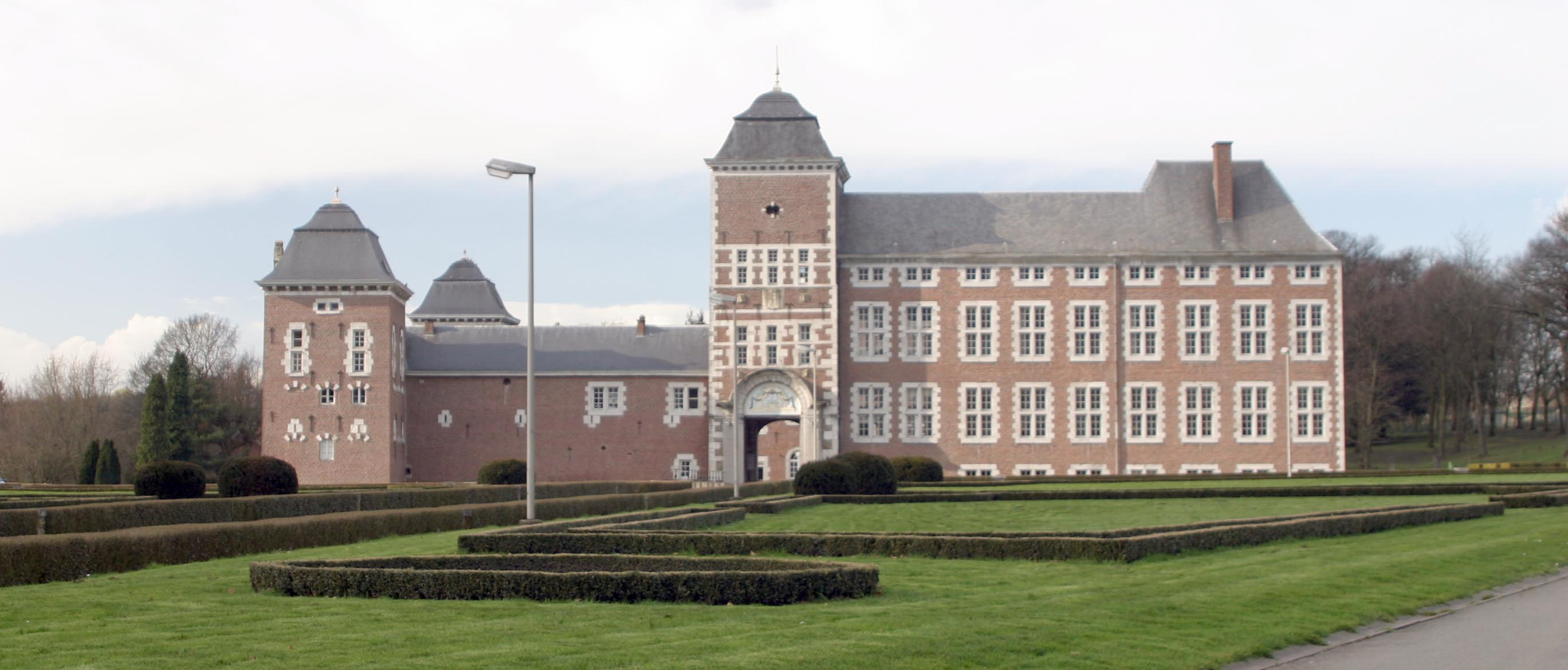

Site information
- Type: Castle

Location
- Coordinates: 50.612°N 5.738°E

Wégimont Castle (French: Château de Wégimont) is a castle in the ancienne commune of Ayeneux, Soumagne, Liège Province, Wallonia, Belgium.

During World War II, under the name Heim Ardennen, it was one of Nazi Germany's SS operated Lebensborn maternity homes.

== See also ==
- List of castles in Belgium

== Sources ==
- De Standaard, 29 Sept 2009: Hitlers kindercrèche in de Ardennen (in Dutch)
