= Hauset =

Coordinates: 50°42′35″N 6°4′12″E

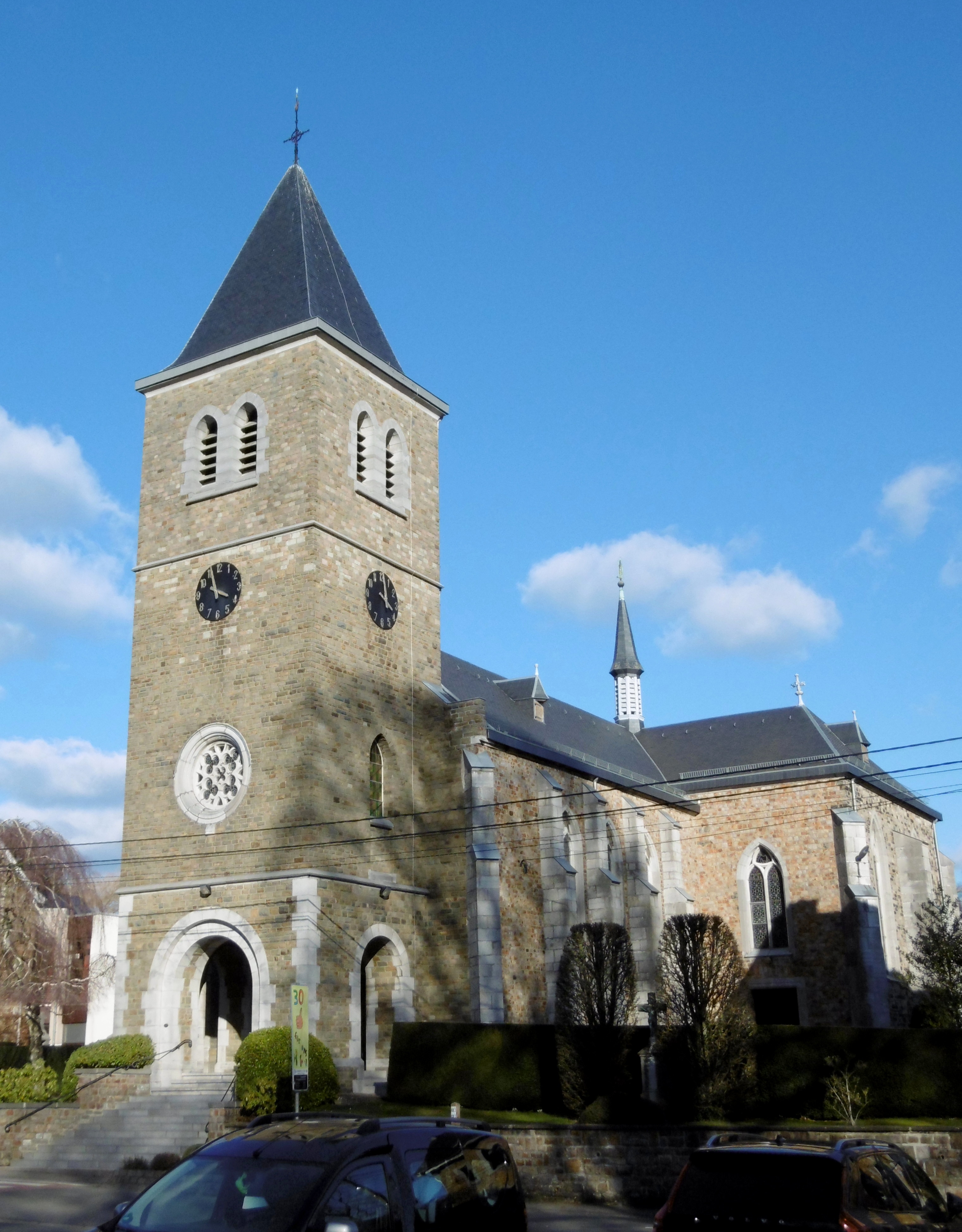
Sankt Rochus Church

Hauset is a village in the Belgian municipality of Raeren, part of the German-speaking Community of Belgium. The village is around 260m over Mean Sea Level, along the small river Geul and borders the Forest of Aachen. The population, around 1700 inhabitants, is German-speaking and is about half of German citizens who come from the Aachen region. Hauset is on the border to Germany, close to Aachen. Adjacent Belgian villages are Hergenrath, Walhorn and Eynatten.

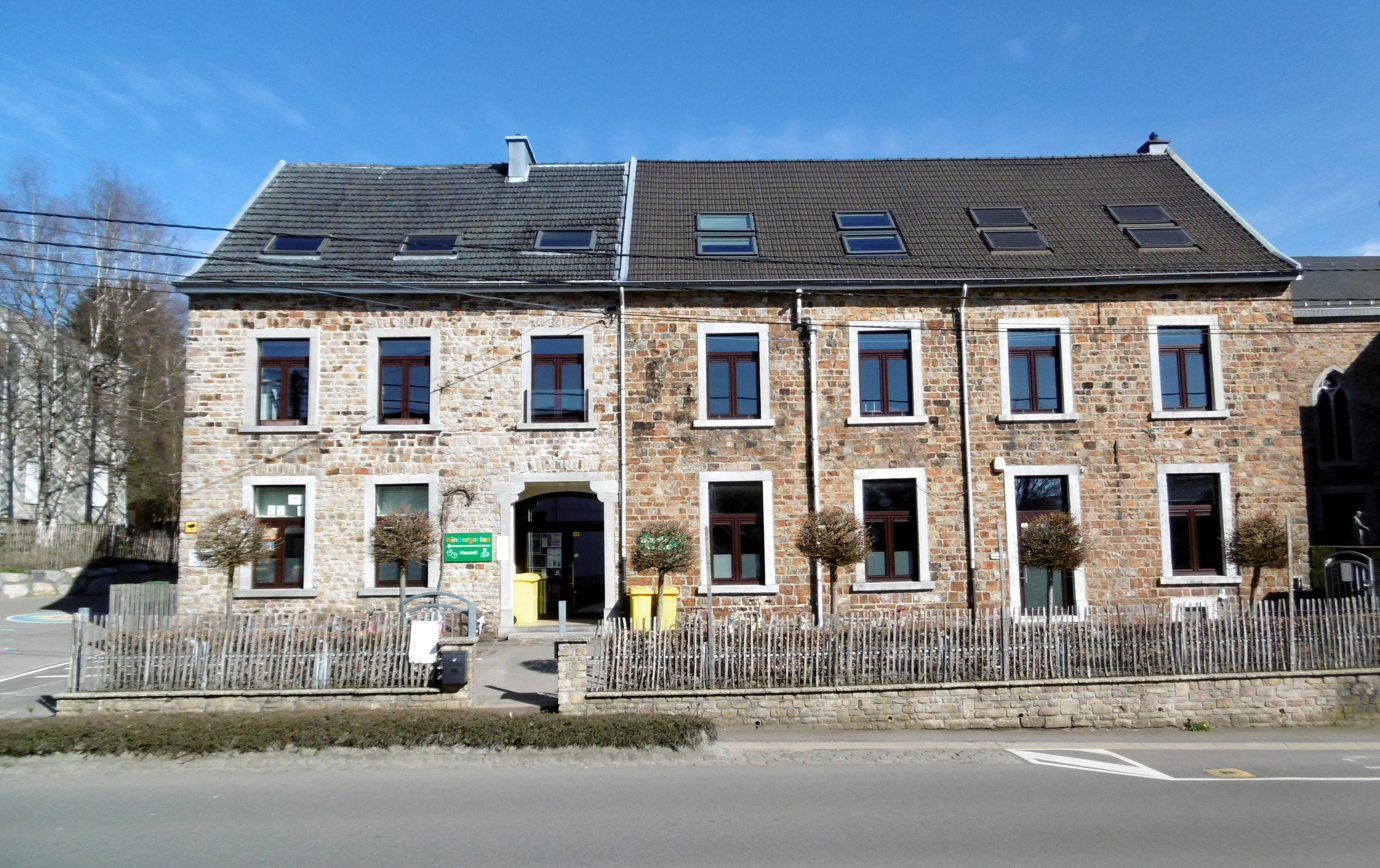
School since 1855
