= Soumagne =

Municipality in Liège Province, Wallonia, Belgium

Soumagne Soûmagne (Walloon)
- Municipality
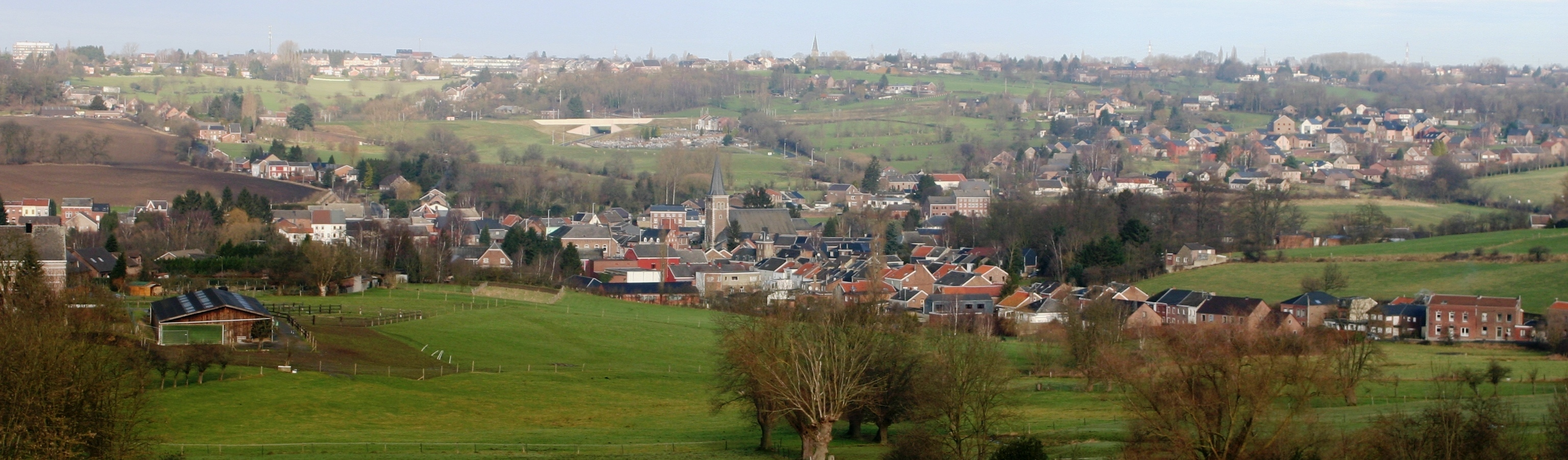

- Coat of arms

- Location of Soumagne in Liège province
- Interactive map of Soumagne
- Location in Belgium
- Coordinates: 50°37′N 05°45′E
- Country: Belgium
- Community: French Community
- Region: Wallonia
- Province: Liège
- Arrondissement: Liège

Government
  - Mayor: Benjamin Houet (MR) (SOUMAGNE DEMAIN)
  - Governing party: SOUMAGNE DEMAIN - ICI Soumagne - ECOLO +

Area
  - Total: 27.19 km^{2} (10.50 sq mi)

Population (2018-01-01)
  - Total: 16,888
  - Density: 621.1/km^{2} (1,609/sq mi)
- Postal codes: 4630-4633
- NIS code: 62099
- Area codes: 04
- Website: www.soumagne.be

Soumagne (French pronunciation: [sumaɲ], Walloon: Soûmagne) is a municipality of Wallonia located in the province of Liège, Belgium.

On September 1, 2008, Soumagne had a total population of 15,894. The total area is 27.14 km^{2} which gives a population density of 585 inhabitants per km^{2}.

The municipality consists of the following districts: Ayeneux, Cerexhe-Heuseux, Évegnée-Tignée, Mélen, Micheroux, and Soumagne.

== History ==
From the end of the 19th century until the 1960s, Soumagne was a flourishing municipality with numerous coal mines and a large Cooperative factory. After the end of coal mining, the mines were cleaned and residences as well as shopping areas were built. Some buildings are kept and transformed into tourism activities (such as "le domaine du Bas-Bois").

During the German invasion of Belgium at the beginning of World War I, the Imperial German Army killed 118 civilians and burned 100 houses in the village as collective punishment for the Belgian Army's resistance of the invasion from the nearby Fort de Fléron.

Since 1980, the higher number of people leaving big cities (Liège and Verviers) for more rural municipalities, with the E40 motorway passing on its territory, Soumagne recovered from the loss of coal mining and the end of the Cooperative. In that period, houses are built due to a new, and young, population settling down in Soumagne. A lot of new shops and commercial centers opened and small companies are emerging.

== Attractions ==
There are a few touristic points in Soumange (among others):

- the Evegnée fountain (natural fountain in a rural landscape)
- Saint-Lambert church (built during the 13th century, burnt in 1694 and rebuilt)
- "Domaine du Bas-Bois" (a former coal mine site)
- Wégimont Castle (14th century construction changed through the centuries with a park transformed into a family amusement area)

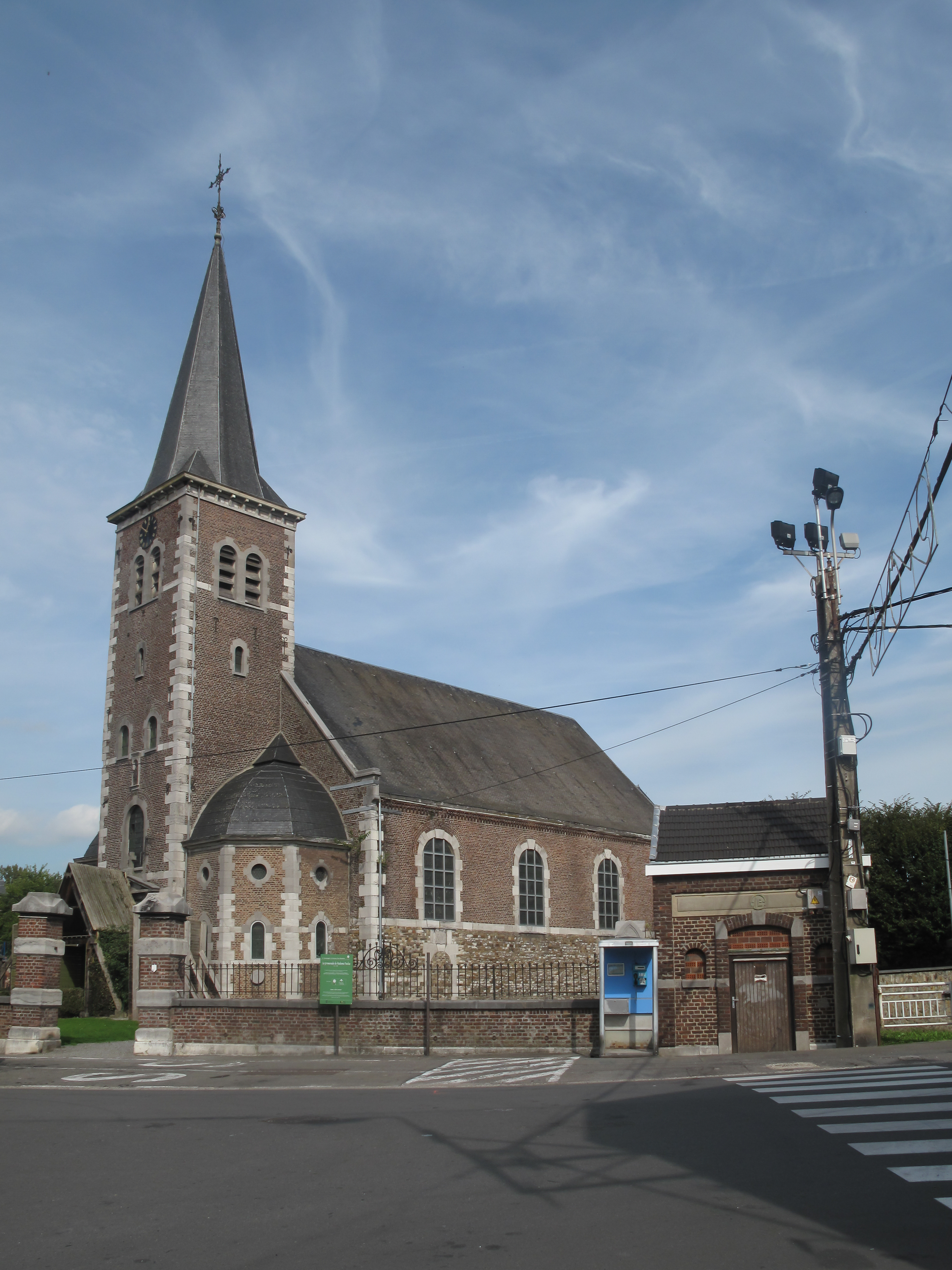
Soumagne, church: église Saint Lambert

== See also ==
- List of protected heritage sites in Soumagne
