= Minister of State (Belgium) =

The Minister of State (Dutch: Minister van Staat, French: Ministre d'État, German: Staatsminister) is an honorary title in Belgium. It is formally granted by the Belgian monarch, but on the initiative of the Belgian federal government. It is given on a personal basis, for life rather than for a specified period. The title is granted for exceptional merits, generally to senior politicians at the end of their party careers. It is not lost after a criminal conviction (Guy Spitaels, Willy Claes). Ministers of state are often former cabinet members or party leaders. Ministers of State advise the Sovereign in delicate situations, with moral authority but without formal competence. They are also members of the Crown Council of Belgium.

== List of living ministers of state ==
- Willy Claes – 2 December 1983
- Philippe Busquin – 26 May 1992
- Guy Verhofstadt – 30 January 1995
- Louis Tobback – 30 January 1995
- Annemie Neyts – 30 January 1995
- Magda Aelvoet – 30 January 1995
- Louis Michel – 30 January 1995
- José Daras – 30 January 1995
- Gérard Deprez – 30 January 1995
- Herman De Croo – 3 June 1998
- François-Xavier de Donnea – 17 July 1998
- Mark Eyskens – 18 November 1998
- Elio Di Rupo – 28 January 2002
- Raymond Langendries – 28 January 2002
- Patrick Dewael – 28 January 2002
- Jos Geysels – 28 January 2002
- Karel De Gucht – 28 January 2002
- Herman Van Rompuy – 26 January 2004
- Charles Picqué – 26 January 2004
- Philippe Monfils – 26 January 2004
- Johan Vande Lanotte – 30 January 2006
- Frank Vandenbroucke – 24 November 2009
- Melchior Wathelet – 7 December 2009
- André Flahaut – 7 December 2009
- Yves Leterme – 7 December 2011
- Jacques van Ypersele de Strihou – 20 July 2013
- Frans van Daele – 2 November 2017
- Charles Michel – 31 October 2019
- Sophie Wilmès – 18 May 2026
- Alexander De Croo – 18 May 2026

== Former ministers of state ==
Date of appointment	Name	Birth Death
12 November 1831	Félix de Mérode	1791–1857
12 November 1831	Barthélémy de Theux de Meylandt	1794–1874
12 November 1831	Felix de Muelenaere	1793–1862
17 September 1832	Albert Goblet d'Alviella	1790–1873
8 August 1834	Auguste Duvivier	1772–1846
19 August 1836	Louis Evain	1775–1852
19 June 1845	Jean-Baptiste Nothomb	1805–1881
30 July 1845	Edouard d'Huart	1800–1884
12 August 1845	Edouard Mercier	1799–1870
12 August 1847	Charles Liedts	1802–1878
12 August 1847	Henri de Brouckère	1801–1891
6 June 1856	Jules Joseph d'Anethan	1803–1888
6 June 1856	Adolphe Dechamps	1807–1875
6 June 1856	Charles Le Hon	1792–1868
12 November 1857	Joseph Lebeau	1794–1866
12 November 1857	Noël Delfosse	1801–1858
3 June 1861	Walthère Frère-Orban	1812–1896
4 November 1861	Adolphe de Vrière	1806–1885
13 May 1863	Eugène de Ligne	1804–1880
13 May 1863	Sylvain Van de Weyer	1802–1874
6 June 1863	Constant d'Hoffschmidt	1804–1873
4 January 1868	Charles Rogier	1800–1885
4 January 1868	Alphonse Vandenpeereboom	1812–1884
24 July 1870	Jules Malou	1810–1886
7 July 1872	Barthélemy Dumortier	1797–1878
1 May 1875	Charles Vilain XIIII	1803–1878
1 May 1875	Hubert Dolez	1808–1880
7 January 1879	François D'Elhoungne	1815–1892
7 January 1879	Auguste Orts	1814–1880
18 June 1884	Eudore Pirmez	1830–1890
25 January 1885	Auguste Lambermont	1819–1905
20 May 1888	Victor Jacobs	1838–1891
20 May 1888	Charles Delcour	1811–1889
9 June 1890	Théophile de Lantsheere	1833–1918
9 June 1890	Karel de Mérode-Westerloo	1824–1892
9 June 1890	Henri t'Kint de Roodenbeke	1817–1900
15 November 1891	Louis de Jonghe d'Ardoye	1820–1893
15 November 1891	Jules Guillery	1824–1902
15 November 1891	Charles Woeste	1837–1922
28 March 1894	August Beernaert	1829–1912
28 March 1894	Jules Le Jeune	1828–1911
9 November 1897	Pierre Tack	1818–1910
24 January 1899	Paul de Smet de Naeyer	1843–1913
7 May 1900	Joseph Devolder	1842–1919
7 May 1900	Charles Graux	1837–1910
7 May 1900	Jules Vandenpeereboom	1843–1917
1 May 1907	Paul de Favereau	1856–1922
1 May 1907	Jules Van den Heuvel	1854–1926
6 May 1907	Frans Schollaert	1851–1917
6 May 1907	Jules Greindl	1835–1917
6 May 1907	Émile Dupont	1834–1912
22 February 1912	Julien Liebaert	1848–1930
23 February 1912	Gérard Cooreman	1852–1926
23 February 1912	Joris Helleputte	1852–1925
23 February 1912	Xavier Neujean	1840–1914
23 February 1912	Louis Huysmans	1844–1915
14 August 1912	Louis De Sadeleer	1852–1924
14 August 1912	Paul Janson	1840–1913
2 August 1914	Paul Hymans	1865–1941
4 August 1914	Emile Vandervelde	1866–1938
26 July 1915	Eugène Beyens	1855–1934
31 May 1918	Charles de Broqueville	1860–1940
21 November 1918	Paul Segers	1870–1946
21 November 1918	Henri Carton de Wiart	1869–1951
21 November 1918	Aloys Van de Vyvere	1871–1961
21 November 1918	Ernest Solvay	1838–1922
21 November 1918	Michel Levie	1851–1939
21 November 1918	Adolphe Max	1869–1939
21 November 1918	Emile Francqui	1863–1935
21 November 1918	Paul Van Hoegaerden	1858–1922
21 November 1918	Paul Berryer	1868–1936
21 November 1918	Léon Colleaux	1865–1950
21 November 1918	Louis Bertrand	1856–1943
2 June 1920	Jules Renkin	1862–1934
20 November 1920	Léon Delacroix	1867–1929
11 March 1924	Henri Jaspar	1870–1939
2 April 1925	Emile Brunet	1863–1945
2 April 1925	Alexandre Braun	1847–1935
2 April 1925	Charles Magnette	1863–1937
13 May 1925	Georges Theunis	1873–1966
13 May 1925	Fulgence Masson	1854–1942
20 May 1926	Prosper Poullet	1868–1937
27 September 1926	Louis Franck	1868–1937
13 October 1926	Jean Servais	1856–1946
8 April 1930	Emile Tibbaut	1862–1935
8 April 1930	Edward Anseele	1856–1938
8 April 1930	Albert Devèze	1881–1959
6 June 1931	Paul-Emile Janson	1872–1944
6 June 1931	Frans Van Cauwelaert	1880–1961
22 February 1932	Maurice Houtart	1866–1939
23 September 1932	Jules Poncelet	1869–1952
23 September 1932	Xavier Neujean	1865–1940
31 July 1934	Maurice Lippens	1875–1956
31 July 1934	Cyrille Van Overbergh	1866–1959
3 September 1945	Louis de Brouckère	1870–1951
3 September 1945	Achille Delattre	1879–1964
3 September 1945	Octave Dierckx	1882–1955
3 September 1945	Frans Fischer	1875–1949
3 September 1945	Robert Gillon	1884–1972
3 September 1945	Camille Gutt	1884–1971
3 September 1945	Henri Heyman	1879–1958
3 September 1945	Georges Hubin	1863–1947
3 September 1945	Camille Huysmans	1871–1968
3 September 1945	Victor Maistriau	1870–1961
3 September 1945	Joseph Merlot	1886–1959
3 September 1945	Hubert Pierlot	1883–1963
3 September 1945	Eugène Soudan	1880–1960
3 September 1945	Paul Tschoffen	1878–1961
13 February 1946	Romain Moyersoen	1870–1967
21 July 1948	Henri Rolin	1891–1973
21 July 1948	Paul Van Zeeland	1893–1973
21 July 1948	August De Schryver	1898–1991
21 July 1948	Max Buset	1896–1959
24 June 1949	Albert-Edouard Janssen	1883–1969
11 August 1949	Paul-Henri Spaak	1899–1972
24 December 1950	Cassian Lohest	1894–1951
23 December 1958	Théo Lefèvre	1914–1973
23 December 1958	Roger Motz	1904–1964
23 December 1958	Paul Struye	1896–1974
23 December 1958	Achiel Van Acker	1898–1975
5 April 1963	Paul Kronacker	1897–1994
5 April 1963	Gaston Eyskens	1905–1988
5 April 1963	Leo Collard	1902–1981
5 April 1963	Charles du Bus de Warnaffe	1894–1965
5 April 1963	Joseph Lemaire	1882–1966
12 July 1966	Joseph Pholien	1884–1968
12 July 1966	Jean Van Houtte	1907–1991
12 July 1966	René Lefebvre	1893–1976
12 July 1966	Antoon Spinoy	1906–1967
12 July 1966	Paul-Willem Segers	1900–1983
12 July 1966	Piet Vermeylen	1904–1991
12 July 1966	Oscar Behogne	1900–1970
12 July 1966	Omer Vanaudenhove	1913–1994
12 July 1966	Maurice Destenay	1900–1973
12 July 1966	Émile Cornez	1900–1967
15 July 1969	Paul Vanden Boeynants	1919–2001
15 July 1969	Albert Lilar	1900–1976
15 July 1969	Robert Houben	1905–1992
15 July 1969	Léon-Eli Troclet	1902–1980
15 July 1969	Jos Van Eynde	1907–1992
22 February 1971	Edmond Leburton	1915–1997
23 February 1972	Jean Rey	1902–1983
20 February 1973	Pierre Harmel	1911–2009
30 March 1973	Louis Major	1902–1985
30 March 1973	Edmond Machtens	1902–1978
30 March 1973	Pierre Descamps	1916–1992
30 March 1973	August Cool	1903–1983
18 October 1974	Marguerite De Riemaecker-Legot	1923–1977
18 October 1974	Marc-Antoine Pierson	1908–1988
18 October 1974	Frans Grootjans	1922–1999
14 February 1977	Raymond Scheyven	1911–1987
14 February 1977	Raoul Vreven	1900–1979
14 February 1977	Alfons Vranckx	1907–1979
14 February 1977	Robert Henrion	1915–1997
4 October 1978	Jos De Saeger	1911–1998
2 December 1983	Ward Leemans	1926–1998
2 December 1983	André Cools	1927–1991
2 December 1983	Herman Vanderpoorten	1922–1984
2 December 1983	Jean Defraigne	1929–2016
2 December 1983	Michel Toussaint	1922–2007
2 December 1983	Alfred Califice	1916–1999
2 December 1983	Frans Van der Elst	1920–1997
2 December 1983	August Vanistendael	1917–2003
2 December 1983	Antoinette Spaak	1928–2020
2 December 1983	Guy Spitaels	1931–2012
6 January 1985	Willy Declercq	1927–2011
6 June 1985	Frank Van Acker	1929–1992
7 March 1992	Wilfried Martens	1936–2013
26 May 1992	Paula D'Hondt	1926–2022
26 May 1992	Jean Gol	1942–1995
26 May 1992	Arthur Gilson	1915–2004
26 May 1992	Irène Pétry	1922–2007
26 May 1992	Gilbert Temmerman	1928–2012
26 May 1992	Leo Tindemans	1922–2014
26 May 1992	Renaat Van Elslande	1916–2000
26 May 1992	Karel Van Miert	1942–2009
10 September 1993	Andries Kinsbergen	1926–2016
30 January 1995	Philippe Moureaux	1939–2018
30 January 1995	Charles-Ferdinand Nothomb	1936–2023
30 January 1995	Frank Swaelen	1930–2007
30 January 1995	Hugo Schiltz	1927–2006
17 July 1998	Gaston Geens	1931–2002
17 July 1998	Antoine Duquesne	1941–2010
17 July 1998	Philippe Maystadt	1948–2017
17 July 1998	Robert Urbain	1930–2018
12 July 1999	Jean-Luc Dehaene	1940–2014
28 January 2002	Daniel Ducarme	1954–2010
28 January 2002	Roger Lallemand	1932–2016
28 January 2002	Jacky Morael	1959–2016
28 January 2002	Miet Smet	1943–2024
28 January 2002	Freddy Willockx	1947–2024
1 August 2003	Luc Coene	1947–2017
26 January 2004	Jaak Gabriëls	1943–2024
26 January 2004	Steve Stevaert	1954–2015
26 January 2004	Etienne Davignon	1932–2026
24 November 2009	Jos Chabert	1933–2014
24 November 2009	Armand De Decker	1948–2019
7 December 2009	Karel Poma	1920–2014
