= Martens I Government =

The Martens I Government was the national government of Belgium from 3 April 1979 to 23 January 1980.

It was the first government headed by Wilfried Martens and comprised the Flemish Christian People's Party (CVP), the French-speaking Christian Social Party (PSC), the Flemish Belgian Socialist Party (BSP), the French-speaking Socialist Party (SP) and the Democratic Front of Francophones (FDF). It fell after nine months, when the FDF left the government.

== Composition ==
Minister	Name	Party
Prime Minister	Wilfried Martens	CVP
Deputy Prime Minister - Budget	Guy Spitaels	PS
Deputy Prime Minister - Economic Affairs	Willy Claes	BSP
Deputy Prime Minister - Defence	Paul Vanden Boeynants (to Oct. 1979); José Desmarets (from Oct. 1979)	PSC
Communication	Jos Chabert	CVP
Justice	Renaat Van Elslande	CVP
Foreign Affairs	Henri Simonet	PS
Social Assistance and Pensions	Alfred Califice	PSC
Agriculture and Middle Classes	Albert Lavens	CVP
Education	Jef Ramaekers	BSP
Dutch-speaking Community Affairs	Rika De Backer	CVP
Public Health and Environment	Luc Dhoore	CVP
Finance	Gaston Geens	CVP
Walloon Affairs	Jean-Maurice Dehousse	PS
Public Works	Guy Mathot	PS
PTT	Robert Urbain	PS
Development Cooperation	Mark Eyskens	CVP
Employment and Labour	Roger De Wulf	BSP
Education	Jacques Hoyaux	PS
Interior and Institutional Reform	Georges Gramme	PSC
Flemish Affairs	Marc Galle	BSP
French-speaking Community Affairs	Michel Hansenne	PSC
Civil Service and Institutional Reform	Willy Calewaert	BSP
Brussels Affairs	Léon Defosset	FDF
Foreign Trade and Science Policy	Lucien Outers	FDF
Secretary of State	Name	Party
Brussels Affairs	Guy Cudell	PS
Flemish Affairs	Paul Akkermans	CVP
Dutch-speaking Community Affairs	Rika Steyaert	CVP
Brussels Affairs	Lydia De Pauw	BSP
Flemish Affairs	Daniel Coens	CVP
Walloon Affairs	Bernard Anselme	PS
Walloon Affairs	Antoine Humblet	PSC
French-speaking Community Affairs	François Persoons	FDF

== Reshuffles ==
- 15 October 1979: José Desmarets (PSC) replaces Paul Vanden Boeynants as Deputy Prime Minister and Minister of Defence. Philippe Maystadt (PSC) replaces Antoine Humblet as Secretary of State for the Walloon Region.
- 16 January 1980: Lucien Outers, Léon Defosset and François Persoons resign.
