= Charleroi (Chamber of Representatives constituency) =

Parliamentary constituency in Belgium

Charleroi was a constituency used to elect a single member of the Belgian Chamber of Representatives between 1831 and 1991.

== Representatives ==
| Election | Representative (Party) | Representative (Party) | Representative (Party) | Representative (Party) | Representative (Party) | Representative (Party) | Representative (Party) | Representative (Party) | Representative (Party) | Representative (Party) | Representative (Party) |
|---|---|---|---|---|---|---|---|---|---|---|---|
| 1831 | Guillaume Dumont (Liberal) | Jean Pirmez (Liberal) | 2 seats | | | | | | | | |
| 1833 | Auguste Frison (Liberal) | Jean Pirmez (Liberal) | 2 seats | | | | | | | | |
| 1837 | Guillaume Dumont (Liberal) | Jean Pirmez (Liberal) | 2 seats | | | | | | | | |
| 1841 | Guillaume Dumont (Liberal) | Jean Pirmez (Liberal) | 2 seats | | | | | | | | |
| 1845 | Guillaume Dumont (Liberal) | Jean Pirmez (Liberal) | Adolphe Dechamps (Catholic) | 3 seats | | | | | | | |
| 1848 | Guillaume Dumont (Liberal) | Jean Pirmez (Liberal) | Adolphe Dechamps (Catholic) | 3 seats | | | | | | | |
| 1852 | Aristide Brixhe (Liberal) | Jean Pirmez (Liberal) | Adolphe Dechamps (Catholic) | 3 seats | | | | | | | |
| 1856 | Aristide Brixhe (Liberal) | Jean Wautelet (Catholic) | Adolphe Dechamps (Catholic) | 3 seats | | | | | | | |
| 1857 | Charles-Louis Lebeau (Liberal) | Eudore Pirmez (Liberal) | Adolphe Dechamps (Catholic) | Gustave Sabatier (Liberal) | 4 seats | | | | | | |
| 1861 | Charles-Louis Lebeau (Liberal) | Eudore Pirmez (Liberal) | Adolphe Dechamps (Catholic) | Gustave Sabatier (Liberal) | 4 seats | | | | | | |
| 1864 | Charles-Louis Lebeau (Liberal) | Eudore Pirmez (Liberal) | Barthel Dewandre (Liberal) | Dominique Jonet (Liberal) | 4 seats | | | | | | |
| 1868 | Charles-Louis Lebeau (Liberal) | Eudore Pirmez (Liberal) | Barthel Dewandre (Liberal) | Dominique Jonet (Liberal) | 4 seats | | | | | | |
| 1870 | Adolphe Drion du Chapois (Catholic) | Eudore Pirmez (Liberal) | Albert Hermant (Catholic) | Charles Emile Balisaux (Catholic) | Eugène Charles de Dorlodot (Catholic) | 5 seats | | | | | |
| 1874 | Adolphe Drion du Chapois (Catholic) | Eudore Pirmez (Liberal) | Casimir Lambert (Liberal) | Gustave Sabatier (Liberal) | Emile Vandam (Liberal) | 5 seats | | | | | |
| 1878 | Philippe Mondez (Liberal) | Eudore Pirmez (Liberal) | Casimir Lambert (Liberal) | Gustave Sabatier (Liberal) | Emile Vandam (Liberal) | Victor Gillieaux (Liberal) | Victor Lucq (Liberal) | 7 seats | | | |
| 1882 | Philippe Mondez (Liberal) | Eudore Pirmez (Liberal) | Casimir Lambert (Liberal) | Gustave Sabatier (Liberal) | Emile Vandam (Liberal) | Victor Gillieaux (Liberal) | Victor Lucq (Liberal) | 7 seats | | | |
| 1886 | Ferdinand Noël (Catholic) | Jules Martin Philippot (Liberal) | Casimir Lambert (Liberal) | Gustave Sabatier (Liberal) | Lucien Giroul (Liberal) | Victor Gillieaux (Liberal) | Adolphe Drion du Chapois (Catholic) | 7 seats | | | |
| 1890 | Edouard Chaudron (Liberal) | Jules Martin Philippot (Liberal) | Léopold Fagnart (Liberal) | Gustave Sabatier (Liberal) | Lucien Giroul (Liberal) | Victor Gillieaux (Liberal) | Oscar Deprez (Liberal) | 7 seats | | | |
| 1892 | Edouard Chaudron (Liberal) | Jules Martin Philippot (Liberal) | Léopold Fagnart (Liberal) | Gustave Sabatier (Liberal) | Jules Coppée (Liberal) | Victor Gillieaux (Liberal) | Oscar Deprez (Liberal) | 7 seats | | | |
| 1894 | Emile Vandervelde (PS) | Ferdinand Cavrot (PS) | Henri Léonard (PS) | Gustave Sabatier (Liberal) | Jean Caeluwaert (PS) | Jules Destrée (PS) | Léon Furnémont (PS) | Pierre Lambillotte (PS) | 8 seats | | |
| 1898 | Emile Vandervelde (PS) | Ferdinand Cavrot (PS) | Henri Léonard (PS) | Paul Pastur (PS) | Jean Caeluwaert (PS) | Jules Destrée (PS) | Léon Furnémont (PS) | Pierre Lambillotte (PS) | 8 seats | | |
| 1900 | Emile Bertaux (Liberal) | Ferdinand Cavrot (PS) | Henri Léonard (PS) | Michel Levie (Catholic) | Jean Caeluwaert (PS) | Jules Destrée (PS) | Léon Furnémont (PS) | Pierre Lambillotte (PS) | 8 seats | | |
| 1904 | Edmond Dewandre (Liberal) | Ferdinand Cavrot (PS) | Henri Léonard (PS) | Michel Levie (Catholic) | Jean Caeluwaert (PS) | Jules Destrée (PS) | Emile Buisset (Liberal) | Pierre Lambillotte (PS) | Maurice Pirmez (Catholic) | 9 seats | |
| 1908 | Ernest Drion du Chapois (Catholic) | Ferdinand Cavrot (PS) | Henri Léonard (PS) | Michel Levie (Catholic) | Jean Caeluwaert (PS) | Jules Destrée (PS) | Emile Buisset (Liberal) | Pierre Lambillotte (PS) | Maurice Pirmez (Catholic) | 9 seats | |
| 1912 | Michel Levie (Catholic) | Emile Brunet (PS) | Henri Léonard (PS) | Maurice Pirmez (Catholic) | Alphonse Briart (Liberal) | Jules Destrée (PS) | Emile Buisset (Liberal) | Pierre Lambillotte (PS) | Maurice Pirmez (Catholic) | Nicolas Souplit (PS) | Victor Ernest (PS) |
| 1919 | Michel Levie (Catholic) | Emile Brunet (PS) | Henri Léonard (PS) | Maurice Pirmez (Catholic) | Alphonse Briart (Liberal) | Jules Destrée (PS) | Emile Buisset (Liberal) | Alfred Lombard (PS) | Edouard Falony (PS) | Nicolas Souplit (PS) | Victor Ernest (PS) |
| 1921 | Ernest Drion du Chapois (Catholic) | Emile Brunet (PS) | Henri Léonard (PS) | Maurice Pirmez (Catholic) | Alphonse Briart (Liberal) | Jules Destrée (PS) | Arthur Pater (Liberal) | Alfred Lombard (PS) | Edouard Falony (PS) | Nicolas Souplit (PS) | Victor Ernest (PS) |
| 1925 | Ernest Drion du Chapois (Catholic) | Emile Brunet (PS) | Eugène Van Walleghem (PS) | Armand Duvieusart (Catholic) | Alphonse Briart (Liberal) | Jules Destrée (PS) | Arthur Pater (Liberal) | Alfred Lombard (PS) | Edouard Falony (PS) | Nicolas Souplit (PS) | Victor Ernest (PS) |
| 1929 | Ernest Drion du Chapois (Catholic) | Emile Brunet (PS) | Eugène Van Walleghem (PS) | Jean-Elie Bodart (Catholic) | Alphonse Briart (Liberal) | Jules Destrée (PS) | Edmond Leclercq (Liberal) | Alfred Lombard (PS) | Edouard Falony (PS) | Nicolas Souplit (PS) | Victor Ernest (PS) |
| 1932 | Ernest Drion du Chapois (Catholic) | Emile Brunet (PS) | Eugène Van Walleghem (PS) | Georges Michaux (Catholic) | Alphonse Briart (Liberal) | Henri Glineur (PCB) | Edmond Leclercq (Liberal) | Alfred Lombard (PS) | Georges Bohy (PS) | Corneille Embise (PS) | Victor Ernest (PS) |
| 1936 | Ernest Drion du Chapois (Catholic) | Emile Brunet (PS) | Eugène Van Walleghem (PS) | Jean-Elie Bodart (Catholic) | Désiré Desellier (PCB) | Henri Glineur (PCB) | Edmond Leclercq (Liberal) | Prosper Teughels (REX) | Georges Bohy (PS) | Arthur Gailly (PS) | Victor Ernest (PS) |
| 1939 | Jean Duvieusart (Catholic) | Marius Bufquin des Essarts (PS) | Eugène Van Walleghem (PS) | Oscar Behogne (Catholic) | Jean-Baptiste Cornez (PCB) | Henri Glineur (PCB) | Edmond Leclercq (Liberal) | Fernand Masquelier (Liberal) | Georges Bohy (PS) | Arthur Gailly (PS) | Corneille Embise (PS) |
| 1946 | Jean Duvieusart (Catholic) | Arthur Gailly (BSP) | Corneille Embise (BSP) | Oscar Behogne (Catholic) | Eugène Van Walleghem (BSP) | Fernand Demany (PCB) | Georges Bohy (BSP) | Fernand Masquelier (Liberal) | Georges Glineur (PCB) | Joseph Dedoyard (BSP) | Raoul Baligand (PCB) |
| 1949 | Maurice Brasseur (CVP) | Arthur Gailly (BSP) | Raoul Hicguet (BSP) | Oscar Behogne (Catholic) | René De Cooman (BSP) | Fernand Demany (PCB) | Georges Bohy (BSP) | Fernand Masquelier (Liberal) | Georges Glineur (PCB) | Joseph Dedoyard (BSP) | René Dupriez (Liberal) |
| 1950 | Maurice Brasseur (CVP) | Arthur Gailly (BSP) | Raoul Hicguet (BSP) | Oscar Behogne (Catholic) | René De Cooman (BSP) | Fernand Devilers (CVP) | Georges Bohy (BSP) | Fernand Masquelier (Liberal) | Georges Glineur (PCB) | Joseph Dedoyard (BSP) | Corneille Embise (BSP) |
| 1954 | Maurice Brasseur (CVP) | Arthur Gailly (BSP) | Raoul Hicguet (BSP) | Oscar Behogne (Catholic) | René De Cooman (BSP) | Clotaire Cornet (Liberal) | Georges Bohy (BSP) | Fernand Masquelier (Liberal) | Georges Glineur (PCB) | Joseph Dedoyard (BSP) | Yvonne Lambert (BSP) |
| 1958 | Maurice Brasseur (CVP) | Arthur Gailly (BSP) | Raoul Hicguet (BSP) | Oscar Behogne (Catholic) | René De Cooman (BSP) | Clotaire Cornet (Liberal) | Georges Bohy (BSP) | Lucien Harmegnies (BSP) | Georges Glineur (PCB) | Joseph Dedoyard (BSP) | Yvonne Lambert (BSP) |
| 1961 | Maurice Brasseur (CVP) | Ernest Glinne (BSP) | Raoul Hicguet (BSP) | Oscar Behogne (Catholic) | René De Cooman (BSP) | Clotaire Cornet (Liberal) | Georges Bohy (BSP) | Lucien Harmegnies (BSP) | Georges Glineur (PCB) | Yvan Henry (BSP) | Yvonne Lambert (BSP) |
| 1965 | Claude Hubaux (PVV) | Ernest Glinne (BSP) | Raoul Hicguet (BSP) | Fernand Devilers (CVP) | René De Cooman (BSP) | Clotaire Cornet (Liberal) | Georges Bohy (BSP) | Lucien Harmegnies (BSP) | Georges Glineur (PCB) | Alfred Califice (cdH) | Robert Moreau (RW) |
| 1968 | Claude Hubaux (PVV) | Ernest Glinne (BSP) | Raoul Hicguet (BSP) | André Baudson (BSP) | Léopold Tibbaut (BSP) | Clotaire Cornet (Liberal) | Georges Bohy (BSP) | Lucien Harmegnies (BSP) | Georges Glineur (PCB) | Alfred Califice (cdH) | Robert Moreau (RW) |
| 1971 | Claude Hubaux (PVV) | Ernest Glinne (BSP) | Fernand Helguers (RW) | André Baudson (BSP) | Léopold Tibbaut (BSP) | Marcel Meuter (RW) | Georges Bohy (BSP) | Lucien Harmegnies (BSP) | Raymond Brimant (cdH) | Alfred Califice (cdH) | Robert Moreau (RW) |
| 1974 | Claude Hubaux (PVV) | Ernest Glinne (BSP) | Fernand Helguers (RW) | André Baudson (BSP) | Léopold Tibbaut (BSP) | Etienne Duvieusart (RW) | Georges Bohy (BSP) | Lucien Harmegnies (BSP) | Raymond Brimant (cdH) | Alfred Califice (cdH) | Robert Moreau (RW) |
| 1977 | Etienne Knoops (PRL) | Ernest Glinne (BSP) | Fernand Helguers (RW) | André Baudson (BSP) | Léopold Tibbaut (BSP) | Philippe Maystadt (cdH) | Marc Harmegnies (PS) | Jean-Claude Van Cauwenberghe (PS) | 10 seats | Alfred Califice (cdH) | Robert Moreau (RW) |
| 1978 | Etienne Knoops (PRL) | Gérard le Hardÿ de Beaulieu (cdH) | Jacques Van Gompel (PS) | André Baudson (BSP) | Marc Harmegnies (PS) | Philippe Maystadt (cdH) | Philippe Busquin (PS) | Jean-Claude Van Cauwenberghe (PS) | 10 seats | Alfred Califice (cdH) | Robert Moreau (RW) |
| 1981 | Etienne Knoops (PRL) | Gérard le Hardÿ de Beaulieu (cdH) | Charles Petitjean (PRL) | André Baudson (BSP) | Marc Harmegnies (PS) | Philippe Maystadt (cdH) | Philippe Busquin (PS) | Jacques Collart (PS) | 10 seats | Jean-Pol Henry (PS) | Roland Lemoine (PS) |
| 1985 | Etienne Knoops (PRL) | Gérard le Hardÿ de Beaulieu (cdH) | Charles Petitjean (PRL) | André Baudson (BSP) | Marc Harmegnies (PS) | Philippe Maystadt (cdH) | Philippe Busquin (PS) | Jacques Collart (PS) | 10 seats | Jean-Pol Henry (PS) | Yves Delforge (Ecolo) |
| 1988 | Etienne Knoops (PRL) | Anne-Marie Corbisier-Hagon (cdH) | Philippe Charlier (cdH) | André Baudson (BSP) | Marc Harmegnies (PS) | Philippe Maystadt (cdH) | Philippe Busquin (PS) | Jacques Collart (PS) | 10 seats | Jean-Pol Henry (PS) | Philippe Laurent (cdH) |
| 1991 | Etienne Knoops (PRL) | Anne-Marie Corbisier-Hagon (cdH) | Philippe Charlier (cdH) | Daniel Ducarme (PRL) | Marc Harmegnies (PS) | Francis Poty (PS) | Philippe Busquin (PS) | Jacques Collart (PS) | 10 seats | Jean-Pol Henry (PS) | Philippe Dallons (Ecolo) |
| 1995 | Merged into Charleroi-Thuin | | | | Marc Harmegnies (PS) | | | | | | |
