= Liebaert =

Liebaert is a surname of Dutch (Flemish) origin, occurring particularly in Belgium, where a family of this name was ennobled in 1930. People of this name include:

- Baron Julien Liebaert (1848–1930), Belgian Minister of State
- Henri Liebaert (1895–1977), Belgian minister
- Iñaki Urdangarin (full name: Iñaki Urdangarin y Liebaert) (born 1968), brother-in-law of the King of Spain
- August Liebaert, Lord Mayor of Oostende
