= Graux =

Graux may refer to:

== People ==
- Charles Graux (politician), a Belgian professor, linguist, lawyer, and politician
- Charles Graux (classicist), a French classicist

== Other ==
- Graux, Wallonia, a district of the municipality of Mettet in Belgium
- Graux, West Virginia, an unincorporated community in Roane County
