= Willy De Clercq =

Belgian politician

The Viscount De Clercq
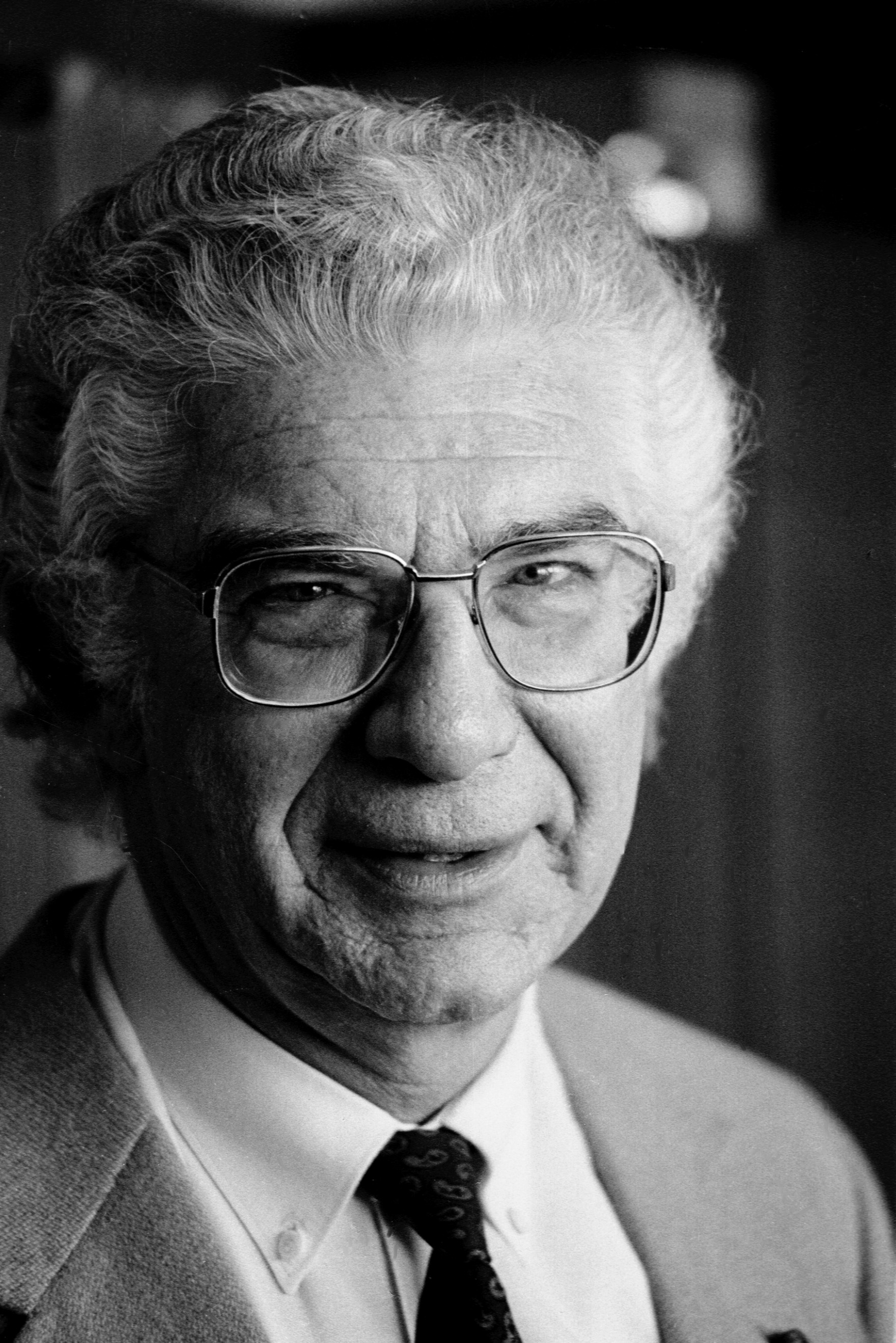
- De Clercq in 1986

European Commissioner for External Relations and Trade
- In office 7 January 1985 – 6 January 1989
- President: Jacques Delors
- Preceded by: Wilhelm Haferkamp (External Relations, Nuclear Affairs and Trade)
- Succeeded by: Frans Andriessen

Personal details
- Born: 8 July 1927 Ghent, Belgium
- Died: 28 October 2011 (aged 84) Ghent, Belgium
- Party: Party for Freedom and Progress
- Education: Ghent University; Syracuse University

Willy Clarisse Elvire Hector, Viscount De Clercq (8 July 1927 – 28 October 2011) was a Belgian liberal politician.

De Clercq was born in Ghent, son of Frans de Clercq. After his law and notariat studies at the University of Ghent and a scholarship at Syracuse University (Syracuse, United States), De Clerq became a lawyer at the Court of appeal in Ghent and a professor at Ghent University and the Vrije Universiteit Brussel. Although he could have had a successful career in law, he got into politics. He was member of the Liberal youth and was elected municipal councillor and member of parliament.

De Clercq served in various coalition governments. He was secretary of state for the budget (1960–1961), deputy prime minister and minister of the budget from 1966 to 1968, deputy prime minister and Minister of Finance in 1973–1974, Minister of Finance in 1974–1977, and deputy prime minister in 1980.

De Clercq served as president of various international monetary instances and as president of the then liberal party PVV. He served for a term as a member of the European Commission (1985–1989). Moreover, he became Minister of State in 1985. From 1989 to 2004, he was a member of the European Parliament.

In 2003, he created together with other prominent European personalities the Medbridge Strategy Center, whose goal is to promote dialogue and mutual understanding between Europe and the Middle-East.

He died on 28 October 2011.

== Honours ==
- Created viscount de Clercq by Royal Decree in 2006.
- Minister of State by Royal Decree.
- Grand Cordon in the Order of Leopold.
- Knight Grand Cross in the Order of the Crown.
- Knight Grand Cross in the Order of the Oak Crown.
- Knight Grand Cross in the Order of Merit of the Federal Republic of Germany.
- Knight Grand Cross in the Order of Merit of the Italian Republic.
- Knight Grand Cross in the Order of the White Rose of Finland.
- Grand officer in the Legion of Honour.

== Varia ==
He was the father of jonkheer Yannick De Clercq and grandfather of jonkheer Mathias De Clercq.

== Sources ==
- W. Prevenier, C. Ysebaert, L. Pareyn (Ed.), Vijftig jaar liberale praxis. Willy De Clercq vijfenzeventig jaar, 2002.
- T. Goorden, Willy De Clercq, een biografie, Lannoo, 2004, ISBN 90-209-5750-3

Political offices
Preceded by André Vlerick	Minister of Finance; 1973–1977	Succeeded by Gaston Geens
Preceded by Robert Vandeputte	Minister of Finance; 1981–1985	Succeeded by Frans Grootjans
Preceded by Étienne Davignon	Belgian European Commissioner; 1985–1989	Succeeded by Karel Van Miert
Preceded by Wilhelm Haferkamp as European Commissioner for External Relations, Nuclear Affairs and Trade	European Commissioner for External Relations and Trade; 1985–1989	Succeeded by Frans Andriessen
