= Jacques Coghen =

Belgian politician

Count Jacques Coghen
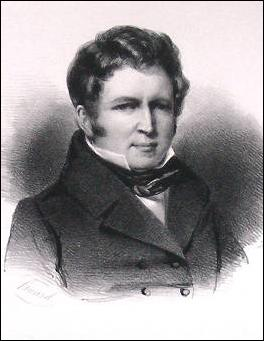
- Portrait by Louis Huard

Personal details
- Born: Jacques-André Coghen
- Party: Liberal
- Other political affiliations: Unionist, Catholic
- Relations: Great-great-great grandfather of King Philippe of Belgium
- Occupation: Banker, merchant
- Cabinet: Finance Minister

Count Jacques Andres Coghen (31 October 1791 – 15 May 1858) was the second Minister of Finance of the Kingdom of Belgium (1831-1832), and a direct ancestor of the current King, Philippe of Belgium.

A founding father of Belgium, Coghen was a merchant, financier, and politician of the Liberal Party. He was elevated to the rank of count in 1837.

== Ancestry ==
Before the family Coghen moved to Brussels, they were living from the early 14th century in the city of Diest as merchants and financial stewards. Some of them held official positions in that city such as mayor. During the Protestant Rebellion of the mid-16th century they supported the cause of William of Orange, the leader of that rebellion in the Low Countries, because the city of Diest was one of the four cities of the family of William of Orange (the other three being Breda, Duisburg and Orange).

Coghen was the son of Joseph Coghen (1749-1820), an apothecary, and his wife, Isabelle Stielemans, who was a native of Brussels.

His paternal grandfather, Jan Baptist Coghen (1717-1773) was born, was married, and died in Brussels.

His paternal grandmother, Catharina Theresia Huwaerts (1710-1749), was also born and died in Brussels, and her parents, Marie Therese van Cutsem (1668-1726/1727) and Joose Huwaerts (d. 1742), as well as their parents, were also from old Dutch families in the Brussels area (including such families as Ghysels, Walravens, de Broijer, Haeck, de Proost, and de Leenheer).

His mother was descended from several ancient Belgian families, from Brussels and Diest, whose ancestors in the sixteenth century appear to have been butchers and merchants, and who in the early seventeenth century included magistrates of the old county of Campine (Kempen in Dutch).

== Early life and business ==
Coghen was born on 31 October 1791.

He was married, on 17 May 1821, to Caroline Rittweger. The Rittweger family was from Altenkunstadt in Bavaria but moved to Brussels at the end of the 18th century when they were officials in the Postal Office of the Austrian Empire. François Rittweger, the father of Caroline, was a Brussels politician, director of several financial companies and financial advisor to the Belgian King Leopold I. He was freemason in the lodge "Les Amis Philanthropes". Jacques Coghen was also a freemason in the lodge "L'Espérance" in Brussels where he met other freemasons who would become leaders of the Belgian Revolution, namely Jean Barbanson (1797-1883), Eugène Defacqz (1797-1871), en Alexandre Gendebien (1789-1869).

The Coghen's had five children - Isabelle (1822-1891), Barbara (1823-1883), Henriette (1825-1880), Joseph-Frantz (1827-1888) and Marie (1832-1870).

Before the Belgian Revolution broke out, Coghen was a respected merchant and banker in Brussels; he was Chairman of the Commercial Court and a member of the Advisory Chamber of Commerce. In 1824, he co-founded, with Francois Rittweger, AG Life, the life insurance company, and in 1830, AG Fire, both of which later became part of the €45 billion Fortis, "the oldest and most important insurance company in Belgium", until it failed during the 2008 financial crisis.

He helped to start a glass factory cooperative company, Verreries de Mariemont, in 1829. Also in 1829, he bought Wolvendael, a 1763 castle near Uccle, from duke Charles-Louis-Auguste de Looz-Corswarem.

== Public life ==
Dutch Troops had scarcely retreated from the capital of Belgium, when the Provisional Government, on 28 September 1830, named Coghen deputy head of the new Federal Finance commission, until the first meeting of the Congress national. Between October 1830 and February 1831, Coghen served on this new Conseil des Commissaires ("Congress of Commissioners") for the new nation's banking. For a short time in the fall of 1830, the new finance commission only had two employees, Coghen and an assistant attorney.

In the first elections for the municipal council in October 1830, Coghen was elected as one of the representatives; he was re-elected in 1836, and served until 1840. At this time, it was his determination not to remain a member of the board, which was caused by the opposition in the assembly regarding the project to rebuild the Palace of Justice in Brussels. The Leopold district project was sponsored by financial companies, particularly by the Civil society for the expansion and beautification of Brussels, of which Coghen was one of the founders.

Coghen also served on the National Congress; he had felt obliged to accept the offer that was made to him. In 1831, he joined the House of Representatives as member from the district of Brussels, and was re-elected in 1833, in 1837, and in 1841. He was defeated in 1845, when the struggle became more intense between the two parties that divided the country, but he was sent in 1848, by the voters in the same district, to the Senate, where he remained a member until his death. He also was one of the vice-presidents of the Senate when he died.

Coghen joined the cabinet of the first Muelenaere Government that was formed by king Leopold I on 24 July 1831. He held the finance portfolio until 20 October 1832. He went through a difficult period marked by the Ten Days' Campaign, a failed attempt to suppress the Belgian revolution by the Dutch king William I between 1 August and 12 August 1831. As Minister of Finance he negotiated and signed on 19 December 1831 an important loan with the London banker Nathan Rotschild that saved the newly born Belgian state from collapse.

He later reorganized some utilities.

On 20 October 1832, the Muelenaere Government fell, and the King called the first Rogier government; thus "Coghen was replaced as the minister of Finances by Auguste Duvivier."

== Return to business and later career ==
After 1832, he returned to private life, when he devoted himself with ardor to some major financial, industrial and commercial enterprises. He became a director and shareholder of the Verreries de Mariemont, in 1835. He was a director of the Société générale de Belgique General Society of Belgium, arguably the most important company that has ever existed in Belgium, which has since been merged into the Suez-Tractebel group. The company had owned very large estates, some of which were sold off to members of the Board. The company invested in banks, coal mining, and utilities. In 1841, he was recorded as having been first appointed an administrateur (member of the board of directors) of the General Society of Belgium, with his title as ancien ministre de finances (former finance minister).

He was also a member of the Board of the Central School of Commerce and Industry.

He had purchased a castle, Wolvendael in Uccle, and land in the Sonian Forest. He made some improvements to the castle, adding three bays.

In 1851, Coghen returned to public life, this time the Senate; it has not been unusual for aristocrats to be elected directly to that position. Previously a Unionist, he broke with the Liberal party and then joined the Catholic party, in the controversy over a new inheritance law. In 1855, he was re-elected to the Senate after returning to the Liberal party, and served as vice-president of the Senate at the time of his death.

== Honours and awards ==
After successfully securing a loan to the Roman Court, Pope Gregory XVI granted him the title of Count. The first king of the Belgians sanctioned this distinction by giving him the rank of Count for himself and the comital title to his male descendants (Royal Decree December 30, 1837).

- Belgium:
  - Iron Cross.
  - Order of Leopold.
    - Officer, 9 June 1937.
    - Commander; 1 June 1845.
- France: Order of the Legion of Honour.
- Portugal: Grand Officer in the Order of Christ

== Death and legacy ==
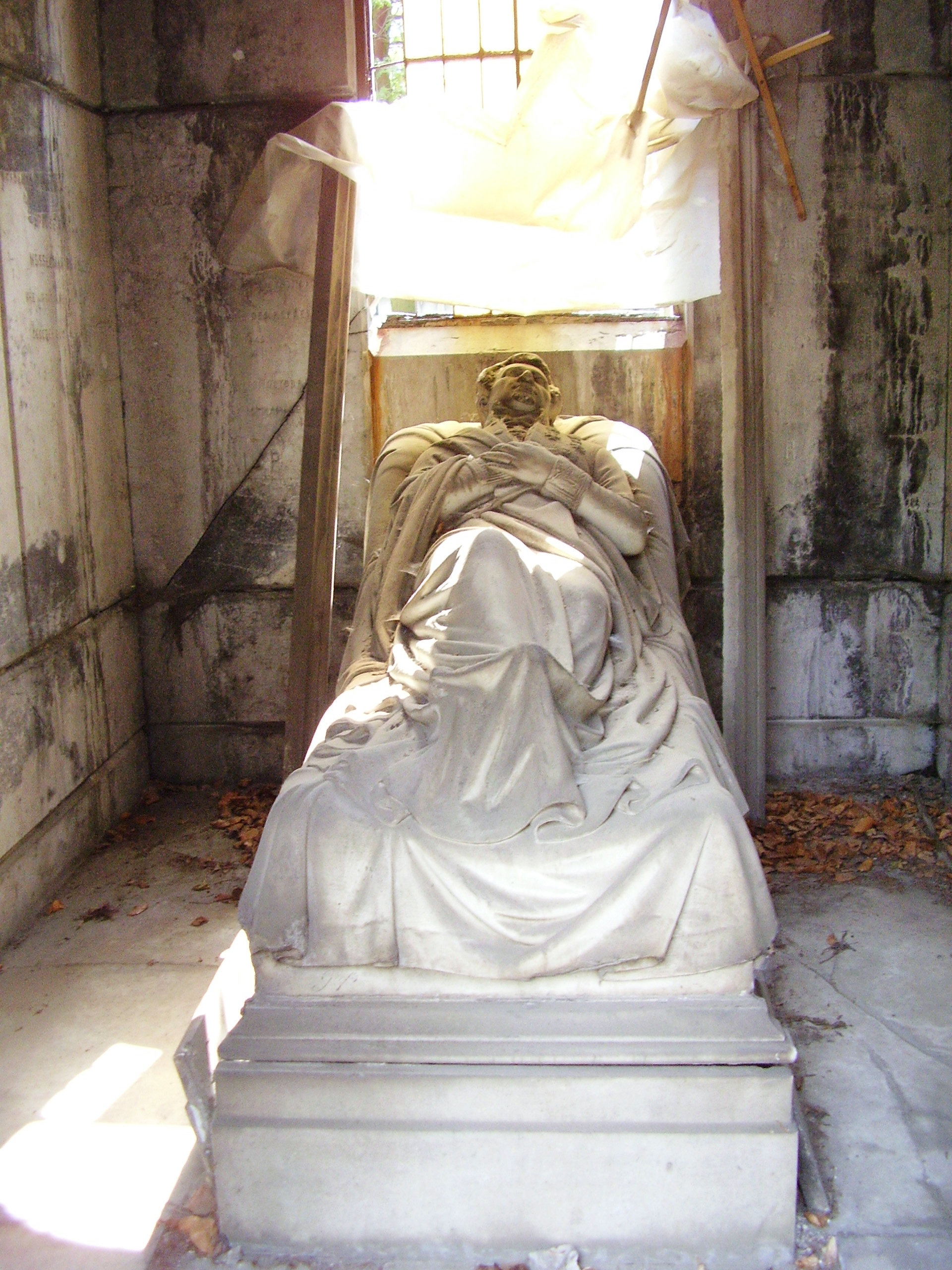
Epitaphe of Jacques Coghen, Cemetery of Laeken (by Guillaume Geefs)

Jacques Coghen died in Lembeek, on 16 May 1858. He is buried at Laeken Cemetery in Brussels. After his death, his family sold his estate at Wolvendael into lots; today, most of his estate is a city park in Uccle, and the old castle retains some improvements made by Coghen.

In 2004, the city of Genk named a street after Coghen.

The local history society of Uccle has a collection of papers by and about Coghen.

His daughter, Isabelle Coghen (1822-1891), married Theodore Mosselman du Chenoy. Their daughter Laura Mosselman du Chenoy married Fulco Tristano Beniamino Ruffo di Calabria (1848-1901). Their son Fulco Ruffo di Calabria was the father of Queen Paola. Through them, Coghen is a great-great-great grandfather of the current King of the Belgians, Phillipe.

== See also ==
- Belgium in the long nineteenth century
- Constitution of Belgium
- Laeken, Belgium, associated with the Belgian Royal family, including Château du Stuyvenberg, Laeken Cemetery, and Royal Castle of Laeken
- List of members of the National Congress of Belgium
- List of members of the Senate of Belgium
- Senate (Belgium)
