= Minister van staat =

Minister van Staat (Dutch, 'Minister of State') may refer to:

- Minister of State (Netherlands)
- Minister of State (Belgium)
