= Charles Graux =

Charles Graux may refer to:

- Charles Graux (classicist) (1852–1882), French classicist
- Charles Graux (politician) (1837–1910), Belgian politician
