= Charleroi-Thuin (Chamber of Representatives constituency) =

Belgian political subdivision

Charleroi-Thuin was a constituency used to elect members of the Belgian Chamber of Representatives between 1995 and 2003.

== Representatives ==
| Election | Representative (Party) | Representative (Party) | Representative (Party) | Representative (Party) | Representative (Party) | Representative (Party) | Representative (Party) | Representative (Party) | Representative (Party) |
| 1995 | Formed from a merger of Charleroi and Thuin | | | | | | | | |
|---|---|---|---|---|---|---|---|---|---|
| 1995 | Jean-Pol Henry (PS) | Patrick Moriau (PS) | José Canon (PS) | Hugues Wailliez (FN) | Marceau Mairesse (cdH) | Philippe Maystadt (cdH) | Philippe Dallons (Ecolo) | Philippe Seghin (PRL) | Véronique Cornet (PRL) |
| 1999 | Jean-Pol Henry (PS) | Patrick Moriau (PS) | José Canon (PS) | Daniel Féret (FN) | Bernard Baille (Ecolo) | Jean-Jacques Viseur (cdH) | Mirella Minne (Ecolo) | Philippe Seghin (PRL) | Olivier Chastel (PRL) |
