= Victor Jacobs =

Belgian politician

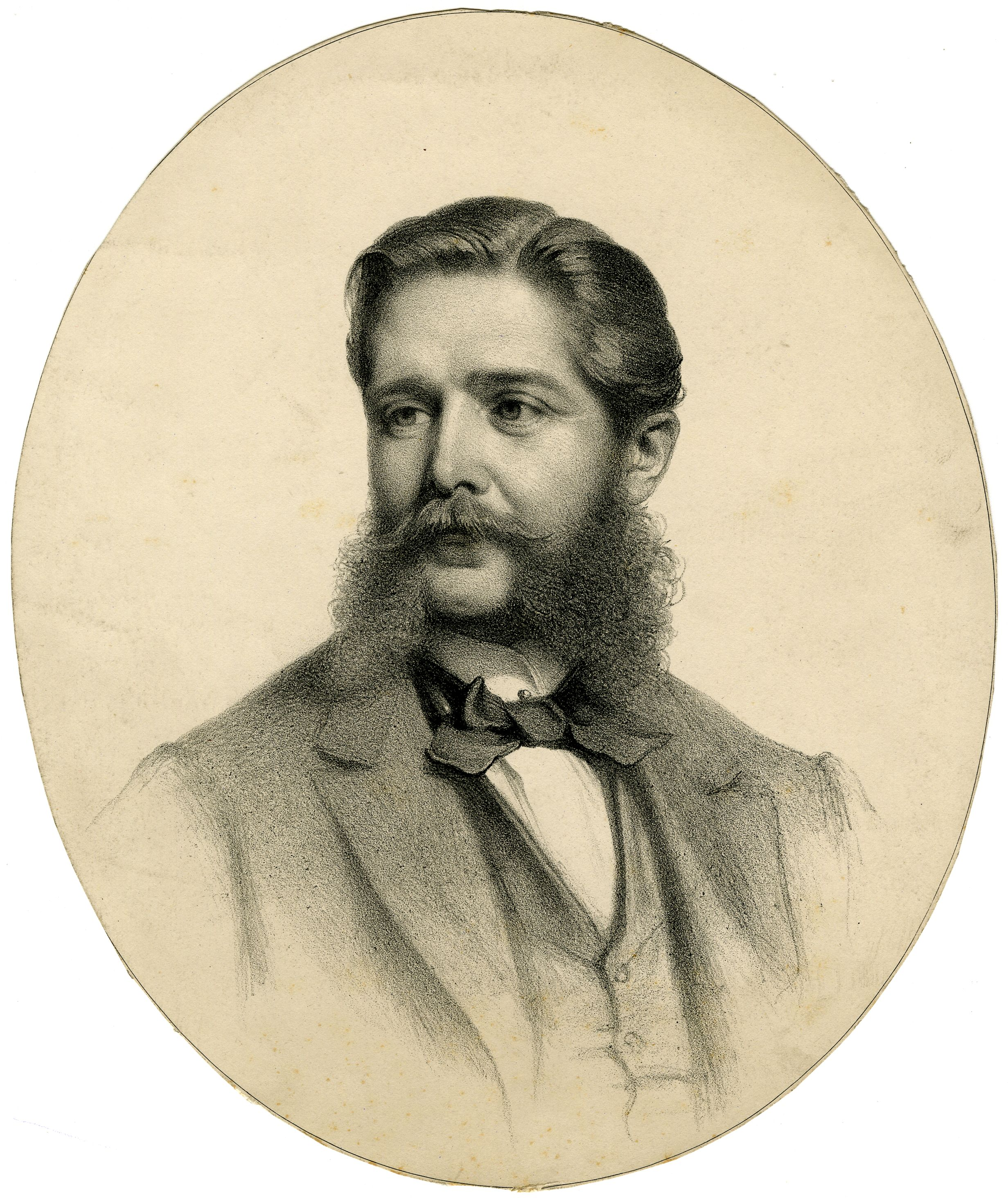
Portrait of Victor Jacobs

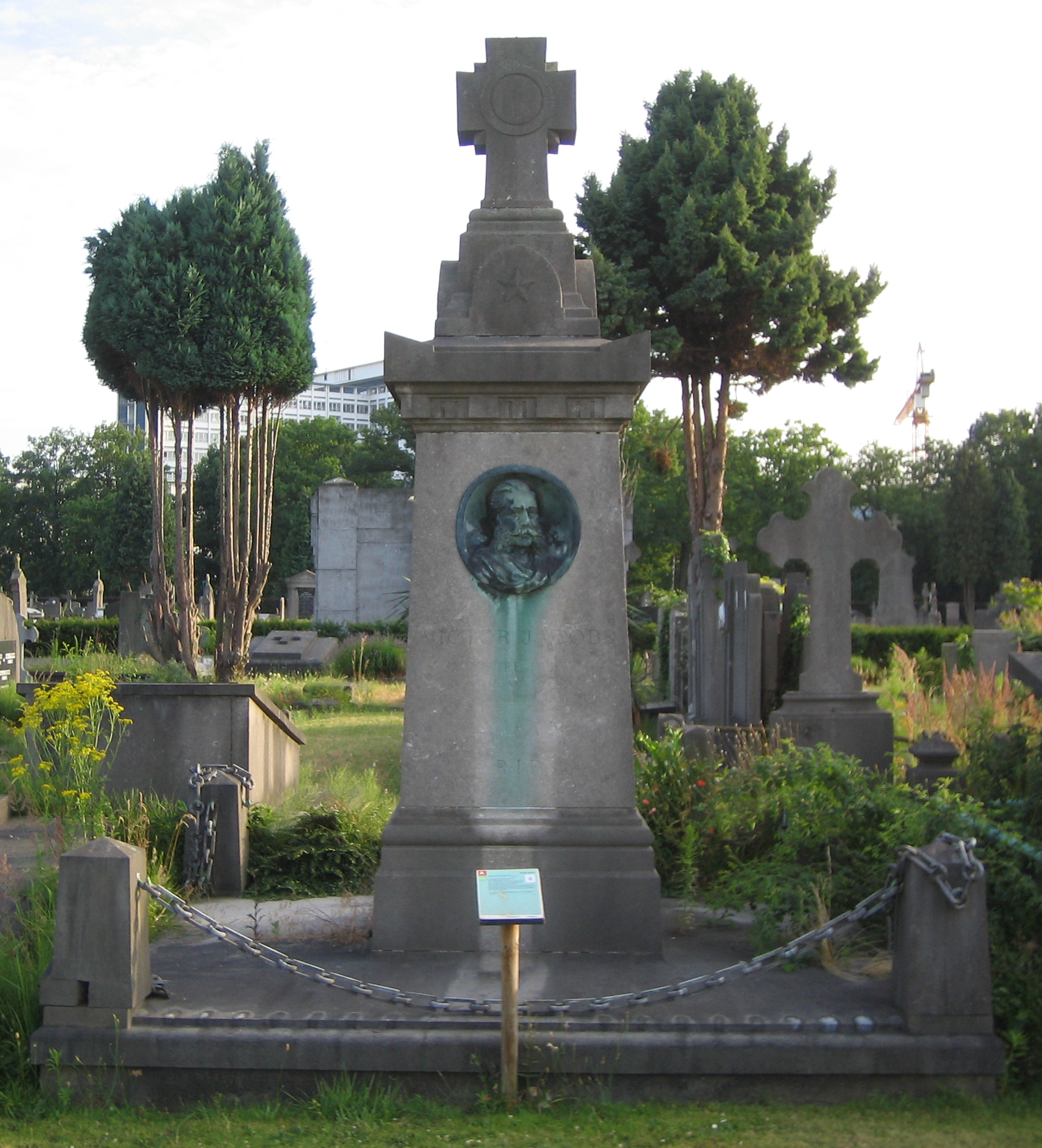
Grave monument in Berchem, Antwerp

Philippe Marie Victor Jacobs (18 January 1838 in Antwerp – 20 December 1891 in Saint-Gilles) was a Belgian politician and Minister for the Catholic Party.

He was the son of Pierre Jacobs and Marie Van Merlen. Pierre was president of the Bar of Lawyers in Antwerp. Victor married Valentine Bernard. He graduated in 1860 and a doctorate in law and settled from 1860 to 1876 as a lawyer in Antwerp, then from 1877 to 1891 in Brussels.

Jacobs holds a degree in doctor of law. He was a high-level manager in several companies, including banks, coal mines, and railways.

From 1863 to 1890, he was a member of the Chamber of Representatives for the district of Antwerp: first for the Antwerp Meeting Party and then for the Catholic Party.

In 1870, Jacobs served on an interim basis as Minister of Public Works. He also served from 1870 to 1871 as Minister of Finance. He also served as the Minister of Interior and Public Education. In 1888, he was appointed by Prime Minister Auguste Beernaert as a Minister of State, an honorary title for life.
