= Lydia De Pauw =

Belgian politician

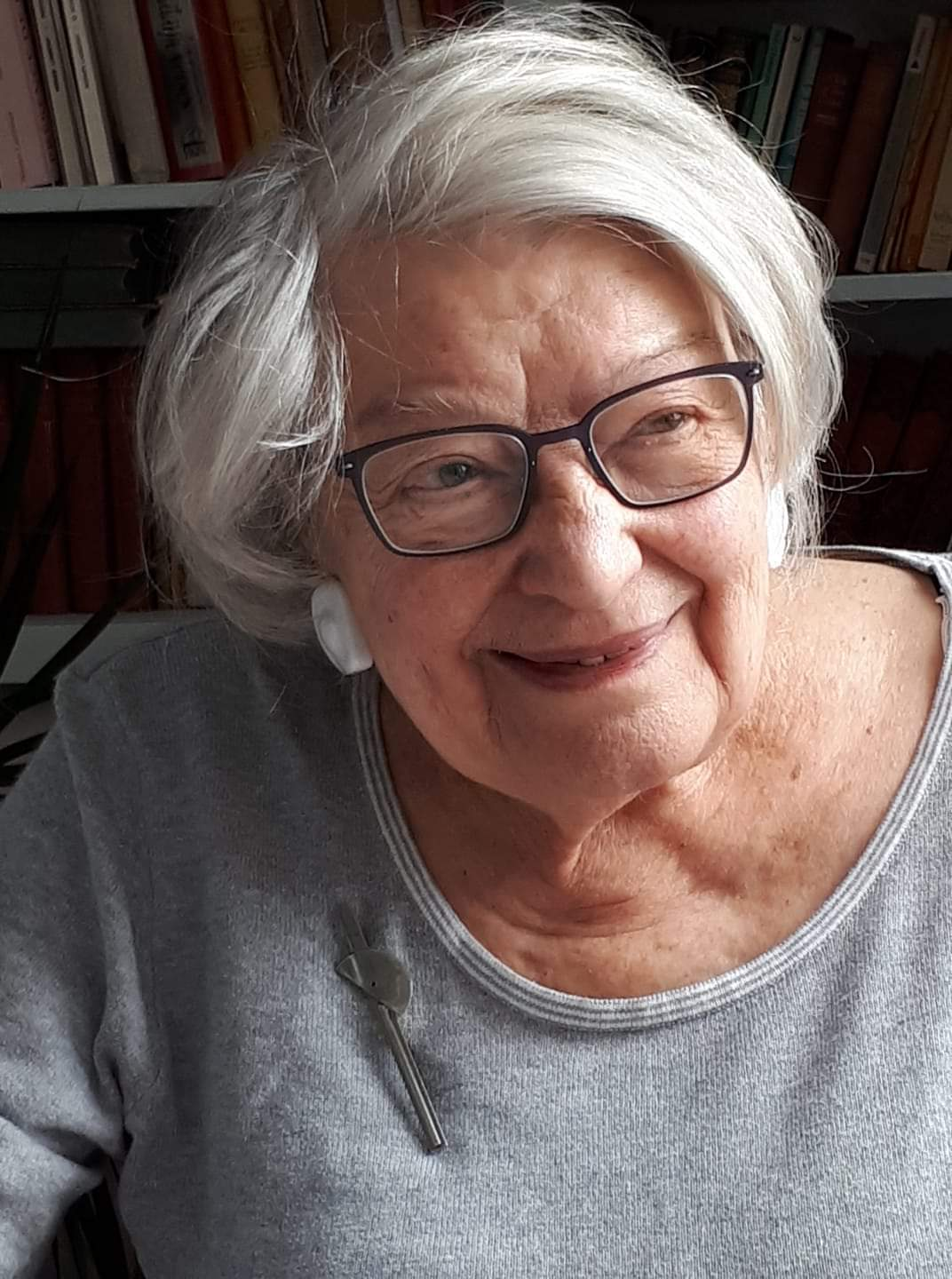
Lydia De Pauw

Lydia De Pauw-Deveen (born 26 June 1929) is a Belgian who served in the Senate as a Socialist. She also served in Martens I Government as Secretary of State - Brussels Affairs.
