= Léandre Desmaisières =

Belgian politician

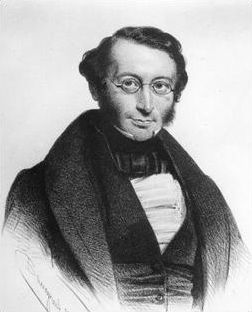
Léandre Desmaisières (between 1835 and 1842)

Léandre Joseph Antoine Desmaisières (9 September 1794 – 27 May 1864) was a Belgian politician.

== Biography ==
=== Early life ===
Born in Düsseldorf, Germany, Leander Desmaisières belongs to an ancient family of Hainaut, including several members were Provost Marshals Tournai; one of his ancestors, Jean Desmaisières, Lord of Vassal, was deputy to the States General held in Brussels in 1633.

=== Military career ===
Desmaisières studied at the École Polytechnique in Paris from 1812 to 1814. In 1814-1815, he was a lieutenant in the troops of the Count of Artois and subsequently (1815-1824) engineer officer in the army of the United Kingdom of the Netherlands.

The revolution of 1830 found him married and settled in Ghent where he was incorporated into the civic guard. His military background, public esteem he enjoyed made him successively elected captain, major, and finally on 13 June 1831, colonel of the second legion of

=== Political career ===
The services rendered by Leander Desmaisières came under difficult circumstances, all of which increased greatly its recognition and popularity in Ghent. On 6 November 1832 he was elected to the Chamber of Representatives, a position he would hold until 1847.

In this meeting called to practice the principles of constitutional liberty passed by Congress, Leander Desmaisières was, for several consecutive years, in charge of the budget report of the war, including that of 1838.

He intervened in the discussion of laws on the establishment of a military school, on the position and advancement of officers and military pensions. He also proposed solutions to various issues related to industry and finance.

It is at the top of the twenty-three signatories of the proposal was intended to establish a protective tariff for the cotton industry.

In 1837, the member for Ghent was selected for Rapporteur of the commission to investigate defects in the legislation on sugars; the conclusions of the report are adopted after a lively discussion.

Around the same time, he took a great part in the discussion of the tariff on cattle, and in that of the general law on transit.

MP Ghent was the rapporteur of the central section to the bill that increased the admission of foreign paintings (Act of 1834), which was a simple right balance of one percent from the Dutch fare. His work, embracing all matters relating to the flax industry, and indicating means, practiced subsequently to mitigate the effects of flax crisis we could already foresee the appearance of the introduction of new work mechanical, was passed by the House, despite opposition from ministers.

The adoption of the law prepared the conclusion of a trade agreement with France. This measure came to the aid of weavers and spinners of Flanders. We also saw the export of their products in 1833, only reached a value of 8 million Belgian francs, rising in 1838 to twice that value.

It was also in 1838 that was established under the chairmanship of Leander Desmaisières, the Association for the Advancement of the flax industry, who rendered great service to the working class during the crises caused by the processing industry. This association were born all these committees, these workshops apprenticeships, manufacturing these schools.

In 1839, the member was appointed government commissioner at the Banque de Belgique for the loan of four million Belgian francs. French shareholders wished to request the dissolution and liquidation of the company. Leander Desmaisières much to change the resolution. In return, shareholders spontaneously proposed to the king to his appointment as director of the bank.

He was convinced that the major powers of the world made rather generous conditions in the 1839 Tready of London and thus he voted in favor with reservations which were granted in part by the conference, particularly as regards the boundaries of Luxembourg the following gauging barrels fixing entitlement to the Scheldt and the Terneuzen canal.

The ministers were then Barthélémy de Theux, Jean-Pierre Willmar, Jean-Baptiste Nothomb.

== Timeline of career ==
From 1824, he was working in industry in Ghent.

- In Belgium, he launched a career in politics. He was successively or simultaneously:
- 1832-1847: Catholic member of parliament for the Ghent district;
- 1843-1848: Provincial Governor of East Flanders;
- 1852-1861: Member of Parliament for the district Eeklo.

Desmaisières became minister:

- Minister of Finance (5 April 1839 - 6 April 1840) in the Government of Barthélémy de Theux de Meylandt;
- Minister of Public Works (13 April 1841 - 15 April 1843) in the government of Jean-Baptiste Nothomb;
- Minister of War, ad interim (from 5 to 15 April 1843)

== Honours ==
- Commander in the Order of Leopold.
- Knight Grand Cross in the Order of Charles III.
- Grand Officer in the Legion of Honour.

== Bibliography ==
- R. DE VULDERE, Biografisch repertorium der Belgische parlementairen, senatoren en volksvertegenwoordigers, 1830-1965, licentiaantsverhandeling (onuitgegeven), RUG, 1965.
- Jean-Luc DE PAEPE & Christiane RAINDORF-GERARD, Le Parlement belge, 1831-1894. Données biographiques, Brussel, 1996.
- Eugène Bochart, Biographie des membres des deux chambres législatives, session 1857-1858, Bruxelles, M. Périchon, 1858.
