= Albert-Édouard Janssen =

Belgian politician, banker and professor

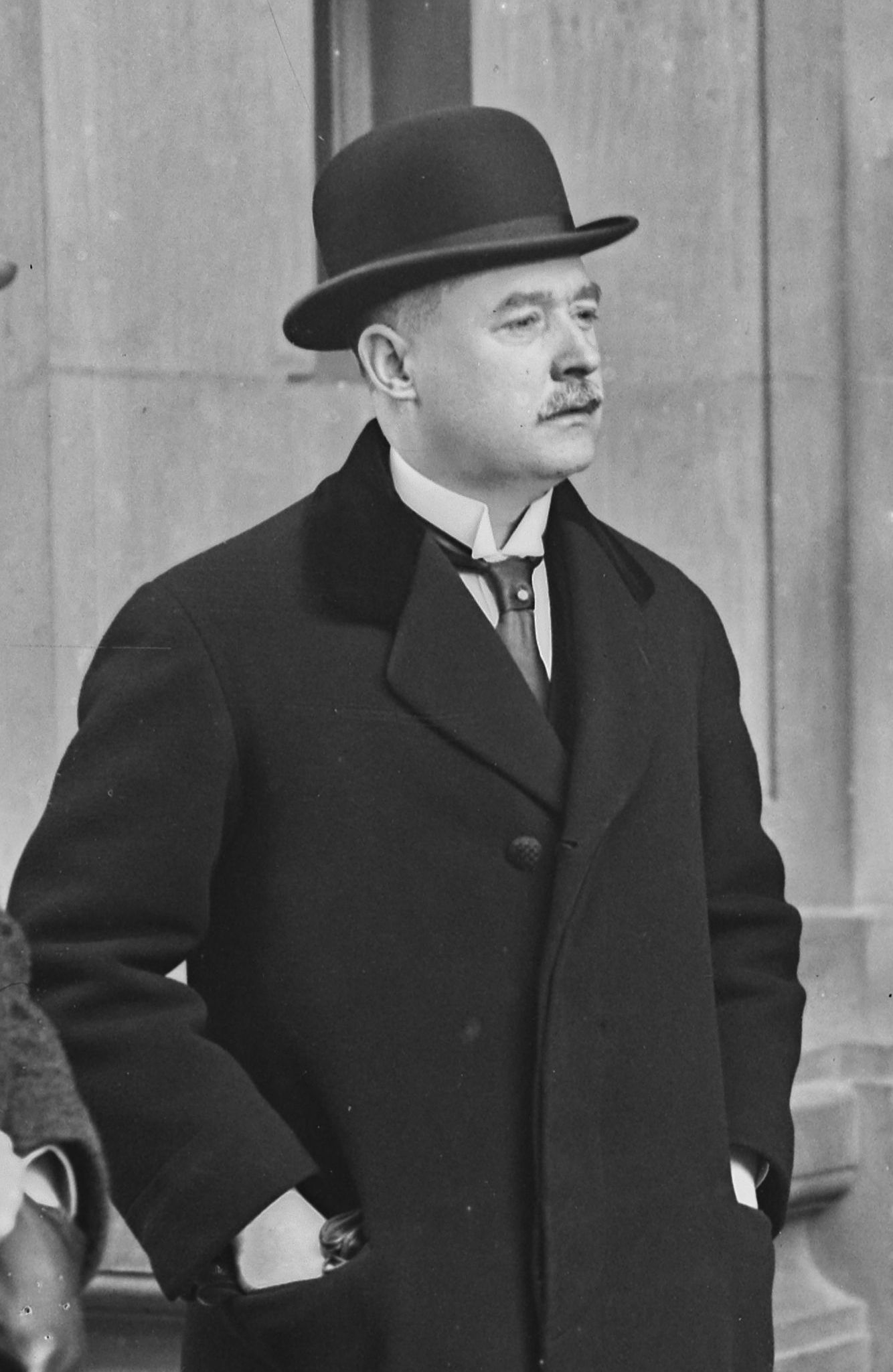
- Born: 1 April 1883; Antwerp, Belgium
- Died: 29 March 1966 (aged 82); Valduc Castle, Hamme-Mille, Belgium
- Occupations: politician, banker, professor
- Known for: monetary theory and banking and financial sciences

Albert-Édouard Janssen was a Belgian politician, banker and professor born in Antwerp, Belgium on 1 April 1883 and died in Valduc Castle in Hamme-Mille, Belgium on 29 March 1966.

== Biography ==
Albert Edward studied law and political and diplomatic sciences at the Catholic University of Leuven. In 1911, he was one of the first to graduate with a doctorate from the School of Political Sciences. He then became a teacher at this school until 1919 where he taught at the Faculty of Law. In 1907, he was selected for an internship with Henri Carton de Wiart and was registered in 1910 in the Bar Association. He did not continue his career at the bar, however, as he returned to the National Bank of Belgium. He participated in the work of the Hague Conference. In 1914, he was appointed Secretary of the Bank.

During the war, he was associated with the resistance to occupying forces, and social policy in helping small pensioners and the popular classes.

In 1919 he was appointed director of the National Bank of Belgium and stayed until 1925.

He participated in several commissions, including the Reparation Commission in Paris, France. In 1924, he was selected to represent Belgium at the Committee of Experts of the Dawes Plan. In 1925, he became Minister of Finance in the cabinet of Prosper Poullet. However, he resigned the following year after his failed attempt to stabilize the currency. In 1929, he was elected President of the Gold Commission, however, created by the Finance Committee of the League of Nations which Janssen also chaired.

He received mandates in the public sector such as the Société Nationale de Crédit à l'Industrie as a director, Commission du Ducroire (Commission Ducroire) as president, Caisse générale d'épargne et de retraite as a member of the steering committee. He did the same in the private sector: the Banque générale belge (Belgian General Bank), the Société belge de banque (Belgian Banking Society), Antwerp Diamond Bank, the 'Union générale belge d'électricité, (Belgian General Union for Electricity), the l'Union chimique belge (Belgian Chemical Union) and the Compagnie belge d'assurances générales. (Belgian General Insurance Company).

In 1935, he reorganized the Banque belge du Travail (Belgian Labour Bank) and led the restructuring of the Boerenbond farmers movement's banking assets, including the liquidation of the Middenkredietkas and the merger of Algemeene Bankvereeniging and Bank voor Handel en Nijverheid Kortrijk to form Kredietbank. In 1938, he was appointed Finance minister in the cabinet of Paul-Henri Spaak. Three months later, the cabinet was dissolved.

During the war, he again was asked to administer social assistance benefits to households, victims, deportees and especially mothers. He founded at the end of the war the national tribute to the Mother of Family. He was also director of Caritas Catholica Belgica and president of École et Famille (School and Family). He presided over the Comité National de l'Épargne Mobilière. (National Home Savings Committee).

He was appointed Minister of State in June 1949 and again Minister of Finance from 1952 to 1954. He participated in negotiations to mitigate inflationary pressure that the European Payments Union exercised over Belgium. During his tenure, he tried to balance budgets and consolidate debt.

Two years later, he was co-opted in the Belgian Senate by the Christian Social Party. Until the end of his life he continued his professions of banking and teaching. He also had warrants from the Bank for International Settlements in Basel, the International Chamber of Commerce and the Conseil de la Fédération bancaire (Council of the Banking Federation) of the European Community.

== Honors ==
Grand Cordon of the Order of Leopold, Grand Cross of the Order of the Crown, Croix de guerre 1939–1945 (with Bronze Lion), Medal of the Armed Resistance 1940–1945, Médaille du Résistant civil 1940–1945 (Medal of Civil Resistance 1940–1945), Médaille d'or de la Reconnaissance belge 1940–1945 (Gold Belgian Recognition 1940–1945), Commemorative Medal of the 1940–1945 War (with two crossed lightning bolts), Croix civique de 1re classe (Civic Cross 1st class), Décoration industrielle de 1er classe (Industrial Decoration First Class).

Grand cross of the Order of St. Sylvester (Holy See), Grand Cross of the Order of St. Gregory the Great (Holy See), Grand Cross of the Order of Orange-Nassau (Netherlands), Grand cordon of the Order of Merit Austrian, Grand cordon of 1st class of the Order of the Golden Sword (China), Grand Cordon of the Order of the Eagle of Estonia, Commander 1st degree Order of Jade (China), Commander of the Order of the Oak Crown (Luxembourg), Grand officer of the Order of Polonia Restituta (Poland), Grand officer of the Order of the Crown of Italy, Officer of the Legion of Honour (France).

=== Janssen Prize ===
The Janssen Prize was instituted by the Belgian Association of Banks and rewards any original work in the field of monetary theory and banking and financial sciences.

== Publications of Albert Edward Janssen ==
- Les conventions monétaires (Monetary policies), Brussels, Larcier, 1911 569p.
- "Le Gold Point" (The Gold Point), in Journal of scientific questions, in April 1914.
- "Le problème de l'or en 1934" (The Problem of Gold in 1934) in Bulletin of the Institute of Economics of the University of Louvain, p. 471. Paper Reason for Janssen family Mouland – four centuries of notes and memories (1500–1925)

== Bibliography ==
- Authority records: Virtual International Authority File • International Standard Name Identifier • Library of Congress • Gemeinsame Normdatei • WorldCat • University System Documentation
- Plater-Zyberk (Countess), Albert Edward Janssen told by his daughter, Beauvechain, ed Oyez, 1976, 296 p.
- of VOGHEL (Baron), "Janssen Albert Edward," in National Biography, vol. XXXIX, Brussels, 1976, p. 499-505.
