= Laurent Veydt =

Belgian politician and lawyer

Laurent François Félix Veydt (7 August 1800 – 22 November 1877) was a liberal Belgian Member of Parliament and a Minister.

== Biography ==
Veydt was born in Antwerp on 7 August 1880 to Laurent-Guillaume Veydt and Marie-Françoise van Merlen.

Veydt held a Doctor of Law degree. He was a lawyer and company director. He was a major shareholder of the company Société Générale de Belgique, one of the largest Belgian companies at the time.

He was schepen (member of the municipal executive) for the city of Antwerp (1830–1832) and served as a deputy (member of the provincial executive) for the province of Antwerp for two terms; the first term from 1836 to 1838 and the second term from 1841 to 1846.

He was elected as a Liberal representative for the district of Antwerp in 1845 and held this office until 1859.

From 1847 to 1848, he was Minister of Finance. He retired for health reasons and became director at the Société Générale de Belgique.

After his accession to the leadership of the Société Générale, he served in various capacities of directories of various companies.

== Bibliography ==
- E. JACQUES, Un parlementaire et homme d'affaires passionné de culture au XIXe siècle, Laurent Veydt, in: Bulletin de la Classe des Lettres et des Sciences morales et politiques de l'Académie royale de Belgique, 1983.
- Jean-Luc DE PAEPE & Christiane RAINDORF-GERARD, Le Parlement belge, 1831–1894, Brussel, 1996.
