= Minister of Finance (Belgium) =

Federal cabinet office in Belgium

This is the list of Finance ministers in the Belgian Federal Cabinet. The current De Wever Government includes Jan Jambon as Finance minister.

The minister oversees the Federal Public Service Finance (Dutch: Federale Overheidsdienst Financiën; French: Service public fédéral Finances).

== List of ministers ==
=== 1831 to 1899 ===
- 1831 Charles de Brouckère (LP)
- 1831–1832 Jacques Coghen (LP)
- 1832–1834 Auguste Duvivier (technocrat)
- 1834–1839 Edouard d'Huart (LP)
- 1839–1840 Léandre Desmaisières (PC)
- 1840–1841 Edouard Mercier (LP)
- 1841 Camille de Briey (PC)
- 1841–1843 Jean Baptiste Smits (PC)
- 1843–1845 Edouard Mercier (LP)
- 1845–1847 Jules Malou (PC)
- 1847–1848 Laurent Veydt (LP)
- 1848–1852 Walthère Frère-Orban (LP)
- 1852–1855 Charles Liedts (LP)
- 1855–1857 Edouard Mercier (LP)
- 1857–1870 Walthère Frère-Orban (LP)
- 1870 Pierre Tack (PC)
- 1870–1871 Victor Jacobs (PC)
- 1871–1878 Jules Malou (PC)
- 1878–1884 Charles Graux (LP)
- 1884 Jules Malou (PC)
- 1884–1894 Auguste Beernaert (PC)
- 1894–1899 Paul de Smet de Naeyer (PC)
- 1899 Julien Liebaert (PC)

=== 1900 to 1999 ===
- 1899–1907 Paul de Smet de Naeyer (PC)
- 1907–1911 Julien Liebaert (PC)
- 1911–1914 Michel Levie (PC)
- 1914–1918 Aloys Van de Vyvere (PC)
- 1918–1920 Léon Delacroix (PC)
- 1920–1925 Georges Theunis (PC)
- 1925 Aloys Van de Vyvere (PC)
- 1925–1926 Albert-Edouard Janssen (PC)
- 1926–1932 Maurice Houtart (PC)
- 1932 Jules Renkin (PC)
- 1932–1934 Henri Jaspar (PC)
- 1934 Gustave Sap (PC)
- 1934–1935 Camille Gutt (technocrat)
- 1935–1936 Max-Léo Gérard (LP)
- 1936–1938 Henri De Man (BWP)
- 1938 Eugène Soudan (POB)
- 1938 Max-Léo Gérard (LP)
- 1938–1939 Albert-Edouard Janssen (PC)
- 1939–1945 Camille Gutt (technocrat)
- 1945 Gaston Eyskens (CVP)
- 1945–1946 Franz de Voghel (technocrat)
- 1946–1947 Jean Vauthier (technocrat)
- 1947–1949 Gaston Eyskens (CVP)
- 1949–1950 Henri Liebaert (LP)
- 1950–1952 Jean Van Houtte (CVP)
- 1952–1954 Albert-Edouard Janssen (CVP)
- 1954–1958 Henri Liebaert (LP)
- 1958–1961 Jean Van Houtte (CVP)
- 1961–1965 André Dequae (CVP)
  - 1961–1962 Jean-François Tielemans (assistant for finance) (BSP)
  - 1963–1965 Henri Deruelles (assistant for finance) (PSB)
- 1965–1966 Gaston Eyskens (CVP)
- 1966–1968 Robert Henrion (PLP)
- 1968–1971 Jean-Charles Snoy et d'Oppuers (PSC)
- 1972 André Vlerick (CVP)
- 1973–1974 Willy De Clercq (PVV)
- 1974–1977 Willy De Clercq (financiën) (PVV)
- 1977–1980 Gaston Geens (CVP)
- 1980 Robert Henrion (PRL)
- 1980 Paul Hatry (PRL)
  - 1980 Freddy Willockx (BSP) (State Secretary)
- 1980–1981 Mark Eyskens (CVP)
- 1981 Robert Vandeputte (technocrat)
- 1981–1985 Willy De Clercq (PVV)
- 1985 Frans Grootjans (PVV)
  - 1985 Etienne Knoops (PRL) (assistant for finance)
  - 1985 Louis Waltniel (PVV) (State Secretary)
- 1985–1988 Mark Eyskens (CVP)
- 1988–1998 Philippe Maystadt (PSC)
  - 1988 Herman Van Rompuy (CVP) (State Secretary)
- 1998–1999 Jean-Jacques Viseur (PSC)

=== Since 2000 ===
- 1999–2011 Didier Reynders (MR)
  - 2000–2003 Alain Zenner (MR) (State Secretary)
  - 2003–2007 Hervé Jamar (MR) (State Secretary for Modernisation of Finances and Battle against Fiscal Fraud)
  - 2008–2011 Bernard Clerfayt (MR) (State Secretary)
  - 2008–2011 Carl Devlies (CD&V) (State Secretary for Coordination of Fraud Action)
- 2011–2013 Steven Vanackere (CD&V)
  - 2011–2014 John Crombez (sp.a) (State Secretary for Fraud Action)
- 2013–2014 Koen Geens (CD&V)
- 2014–2018 Johan Van Overtveldt (N-VA)
- 2018–2020 Alexander De Croo (Open VLD)
- 2020–2025 Vincent Van Peteghem (CD&V)
- 2025–present Jan Jambon (N-VA)
