= Jean Baptiste Smits =

Belgian politician

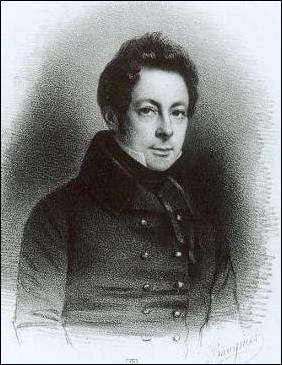

Jean Baptiste Smits (Antwerp, April 10, 1792–Arlon, May 3, 1857) was a Belgian Member of Parliament and minister.

== Biography ==
Smits was a son of Henri-Joseph Smits and Isabelle Verrept. He was married twice. He had four sons with his first wife. He began his career as a clerk at the Commercial Court (1806–1808). He was:

- Bureau chief in the prefecture of Deux-Nèthes (1808–1814);
- Division Chief in the City Administration of Antwerp (1814–1830);
- Secretary of the Regence Council (October 1830–February 1831);
- Belgian delegate to the London Conference (1832);
- Director of Trade and Industry at the Ministry of the Interior (1832–1839) under Prime Minister Joseph Lebeau; He negotiated several international (trade) agreements for Belgium in 1833 and was a strong supporter of the construction of railway in the country. He pleaded to prohibitive customs duties and was appointed to his expertise in 1839 to:
- Director of the National Bank during the financial crisis (1839–1841).

He also had a political career. In 1833 he was elected unionist representative for the Antwerp district and held this office until 1845. From August 1841 until April 1843 he was Minister of Finance.

He became Provincial Governor of Luxembourg in 1843 and held this office until his death.

== Bibliography ==
- Fernand DONNET, Jean Baptiste Smolders, in: Biographie nationale de Belgique, T. XXII, Brussel, 1920.
- Jean-Luc DE PAEPE & Christiane RAINDORF-GERARD, Le Parlement Belge, 1831-1894, Brussel, 1996.
