= Lot, Belgium =

Coordinates: 50°46′N 4°16′E

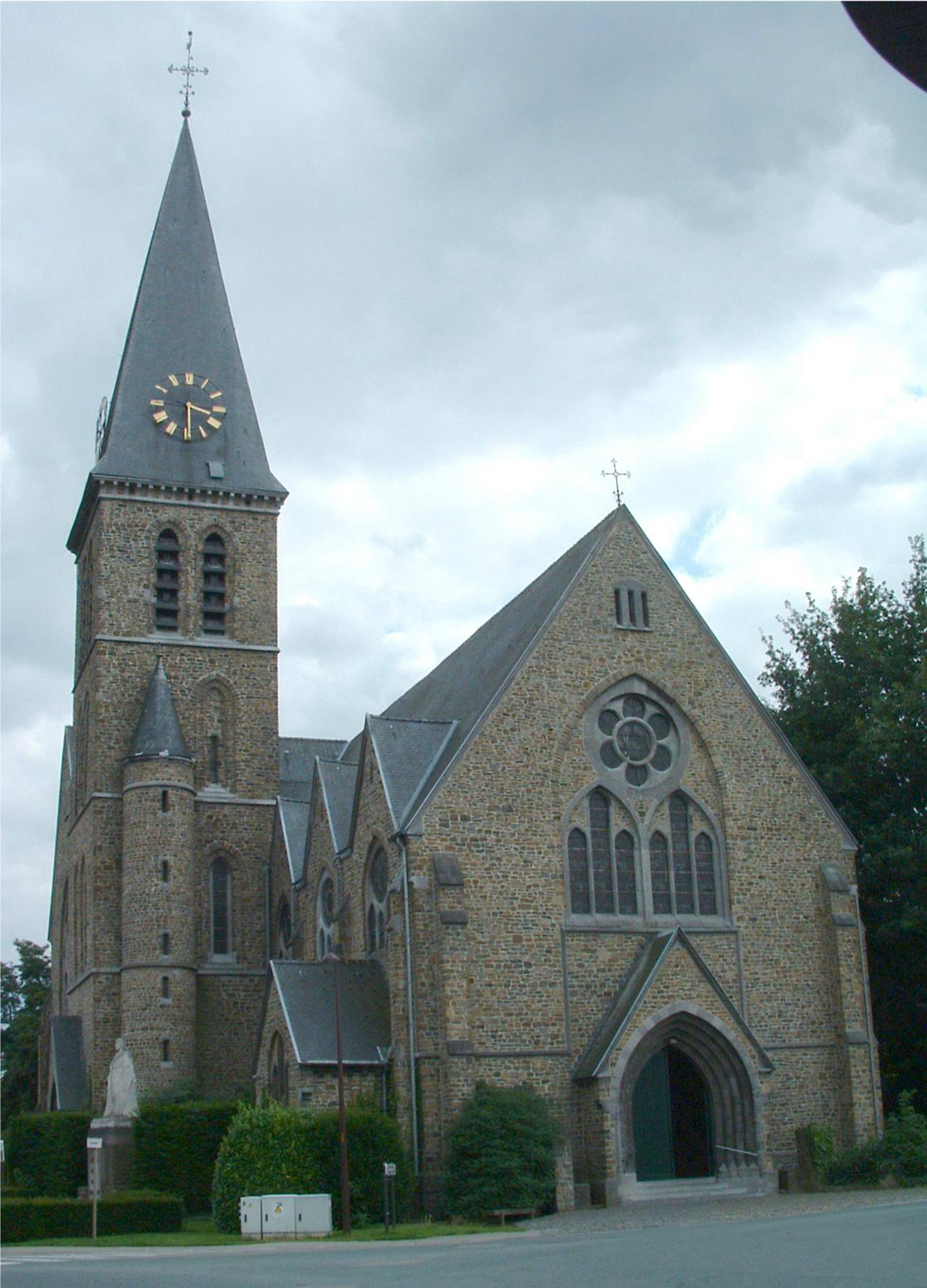
Parochiekerk Sint-Jozef

Lot is a village in the municipality of Beersel, Belgium. A formerly autonomous village, it was merged with the villages of Beersel, Alsemberg, Dworp, and Huizingen to create the Beersel municipality. On the northwestern edge of Beersel, it is bordered by the Brussels–Charleroi Canal.

Notable residents include Renaat Van Elslande, the former mayor of Lot from 1947 to 1976. He went on to become the first Flemish foreign minister in Belgium's history.
