= Luc Van den Brande =

Former Flemish minister-president

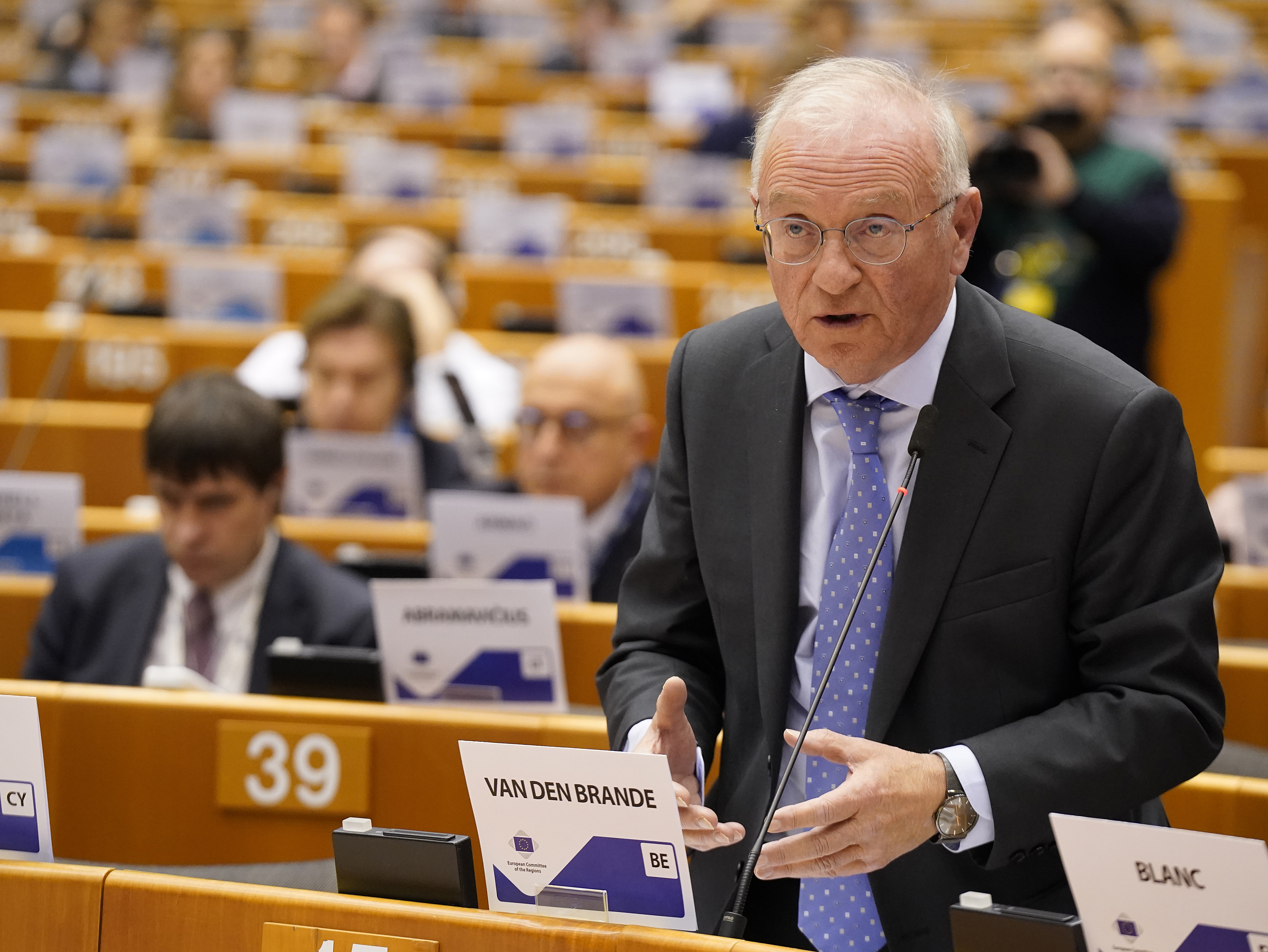

Minister-President of Flanders
- In office 21 January 1992 – 13 July 1999
- Preceded by: Gaston Geens
- Succeeded by: Patrick Dewael

Personal details
- Born: 13 October 1945 (age 80) Mechelen, Belgium
- Party: Christian Democratic and Flemish
- Spouse: Maria Baelus
- Children: 3 (and 6 grandchildren)
- Education: Catholic University of Leuven

Luc Van den Brande (born 13 October 1945) is a Flemish politician, member of the CD&V and was Minister-president of Flanders from 21 January 1992 until 13 July 1999. He took the initiative to create the Flanders Institute for Biotechnology (VIB). On 6 February 2008 he became President of the European Union's Committee of the Regions for a period of two years.

== Studies ==
- Doctor in Law (KUL) (1969)
- Licence of Notary (KUL) (1969)
- Lawyer, Mechelen Bar (1970–1988)

== Political career ==
=== Parliamentarian mandates ===
- Member of the Belgian House of Representatives for the district of Mechelen (1977–1991)
- Leader of the Christian Democratic group CVP (1985–1988)
- Member of the Council of Culture and the Flemish Council (12 May 1977 – 21 May 1995)
- Senator for the district of Mechelen-Turnhout (1991–1995)
- Member of the Flemish Parliament for Mechelen-Turnhout (13 June 1995 – 4 July 1995) (16 July 1999–)
- President of the Commission for Foreign and European Affairs (1999–2004)
- Member of the Flemish Parliament for the province of Antwerp since June 2004
- Community Senator (13 October 1999–)
- Member of the Federal advisory Committee on European Affairs

=== Governmental functions ===
- Federal Minister of Employment and Labour (9 May 1988 – 21 January 1992)
- President of the Government of Flanders and Minister for Economic Affairs, Small and Medium-Sized Business, Science Policy, Energy and Foreign Relations (21 January 1992 – 30 January 1992)
- Minister-President of the Government of Flanders and Minister for Economic Affairs, Small and Medium-Sized Business, Science Policy, Energy and Foreign Relations (30 January 1992 – 20 June 1995)
- Minister-President of the Government of Flanders, Minister for Foreign Policy, European Affairs, Science and Technology (20 June 1995 – 13 July 1999)

=== European mandates and responsibilities ===
- Member of the Bureau of the Assembly of European Regions (1992–1994)
- Vice-president (1994–1996) and president (1996–2000) of the Assembly of European Regions
- Member of the Committee of the Regions (since 1994)
- Vice-president of the Committee of the Regions (1994–1998) (2000–2002) – Head of the Belgian delegation (2002–2006)
- First Vice-president of the Committee of the Regions (2006–2008)
- President of the Committee of the Regions of the EU (2008–)
- Leader of the Christian Democratic Group in the Advisory Inter-parliamentary Council of the Benelux countries (2000–2008 )

=== Council of Europe ===
- Effective member of the Parliamentary Assembly of the Council of Europe (2001–)
- Vice-president of the Parliamentary Assembly (2003–2004)
- President of the Group EPP/CD in the Parliamentary Assembly (2005–) and thus also member of the Presidential Committee, the Bureau and the Standing Committee
- Effective member of the Political Affaires Committee and the Committee on the Honouring of obligations and commitments by member states, known as the Monitoring Committee;
- Member of various subcommittees
- Several times rapporteur on various occasions, e.g. monitoring of Turkey and the Russian Federation
- Leader of the observatory delegation for the legislative elections and of ad hoc committees
- Representative of the Parliamentarian Assembly at the Committee of Ministers for the negotiations concerning the MOU between the Council and the UE
- President of the Council for Democratic Elections of the Venice Commission

=== Western European Union ===
- Effective member of the Assembly of the Western European Union (2001–2009)

== Other representations ==
- Co-President of the Euro-Mediterranean Regional and Local Assembly (ARLEM)(2010–)
- Extraordinary Professor on Politic institutions – KU Leuven (2000–2005)
- President Flanders Technology International
- President Lemmens Institute
- President International Association Anton van Wilderode

== Political and social interest ==
- General politics, economic, scientific and technological policies, State reforms, European and foreign policy

== Honours ==
- 2007 : Knight Grand Cross in the Order of Leopold II.
- 1999 : Grand Officer in the Order of Leopold.

Political offices
Preceded by Gaston Geens	Minister-President of Flanders; 1992–1999	Succeeded by Patrick Dewael
