= Maurice Houtart =

Belgian politician

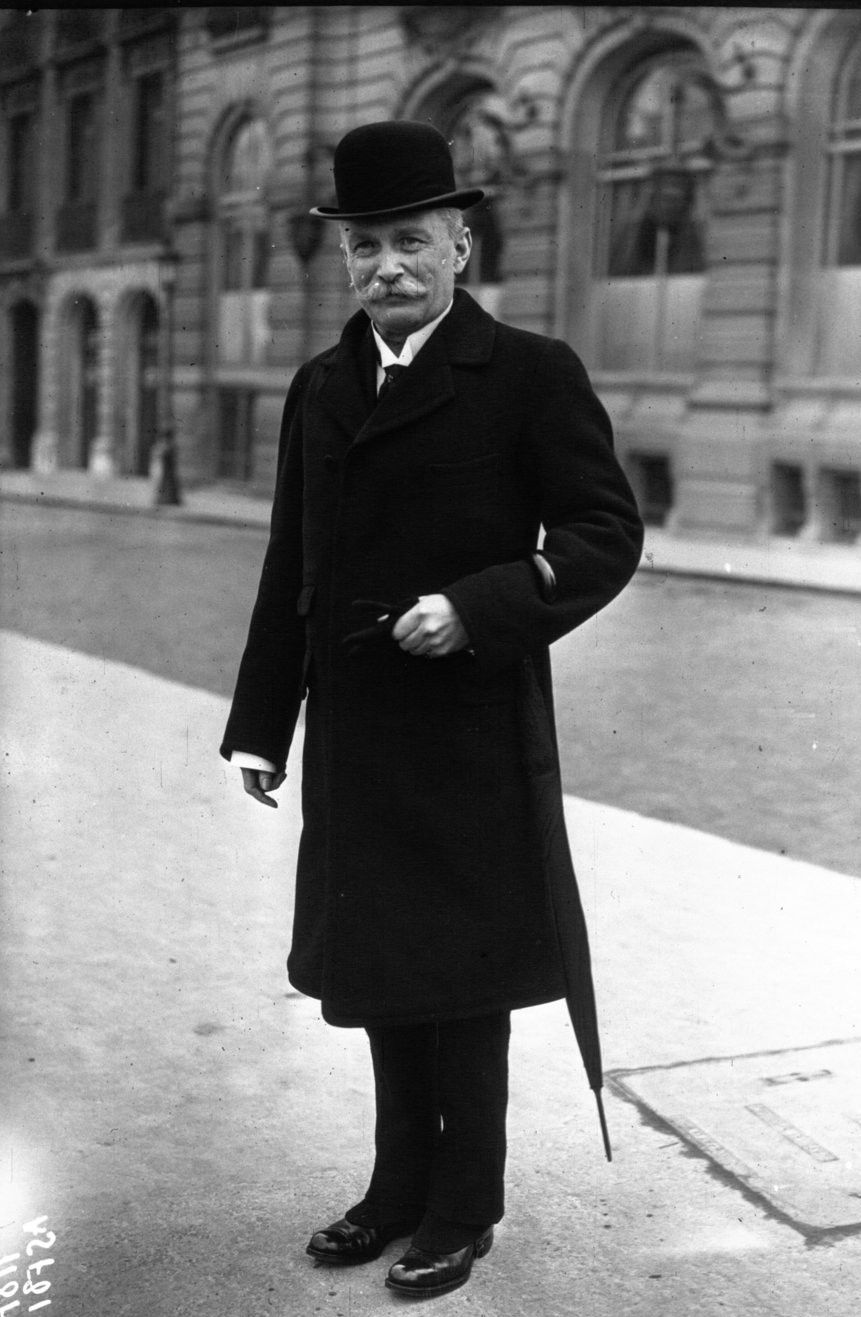

Baron Maurice Jules Marie Emmanuel Eleuthère Houtart (1866–1939) was a Belgian politician.

== Family ==
Maurice was born the son of Baron Jules Houtart (1844–1928). He married Marcelle Jooris (1878–1924), daughter of Emile Jooris, the mayor of Vardenare, with whom he had one son. Descendants through his son are still living. He published a history of his family. From 1934 he lived in the Château de Gesves.

== Career ==
In 1889, having acquired a doctorate in law, he became a lawyer. Later he became active in politics. He was sent to the Hague Conference.

During his political career he was Minister of Finance and Minister of the Colonies, as well as director of the Bank of Brussels.

== Honours ==
- 1932:
  - Minister of State, by royal Decree
  - Knight Grand Cross in the Order of the Crown.
- Commander in the Order of Leopold

== Books ==
- Maurice Houtart, "Généalogie Houtart", in: Annuaire de la noblesse de Belgique, Brussels, 1893.
- Maurice Houtart, Généalogie de la famille Houtart, 1923.
- Maurice Houtart, "Le village de Gesves durant huit siècles, 1000-1800", Annales de la Société archéologique de Namur, 1935.
