= Edouard Mercier =

Belgian politician

Édouard Joseph Mercier
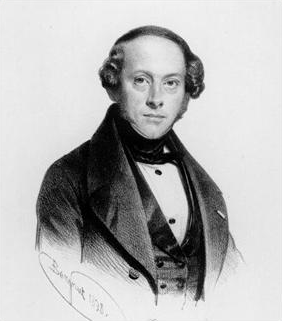
- Born: 1 April 1799
- Died: 18 January 1870 (aged 70)

Édouard Joseph Mercier (1 April 1799 - 18 January 1870) was a Belgian politician of liberal tendencies. He is the uncle of Cardinal Mercier. He served several terms as Minister of Finance; first was 1840–1841, second was 1843–1845; Third term was 1855–1857. He was appointed Minister of State in 1845.

== Biography ==
Mercier was born in the Walloon city of Braine-l'Alleud to register controller Hubert Mercier and Marie-Josèphe François. He married Jeanne Mastraeten.

Mercier had served in the capacities of:

- clerk at the Customs Service (1819);
- inspector of excise duties (1827);
- Inspector of Taxes (1830);
- Chief Inspector of Taxes in the province of Brabant (1831);
- Chief Inspector at the Central Administration (1833-1839);
- Director of the Central Administration of the direct taxation, cadastre, customs and excise (1839-1840).

He had begun a political career. In 1837, he was a liberal (and from 1843 Catholic) member of parliament for the district of Nivelles and held this office until 1857. In 1859 he was again a member of parliament until 1863.

He participated in the Unionist ministry of Peter Decker as Minister of Finance (1855-1857). There is supposed to represent liberal opinion, but his liberalism was very moderate. At the time of the unrest that followed the vote of the "convents of law" (May–June 1857), he argued with Alphonse Nothomb the thesis that we should not give in to pressure from the street. After the local elections of October 1857, which was a defeat for the Catholics, he opposed Nothomb with the resignation of De Decker, but could not prevent it.

== Bibliography ==
- C. HOYAUX-BAILLY, Contribution à l'étude de la vie politique belge. Essai de déterminantion de l'opinion politique d'Edouard Joseph Mercier, représentant de Nivelles et ministre des finances, licentiaatsthesis (onuitgegeven), ULB, 1954.
- Jean-Luc DE PAEPE & Christiane RAINDORF-GERARD, Le Parlement belge, 1831–1894, Brussel, 1996.
- Valmy FEAUX, Histoire politique du Brabant Wallon. Du Duché de Brabant à l'éclosion démocratique (1919), l'Harmattan-Academia, Louvain-la-Neuve, 2014.
