= Robert Henrion =

Belgian fencer

Personal information
- Born: 23 July 1915 Namur, Belgium
- Died: 19 June 1997 (aged 81)

Sport
- Sport: Fencing

Robert Henrion (23 July 1915 – 19 June 1997) was a Belgian politician. He was Minister of Finance from 1966 to 1968, and in 1980. He was also a fencer, and competed in the individual and team épée events at the 1952 Summer Olympics.
