= Robert Vandeputte =

Belgian economist, civil servant and politician

- Born: 26 February 1908; Antwerp, Belgium
- Died: 18 November 1997 (aged 89); Brussels, Belgium
- Occupations: politician, economist, civil servant

Robert Vandeputte (26 February 1908 – 18 November 1997) was a Belgian economist, civil servant, politician, and former governor of the National Bank of Belgium (NBB) from 1971 until 1975. He was Minister of Finance in 1981.

== Sources ==
- Robert Vandeputte
- Robert Vandeputte, Een machteloos minister, Standaard, 1982

Preceded by Hubert Ansiaux	Governor of the National Bank of Belgium; 1971–1975	Succeeded by Cecil de Strycker
