= Émile Buisset =

Belgian politician

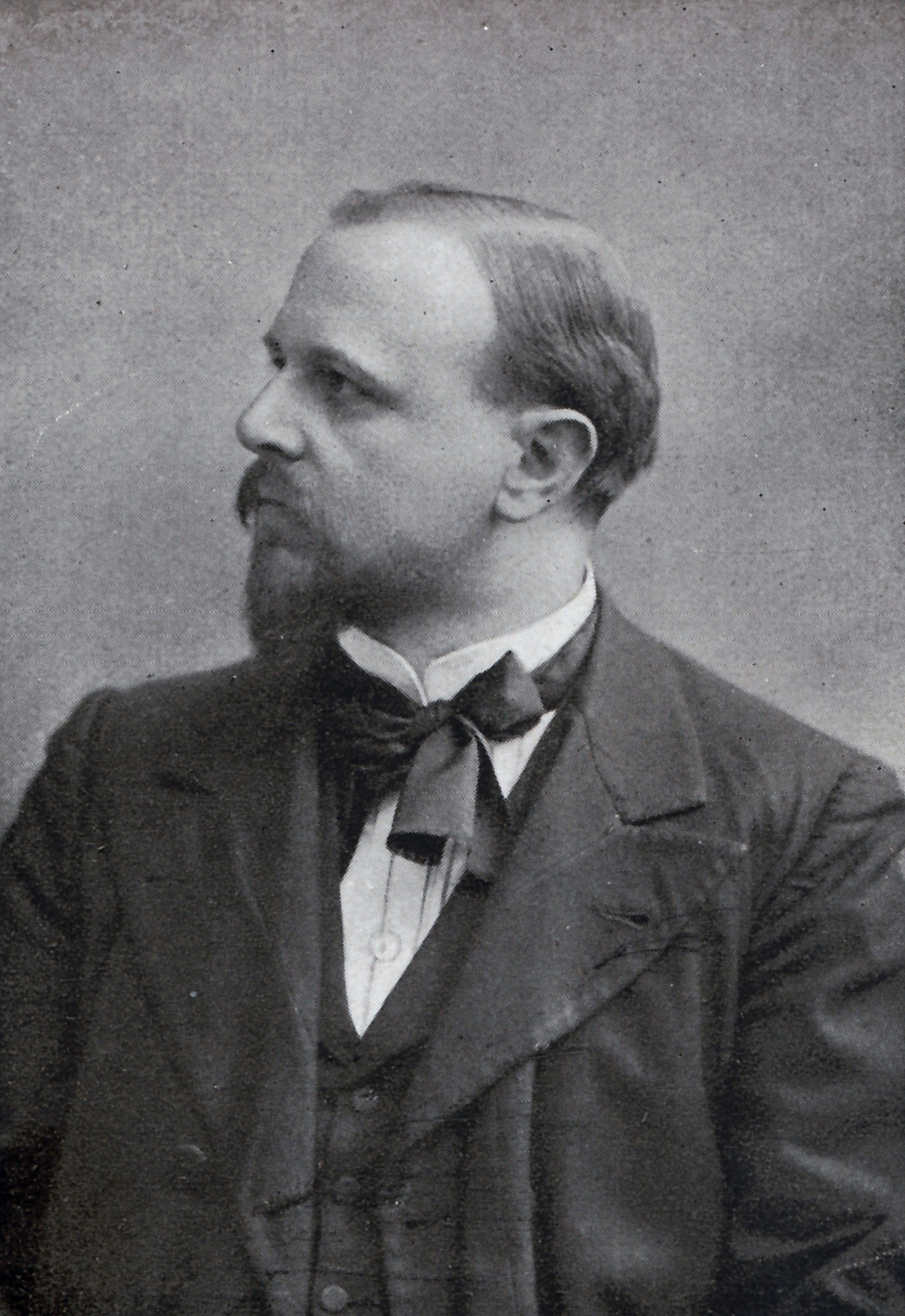
Emile Buisset in 1911.

Émile Buisset (1869–1925) was a Belgian politician.
