= Julien Liebaert =

Belgian Member of Parliament, Senator and minister

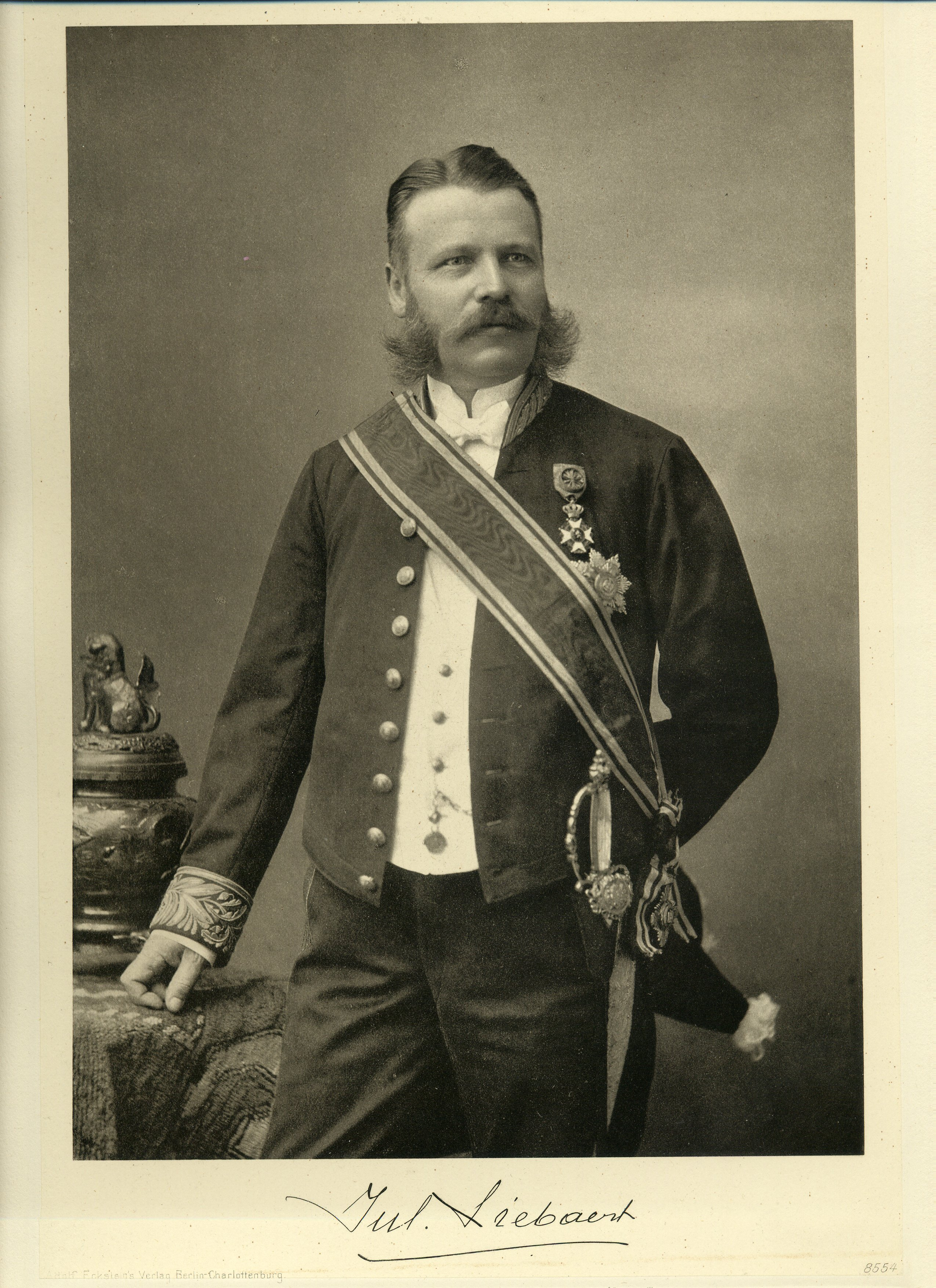

Minister of Belgium

Personal details
- Born: 22 June 1848; Kortrijk, Belgium
- Died: 16 September 1930 (aged 82); Ternat, Belgium
- Political party: Catholic Party

Julien Auguste Marie Joseph, Baron Liebaert (22 June 1848 in Kortrijk – 16 September 1930 in Ternat) was a Belgian Member of Parliament, Senator and Minister for the Catholic Party.

== Biography ==
Liebaert was a son of Auguste and Louise Liebaert Peel. He married Marie Debontridder (1852-1916) in 1874. They had two sons and a daughter. Their daughter married representative and senator Jean Mahieu.

Liebaert obtained a doctorate in law (1870) and doctorate in political and administrative sciences (1871) from the Catholic University of Leuven. He established himself as a lawyer in Brussels and then in Kortrijk.

He was elected member of the provincial council (1877-1890) and deputy (1878-1890) of West Flanders.

In 1890 he was elected deputy for the constituency of Kortrijk and held this office until 1919. He was elected senator in 1919 for the same district, and would sit as a co-opted senator from 1925 to 1929.

Liebaert went through a varied ministerial career for twelve years as:

- Finance Minister (January to August 1899) in the government of Prime Minister Jules Vandenpeereboom
- Minister of Industry and Labour (August 1899 - February 1900) in the government of Paul de Smet de Naeyer
- Minister of Posts, Telegraphs and Railways (August 1899 - May 1907) in the government of Paul de Smet de Naeyer
- Finance Minister (May 1907 - June 1911) in the governments of Jules de Trooz and Frans Schollaert.

In 1912 he was appointed Minister of State and he became director (1912-1926) and governor (1927-1930) of the National Bank of Belgium.

== Honours ==
- Created Baron Liebaert, by Royal Decree of 1930.
- Minister of State, by Royal Decree.
- Grand Cordon in the Order of Leopold.
- Knight Grand Cross in the Order of the Crown
- Knight Grand Cross in the imperial Order of the Double Dragon.
