= Edouard d'Huart =

Belgian politician

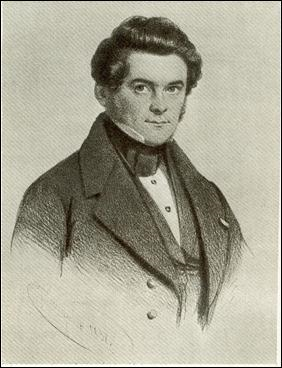

Edouard, Baron d'Huart was a Belgian politician from Luxembourg.

== Personal life ==
Edouard d'Huart belonged to a noble family of mainly soldiers, for whom the first nobility recognition dated from 1613. He was a son of Henri-Eloi d'Huart (1761–1823) and Catherine de Patoul (1761-1838). Henri d'Huart was an officer with a career in Austria, France and Holland. In 1816, he was admitted to the nobility in the Duchy of Luxembourg with the title of baron, transmissible to the eldest son. In 1842, the title was extended to all his descendants. He was married in 1835 to Anne de Montpellier d'Annevoie (1807-1906) and they had four children.

== Career ==
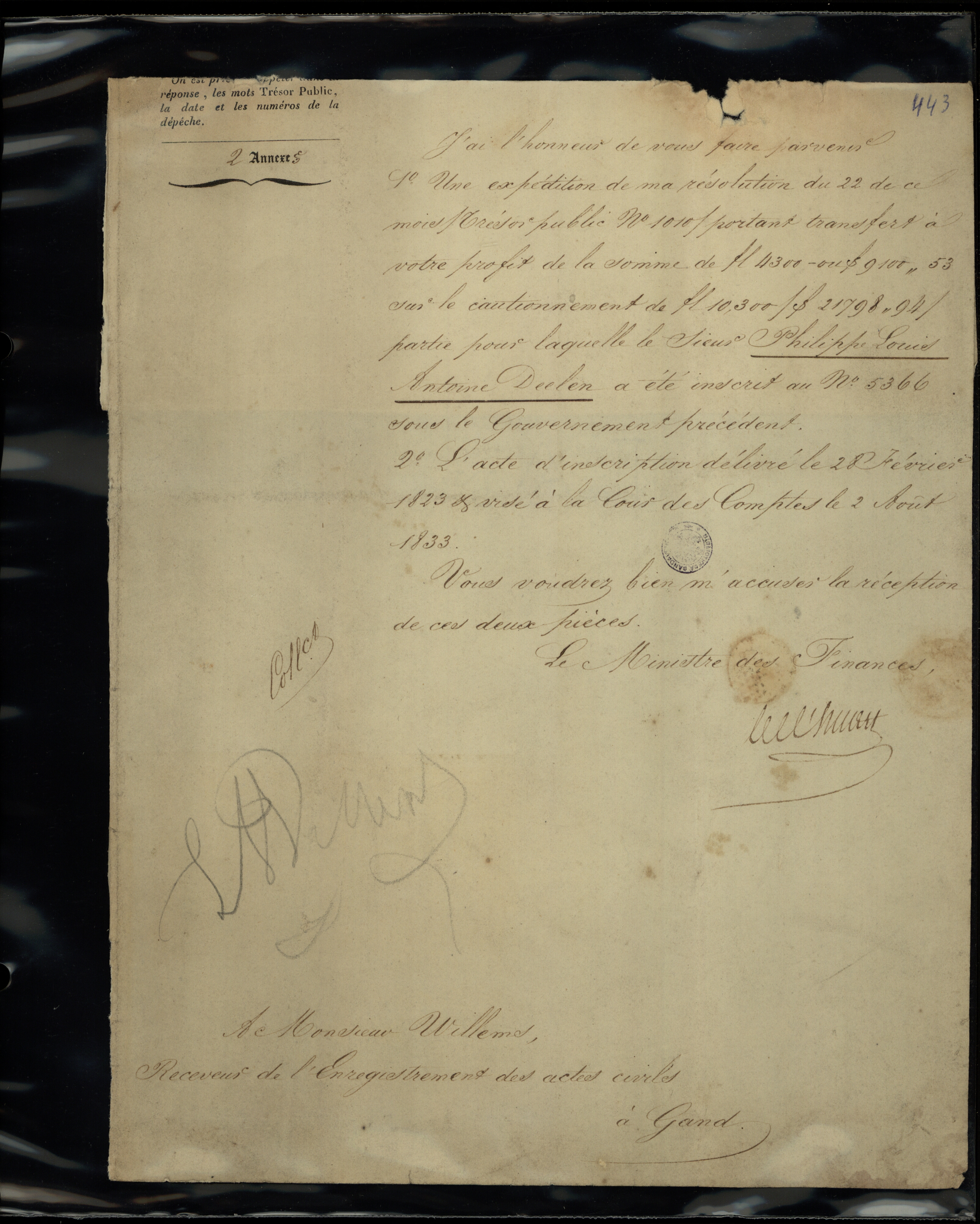
Letter by Édouard d'Huart (1836)

He worked in engineering before moving into politics. Baron Edouard d'Huart (Édouard-Dominique-Joseph-Marie d'Huart) was first member of the Provincial States of the Kingdom of Netherlands. Upon Belgian independence in October 1830, he was elected to the National Congress as part of the Liberal Unionist for the district of Virton and he was also appointed district commissioner of Grevenmacher, where he remained until 1834. From 1831 to 1848 he served as a deputy for the area of Virton in the House of Representatives. From June 1840 to November 1847, he was governor of the province of Namur. In 1875-1880 he was Senator for the town of Dinant.

His unionism made in 1845 he left his liberal kindred spirits and joined the unionist still thinking Catholic party. After years he had left politics, he was elected in 1875 in the Belgian Senate for the District of Dinant. In the Senate, he was from 1875 to 1880, the chairman of the committee Interior. In 1880 he stepped down as senator in favor of his son Alfred d'Huart.

From 1834 to 1839, he was also Minister of Finance in the Government de Theux de Meylandt I. Because he did not agree to give up the implementation of the Treaty of the XXIV Articles, when Belgium Dutch Limburg and the Grand Duchy of Luxembourg, he took dismissal. Then he was from 1840 to 1847 governor of the province of Namur and from 1845 to 1847 Minister without portfolio in the Government Van de Weyer and the Government de Theux de Meylandt II.

== Honours ==
- Grand Officer in the Order of Leopold.
- * Saxe-Coburg and Gotha: Knight Grand Cross in the Saxe-Ernestine House Order.
