= Michel Levie =

Belgian politician

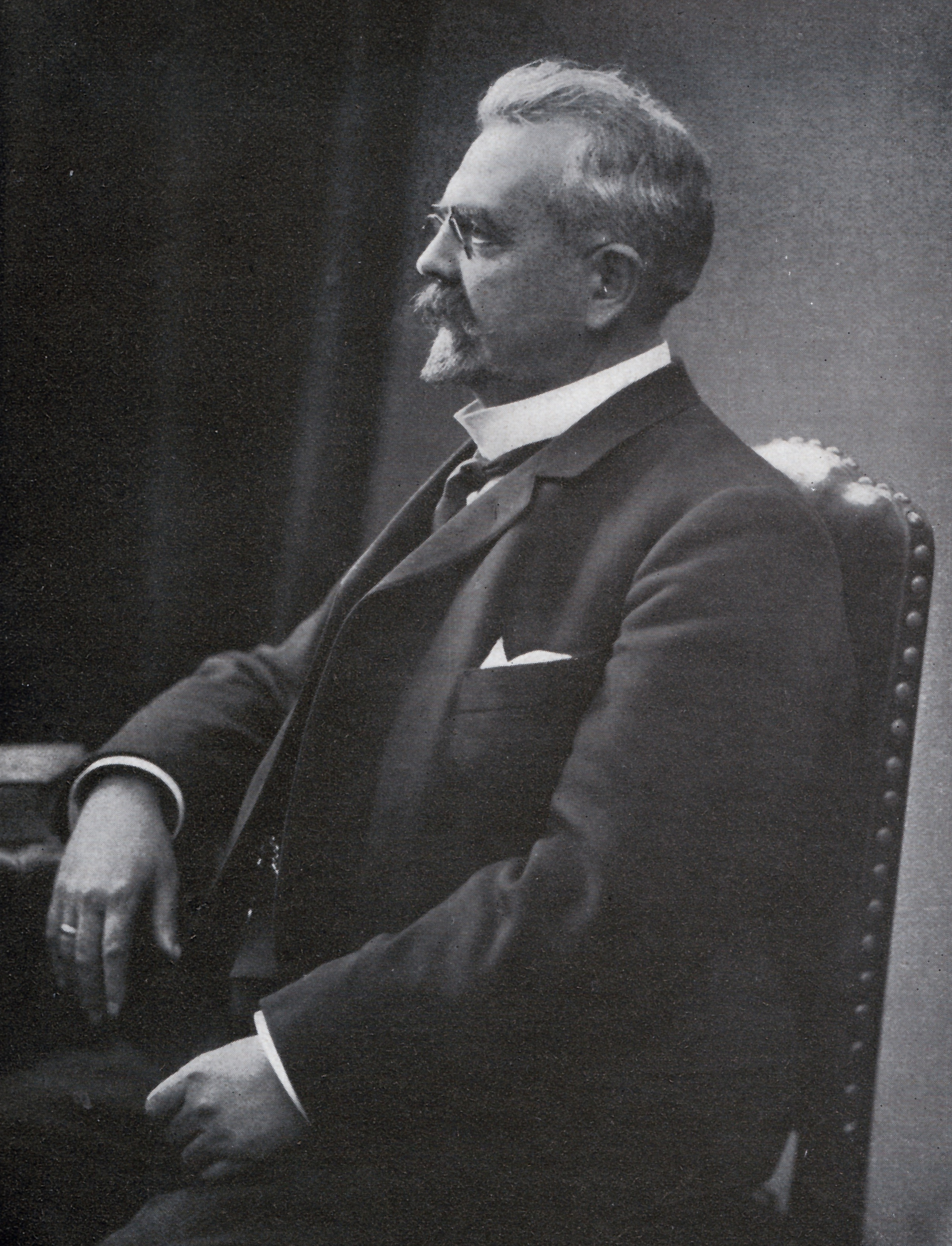
Michel Levie in 1911.

Michel Édouard Levie (Binche, 4 October 1851 – Saint-Josse-ten-Noode, 6 March 1939) was a Belgian politician and member of the Catholic Party. He was a doctor of law, and also practiced as a lawyer.

Levie was a member of the Chamber of Representatives from 1900 until 1921; Minister of Finance between 1911 and 1914. He was made Minister of State on 21 November 1918.

A square (Square Levie-Levieplein) in Schaerbeek, Brussels is named in his honour.
