= Graux, West Virginia =

Graux
- Unincorporated community
- Location within the state of West Virginia Graux (the United States)
- Coordinates: 38°45′17″N 81°17′16″W
- Country: United States
- State: West Virginia
- County: Roane
- Elevation: 837 ft (255 m)
- Time zone: UTC-5 (Eastern (EST))
  - Summer (DST): UTC-4 (EDT)
- GNIS ID: 1740893

Graux is an unincorporated community in Roane County, West Virginia, United States.
