= Henri Liebaert =

Belgian politician

- Born: Henri Marcel Hector Liebaert; 29 November 1895; Deinze, Belgium
- Died: 7 April 1977 (aged 81); Rome, Italy
- Occupation: politician

Henri Marcel Hector Liebaert (29 November 1895 – 7 April 1977) was a Belgian liberal politician and minister. Liebaert was an industrialist and editor of the French-speaking Flemish daily La Flandre Libéral. He was a member of parliament (1955–1958) and senator (1958 -) and President of the Liberal Party (1953–1954). Liebaert was Minister for Economic Affairs (1946–1947) and of Finance (1949–1950 and 1954–1958).

== Sources ==
- Presidents of the Belgian liberal party
