= Renaat Van Elslande =

Belgian politician (1916–2000)

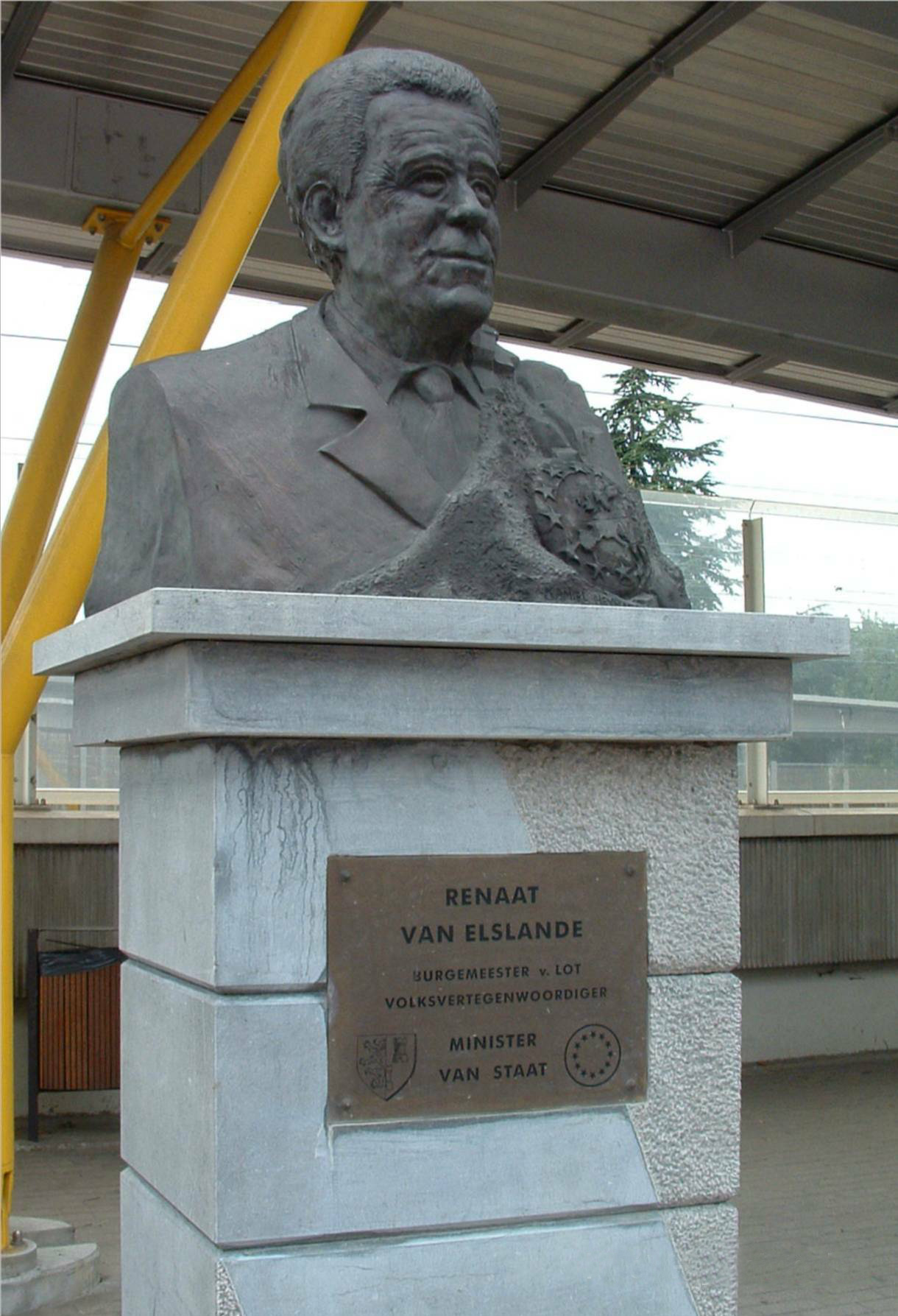
Buste of Renaat Van Elslande, mayor of Lot and Minister of State

Renaat Antoon Joseph Van Elslande (born in Boekhoute on 21 January 1916; died in Uccle on 21 December 2000) was a Christen-Democratisch en Vlaams politician who had been culture minister and foreign minister.

== Honours ==
- War cross
- Minister of State, by royal decree
- Knight Grand Cross in the Order of Leopold II
