= Robert Urbain =

Belgian politician (1930–2018)

Minister of State
- Incumbent
- Assumed office 1998

Member of the Chamber of Representatives (Belgium)
- In office 1971–1995

Senator
- In office 1995–1999

Mayor of Boussu
- In office 1977–2006

Belgian Commissioner General for Expo 2010
- In office 2006–2009

Personal details
- Born: November 24, 1930 Belgium
- Died: November 9, 2018 (aged 87)
- Occupation: Politician, teacher

Robert Urbain (24 November 1930 – 9 November 2018) was a Belgian politician who served as Minister of State from 1998.

== Career ==
A certified teacher of secondary education in mathematics and physics, Robert Urbain began his professional career in 1950 as a mathematics teacher in École normale (Normal school) in Mons. In 1958, he joined the provincial administration of Hainaut, where he held various positions until 1971, the year he was elected deputy for the Mons constituency. He held this mandate until 1995, and then served as an elected senator from 1995 to 1999. At the local level, he was mayor of Boussu from 1977 to 2006.

In June 2006, he was appointed Belgian Commissioner General for the 2010 World Expo in Shanghai. In August 2009, he resigned from this position in a tense atmosphere, just as the cornerstone for the Belgian pavilion was about to be laid, and was replaced by his deputy, Leo Delcroix.

In February 2011, in the context of the Arab revolutions in Tunisia, Egypt, and Libya, controversy resurfaced in the press regarding alleged ties between Colonel Gaddafi and the politician from Borinage.
