= Charles Graux (politician) =

Belgian politician (1837–1910)

Charles A. L. Graux
- Born: Charles Alexandre Louis Graux; 4 January 1837; Brussels, Belgium
- Died: 22 January 1910 (aged 73); Elsene, Belgium
- Occupation(s): politician, lawyer, professor

Signature
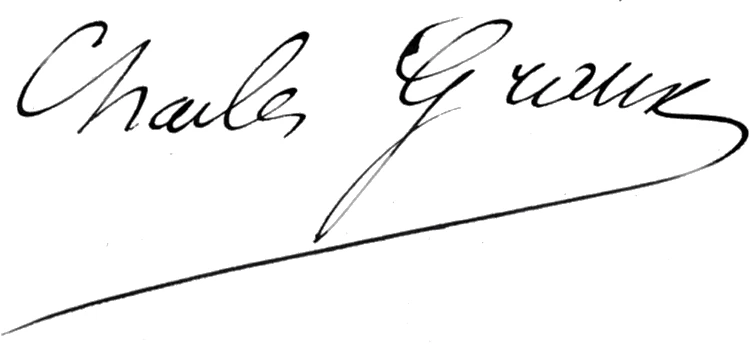

Charles Alexandre Louis Graux (4 January 1837 – 22 January 1910) was a Belgian lawyer, professor at the Universite Libre de Bruxelles, and a liberal politician.

He co-founded La Liberté and the Ligue de l'Enseignement, and was the director of La Discussion.

He was Belgium's Minister of Finance from 1879 to 1884. He was a member of Belgium's Chamber of Representatives from 1890 to 1894. He was made a Minister of State in 1900.

== See also ==
- Liberal Party

== Sources ==
- Liberal Archive
