= Auguste Duvivier =

Belgian politician (1772–1846)

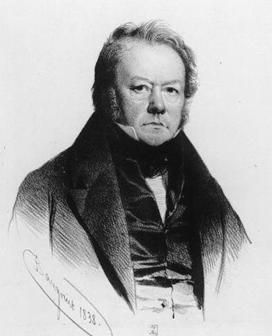

Auguste Joseph Duvivier (12 December 1772 – 1 July 1846) was a Belgian liberal politician and Minister of Finance.

== Biography ==
Duvivier was born in Mons on 12 December 1772. He had two brothers, Vincent Duvivier and Ignace Louis Duvivier, who also served in the military.

Auguste Duvivier studied medicine and graduated from the University of Leuven. He then pursued a specialization in Paris. He did not fully practice medicine, but was professor of natural history at the Central School of Jemmape in 1798.

He then made a career in administration under the Empire and the United Kingdom of the Netherlands.
