= Gaston Geens =

Belgian politician (1931–2002)

Minister-President of Flanders
- In office 22 December 1981 – 21 January 1992
- Preceded by: Position established
- Succeeded by: Luc Van den Brande

Personal details
- Born: 10 June 1931 Melen, Belgium
- Died: 5 June 2002 (aged 70) Winksele, Belgium
- Party: Christian Democratic and Flemish
- Education: Catholic University of Leuven

Gaston C. S. A. Geens (10 June 1931 – 5 June 2002) was a Belgian politician and minister-president of Flanders.

Geens received a Master in Law from the Katholieke Universiteit Leuven as well as a licentiate of economy.

In 1961 Geens, together with Frank Swaelen and Leo Tindemans, was part of a think tank of the CVP. In 1972 he became a member of the party leadership. Geens was elected a member of the city council of Winksele in 1970. After Winksele's fusion with Herent in 1976 he became a member of that city council.

In 1974 in a government led by Tindemans, Geens became Secretary of State for the Budget and Science. In 1976 he was promoted to minister but with the same competences. He became Minister of Finance in the second Tindemans cabinet, but this coalition fell over the Egmont pact. He remained Minister of Finance under Paul Vanden Boeynants and in the first two coalitions led by Wilfried Martens. During the third government led by Martens he again became minister of the budget. During Martens IV, Geens became minister-president of the Flemish Executive which he led until 1992.

Geens gave Flanders a new economical identity, by taking the initiative for the Derde Industriële Revolutie in Vlaanderen (Third industrial revolution in Flanders), Flanders Technology and the Flemish Aerospace Group (FLAG).

Gaston Geens was seventy when he died at home due to cardiac arrest. On 30 May 2009, a statue of Geens was unveiled in Aarschot by Herman Van Rompuy.

Political offices
New office	Minister-President of Flanders; 1981–1992	Succeeded by Luc Van den Brande
