= Philippe Maystadt =

Belgian politician

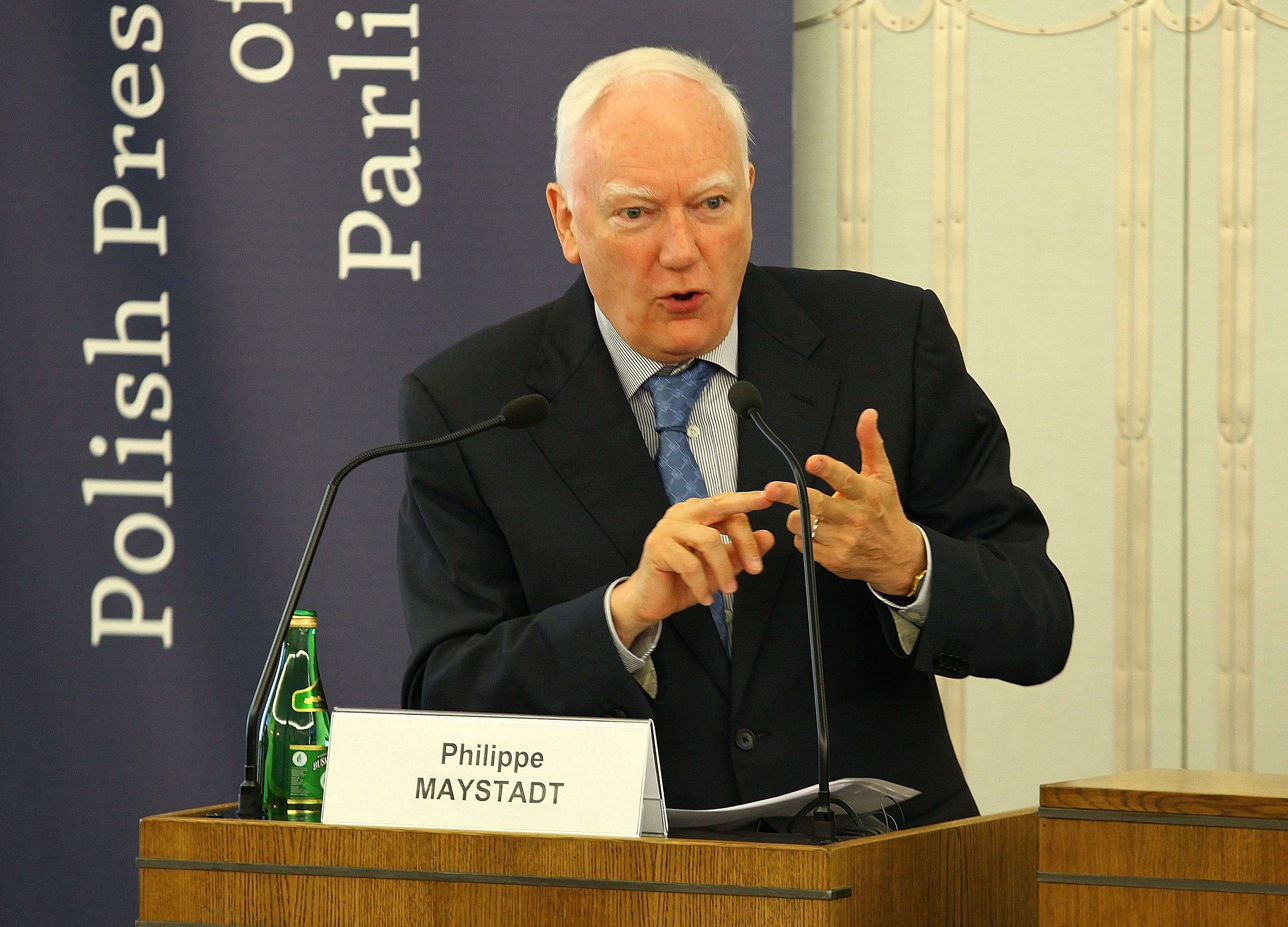
- Maystadt in 2011

Personal details
- Born: Philippe M.P.J. Maystadt; 14 March 1948 Petit-Rechain, Belgium
- Died: 7 December 2017 (aged 69)
- Party: Humanist Democratic Centre
- Education: Catholic University of Leuven; Claremont Graduate University

Philippe M.P.J. Maystadt (14 March 1948 – 7 December 2017) was a Belgian politician who served as Minister for Economic Affairs, Minister of Finance, and Deputy Prime Minister. He was President of the European Investment Bank (EIB) from 2000 to 2011.

== Personal life and studies ==
Philippe Maystadt was born in Verviers (Belgium) in 1948. He obtained a PhD in law at the Catholic University of Louvain and gained a Master of Arts in public administration at Claremont Graduate School, Los Angeles, USA. He was a part-time professor at the Law Faculty of the Catholic University of Louvain. Maystadt died on 7 December 2017 aged 69.

== Career ==
Maystadt started his career as an assistant professor at the Catholic University of Louvain in Belgium. In 1977, he became a Member of the House of Representatives and was appointed Secretary of State for the Walloon Region in 1979. Between 1980 and 1988 he was successively Minister for the Civil Service and Scientific Policy, Minister for Budgetary Affairs, Scientific Policy and Planning and Minister for Economic Affairs. From 1988 to 1998, he served as Minister of Finance and was awarded, in 1990, the title "Finance Minister of the Year" by Euromoney magazine. Philippe Maystadt served twice as Deputy Prime Minister (1986–1988 and 1995–1998). Maystadt has chaired meetings of the G-10 Ministers of Finance, the EU Council of Ministers for Economic and Financial Affairs, the Board of Governors of the EBRD and, for an exceptionally long term of five years, the Interim Committee of the International Monetary Fund. Maystadt's mandate as President of the EIB was renewed in 2006 for a period of six years.

His other past and present appointments include:

- Governor of European Bank for Reconstruction and Development (EBRD)
- Professor at Université catholique de Louvain (Louvain-la-Neuve) (since 1989)
- Belgian Minister of Finance (1988–1998)
- Minister for Economic Affairs (1985–1988)
- Minister for the Budget, Scientific Policy and Planning (1981–1985)

He supervised the entrance of Belgium in the Euro zone.

Seeking election as the President of the Christian Social Party, Maystadt's resignation as Deputy Prime Minister, Minister of Finance and Minister of Foreign Trade was announced on 19 June 1998.

During his last term as Minister of Finance, Maystadt came under heavy criticism after it was revealed that under his responsibility the Belgian State had lost up to 571 million euros in high-risk speculative investments. This affair marked the end of his political career in Belgium.

Maystadt unexpectedly died on 7 December 2017 from a respiratory disease.

== Honours ==
=== Foreign honours ===
- Italy: Grand Cross of the Order of Merit of the Italian Republic (20 February 1986)

Civic offices
Preceded by Brian Unwin	President of the European Investment Bank; 2001–2011	Succeeded by Werner Hoyer
