= Henri Story =

Belgian businessman and liberal politician

- Born: Henri Albert Oscar Lucien Marie Ghislain Story; 27 November 1897; Ghent, Belgium
- Died: 5 December 1944 (aged 47); Gross-Rosen, Belgium
- Occupations: politician, businessman

Henri Albert Oscar Lucien Marie Ghislain Story (27 November 1897 – 5 December 1944) was a Belgian businessman and liberal politician in Ghent. He was born on 27 November 1897, in a prominent liberal family of textile business people. The Story family was connected with other families such as Mechelynck and Rosseel. Henri himself married Cecile Boddaert, a cousin of the President of the Ghent Liberal Association Henri Boddaert. He died in the Gross-Rosen concentration camp.

== Early life ==
His mother died when Henri Story was one year old and five years later his father also died. Together with his three sisters he was raised by his grandmother, Marie Voortman. He attended the Institut de Gand but early during World War I, from 1915 until 1918, he served in the war, and in 1918, he served in the occupational force in Germany. After his return to Belgium, he started working in the family business in and served in several mandates in companies such as the Financière Industrielle Belge, de NV Louisiane, de Union Cotonnière, Brufina en de Banque de Bruxelles. He became director-general of the Filature Renson and treasurer of the Ghent Chamber of Commerce.

== Political career ==
In the twenties his political career started and he followed in the footsteps of its father and grandfather. Both served in important functions within the liberal association and were prominent people within the progressive wing of the party. His grandfather Henri Abraham conducted opposition within the Liberal Party against the doctrinary Charles de Kerchove de Denterghem. His father Albert, a close collaborator of burgomaster Lippens, had been involved actively with the Société libérale pour l’Etude des Sciences et des Oeuvres Sociales and of the Gentsche Volkskeuken (E: Ghent People Kitchen). Both were also members of the Council of management and of the redaction of the Ghent journal Flandre Libérale (where Henri would succeed them).

Henri emphasized the same political ideas as his father and grandfather. He became a convinced Social Liberal, who endorsed the emancipatory roots of traditional liberalism and dreamt of a broad People's Party which included all layers of the population. He himself was a follower of Albert Mechelynck who in the 1920s, as national President of the Liberal party brought the heart of the party to the streets and districts, away from the private salons and elitist clubs. In 1926, Henri became a member of the party office of the Liberal Association of Ghent, and immediately became a delegate for the arrondissement to the national Council of the Liberal Party.

In 1928, he became a member of the provincial Council of East Flanders, and was re-elected in 1932, but in 1936, he declared himself no longer eligible. In the same year he became President of the Liberal Association of Ghent where he succeeded Jean Van Impe. The Ghent association at that moment was severely divided and many saw in Henri Story, who was a relative newcomer, a new force which could renew and restructure the party and ensure its unity. The members of his first governing board made things more clearly: all sections of the liberals of Ghent were given a voice. Armand Colle joined the governing committee as a representative of the trade union, Carlos Flamant for the Volksbond Vrijheidsliefde, others from the Liberale Voorwacht and Help U Zelf (E: Help Yourself). Several representatives of the different district departments also got a seat. He also introduced Dutch as the language of the party governing board. The Story family belonged, just as the major part of the Ghent party leaders], to the French-speaking bourgeoisie. Story's ideas for democratisation and his striving towards a people party required the acceptance of Flemish as an equivalent language to French. Liberalism was, for Henri, the key to more prosperity and freedom for the entire population, and therefore it was obvious that the language of the majority of the people must prevail. The new party booklet, which was published in 1937, Op Nieuwe Wegen (E: On New Roads), would be written in Dutch. In this he followed the vision of his own father, who between 1880 and 1890 had been an active member of the Vlaamsche Liberale Kiesbond (E: Flemish Liberal Voters League).

Henri Story redefined the working of the Ghent department of the Liberal Party. Between 1936 and 1940, the political, social and economic positions of the liberal party were being redefined. He emphasized the strict independence of magistrates, the protection of minorities by means of a representation in the parliament, the rights and the equivalence of women or the combination of a tempered free market economy with social security for everyone. He pleaded for the establishment of a State Council which protected the citizen against abuses by the state, the abolition of the provincial senators, a simplification of the tax system and a new financing scheme for the municipalities.

In 1938, he was elected as Municipality Council member and became Alderman for the large urban public enterprises, which he managed as a professional manager. Due to the threat of war, he did not get much time to roll out his plans. The increasing threat of war in Europe leads to a range activities which have to do with protection of the people of Ghent, such as supplies and support to the families of the mobilised. Story, who as an Alderman was also responsible for the so-called passive maintaining of the city, was closely involved in the prewar preparations. During the first months of 1940, representatives of the political parties, the industry, the social organisations and the university met on a regular base under his chairmanship to prepare Ghent for a possible war. At the outbreak of World War II, burgomaster Vander Stegen flees to France but Story stayed in Ghent as head of civil protection, he was drafted 16 May, and has to join his regiment. He reached his regiment just after the capitulation of the Belgian army and returns to Ghent. He was reinstated as Alderman, but did not succeed to resume his office. In 1941, the war burgomaster Elias dismissed him from office.

== World War II ==
He returned to his business and became more active than ever. He continued to serve his mandates in several enterprises, and became a director of the Bank van Brussel on the Kouter in Ghent and became chairman of the Intifil cooperative and attempted to navigate the textile industry of Ghent through the war. At the surface he behaved as a strictly neutral citizen, but from the start of the Nazi occupation he committed himself to help the prisoners of war, the deportees and the people forced to work in Germany. He refuses to pass on the lists of his employees to the Nazis, what brings him in 1942, for the Court martial. His commitment to resisting the occupation goes even further. Already in 1940, he joins the local resistance. He founded the Ghent department of the information service Zero and is provincial agent for the Socrates group which supports people hiding from the Nazis and organised flight routes. He helped his future son-in-law, Charles Waegemans, to escape to London. Through Albert Maertens he became involved in the distribution of underground newspapers such as The Belfort and at the activities of the Onafhankelijkheidsfront (E: Independence Front). His contacts in the financial and industrial world and his leading position within freemasonry (as chairing master of Le Septentrion) also meant an important support for the resistance movement.

Also in the policy domain he continued his work in the underground. Against the German prohibition on political activities, the liberal party shortly after the outbreak of World War II started to make plans for a blueprint for a new post-war liberal party. As from 1941, Henri played an increasingly important role in the preparations. Under supervision of wartime Presidents Jane Brigode and Fernand Demets and with a whole range of post-war Liberal leaders such as Van Glabbeke, Mundeleer and Buisseret, they reflected on a modernised liberal party and in the texts which were prepared, one can clearly see the ideas which Henri stood for and had implemented in Ghent. The new party program for the Liberal Party which was presented by Roger Motz in 1945–1946, was clearly inspired by Henri Story.

His work for the underground resistance during the war would lead to his capture and death. On 22 October 1943, he was arrested in his office at the Kouter in Ghent. He became a member of the Masonic Lodge Liberté chérie (French: "Cherished Liberty") inside Hut 6 of Emslandlager VII (Esterwegen). Attempts to get him released failed and in March 1944 he was transported to Germany. Henri Story died in the Nazi concentration camp of Gross-Rosen near Breslau on 5 December 1944.

== Remembrance ==
He is remembered in Ghent by the playground Henri Story, the foundation Henri Story, the Henri Story Circle and the Textile school Henri Story.

== Sources ==
- Lehoucq, Nicole en Valcke, Tony, in : De fonteinen van de Oranjeberg, Politiek-institutionele geschiedenis van de provincie Oost-Vlaanderen van 1830 tot nu. Deel 2 : Biografisch repertorium, Gent, Stichting Mens en Cultuur, 1997, p. 337-338.
- Henry Story (1897–1944). Inventaris van het archief (1937–1944), Gent, Liberaal Archief, 2005, 21 p. (Inventaris nr. 6)
- Henri Story (Dutch)
