= 1908 Belgian general election =

| ← 1906 | 24 May 1908 | 1910 → |

81 of the 166 seats in the Chamber of Representatives 43 of 80 seats in the Senate
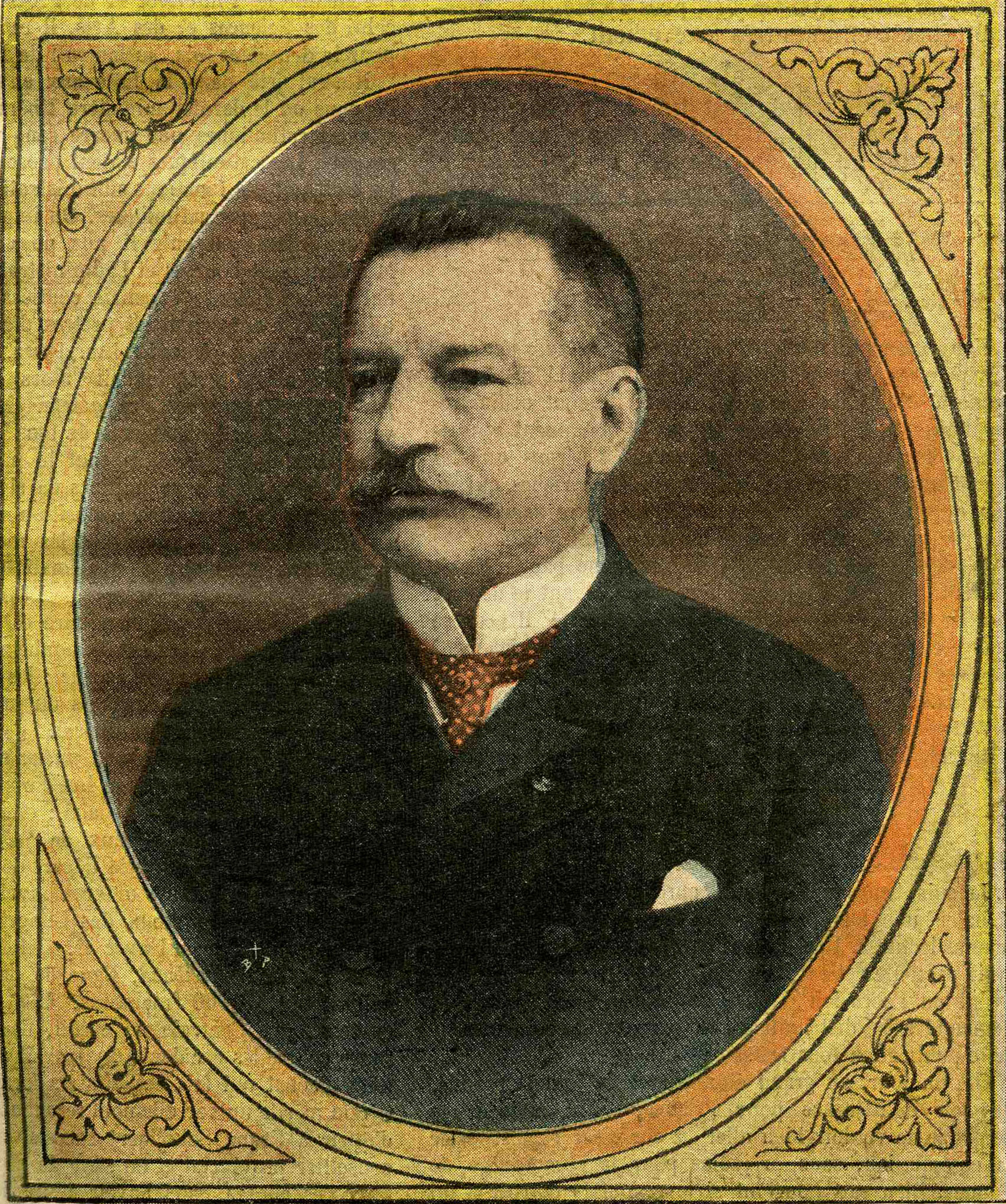

| | First party | Second party |
|---|---|---|
| Leader | Frans Schollaert |
| Party | Catholic | Liberal |
| Seats won | 37 | 15 |
| Popular vote | 517,679 | 331,981 |
| Percentage | 43.11% | 27.64% |
| | Third party | Fourth party |
| Leader | Georges Maes | N/A |
| Party | Labour | Liberal–Socialist |
| Seats won | 19 | 3 |
| Popular vote | 271,870 | 40,068 |
| Percentage | 22.64% | 3.34% |
Government before election
Schollaert
Catholic
Government after election
Schollaert
Catholic

Partial general elections were held in Belgium on 24 May 1908. The result was a victory for the Catholic Party, which won 37 of the 82 seats in the Chamber of Representatives. The François Schollaert government remained in office.

Under the alternating system, elections were only held in four out of the nine provinces: Hainaut, Limburg, Liège and East Flanders.

== Results ==
=== Chamber ===
| Party | Votes | % | Seats |
| Party | Votes | % | Won |
|---|---|---|---|
| Catholic Party | 517,679 | 43.10 | 37 |
| Liberal Party | 331,981 | 27.64 | 21 |
| Belgian Labour Party | 271,870 | 22.64 | 19 |
| Liberal–Socialist kartels | 40,068 | 3.34 | 3 |
| Christene Volkspartij | 25,167 | 2.10 | 1 |
| Catholic dissidents | 6,879 | 0.57 | 0 |
| Merchants | 1,094 | 0.09 | 0 |
| Socialist dissidents | 913 | 0.08 | 0 |
| Other parties | 2,534 | 0.21 | 0 |
| Independents | 2,821 | 0.23 | 0 |
| Total | 1,201,006 | 100.00 | 81 |
| Valid votes | 1,201,006 | 96.88 | |
| Invalid/blank votes | 38,725 | 3.12 | |
| Total votes | 1,239,731 | 100.00 | |
Source: Belgian Elections

=== Senate ===
| Party | Votes | % | Seats |
|---|---|---|---|
| Catholic Party | 492,211 | 46.48 | 21 |
| Liberal Party | 308,282 | 29.11 | 11 |
| Belgian Labour Party | 258,445 | 24.41 | 8 |
| Total | 1,058,938 | 100.00 | 40 |
| Valid votes | 1,058,938 | 95.20 | |
| Invalid/blank votes | 53,360 | 4.80 | |
| Total votes | 1,112,298 | 100.00 | |
Source: Belgian Elections
