= 1904 Belgian general election =

← 1902	29 May 1904	1906 →

81 of the 166 seats in the Chamber of Representatives 43 of 87 seats in the Senate
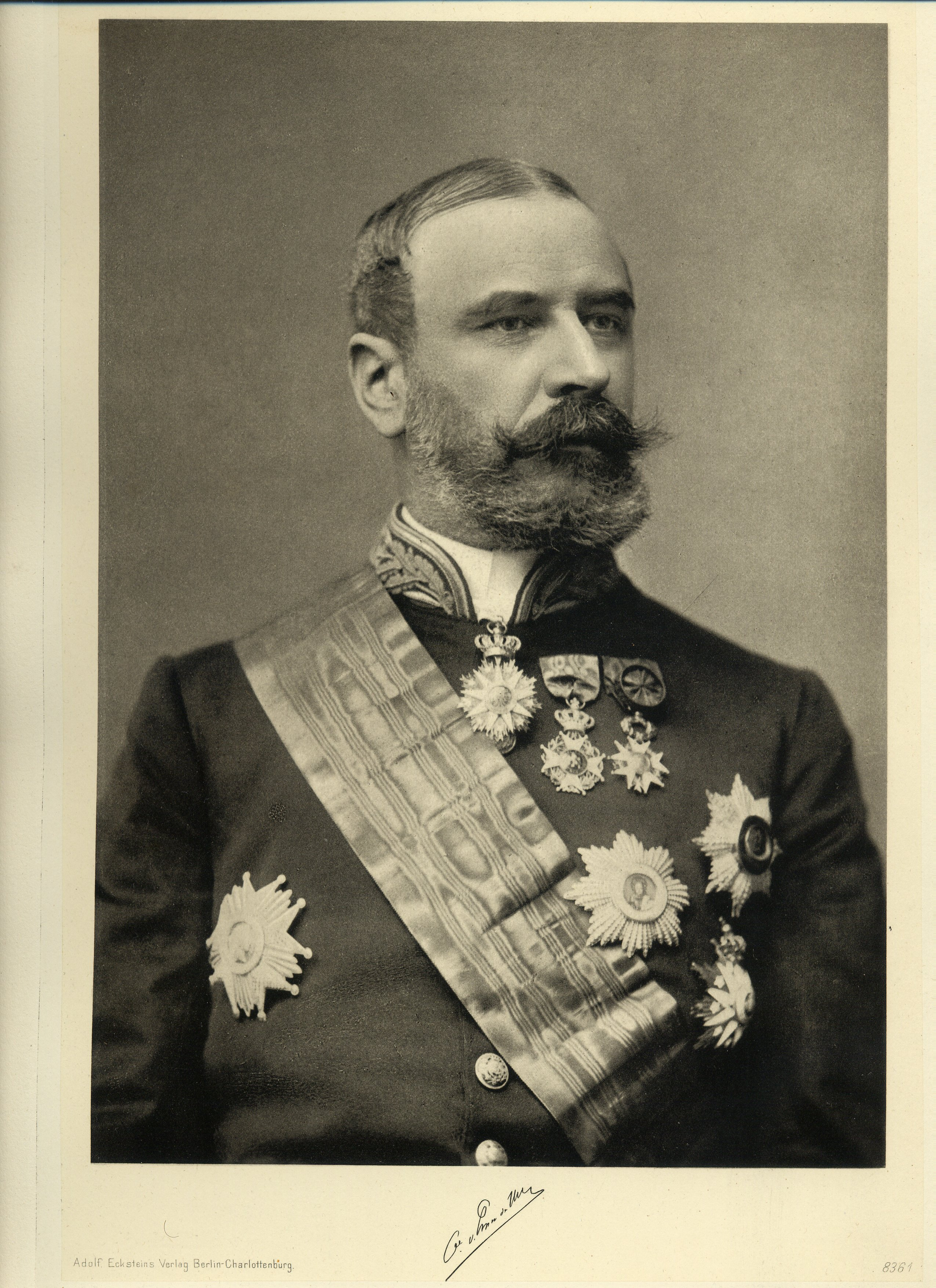

	First party	Second party	Third party
Leader	Paul de Smet de Naeyer		Georges Maes
Party	Catholic	Liberal	Labour
Seats won	38	22	19
Popular vote	486,643	283,411	297,847
Percentage	43.53%	25.35%	26.64%
Government before election
de Smet de Naeyer II
Catholic
Government after election
de Smet de Naeyer II
Catholic

Partial general elections were held in Belgium on 29 May 1904. The result was a victory for the Catholic Party, which won 38 of the 81 seats in the Chamber of Representatives.

Under the alternating system, Chamber elections were only held in the provinces of Hainaut, Limburg, Liège and East Flanders and Senate elections were only held in the remaining five provinces, being Antwerp, Brabant, Luxembourg, Namur and West Flanders.

The main issue in the election was "the hostility of the Liberals to the growth of clerical influence, particularly in educational and political affairs."

== Results ==
=== Chamber ===
Party	Votes	%	Seats
Party	Votes	%	Won
Catholic Party	486,643	43.53	38
Belgian Labour Party	297,847	26.64	19
Liberal Party	283,411	25.35	22
Catholic Dissidents	17,391	1.56	1
Christene Volkspartij	20,761	1.86	1
Socialist dissidents	5,449	0.49	0
Agricultural Federation	3,254	0.29	0
Independents	3,184	0.28	0
Total	1,117,940	100.00	81
Source: Belgian Elections

=== Senate ===
Party	Votes	%	Seats	
Party	Votes	%	Won	Total
Catholic Party	511,745	55.54	25	37
Liberal Party	352,028	38.21	16	39
Belgian Labour Party	37,570	4.08	1	5
National Independents	19,991	2.17	1	1
Radical Party			0	4
Social Radical Party			0	1
Total	921,334	100.00	43	87
Source: Belgian Elections
