= 1902 Belgian general election =

← 1900	25 May 1902	1904 →

85 of the 162 seats in the Chamber of Representatives
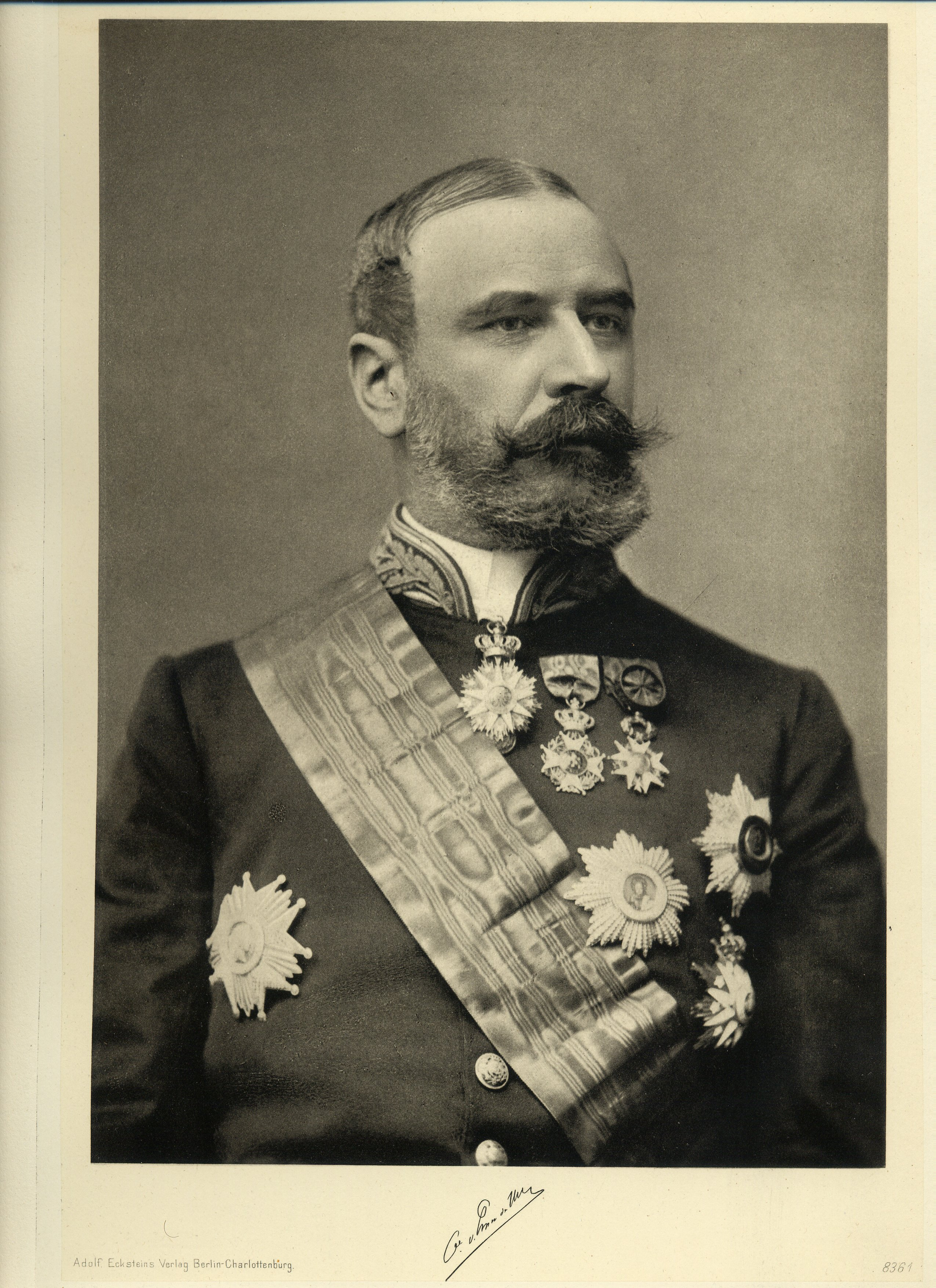

	First party	Second party	Third party
Leader	Paul de Smet de Naeyer		August De Winne
Party	Catholic	Liberal	Labour
Seats won	54	20	10
Popular vote	596,382	266,891	159,370
Percentage	56.00%	25.06%	14.97%
Government before election
de Smet de Naeyer II
Catholic
Government after election
de Smet de Naeyer II
Catholic

Partial general elections were held in Belgium on 25 May 1902. The result was a victory for the Catholic Party, which won 54 of the 85 seats up for election in the Chamber of Representatives. Voter turnout was 95.7%.

Under the alternating system, elections were only held in five out of the nine provinces: Antwerp, Brabant, Luxembourg, Namur and West Flanders. In addition to the regular elections for these 85 seats, elections were held for one seat (6 in total) in Ghent-Eeklo, Aalst, Soignies, Charleroi, Liège and Verviers because the number of representatives increased for these electoral arrondissements following the population census.

A month earlier, a general strike was held, aimed at forcing electoral reform and notably the end of the system of plural voting. However, it was unsuccessful. The Catholic Party, being against reform, even strengthened its majority in the elections.

== Results ==
Party	Votes	%	Seats
Party	Votes	%	Won
Catholic Party	596,382	56.00	54
Liberal Party	266,891	25.06	20
Belgian Labour Party	159,370	14.97	10
Christene Volkspartij	26,435	2.48	1
Merchants	6,027	0.57	0
Independents	9,821	0.92	0
Total	1,064,926	100.00	85
Source: Belgian Elections

== Constituencies ==
The distribution of seats among the electoral districts was as follows. Several arrondissements got one or more additional seats, following the population census.

Province	Arrondissement(s)	Seats	Change
Antwerp	Antwerp	13	+2
Antwerp	Mechelen	4	–
Antwerp	Turnhout	3	–
Limburg	Hasselt	3	–
Limburg	Tongeren-Maaseik	3	–
East Flanders	Aalst	5	+1
East Flanders	Oudenaarde	3	–
East Flanders	Gent-Eeklo	11	+1
East Flanders	Dendermonde	3	–
East Flanders	Sint-Niklaas	4	–
West Flanders	Bruges	4	+1
West Flanders	Roeselare-Tielt	4	–
West Flanders	Kortrijk	5	+1
West Flanders	Ypres	3	–
West Flanders	Veurne-Diksmuide-Ostend	4	–
Brabant	Leuven	6	–
Brabant	Brussels	21	+3
Brabant	Nivelles	4	–
Hainaut	Tournai-Ath	6	–
Hainaut	Charleroi	9	+1
Hainaut	Thuin	3	–
Hainaut	Mons	6	–
Hainaut	Soignies	3	+1
Liège	Huy-Waremme	4	–
Liège	Liège	12	+1
Liège	Verviers	5	+1
Luxembourg	Arlon-Marche-Bastogne	3	–
Luxembourg	Neufchâteau-Virton	2	–
Namur	Namur	5	–
Namur	Dinant-Philippeville	4	–
Total		166	+14
