= Progressive Party (Belgium) =

Defunct political party in Belgium

Progressive Party Progressieve Partij Parti Progressiste
- President: Paul Janson
- Founder: 1887
- Dissolved: 1900
- Split from: Liberal Party
- Merged into: Liberal Party
- Ideology: Progressivism; Social liberalism

The Progressive Party of Belgium (French: Parti Progressiste; Dutch: Progressieve Partij) was a progressive liberal party which existed from 1887 until 1900.

== History ==
The Belgian Liberal party in the 1860s and 1870s had a strong progressive wing in the cities, which in the 1870s even dominated Belgian liberalism. After the defeat of the Liberal party in the general elections of 1884 the doctrinarian-bourgeois faction continued to dominate the Belgian Liberal party. However, the progressistes or radicals no longer wanted to toe the line. In 1887 they established their own party, the Parti Progressiste, with Paul Janson as its president. Although the radicals shared some ideas with the socialist Parti Ouvrier Belge (POB), they rejected universal suffrage.

Over the years, it became more radical in its views and in 1894, they asked for the creation of a Ministry of Labour, the creation of maximum hours for a working day, and compulsory insurance against accidents, disease, unemployment and disability. More important still, it envisaged the creation of a true public sector by the nationalization of the railroads, canals, roads, bridges and coal mines and by the replacement of the national bank by a bank of state, etc. They reunited with the Liberal Party in 1900, which made many concessions to the radicals.

== See also ==
- Politics of Belgium
- Liberalism in Belgium
- Liberal Archive
- Belgian Labour Party (BWP/POB)
- Christene Volkspartij

== Sources ==
- In de oppositie (1884-1914) (Dutch)
- Lauwers, N., Georges Lorand (1860-1918): Een transnationale progressieve liberaal; VUB; 2016
