= Daens =

Daens might refer to:

- Adolf Daens, Belgian Flemish priest and politician
- Pieter Daens (novel), a novel by Louis Paul Boon
- Daens (film), a 1992 biographical film directed by Stijn Coninx based on Boon's novel
- 11571 Daens (1993 OR8), a main-belt asteroid, discovered in 1993
