= Belgian Labour Party =

Belgian Labour Party Belgische Werkliedenpartij (Dutch) Parti ouvrier belge (French)
- Abbreviation: BWP; POB
- President: Emile Vandervelde (first); Henri de Man (last)
- Founder(s): César De Paepe; Edward Anseele; Camille Huysmans; Jean Volders
- Founded: 6 April 1885
- Dissolved: 28 June 1940
- Succeeded by: Belgian Socialist Party
- Headquarters: Brussels, Belgium
- Newspaper: Le Peuple
- Trade union wing: General Federation of Belgian Labour
- Ideology: Social democracy Democratic socialism
- Political position: Centre-left to left-wing
- International affiliation: Second International (1889–1916); Labour and Socialist International (1923–40)
- Colours: Red

The Belgian Labour Party (Dutch: Belgische Werkliedenpartij [ˈbɛlɣisə ˈʋɛrklidə(m)pɑrˌtɛi], BWP; French: Parti ouvrier belge [paʁti uvʁije bɛlʒ], POB) was the first major socialist political party in Belgium. Founded in 1885, it achieved its first electoral breakthrough in the aftermath of World War I. Alongside the Catholic and Liberal Parties, the POB-BWP emerged as one of the major national governing parties. It was officially disbanded after the German invasion of Belgium in 1940 and superseded by the Belgian Socialist Party in 1945.

== History ==
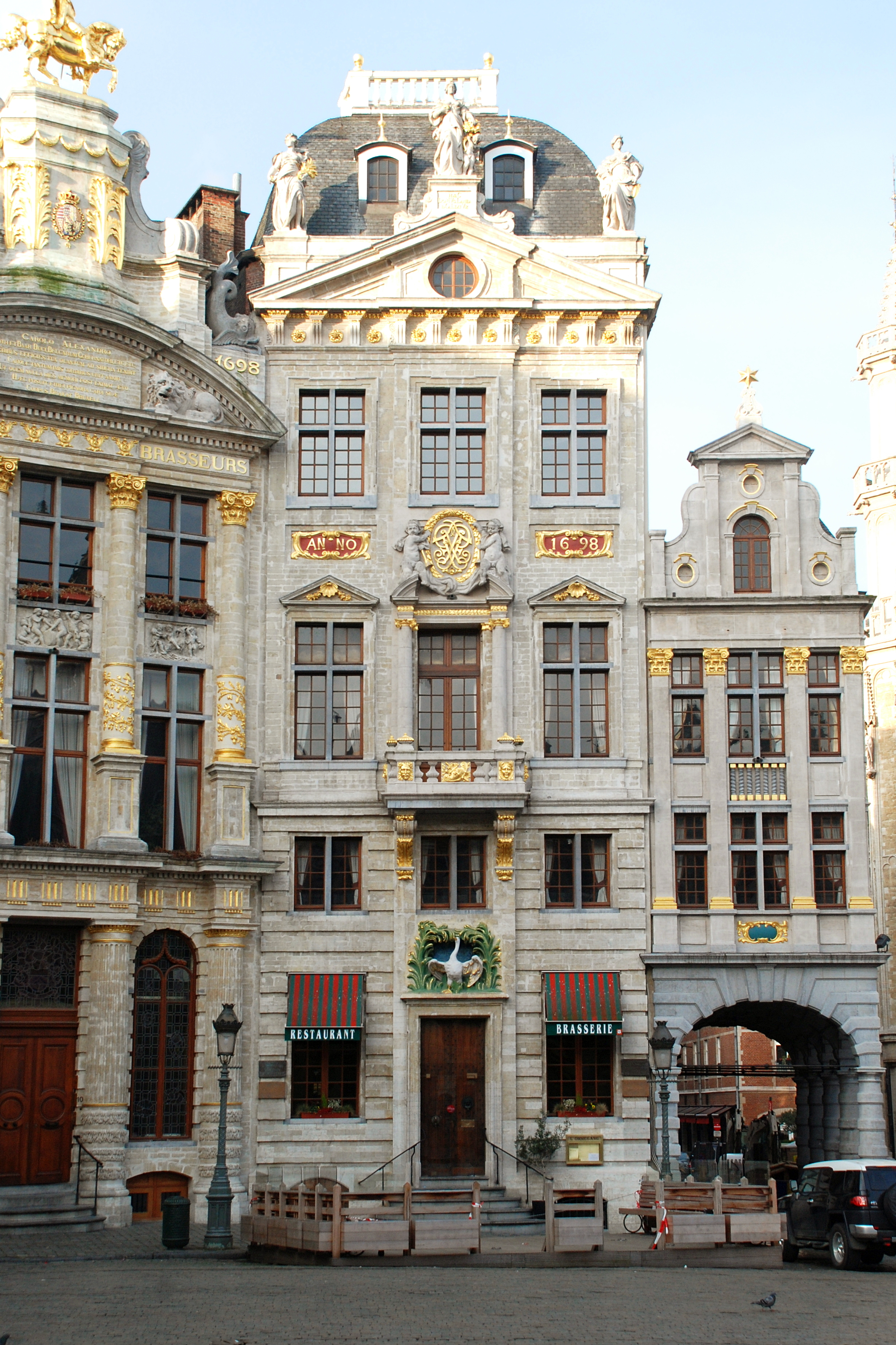
The Zwaan (Brussel) De Zwaan café in Brussels, where the POB-BWP was founded in 1885.

In April 1885, a meeting of 112 workers took place in a room of the café De Zwaan on the Grand-Place in Brussels, at the same place where the First International had convened, and where Karl Marx had written The Communist Manifesto. At this meeting the Belgian Labour Party (POB or BWP) was created. Several groups had been represented at this meeting, including the BSP of Edward Anseele. The members were mainly craftsmen and not workers from industrial centres (with the exception of Ghent). When drafting a programme for the new party, it was feared that a radical programme would deter workers. On that basis it was decided that the word socialism would not be mentioned in the name of the party, a point of view which was also defended by Cesar De Paepe (1841–1890).

The 1894 Charter of Quaregnon (located in this municipality and not in Mons because of the Garde Civique's 'fusillade of Mons'), of 1894 provided the doctrinal basis for the Belgian socialists from 1894 until 1979. Before 1919, the district system in Belgian elections made it almost impossible for the Labour Party to get parliamentary seats in Flanders, and the Ghent socialist leader, Edward Anseele, was elected in Liège. After 1919, universal male suffrage and proportional representation greatly enhanced the party's parliamentary strength and it participated in several governments.

In the 1919 election, the Belgian Labour Party won 36.6% of the vote and increased their parliamentary representation from 26 to 70 seats. This was enough to deny the Catholic Party the majority it had enjoyed since 1884, which led the Catholic Party to form a coalition with Labour, forming a cabinet that contained Labour members. The Belgian Labour Party used this opportunity to demand and to have passed reforms such as the repeal of a law that prohibited picketing, an eight-hour workday, old-age pensions, inheritance taxes, and a graduated income tax.

The party was a member of the Labour and Socialist International between 1923 and 1940.

After World War II, most of the BWP/POB officials joined to found the Belgian Socialist Party.

== Election results ==
Election year	Votes		Seats	Change
Election year	Number	Percentage	Seats	Change
1894	301,940	18.36%	27 / 152	▲27
1896	150,260	15.16%	27 / 152	Steady
1898	213,511	21.78%	15 / 152	12
1900^{[a]}	461,295	22.49%	32 / 152	▲17
1902	159,370	14.97%	32 / 166	17
1904	297,847	26.64%	29 / 166	3
1906	72,224	22.64%	25 / 166	4
1908	271,870	22.64%	25 / 166	Steady
1910	85,326	6.69%	25 / 166	Steady
1912	243,338	9.28%	18 / 186	7
1914	404,701	30.32%	32 / 186	▲14
1919	645,124	36.62%	70 / 186	▲38
1921	672,478	34.81%	68 / 186	2
1925	821,116	39.48%	78 / 187	▲10
1929	803,347	36.02%	70 / 187	8
1932	824,946	37.03%	73 / 187	▲3
1936	758,485	32.11%	70 / 202	3
1939	575,775	29.44%	64 / 166	6

^{a} This election saw the introduction of Proportional representation (PR), making Belgium the first country in Europe to adopt said voting system.

== Notable members ==
- Victor Serge, member of the youth section of the party.
- Edward Anseele
- Camille Huysmans
- Henri de Man
- Jules Destrée
- Paul-Henri Spaak, one of the Founding fathers of the European Union.
- Emile Vandervelde
- August Vermeylen

== See also ==
- Politics of Belgium
- Progressive Party (Belgium)
- Christene Volkspartij
