= 1896 Belgian general election =

- 5 July 1896

77 of the 152 seats in the Chamber of Representatives
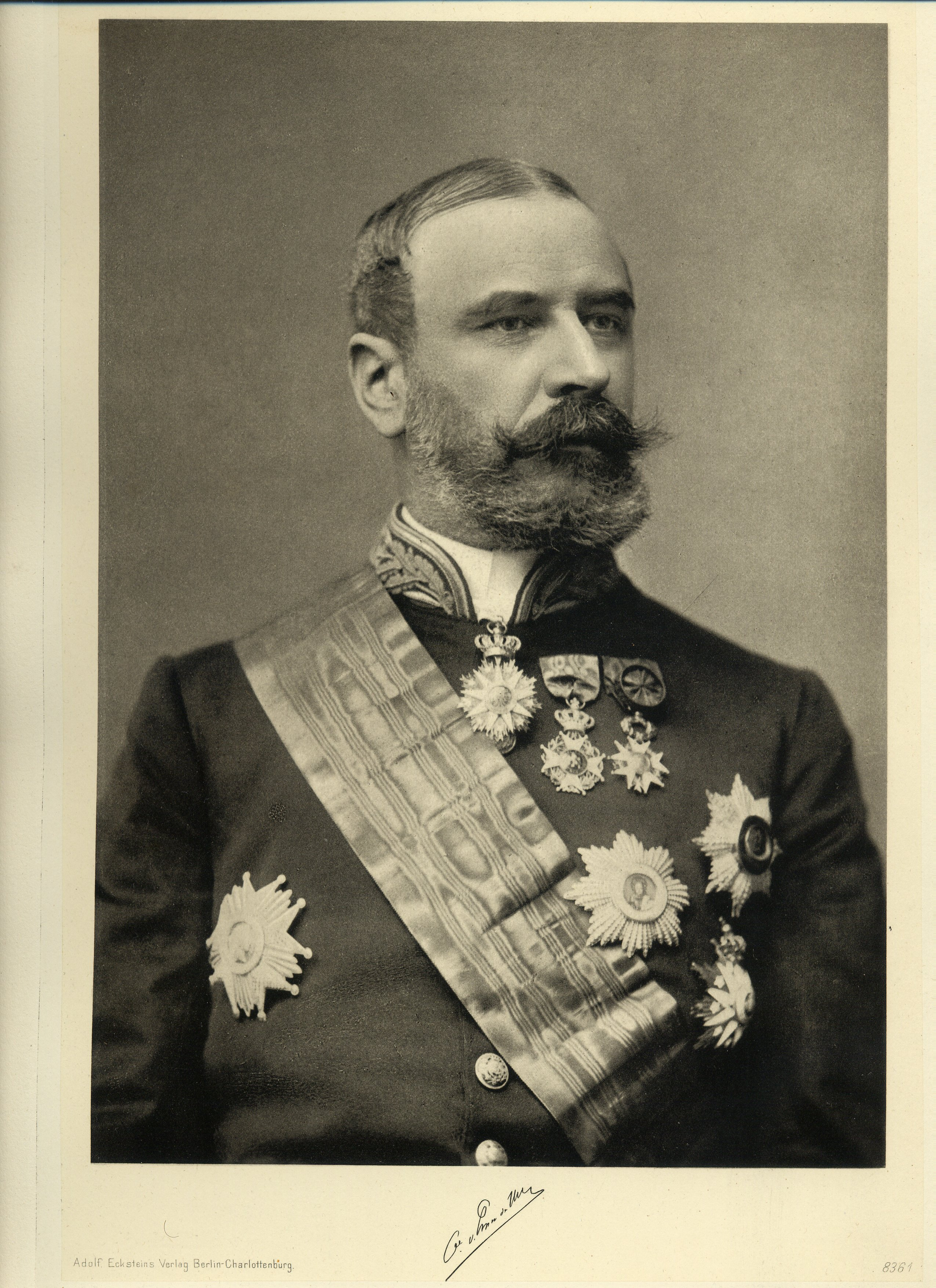

	First party	Second party	Third party
Leader	Paul de Smet de Naeyer		N/A
Party	Catholic	Liberal	Liberal–Socialist
Seats won	72	1	4
Popular vote	492,541	193,563	49,614
Percentage	49.68%	19.52%	5.00%
Government before election
de Smet de Naeyer I
Catholic
Government after election
de Smet de Naeyer I
Catholic

Partial legislative elections were held in Belgium on 5 and 12 July 1896. Under the alternating system, elections were held in only five of the nine provinces: Antwerp, Brabant, Luxembourg, Namur and West Flanders. Only 77 seats of the 152 seats in the Chamber of Representatives were up for election. The Catholic Party retained their absolute majority.

The Liberal Party, who lost two-thirds of their seats in the previous elections, saw their number of seats decrease further.

== Results ==
Party	Votes	%	Seats
Party	Votes	%	Won
Catholic Party	492,541	49.68	72
Liberal Party	193,563	19.52	1
Belgian Labour Party	150,260	15.16	0
Liberal–Socialist kartels	49,614	5.00	4
Other parties	105,394	10.63	0
Total	991,372	100.00	77
Source: Belgian Elections
