= Humbeeck =

Humbeeck or Van Humbeeck is a Belgian surname. Notable people with the surname include:

- Bruno Humbeeck, educational psychologist and the author of numerous publications
- Ernest Van Humbeeck (1839–1907), Belgian architect
- Jack Humbeeck (born 1904), Belgian boxer
- Pierre Van Humbeeck (1829–1890), Belgian lawyer and liberal politician
