= 1910 Belgian general election =

- 22 May 1910

87 of the 166 seats in the Chamber of Representatives
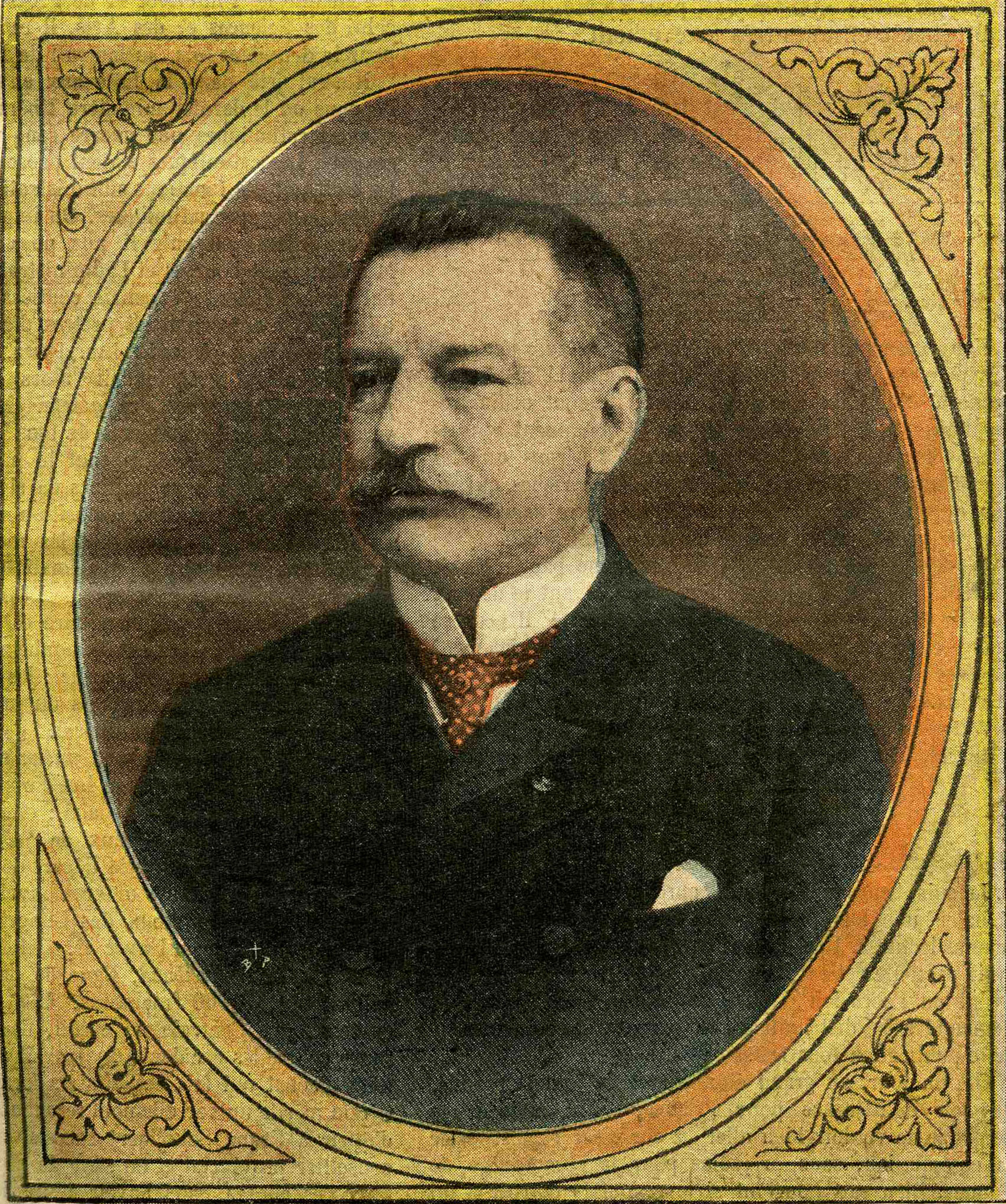

| | First party | Second party |
|---|---|---|
| Leader | Frans Schollaert |
| Party | Catholic | Liberal |
| Seats won | 49 | 15 |
| Popular vote | 676,849 | 236,467 |
| Percentage | 53.11% | 18.55% |
| | Third party | Fourth party |
| Leader | Georges Maes | N/A |
| Party | Labour | Liberal–Socialist |
| Seats won | 6 | 17 |
| Popular vote | 85,326 | 243,063 |
| Percentage | 6.69% | 19.07% |
Government before election
Schollaert
Catholic
Government after election
Schollaert
Catholic

Partial general elections were held in Belgium on 22 May 1910. The result was a victory for the Catholic Party, which won 49 of the 87 seats up for election in the Chamber of Representatives.

Under the alternating system, elections were only held in five out of the nine provinces: Antwerp, Brabant, Luxembourg, Namur and West Flanders.

== Results ==
Liberal Adolphe May defeated Catholic Emile de Lalieux de La Rocq in Nivelles and the socialist Joseph Bologne defeated liberal Léopold Gillard in Namur. All other representatives were either re-elected, or succeeded by candidates of the same party. Notably, Camille Huysmans (socialist of Antwerp) was elected for the first time.

| Party | Votes | % | Seats |
| Party | Votes | % | Won |
|---|---|---|---|
| Catholic Party | 676,849 | 53.11 | 49 |
| Liberal–Socialist kartels | 243,063 | 19.07 | 17 |
| Liberal Party | 236,467 | 18.55 | 15 |
| Belgian Labour Party | 85,326 | 6.69 | 6 |
| Catholic dissidents | 13,688 | 1.07 | 0 |
| Christene Volkspartij | 11,494 | 0.90 | 0 |
| Democratic Party | 872 | 0.07 | 0 |
| Socialist dissidents | 99 | 0.01 | 0 |
| Independents | 6,641 | 0.52 | 0 |
| Total | 1,274,499 | 100.00 | 87 |
| Valid votes | 1,274,499 | 97.53 | |
| Invalid/blank votes | 32,258 | 2.47 | |
| Total votes | 1,306,757 | 100.00 | |
Source: Belgian Elections
