= Woeste =

Woeste is a surname. Notable people with the surname include:

- Charles Woeste (1837–1922), Belgian politician
- Friedrich Leopold Woeste (1807–1878), German teacher
- Peter Woeste, German-Canadian television director, cinematographer, and camera operator
