= Daens (film) =

1992 film

- Theatrical release poster
- Directed by: Stijn Coninx
- Written by: François Chevallier; Stijn Coninx; Addy Weijers
- Based on: Pieter Daens by Louis Paul Boon
- Produced by: Dirk Impens; Jean-Luc Ormières; Maria Peters; Hans Pos; Dave Schram
- Starring: Jan Decleir; Gérard Desarthe; Antje de Boeck; Michael Pas
- Cinematography: Walther Vanden Ende
- Edited by: Ludo Troch
- Music by: Dirk Brossé
- Distributed by: Shooting Star Filmcompany (Netherlands)
- Release dates: September 1992 (Venice); 23 February 1993 (Netherlands)
- Running time: 138 minutes
- Countries: Belgium; Netherlands; France
- Languages: Dutch; French; Latin
- Box office: $0.49 million (Netherlands)

Daens is a 1992 Belgian period drama film directed by Stijn Coninx and based on a novel by Louis Paul Boon. The film stars Jan Decleir, Gérard Desarthe, Antje de Boeck, and Michael Pas, and recounts the life of Adolf Daens, a Catholic priest in Aalst who strives in the late 19th and early 20th century to improve the miserable working conditions in the local factories. It was nominated for the Academy Award for Best Foreign Language Film in 1992.

The film was shot in Belgium and also in Poland: in Łódź (Księży Młyn) and Piotrków Trybunalski.

In 2008, the film's screenplay was adapted into a stage musical.

== Plot ==
In 1890, Catholic priest Adolf Daens returns to his hometown, the Belgian municipality of Aalst, after a dispute with Bishop Antoon Stillemans. Daens moves in with his brother Pieter, publisher of the local newspaper Land Van Aelst.

Daens is upset when he learns about the bad work conditions in the textile industry. Workers are abused and exploited by the rich directors for their own profit. To gain more profit, the companies have just decided to fire all the men and replace them with women, whose wages are much lower. Children are working both day and night shifts. Severe accidents have happened to children who fall asleep; some have been injured by the mechanical looms. Industrial accidents happen continuously, and the management takes no action.

A new catastrophe will soon happen: Stephane Borremans is about to fire 50% of his employees. His action is supported by Charles Woeste, a politician from the Catholic Party in the Chamber of Representatives.

Daens resists and wants to stop this action. His brother helps him by publishing accounts of abuses in the textile industry. Daens becomes a campaigner and, later on, is elected as a member of the Chamber of Representatives.

Nette Scholliers is 17 and the eldest daughter of a Catholic family. As her parents have been made redundant, she is the only one to earn money to support her whole family. As soon as she hears about Daens's plans, she supports him. Daens is also supported by the liberal and the socialist parties. Jan, a socialist, falls in love with Nette, and the pair start a forbidden romance.

Daens starts to doubt whether he can really change the terrible conditions. Furthermore, as he chooses the side of the poor people, he gets into a conflict with the rich directors, the Catholic party, and the Catholic Church. Father Daens is a thorn in their side as he has become a symbol in the hardline freedom struggle of the workers.

Woeste sets up a plot in which he involves the Holy See. Daens is summoned by Pope Leo XIII and is presented with a choice: either he stays a priest or he becomes a politician. Daens ignores the warnings and continues both of his activities, which leads to his defrocking.

Eventually, Daens convinces Belgian politicians that working conditions must improve and workers must have more rights. Thanks to this action, the directors are forced to invest in better working conditions and to assume greater responsibility for the prevention of accidents.

== Cast ==
- Jan Decleir – Adolf Daens
- Gérard Desarthe – Charles Woeste
- Antje de Boeck – Nette Scholliers
- Michael Pas – Jan De Meeter
- Karel Baetens – Jefke
- Julien Schoenaerts – Bishop Stillemans
- Wim Meuwissen – Pieter Daens
- Brit Alen – Louise Daens
- Johan Leysen – Schmitt
- Idwig Stéphane – Eugene Borremans
- Jappe Claes – Ponnet
- Frank Vercruyssen – Louis Scholliers
- Matthias Schoenaerts – Wannes Scholliers
- Bart Geyskens – schoolboy

== Reception ==
Quentin Curtis of the Independent was generally negative, writing that while the film differentiated from Hollywood movies, he felt "it wouldn't have been cheap glamorising to have included some action. Or even some rhetoric: we often hear Daens declaiming his case, but he's uninspiringly plain-spoken." He concluded discussing the film by writing that "[a]fter the dangerous wit of Man Bites Dog, Daens restores our prejudices about Belgian cinema: it's long, worthy, and a bit dull."

== Awards and nominations ==
Year	Group	Award	Winner/Nominee	Result
1992	Valladolid International Film Festival	Spilver Spike - Best film	Stijn Coninx	Won
1992	Valladolid International Film Festival	Audience Award - Best film		Won
1992	Valladolid International Film Festival	Golden Spike - Best film		Nominated
1992	Venice Film Festival	OCIC Award - Honorable mention	Stijn Coninx	Won
1993	Academy Awards	Best Foreign Language Film		Nominated
1993	European Film Awards	Best Actor	Jan Decleir	Nominated
1993	Shanghai International Film Festival	Best Actor	Jan Decleir	Won
1993	Shanghai International Film Festival	Best Film		Won
1993	Joseph Plateau Awards	Best Belgian Actor	Jan Decleir	Won
1993	Joseph Plateau Awards	Best Belgian Actress	Antje de Boeck	Won
1993	Joseph Plateau Awards	Best Belgian Director	Stijn Coninx	Won
1993	Joseph Plateau Awards	Best Belgian Film		Won
1993	Joseph Plateau Awards	Box Office Award		Won
1993	Chicago International Film Festival	Special Jury Prize Cinematography	Walther van den Ende	Won

== See also ==
- List of submissions to the 65th Academy Awards for Best Foreign Language Film
- List of Belgian submissions for the Academy Award for Best Foreign Language Film
