= Omer Vanaudenhove =

Belgian liberal politician, mayor and minister

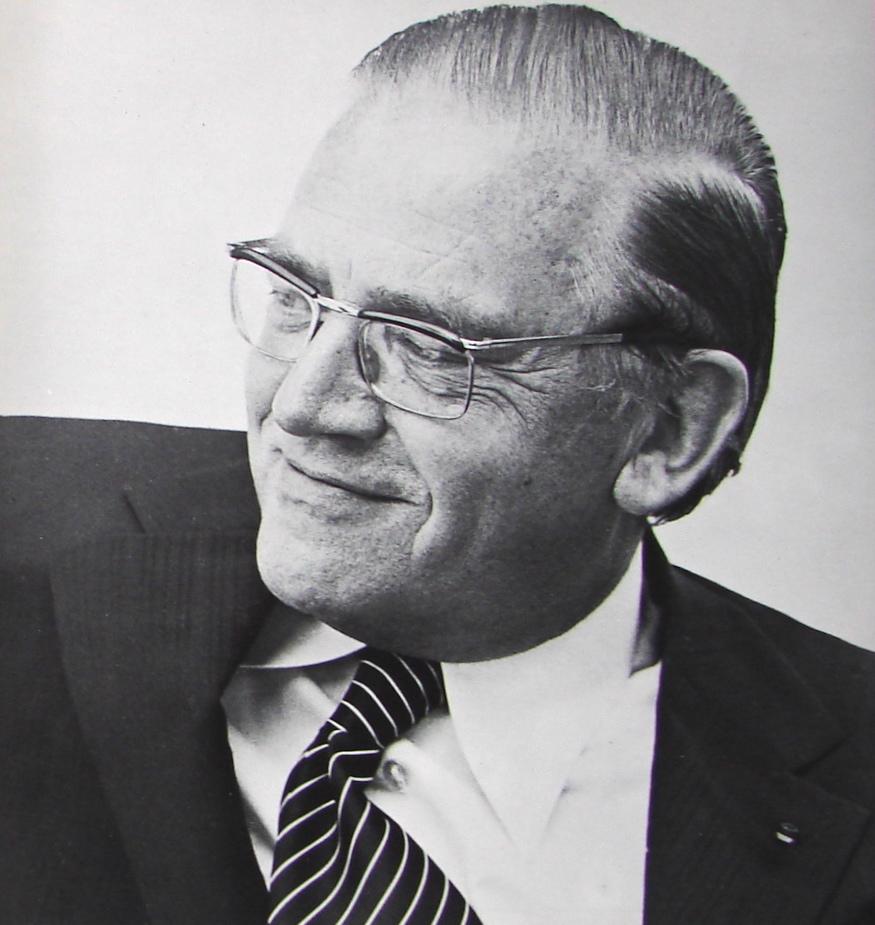
- Omer Vanaudenhove (1976)
- Born: Omer Rudolphe Jean; 3 December 1913; Diest, Belgium
- Died: 26 November 1994 (aged 80); Leuven, Belgium
- Occupation: politician

Omer Rudolphe Jean, Viscount Vanaudenhove (3 December 1913 – 26 November 1994) was a Belgian liberal politician, mayor and minister. A businessman, Vanaudenhove was an owner of a shoe factory. He was mayor of Diest (1947–1955 and 1974–1976), liberal senator (1954–1974), president of the Liberal Party (1961) and president and founder of the PVV-PLP (1961–1969).

In the new party programme of the PVV-PLP, the traditional anticlericalism of the liberal party was renounced. This new organization achieved success at the parliamentary elections of 1965 and gained 48 seats (compared to the 20 gained in 1961). Vanaudenhove was a proponent of a unitary Belgium and a unitarian PVV-PLP, but the tendency towards a federal state became unstoppable by the end of the sixties. Vanaudenhove was minister of public work and rebuilding between 1955–1958 and 1958–1961.

== See also ==
- Liberalism in Belgium

== Sources ==
- 60 jaar bevrijding van de kampen: een selectie uit de archieven van liberale voormannen (Dutch)
- Omer Vanaudenhove
