= 1906 Belgian general election =

- 27 May 1906

83 of the 166 seats in the Chamber of Representatives
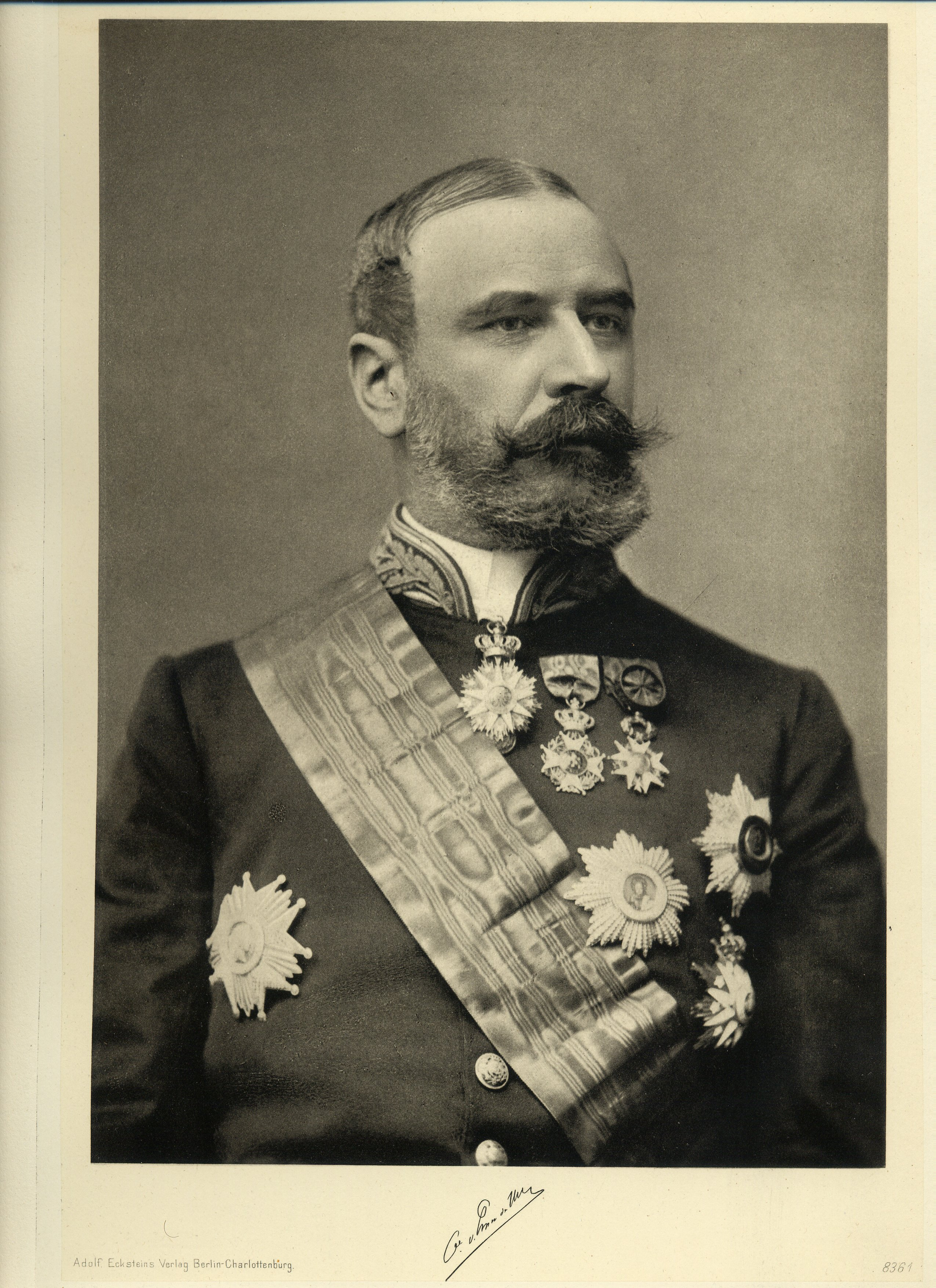

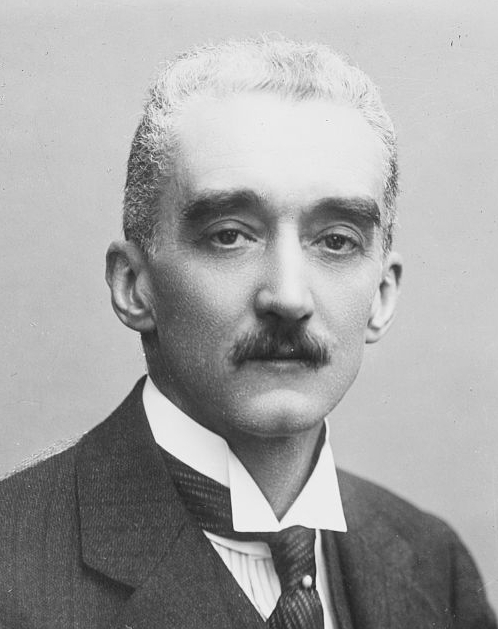

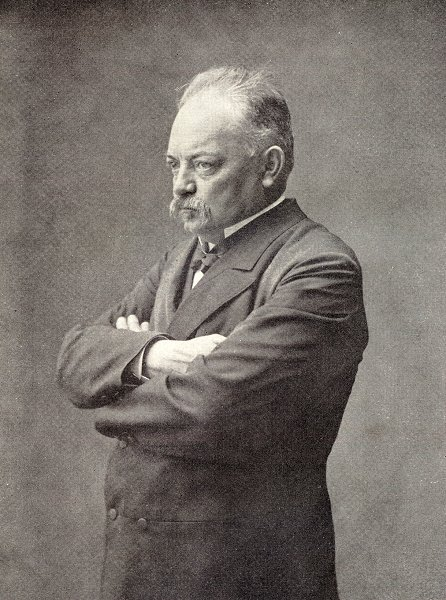
	First party	Second party	Third party
Leader	Paul de Smet de Naeyer	Paul Hymans	Émile Vandervelde
Party	Catholic Party	Liberal Party	Belgian Labour Party
Seats won	41	15	6
Popular vote	526,856	207,341	72,224
Percentage	44.92%	17.68%	22.64%
	Fourth party	Fifth party
Leader	Paul Janson
Party	Liberal–Socialist Cartel	PCO
Seats won	12	9
Popular vote	224,357	109,590
Percentage	19.13%	9.34%
Government before election
de Smet de Naeyer II
Catholic
Government after election
de Smet de Naeyer II
Catholic

Partial general elections were held in Belgium on 27 May 1906. The Catholic Party won 41 of the 83 seats up for election in the Chamber of Representatives.

Under the alternating system, elections were only held in five out of the nine provinces: Antwerp, Brabant, Luxembourg, Namur and West Flanders.

The Catholic Party lost its majority in the Chamber of Representatives for the first time since 1884.

== Results ==
Party	Votes	%	Seats
Party	Votes	%	Won
Catholic Party	526,856	44.92	41
Liberal–Socialist kartels	224,357	19.13	12
Liberal Party	207,341	17.68	15
Catholic Workers' Party	109,590	9.34	9
Belgian Labour Party	72,224	6.16	6
Christene Volkspartij	9,800	0.84	0
Merchants	5,231	0.45	0
Catholic dissidents	2,724	0.23	0
Flemish People's Party	1,284	0.11	0
Workers' Party	802	0.07	0
Socialist dissidents	428	0.04	0
Independents	12,191	1.04	0
Total	1,172,828	100.00	83
Source: Belgian Elections
