= Léon Dens =

Belgian politician

- Born: Léon Pierre Alphonse Dens; 17 October 1869; Antwerp, Belgium
- Died: 16 November 1940 (age 71); London, United Kingdom
- Occupations: politician, shipowner

Léon Pierre Alphonse Dens (17 October 1869 – 16 November 1940) was a Belgian politician and shipowner. A member of the Liberal Party, he was killed during the Blitz.

== Family ==
He was son of Charles Dens. He married Louise Lejeune, who predeceased him.

== Political career ==
- 1925–1940: senator for the district Antwerp
- 1931–1932: minister of defense
- 1935–1936: President of the Liberal Party

== Honours ==
This list is incomplete

- Grand Officer Order of Leopold (Belgium)
- Grand Cordon Order of Skanderbeg (Albania)
- Commander of the Order of the British Empire (United Kingdom)

== Death ==
Following the German invasion of Belgium in the Second World War he became an exile in England and was killed during an air raid when the Savoy Hotel in London, was bombed in November 1940.

== Sources ==
- Presidents of the Belgian liberal party
