= Octave Dierckx =

Belgian politician

- Born: Octave Victor Anna Dierckx; 15 October 1882; Antwerp, Belgium
- Died: 21 March 1955 (aged 72); Brussels, Belgium
- Occupations: politician, lawyer

Octave Victor Anna Dierckx (15 October 1882 – 21 March 1955) was a Belgian liberal and politician. Dierckx was a doctor in law and a lawyer.

== Political career ==
- municipality Council member in Elsene
- 1929–1955: senator
- 1933–1934: President of the Liberal Party
- 1934–1935: minister of transportation
- 1937–1938: minister of the interior
- 1938–1939: minister of public education
- 1949–1950: minister without portfolio

== Sources ==
- Presidents of the Belgian liberal party
