= Maurice Destenay =

Belgian politician (1900–1973)

- Born: Maurice Jean Léon Destenay; 18 February 1900; Tilleur, Belgium
- Died: 1 September 1973 (aged 73); Liège, Belgium
- Occupation: politician

Maurice Jean Léon Destenay (French: [detənɛ]; 18 February 1900 – 1 September 1973) was a Belgian liberal politician and burgomaster. Destenay was a teacher and pedagogue and became the founder and director of the monthly magazine Action Libérale. He became alderman and burgomaster (1963–1973) in Liege and a member of parliament (1949–1965) in the district of Liege. Between 1954 and 1958, he was President of the Liberal Party.
