= Joseph Bologne (politician) =

Belgian politician

Joseph Bologne (French: [ʒozɛf bɔlɔɲ]; 17 November 1871, Liège – 17 September 1959, Liège) was a Belgian socialist politician.

He was elected on 22 May 1910 as representative for Namur, although he lived in Liège. He served until 1932, when he became senator.

He became mayor of Liège in 1940. On 1 November 1942, the Nazis dismissed him for blocking their attempts to take over; he was reinstated briefly in 1944. It was found out at Bologne had collaborated with the Nazis at least to some degree.
