= François Bailleux =

Belgian lawyer

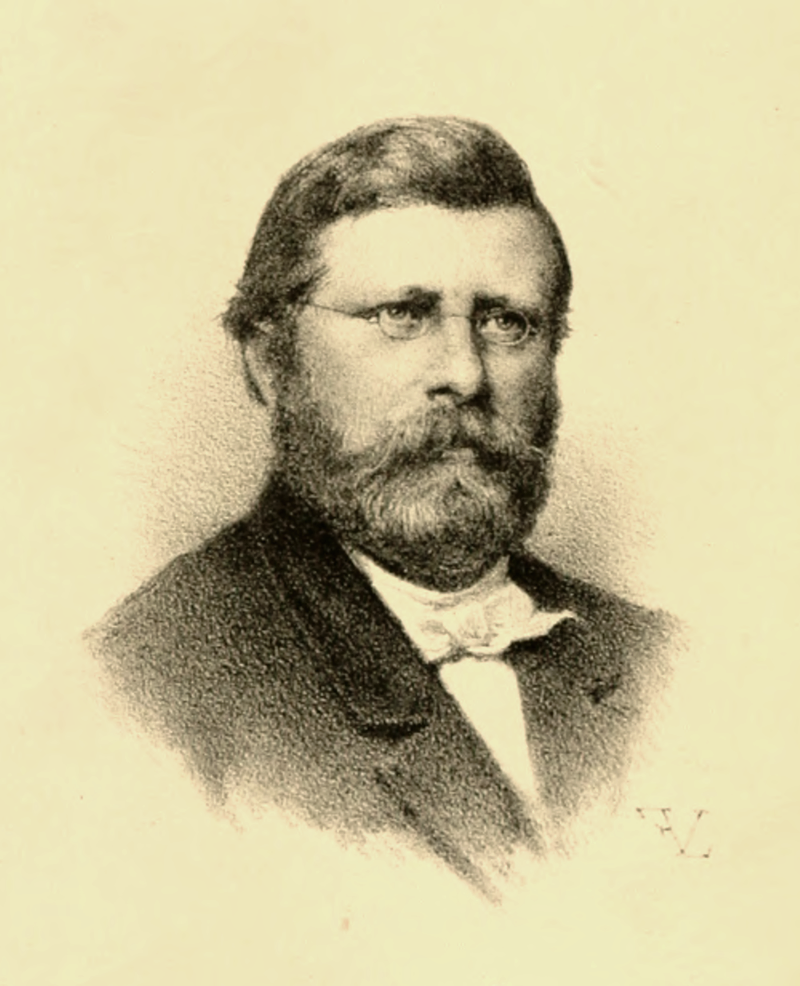
A lithograph of Bailleux by Florimond Van Loo

François Bailleux was born in Liège on 23 August 1817, and died there of heart failure on 24 January 1866. A lawyer by profession, he played a leading part in the revival of Walloon literature after Belgium gained its independence.

== Career ==
François Bailleux was born into a family of professional background. After schooling and university training in Liège he became a Doctor of Law in 1841 and worked as a barrister for the rest of his life. He was a Liberal in politics and consecrated much of his time to promoting their cause. After helping unite the two wings of this party in 1846, he was made secretary of the Liberal Union and in 1859 was elected to a seat in the provincial assembly.

=== Walloon literature ===
Liège had a long tradition of dialect writing and Bailleux manifested his gifts early by employing it to compose political songs at the start of his career. Later he diversified his writing and published as Passe-timps (Diversions) a collection of ten pieces with only a limited printing in 1845. Included there was the lyric Marèye, an evocation of young love that afterwards was to become popular when it was set to music by Eugène Hutoy (1844–89).

Meanwhile Bailleux dedicated himself to the study of writing in Walloon and with his friend Joseph Dejardin (1819–95) he collected an anthology of songs from the 17th and 18th centuries which, published in 1844, was the first of several more volumes of ancient dialect literature. Then in 1856 he was among the group of enthusiasts who founded the Société liégeoise de littérature wallonne, of which he was made secretary. He had in the meantime engaged himself in making versions of La Fontaine's Fables, initially in partnership with Jean-Joseph Dehin (1809–71), and by 1856 had completed the first six books of Fâves da Lafontaine mettowes è ligeois (La Fontaine’s Fables adapted in the language of Liège). These masterly imitations, arranged to display the individuality of the dialect, were more independent works in their own right than simple translations, as can be seen by comparing La Fontaine’s Les voleurs et l’âne (The thieves and the ass, Fables 1.13) with Bailleux’s recreation of it:

On account of the nag that they’ve nabbed
And one wants to keep, t’other sell,
Two thieves have a hair-pulling mell
And exchange with the handfuls they’ve grabbed
A smack in the gob for a boot in the gut
Till a third runs away with the loot.

Bar christening, that beast could pass for the lass
That keeps two steadies on a string
And while they fling their fists about, she’ll beat it
With another who makes her…(I mustn’t repeat it!)

In addition Bailleux published three extended verse fables based on traditional accounts under the title Vèyes fâves d’à m’ grand-mére (Old tales my granny told me, 1852-4).
