= Liberté chérie =

Masonic Lodge

Liberté chérie (French for "Cherished Liberty") was a Masonic Lodge founded in 1943 by imprisoned freemasons at Esterwegen concentration camp. It was one of the few lodges of Freemasons founded within a Nazi concentration camp during the Second World War.

== The Lodge ==
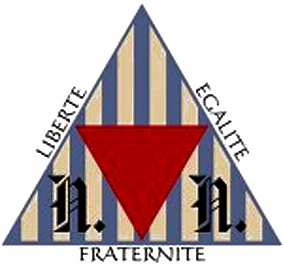
Symbol for Respectable Loge Liberté Chérie

On 15 November 1943, seven Belgian Freemasons and resistance fighters founded the Masonic Lodge Loge Liberté chérie (French: Cherished Liberty Lodge) inside Hut 6 of Emslandlager VII (Esterwegen). The name of the lodge was derived from La Marseillaise.

The original seven Freemasons of Loge Liberté chérie were:

- *Paul Hanson
- Luc Somerhausen
- Jean De Schrijver
- Jean Sugg
- Henri Story
- Amédée Miclotte
- Franz Rochat
- Guy Hannecart

They later initiated, passed, and raised Brother Fernand Erauw, another Belgian.

According to M. Franz Bridoux, former prisoner in Esterwegen's Hut 6, the founding members of Loge Liberté chérie were Rochat, Sugg, Hannecart, Hanson, Somerhausen, Degueldre, and Miclotte.

De Schrijver and M. Story arrived well after the establishment of the lodge and were not founding members, but members only.

Paul Hanson was elected master. The brethren met for lodge work in Hut 6 around a table, which was otherwise used for cartridge sorting. A Catholic priest stood watch, so that the brethren could hold their meetings, and protected their secrecy.

Hut 6 was used for foreign Nacht und Nebel (German: Night and Fog) prisoners. The Emslandlagercamps were a group of camps whose history is represented by a permanent exhibition in the Documentation and Information Centre in Papenburg, Germany. Altogether 15 camps were established on the Netherlands border, with central administration in Papenburg.

Luc Somerhausen described Erauw's initiation, etc., as just simple ceremonies. These ceremonies (in the maintenance of the secrecy of which, they asked the community of Catholic priests for assistance, "with their prayers") "took place at one of the tables ... after a very highly simplified ritual—whose individual components were however explained to the initiate; that from now on he could participate in the work of the Lodge".

More than a hundred prisoners were in Hut 6, and locked up nearly around the clock — allowed to leave only for a half-hour walk per day, under supervision. During the day, half of the camp had to sort cartridges and radio parts. The prisoners of the other half of the camp were forced to work under dreadful conditions in the surrounding peat bogs. The nutrition was so miserable that the prisoners lost on average 4 kilograms (8.8 lb) of body weight each month.

After the first ritual meeting, with the admission of the new brother, further meetings were thematically prepared. One was dedicated to the symbol of the Great Architect of the Universe, another to "the future of Belgium", and a further one to "the position of women in Freemasonry". Only Somerhausen and Erauw survived detention, and the lodge stopped meeting at the beginning of 1944.

Memorial at Esterwegen concentration camp

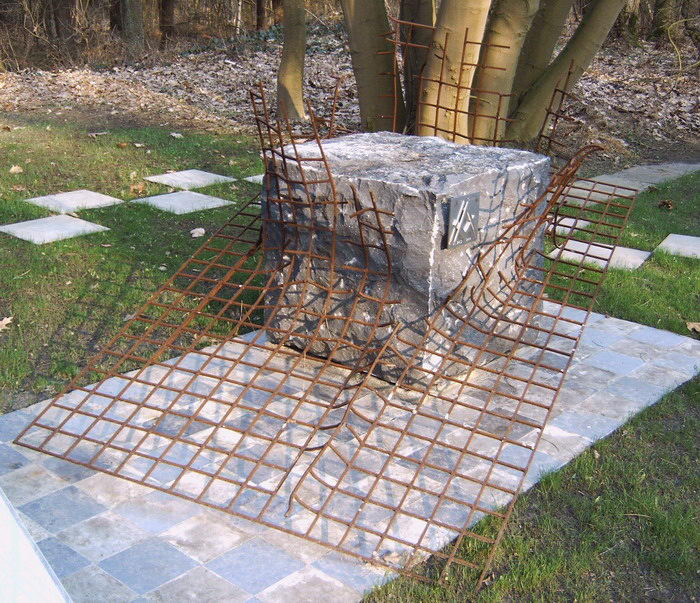
Memorial at Esterwegen

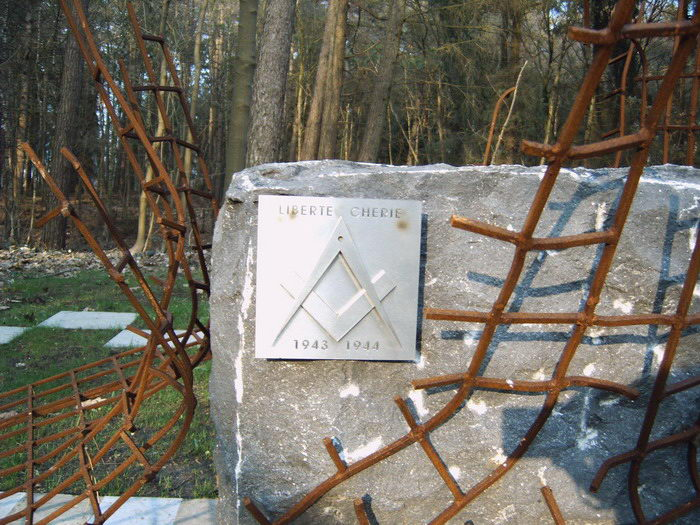
close-up

== Members ==
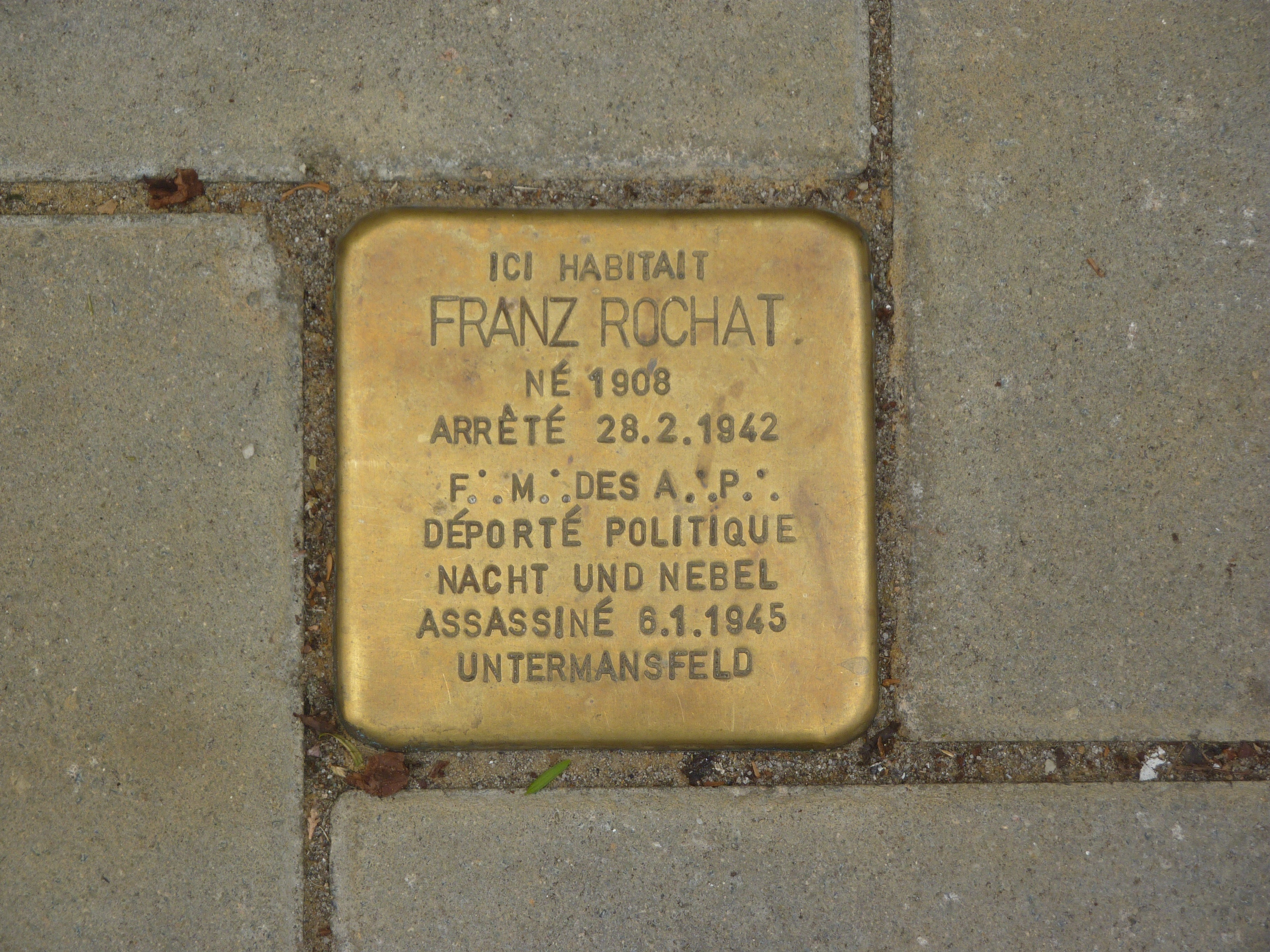
Stolperstein for Franz Rochat in the Avenue Clays, Schaerbeek

Lodge Master Paul Hanson was moved, and died in the rubble of his prison, during an Allied air bombardment on Essen, on March 26, 1944. Jean Sugg and Franz Rochat, belonged to the Philanthropic Friends Lodge (Les Amis Philanthropes, Lodge No. 5 of the Grand Orient of Belgium).

Franz Rochat, a professor, pharmacist, and director of an important pharmaceutical laboratory, was born on 10 March 1908 in Saint-Gilles. He was a worker in the underground press, and the resistance publication Voice of the Belgians. He was arrested on 28 February 1942, arrived at Untermaßfeld in April 1944, and died there on 6 April 1945.

Jean Sugg was born 8 September 1897 in Ghent and was of Swiss German origin. He co-operated with Franz Rochat in the underground press, translated German and Swiss texts, and contributed to clandestine publications, including, La Libre Belgique, La Légion Noire, Le Petit Belge, and L'Anti Boche. He died in a concentration camp on 8 February 1945.

Amédée Miclotte was a high school teacher. He was born 20 December 1902 in Lahamaide, and belonged to the lodge Union et Progrès. He was last seen in detention, on 8 February 1945.

Jean De Schrijver, was a colonel in the Belgian Army. He was born 23 August 1893 in Aalst, and was a brother of the lodge La Liberté in Ghent. On 2 September 1943 he was arrested on charges of espionage and possession of arms, and died in February 1945.

Henri Story was born on 27 November 1897 in Ghent. He was a member of the lodge Le Septentrion in Ghent. He died on 5 December 1944.

Luc Somerhausen, a journalist, was born on 26 August 1903, in Hoeilaart. He was arrested on 28 May 1943 in Brussels. He belonged to the lodge ACSO III and was deputy secretary of the Grand Orient of Belgium (Grand Orient de Belgique).

Fernand Erauw, an assessor at the Audit Office, and reserve officer with the Infantry, was born on 29 January 1914, in Wemmel. He was arrested on 4 August 1942, as a member of the "Secret Army". He escaped and was finally arrested in 1943.

Guy Hannecart (1903–1945) a lawyer and leader of La Voix des Belges. He was also member of the lodge les Amis Philanthropes N°3.

Survivors Erauw and Somerhausen met again 1944 in the Oranienburg Sachsenhausen concentration camp, and remained inseparable from then on. In the spring of 1945 they were involved in the death marches, and although Erauw was 1.84 m tall, he weighed only 32 kg on 21 May 1945 — in the Saint Pierre Hospital in Brussels.

In August 1945 Luc Somerhausen sent a detailed report to the grand master of the Grand Orient of Belgium, in which he delineated the history of the loge Liberté chérie. Luc Somerhausen died in 1982 at the age of 79. The last witness, Fernand Erauw, died at the age of 83, in 1997.

== The memorial ==
A memorial, created by architect Jean de Salle, was raised by Belgian and German Freemasons on 13 November 2004. It is now part of the memorial site of the Esterwegen Cemetery. Wim Rutten, the grand master of the Belgian Federation of the Le Droit Humain said during an address:

We are gathered here today on this Cemetery in Esterwegen, not to mourn, but to express free thoughts in public." - "In memory of our brothers; human rights should never be forgotten.

== See also ==
- Grand Orient of Belgium
- History of Freemasonry
- Suppression of Freemasonry
- National Museum of the Resistance
