= Edward Anseele =

Belgian politician

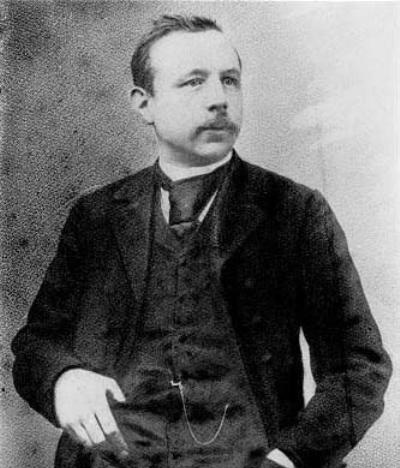
- Born: 26 July 1856; Ghent, Belgium
- Died: 18 February 1938 (aged 81); Ghent, Belgium
- Occupations: Journalist, politician
- Political party: Belgian Labor Party

Edward Anseele (26 July 1856 – 18 February 1938) was a Belgian socialist politician. Edward Anseele became active in the early Belgian socialist movement. Anseele attended the Royal Athenaeum in Ghent until the age of 17.

== Career ==
Edward Anseele came from a liberal family of shoemakers. He received several years of secondary education at the Royal Atheneum at the Voskenslaan in Ghent, which in view of his humble origins was at the time rather exceptional. After his studies he went to work as a clerk. The socialist congress of 1877, in Ghent was the start of his socialist commitment. He became employed as a journalist of the magazine De Volkswil, later transformed into the socialist daily Vooruit! (English: "Forward!"). He organized a cooperative bakery Vooruit which was founded in 1880. This was the start of a complete range of cooperative ventures which in the long term would create an industrial empire. This way, Anseele tried to create a counterweight to the capitalist ventures, and was able to provide support to workers' actions. During the economic crisis of the thirties this network of cooperatives would be largely lost.

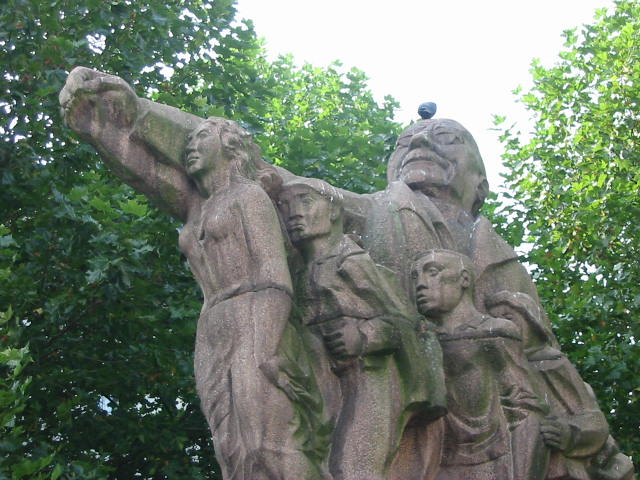
Statue of Edward Anseele on the Frankrijkplein in Ghent

Anseele was for a long time municipality Council member and alderman in Ghent, temporary burgomaster and a member of parliament. He was one of the founders of the socialist Belgische Werkliedenpartij. During World War I the Germans offered him the title of President of Belgium, which he declined. After the war, he was rewarded for this stance with several ministerial functions: from 1918 until 1921, he was the minister for Public Works and from 1925 until 1927, minister of Railroads and PTT (Mail Telegraph and Telephone). In 1930, he got the honorary title of Minister of State.

== Bibliography ==
- Voor 't volk geofferd (1881)
- De omwenteling van 1830 (1882)
- De algemeene werkstaking (1888)
- De ware vijand van werkman en kleinen burger (1890)
- De samenwerking en het socialisme (1902)
- Vooruit en de Vlaamsche Beweging (1913)

== Sources ==
- Edward Anseele
- Paul Kenis, Het leven van Edward Anseele, Publ. De Vlam
