= Roger Motz =

Belgian politician (1904–1964)

- Born: Roger Jean Henri Motz; 8 July 1904; Schaerbeek, Belgium
- Died: 27 March 1964 (aged 59); Brussels, Belgium
- Occupation: politician

Roger Jean Henri Motz (8 July 1904 – 27 March 1964) was a Belgian liberal politician. Motz was a mine-engineer and governor of companies. He was municipality council member and a member of parliament for Brussels and as from 1946 senator.

After World War II he was from 1945 up to 1953 President of the Liberal Party and once again of 1958 up to 1961 in run-up to the transformation of the liberal party to the PVV. From 1952 up to 1958 he was President of the Liberal International. He was also President of the Belgian League for European Cooperation.

== Sources ==
- Presidents of the Belgian liberal party at Liberaal Archief - 2002 archive (in Dutch)
- Roger Motz - bio in Hall of Freedom at Liberal International - 2016 archive
- Roger Motz (in French)

Political offices
Preceded by Salvador de Madariaga	President of the Liberal International; 1952–1958	Succeeded by Giovanni Malagodi
