= Charles Woeste =

Belgian Roman Catholic politician of German descent

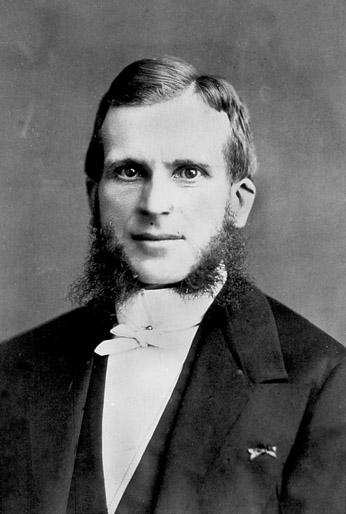
- Born: 26 February 1837; Brussels, Belgium
- Died: 5 April 1922 (aged 85)
- Occupation: Politician
- Political party: Catholic Party

Charles, Count Woeste (26 February 1837 – 5 April 1922), was a Belgian Roman Catholic politician of German descent.

He was born in Brussels, the son of Edouard Woeste, who was of Prussian descent who became a naturalized Belgian on 15 January 1841. Edouard Woeste was consul for Prussia from 1843 to 1853 and married Constance Vauthier on 24 September 1834. In August 1855 Charles converted from Lutheranism, Prussian aristocracy's religion, to Catholicism, under the influence of his mother and father Delcourt. On 4 January 1866, he married Marie Greindl, daughter of lieutenant-general Léonard Greindl, who had been minister of war in the government of Pierre de Decker (1855).

== Education ==
In October 1847, Charles joined the Royal Athenaeum of Brussels. Among his classmates were Edmond Picard, Charles Graux, Emile de Mot, Xavier Olin, and Pierre Van Humbeeck. He obtained the title of Doctor in Law at the Universite Libre de Bruxelles in 1858.

== Career ==
He began his career as a lawyer at the bar of Brussels. His political career developed within the Catholic Party and he played a very important role in this party. He started his political career at the Catholic Conference in Mechelen. In 1869, Woeste founded the Verbond van Katholieke Kringen, an early attempt to create a Catholic party. In 1921, this party was renamed in the Catholic Union of workers, citizens, tradesmen and farmers. After his death, on the occasion of the large election defeat of the Catholics in 1936 this Catholic Union was replaced by the Catholic Block.

During his political career, Woeste was a longtime member of the Belgian parliament for the district Aalst, after earlier attempts in the district Bruges had failed. In Aalst, he and Count Bobbejaan Honoré (1846–1933) opposed the Christian Democratic priest Adolf Daens and his Christene Volkspartij. Woeste strongly opposed the rising social state interventionism of the Christian Democrats.

On 15 November 1891, he was made Minister of State. Pope Leo XIII also bestowed upon him the Pro Ecclesia et Pontifice.

Woeste spent the rest of his life in Brussels, and a street there is named after him. A bust was erected in his honour on Place Boniface in Ixelles.

== Honours ==
- Belgium : Created Count Woeste, by Royal decree of 8 May 1914.
- Belgium : Minister of state, by Royal decree.
- Belgium : Grand Cordon in the Order of Leopold.
- Vatican : Knight Grand Cross in the Pontifical Order of Pius IX.
- Vatican : Knight Grand Cross in the Pontifical Order of Saint Gregory the Great.
- Vatican : Knight Grand Cross in the Pontifical Supreme Order of Christ.
- Vatican : Pro Ecclesia et Pontifice.

== See also ==
- K.A.V. Lovania Leuven
- Charles Woeste in ODIS - Online Database for Intermediary Structures

== Sources ==
- Charles Woeste (French)
