= Fernand Demets =

Belgian politician (1884–1952)

- Born: Fernand Charles Gustave Demets; 8 March 1884; Saint-Gilles
- Died: 29 September 1952 (aged 68); Brussels
- Occupation: politician

Fernand Charles Gustave Demets (French: [dəmɛ]; 8 March 1884 – 29 September 1952) was a Belgian liberal politician, burgomaster, and defense minister. Demets was an industrialist and became a municipal council member (1911–1929) and burgomaster (1919–1927) in Anderlecht, then a Liberal senator (1929–1945) in the district of Brussels. Demets was co-president of the Liberal Party (1940–1945). He was minister of defense in 1944-1945 and afterwards became governor of the province of Brabant (1945–1951).

== Sources ==
- Presidents of the Belgian liberal party
