= Albert Mechelynck =

Belgian liberal politician

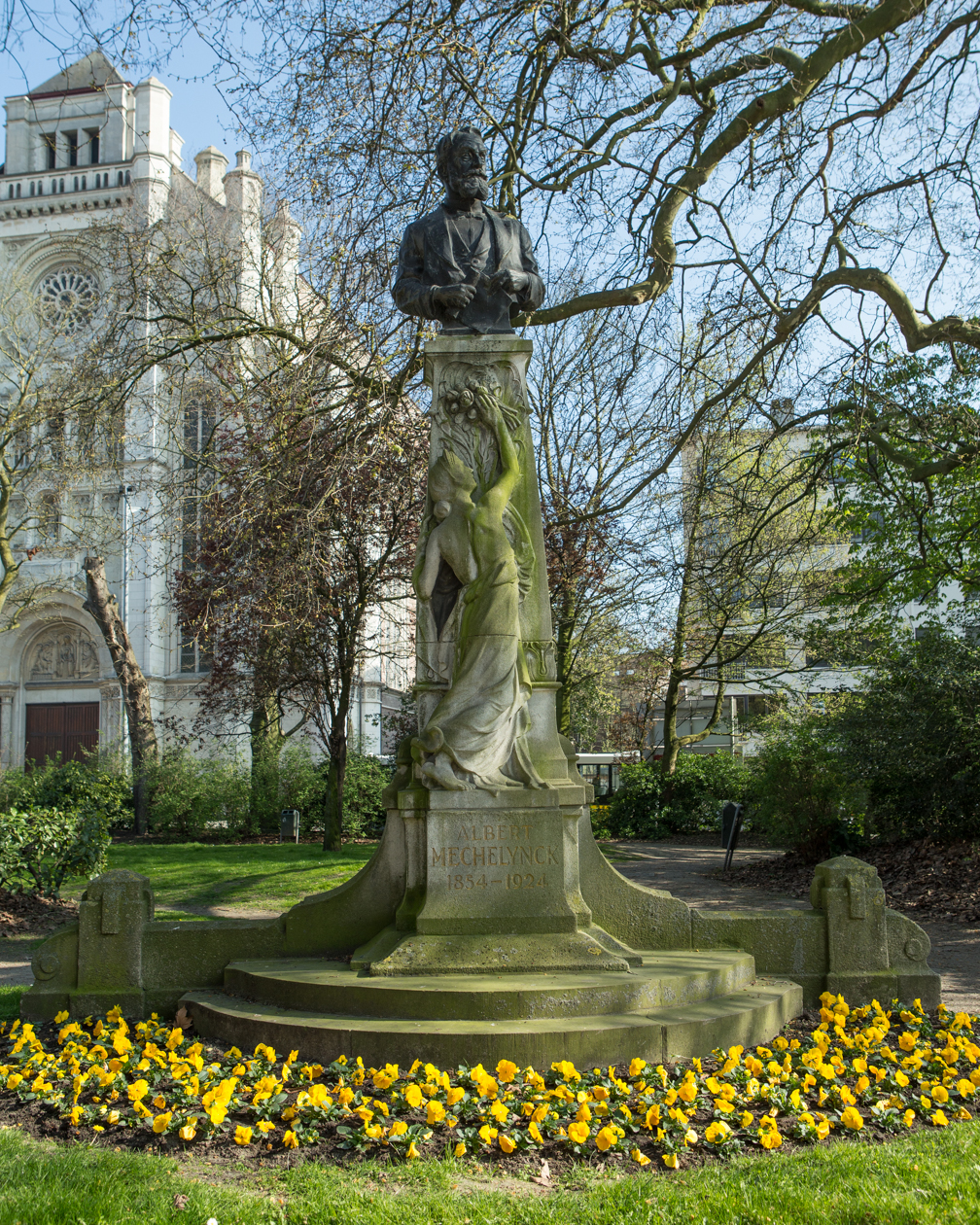
- Statue of Albert Mechelynck in Ghent
- Born: Albert Josse Louis Mechelynck; 28 December 1854; Ghent, Belgium
- Died: 9 March 1924 (aged 69)
- Occupations: politician, lawyer

Albert Josse Louis Mechelynck (Ghent, 28 December 1854 – 9 March 1924) was a Belgian liberal politician. He was a son of Louis Mechelynck and Pauline Delehaye, daughter of the former mayor of Ghent, Judocus Delehaye. He went to school at the Koninklijk Atheneum at the Ottogracht and studied law at the University of Ghent, where he graduated in 1876.

Mechelynck worked as a lawyer and became a member of the Provincial Council (1884–1904) of East Flanders. He was also as a liberal member of parliament for the district Gent-Eeklo (1904–1924), and President of the Liberal Party from 1920 until 1921. On 7 June 1925 a statue, made by Hippolyte Leroy, was inaugurated on the Sint-Annaplein in Ghent.

== Sources ==
- Albert Mechelynck (Dutch)

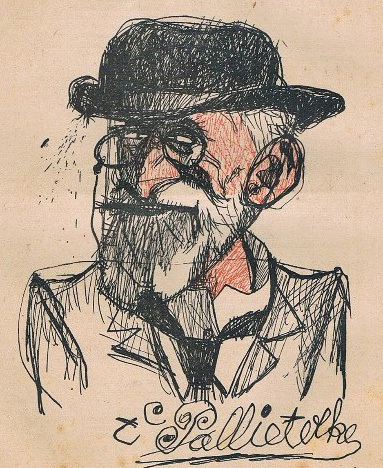
Albert Menchelynck (Jos De Swert, 1923)
