= Liberalism in Belgium =

This article gives an overview of liberalism in Belgium. Liberalism was a dominant force since Belgian independence from the Netherlands. It is limited to liberal parties with substantial support, as evidenced by having had representation in the parliament. The sign ⇒ denotes another party in that scheme. For inclusion in this scheme, it is not necessary for parties to label themselves as liberal.

== History ==
Since 1972 the traditional liberal current is divided in parties for each language. In Flanders the liberal Flemish Liberals and Democrats (Vlaamse Liberalen en Democraten, member LI, ELDR), comprising both market and left of center liberals, is one of the dominant parties. Smaller liberal parties are Spirit, allied with the social democrats, and Vivant, allied to the VLD. In the French-speaking part of the country the nowadays center liberal Reformist Movement (Mouvement Réformateur, member LI, ELDR) is one of the major parties. Affiliated with this party is the German-speaking Party for Freedom and Progress (Partei für Freiheit und Fortschritt).

=== Liberal Party/Party for Freedom and Progress ===
- 1846: Liberals formed the Liberal Party (Parti Libéral)
- 1887: A radical faction seceded as the ⇒ Progressive Party
- 1900: The ⇒ Progressive Party rejoined the party
- The party name gradually included the Dutch version Liberale Partij (LP/PL)
- 1961: The LP/PL is reorganised into Party for Freedom and Progress (Partij voor Vrijheid en Vooruitgang/Parti pour la Liberté et le Progrès) (PVV/PLP)
- 1972: The PVV/PLP fell apart in three parties with the same name in the three state languages (French, Dutch and German)

=== Progressive Party ===
- 1887: A radical faction of the ⇒ Liberal Party formed the Progressive Party (Parti Progressiste)
  - 1900: The PP merged into the ⇒ Liberal Party

=== (Flemish) Party for Freedom and Progress/Flemish Liberals and Democrats ===
- 1972: The Flemish section of the ⇒ PVV/PLP formed the Party for Freedom and Progress (Partij voor Vrijheid en Vooruitgang)
- 1992: The PVV is reorganised into the Flemish Liberals and Democrats (Vlaamse Liberalen en Democraten or VLD)
- 2007: VLD is regorganised into the Open Flemish Liberals and Democrats (Open Vlaamse Liberalen en Democraten, or open vld)

=== (Francophone) Party for Freedom and Progress/Liberal Reformist Party ===
- 1972: The francophone section of the ⇒ PVV/PLP became the Party for Freedom and Progress (Parti pour la Liberté et le Progrès)
- 1973: The Brussels section of the PLP formed the ⇒ Liberal Party
- 1976: The PLP merged with a faction of the Walloon Rally (Rassemblement Wallon) into the Party for Reforms and Freedom of Wallonia (Parti pour les Réformes et la Liberté de Wallonie)
- 1979: The party merged with the ⇒ Liberal Party into the Reformist Liberal Party (Parti Réformateur Libéral)
- 2002: The PRL is reorganised into the present-day Reformist Movement (Mouvement Réformateur or MR)

=== (Brussels) Liberal Party ===
- 1973: The Brussels section of the ⇒ PLP formed the Liberal Party (Parti Libéral)
- 1979: The Liberal Party merged into the ⇒ Liberal Reform Party

=== (German speaking) Party for Freedom and Progress ===
- 1976: The German-speaking section of the ⇒ PLP became the present-day Party for Freedom and Progress (Partei für Freiheit und Fortschritt)
- 2002: The PFF became affiliated to the ⇒ Reformist Movement
- 2023: The PFP is renamed into Perspectives. Freedom. Progress. (Perspektiven. Freiheit. Fortschritt.)

=== Libertine party during the 1990s ===
- 1991: ROSSEM was founded around Jean-Pierre Van Rossem.
- 1994: ROSSEM collapsed.
- 1995: A group centered around Roland Duchâtelet splits from ROSSEM and found BANAAN.
- 1995: A group centered around Jan Decorte splits from ROSSEM and found HOERA, which vanishes in the same year.
- 1997: BANAAN merges into Vivant (social-liberalism).
- 2004: Vivant becomes cartel partner of the VLD.
- 2007: Flemish Vivant gets absorbed into ⇒ Open Vld and becomes de facto a German-speaking party.
- 2009: ROSSEM is re-founded under the new full name Party of the Future.
- 2014: ROSSEM is renamed into Anderz.
- 2014: Anderz dissolves.

=== Right-liberal parties ===
- Liberal Appeal (2002–2007), cartel partner of the VLD; merged into ⇒ Open Vld.
- Veilig Blauw (Safe Blue), local party, defunct.
- Verstandig Rechts (Smart Right), local party, defunct, led by Willy Vermeulen.
- VLOTT (2006–2012), cartel partner of the Vlaams Belang.
- List Dedecker (populist right-liberalism) founded in 2007.
- Libéral Démocrate, local party led by Rudy Aernoudt, cartel partner of the MR.
- People's Party, far-right liberal party (2009–2019), founded by Rudy Aernoudt and Mischaël Modrikamen, merged into ⇒ Chez Nous.
- Liberal Democrats, founded in 2019 in inspiration by New Flemish Alliance.

=== Other liberal parties formed in the 2000s ===
- FlemishProgressives (left-liberalism), cartel partner of the Different Socialist Party.

== Liberal leaders ==
- Parti Libéral
  - Charles Rogier
  - Walthère Frère-Orban (1812-1896), wrote the first charter of the liberal party
  - Paul Janson
  - Paul Hymans
  - Paul-Emile Janson
- Mouvement Réformateur
  - Charles Michel
  - Sophie Wilmès
- Vlaamse Liberalen en Democraten
  - Guy Verhofstadt
  - Alexander De Croo

== Liberal thinkers ==
In the Contributions to liberal theory the following Belgian thinkers are included:

- Dirk Verhofstadt (born 1955)
- Boudewijn Bouckaert

== See also ==
- Liberal Archive
- History of Belgium
- Politics of Belgium
- List of political parties in Belgium
