= Adolf Daens =

Flemish Catholic priest (1839–1907)

Father Adolf Daens
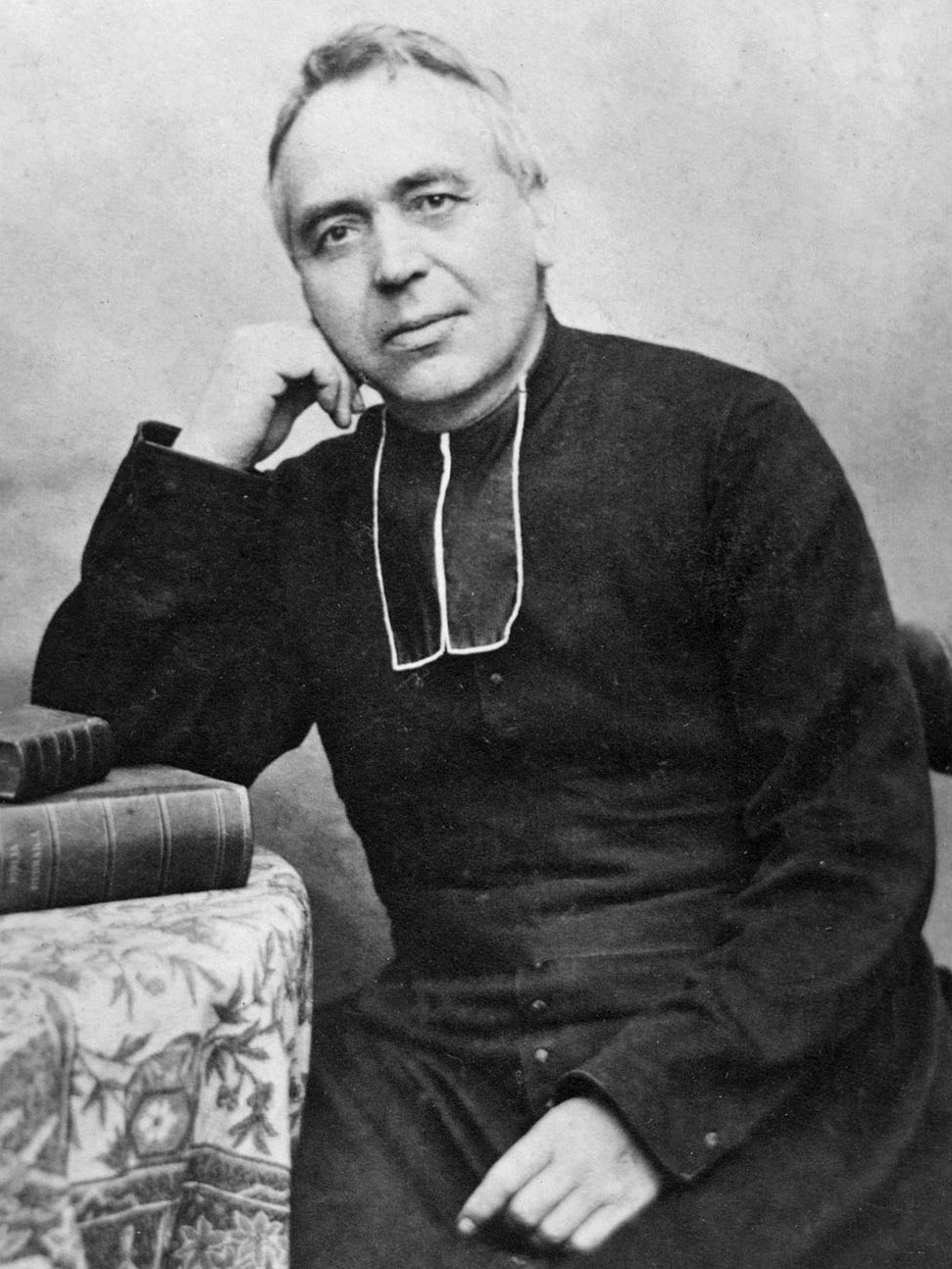
- Born: 18 December 1839; Aalst
- Died: 14 June 1907 (aged 67); Aalst
- Occupations: Priest, politician
- Political party: Christene Volkspartij
- Movement: Flemish Movement, labour movement
- Relatives: Pieter Daens (brother)

Augustin Adolphe "Adolf" Daens (18 December 1839 – 14 June 1907) was a Flemish Catholic priest and politician who advocated for labor rights in Belgium. Daens was a Jesuit from 1859 to 1871, but is especially known for his socio-political involvement after he joined the diocesan clergy. He created the Daensist movement from which the Christene Volkspartij party was created in 1893, after being inspired by Leo XIII's encyclical Rerum novarum. The Christene Volkspartij forced the radicalisation and democratisation of the Catholic party.

== Biography ==
Daens was a Flemish (Note: Most sources refer to him as Flemish, although some call him Belgian.) priest from Aalst. He became a Jesuit in 1858, but left the Society of Jesus in 1871, and became a priest two years later. He is especially known for his socio-political involvement after he joined the diocesan clergy. He created the "Daensist movement" from which originated in 1893 the Christene Volkspartij inspired by Leo XIII's encyclical Rerum novarum. The Christene Volkspartij forced the radicalisation and democratisation of the mainstream Catholic Party.

Daens was elected member of the Belgian parliament in 1894. Rightist groups in the Catholic Church obtained his condemnation by his bishop (1898), which did not prevent him from being reelected M.P. (1902–1906). He contributed much to the growing social awareness among Catholics in Belgium, and is a major figure of the Flemish movement as well as in the history of Belgian trade unions. He was suspended by his bishop Antoon Stillemans. He died in Aalst.

== Legacy ==
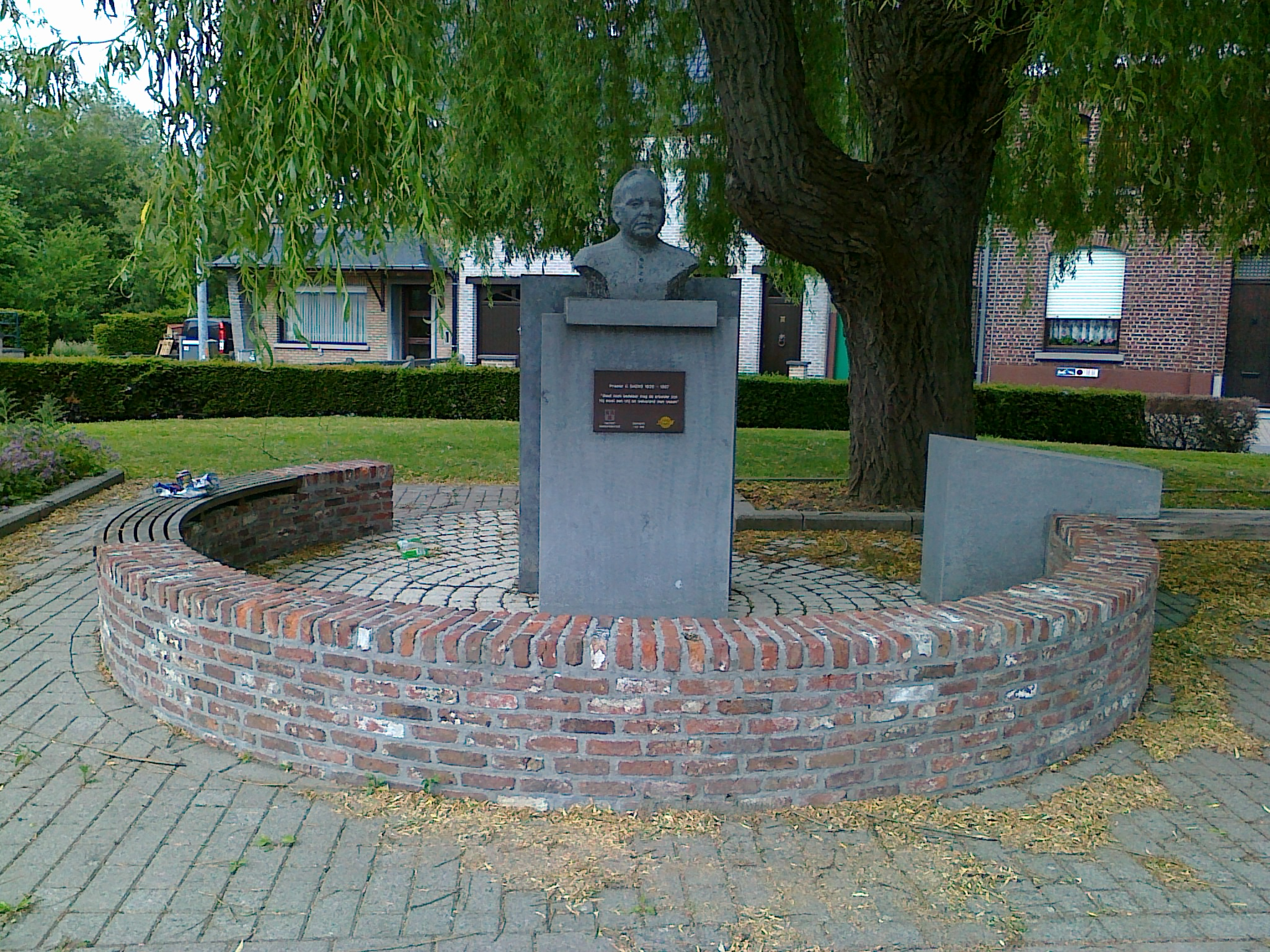
Statue of Priest Daens in Haaltert in East Flanders.

In 1971, Louis Paul Boon published the novel Daens (full title: Pieter Daens of hoe in de negentiende eeuw de arbeiders van Aalst vochten tegen armoede en onrecht, i.e., "Pieter Daens or How the workers of Aalst fought poverty and injustice in the 19th century") in which Adolf's brother Pieter Daens is the narrator. This book served as basis for a theatre adaptation for Nederlands Toneel Ghent by Frans Redant and Walter Moeremans (1979) and Stijn Coninx's film Daens in 1992 (with Jan Decleir as Adolf Daens).

In 2005, he ended fifth place in the Flemish version of the election of De Grootste Belg ("The Greatest Belgian").

A dramatised musical based on the Coninx film, and starring Lucas Van Den Eynde, Jo De Meyere, Jelle Cleymans and Free Souffriau, ran in Antwerp from October 2008 to February 2009 to much critical acclaim.

== Rehabilitation ==
108 years after his death, on 6 June 2015, Daens finally received rehabilitation from the church side. Monsignor André-Joseph Léonard, Archbishop of Mechelen-Brussels, presided over the annual Mass in commemoration of this great citizen. Later that day he put flowers on his grave.

Among other things, he said, "I am here today for reparation. Unfortunately, Father Daens was not supported by the bishop and the archbishop. They did not help him but condemned him. Had they accompanied him, what an opportunity that would have been for the faith in this area. That is why I am here today as archbishop to restore Daens. Better late than never. In his struggle for the poor people, he has always maintained his faith and has remained true to the teachings of the Church. The priest waged a good fight for the workers, who were shamefully exploited. They were exposed to the abuses of their bosses and to the arrogance of their representatives, who despised their language - Flemish."

== See also ==
- Charles Woeste
