= Jane Brigode =

Belgian politician

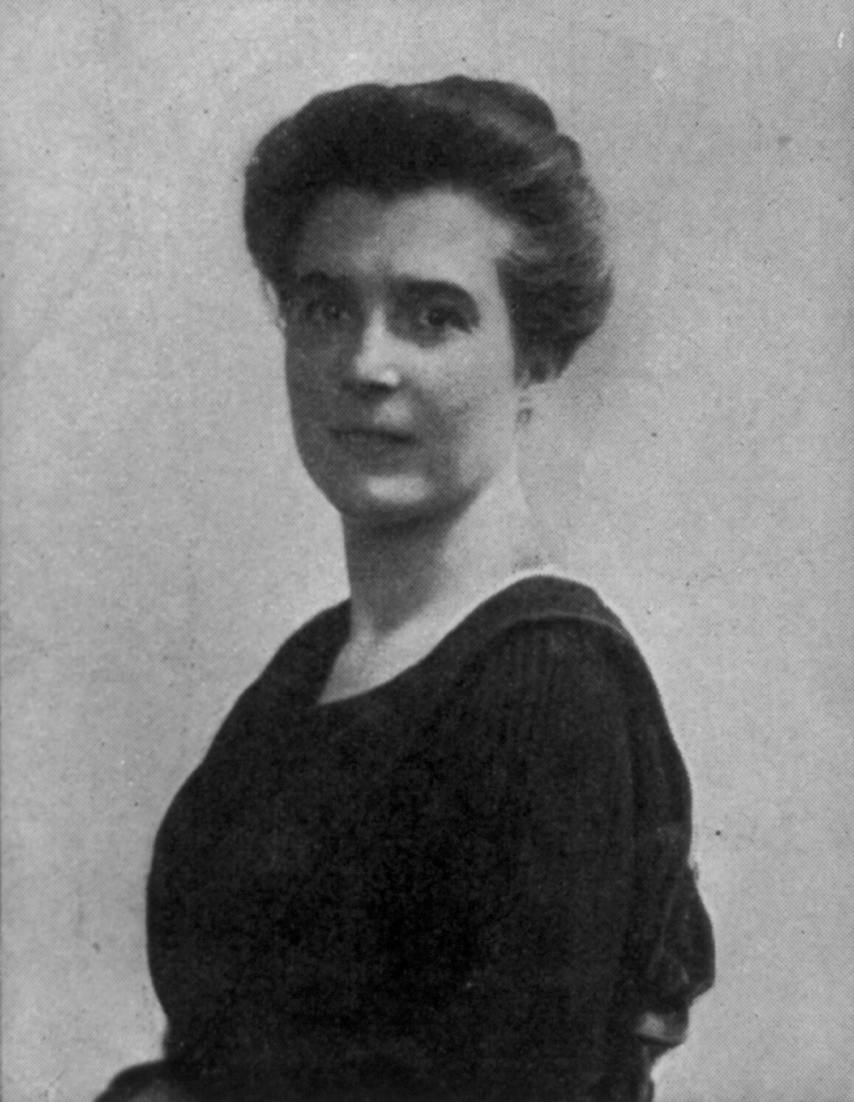
- portrait, c. 1910
- Born: Jane Ouwerx; 30 May 1870; Rummen, Belgium
- Died: 3 May 1952 (aged 81); Forest, Belgium
- Occupation: politician

Jane Brigode (born Jane Ouwerx; 30 May 1870 – 3 May 1952) was a Belgian liberal and politician. From 1940 until 1945 she was co-president of the Liberal Party. In 1921, she and Marthe Boël founded the Union des femmes libérales de l’arrondissement de Bruxelles and in 1923 they founded, together with Alice De Keyser-Buysse, the National Federation of Liberal Women.

== Honours ==
- Knight in the Order of Leopold.
- Officer in the Order of Leopold II.

== Sources ==
- Presidents of the Belgian liberal party
- Jane Brigode
