= Księży Młyn (Łódź) =

Industrial area in Łódź, Poland

Coordinates: 51°45′21″N 19°28′55″E

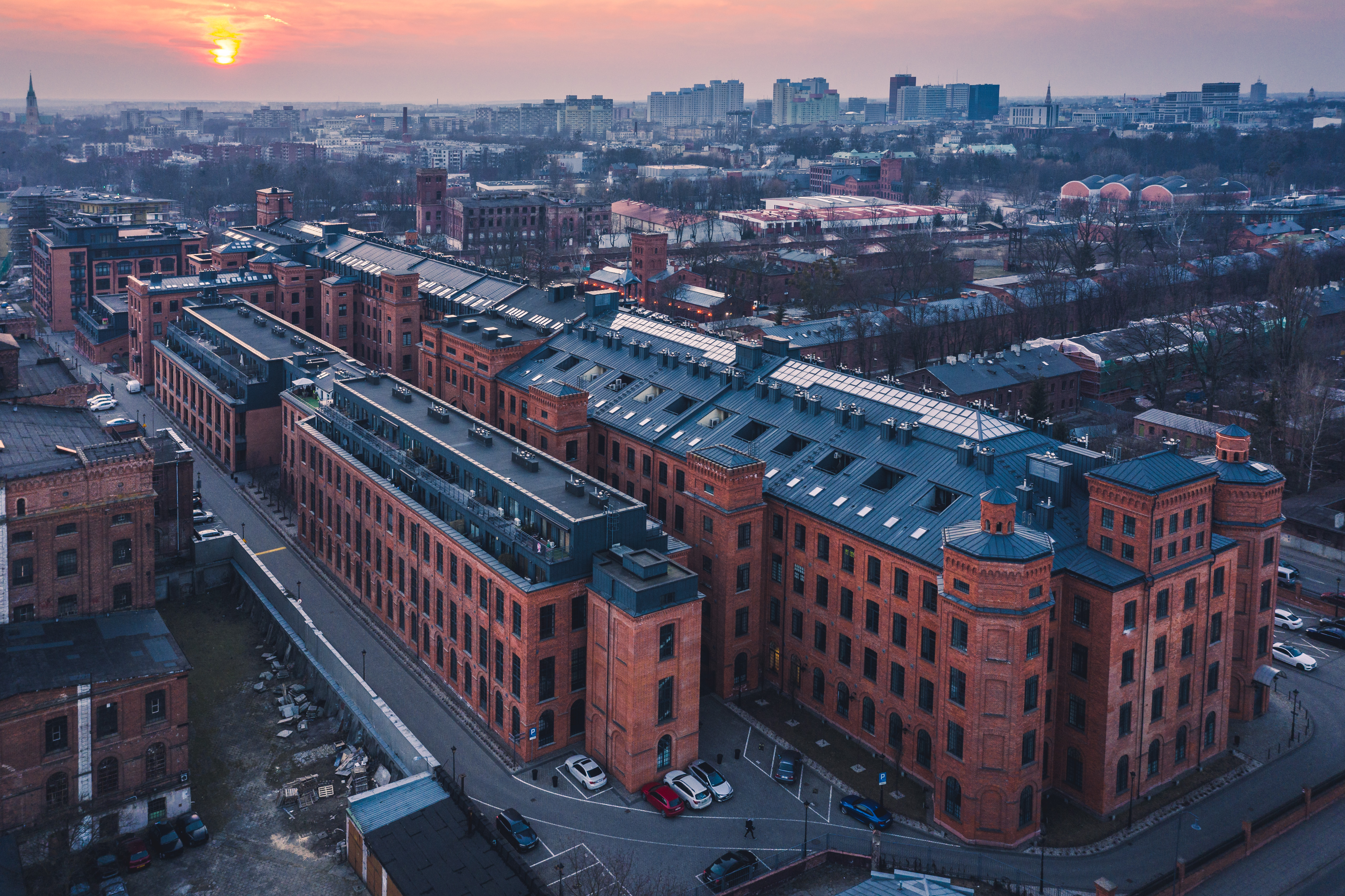
Contemporary view of Księży Młyn, 2021

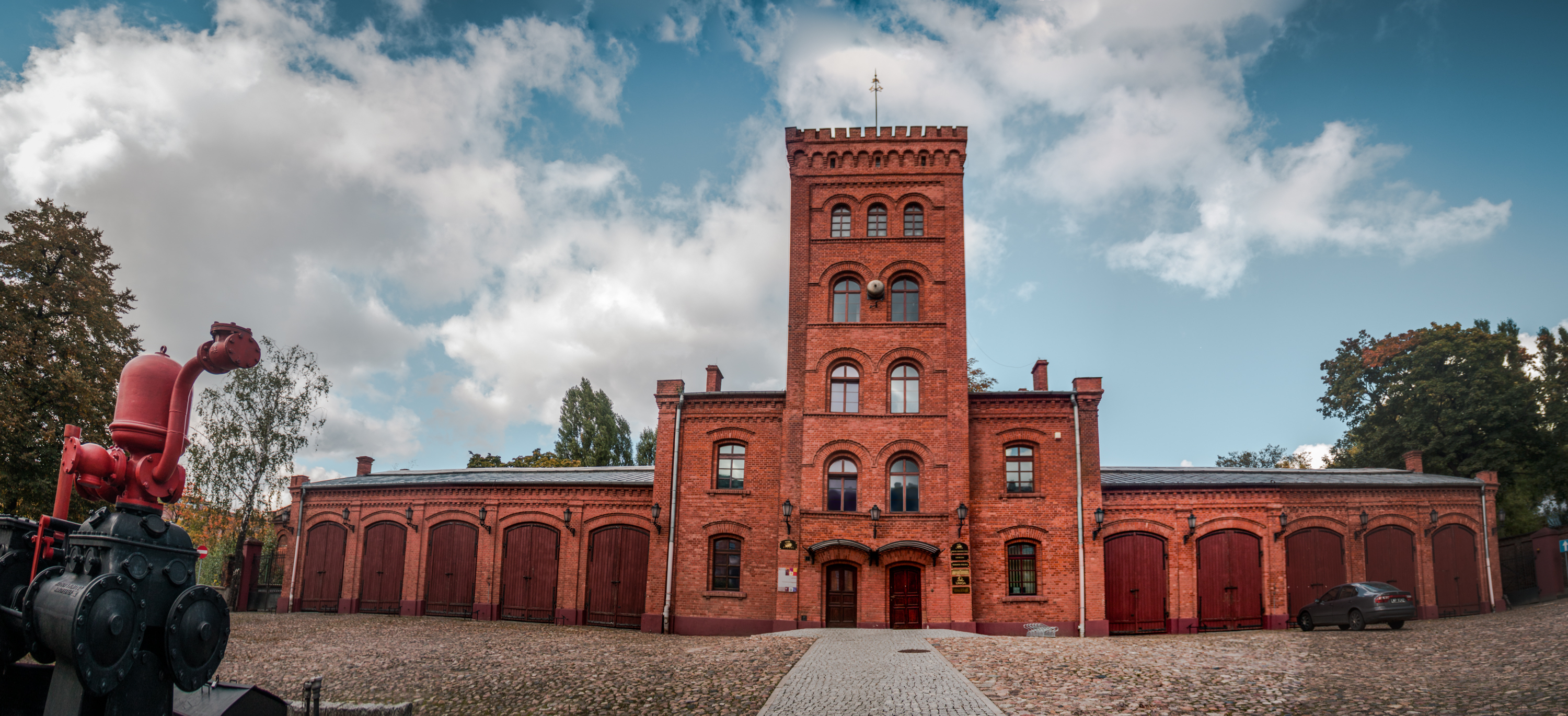
A private factory fire station

Księży Młyn (English: Priest's Mill, Polish pronunciation: [ksiɛ̃ʐɨ mwɨn]) is an area in the southern central part of the city of Łódź located in central Poland which consists of a group of textile factories (mainly cotton spinning mills) and associated facilities, built in Łódź since 1824. Since the first decade of the 21st century the area undergoes major renovation and contains mixed-use development of offices and housing.

== History ==
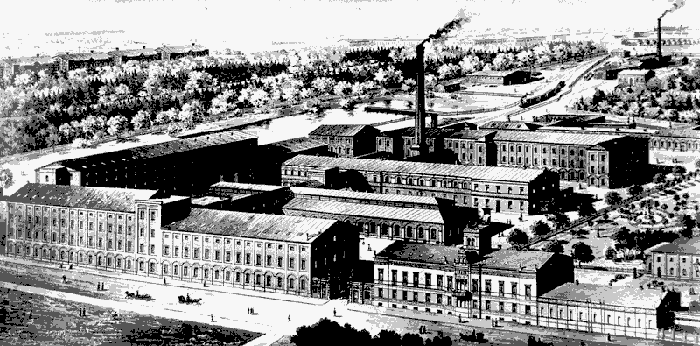
Księży Młyn factories in the 19th century

This complex was established on the site of a former mill settlement, belonging to the Łódź priest, mentioned in 1428 and 1521. There was also a village administrator's mill, later called the village head, erected at the same time, a short distance from the presbytery, in the upper course of the Jasień river, a right tributary Ner. By order of the authorities of 21 November 1823, the mills of Wójtowski, Księży and Lamus passed under the management of the municipal commune with the intention of using them for industrial purposes, in accordance with the rules established on 30 January 1821 by the government administration of the Kingdom of Poland.

The first to build a workshop there was Krystian Wendisch (Christian Friedrich Wendisch) from Chemnitz in Saxony, opening a large spinning mill (1827–1830), Karol Fryderyk Moes, and then after his death in 1863 Teodor Krusche, son of the Benjamin factory manufacturer Benjamin Krusche. A fire in 1870 interrupted his production activities. In the same year, Karol Wilhelm Scheibler, an entrepreneur dynamically developing his cotton factory at the Water Market in Łódź, bought the burned factory and the entire estate of Księży Młyn and Wójtowski Młyn.

The first spinning mill of Karol Scheibler (originating from a German family, which with a Belgian passport from Monschau arrived in Łódź via Ozorków in 1854), with a 40 HP steam engine, was built at the Water Market (today Plac Zwycięstwa) next to the Źródliska Park in 1855. In the following years expansion of the enterprise in this region to the form of factory and residential buildings, being the first planned of this type in Łódź. The whole in the first stage of development was a kind of jurydyka - an enclave on urban land, not subject to municipal authorities.

Starting from the 1870s, another Scheibler factory complex began to grow - on an unprecedented scale - "Księży Młyn" (according to the design by Hilary Majewski - although this attribute raises serious doubts), with the largest cotton spinning building in Łódź ( 207 m long), a housing estate for workers, residential houses Families, the so-called factory shop consumer, fire brigade, hospital, school, palace complex and park with a pond. Currently, this compact residential and industrial district, which is an unusual "city in the city", is one of the most interesting industrial monuments in the world. The factory complex at Księży Młyn - also known as Pfaffendorf in German - is the first assumption on this scale, later unsurpassed, assuming the characteristic layout for Łódź: a factory - a residence - a housing estate. This is one of the best implementations of this kind, not only in Poland, but also in Europe. As a complex, it has been entered in the register of monuments, and efforts have been made for several years to make it a UNESCO World Heritage Site.

Scheibler's enterprise (the largest among textile companies in Congress Poland) covered almost the entire zone of water and factory possessions, stretching from Piotrkowska Street. to the border of Widzew district (to the current Konstytucji St.). The total area of these areas was over 500ha, which constituted about 14% of the then city territory. The whole complex was distinguished not only by its modern production, but also by its excellent spatial organization at that time. All factory facilities, with a total capacity of over 1 million m^{3}, were the first in Łódź to be connected by a system of railway sidings approx. 5 km long from the factory-Łódź railway line (launched on 17 November 1865).

Scheibler, in order to strengthen the bond between workers and the enterprise, built a whole series of twin workers' houses around 1865 on the north side of the Water Market, in the 1870s next to the spinning mill at Księży Mill, at the end of the 19th century at Emilii Street (today Tymienieckiego Street) and at the beginning of the 20th century along Przędzalniana Street. The factory estate at Księży Młyn was particularly expanded. Today it is one of the most valuable architectural and urban monuments in Łódź.

The entire industrial complex was supplemented with palace residences: at the Water Market (1865) - the Palace of the Scheibler family, now the Museum of Cinematography in Łódź, at Piotrkowska Street in the vicinity of the Bielnik Market Square - currently occupied by the Lodz University of Technology and at the corner of Przędzalniana and Emilia streets (1875) - currently the Residence Księży Młyn, a branch of the Art Museum). The latter was occupied by Scheibler's son-in-law, Edward Herbst with his wife Matilda.

In 1921, the Scheibler factory merged with the textile factory of Ludwig Grohman (founded in 1842 by Traugott Grohmann, father of Ludwig). As a result, the largest textile industry enterprise in Poland in the early 1920s (United Scoibler's and L. Grohman's Zakłady Włókiennicze, SA in Łódź) was created.
