= Pierre Van Humbeeck =

- Born: Pierre Edouard Van Humbeeck; 17 May 1829; Brussels, Belgium
- Died: 5 July 1890 (aged 61); Brussels, Belgium
- Occupation: politician

Pierre Edouard Van Humbeeck (Brussels, 17 May 1829-Brussels, 5 July 1890) was a Belgian lawyer and liberal politician. He was a member of the city council of Brussels, the Belgian parliament and minister.

He was the first Belgian minister of education.

== See also ==
- Liberal Party

== Sources ==
- Liberal Archive
