= Liberal Archive (Belgium) =

Archive in Belgium

- Liberaal Archief
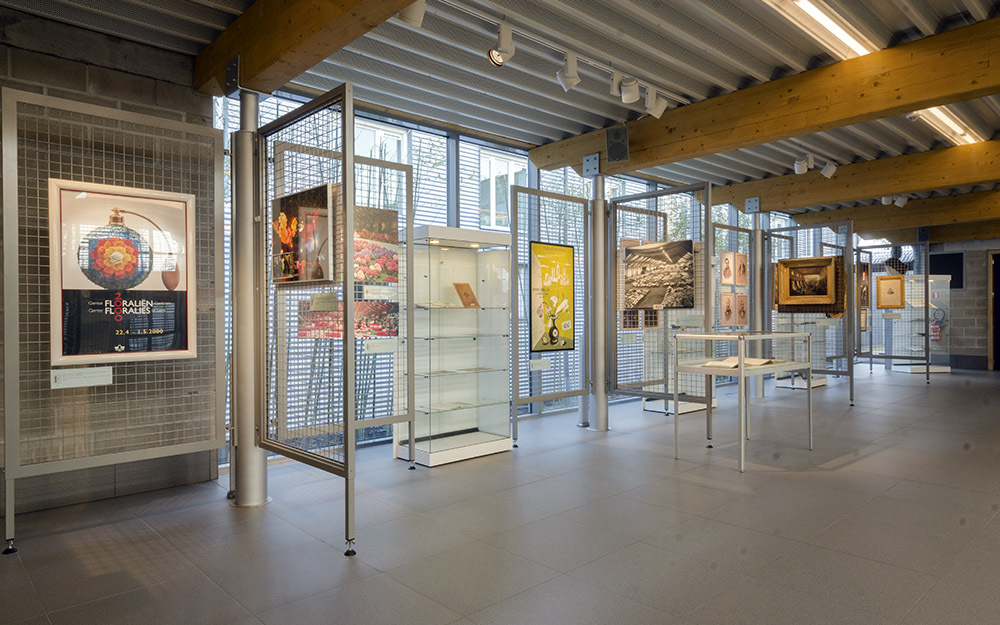
- Items on display at the archive
- Interactive map of Liberal Archive
- 51°02′27″N 3°43′34″E
- Alternative name: Liberas
- Location: 23 Kramersplein, Ghent, East Flanders, Belgium
- Established: 1982
- Affiliation: ODIS
- Director: Peter Laroy
- Period covered: 1800-present
- Website: liberas.eu/nl

The Liberal Archive (Flemish: Liberaal Archief), located in Ghent, is the central archive of the Belgian liberal organizations, such as the liberal party (Flemish Liberals and Democrats and Reformist Movement), the Willemsfonds, the Liberaal Vlaams Verbond and the liberal young guards/Pvv-Jongeren.

The Liberal Archive was founded in Ghent in 1982 and was recognised by the Flemish Community by a decree on 9 July 2002.

== See also ==
- Contributions to liberal theory
- Liberalism
- Liberalism in Belgium
- Liberalism worldwide
- National and Provincial State Archives

== Sources ==
- Erfgoeddag in het Liberaal Archief (in Dutch)
- ODIS intermediaire structuren in Vlaanderen 19e-20e eeuw (in Dutch)
