= Liberal Party (Belgium) =

Former Belgian political party

Liberal Party French: Parti libéral Dutch: Liberale Partij
- Historical presidents: Albert Mechelynck (first); Omer Vanaudenhove (last)
- Founded: 1846
- Dissolved: 1961
- Succeeded by: Party for Freedom and Progress
- Headquarters: Brussels, Belgium
- Trade Union's wing: General Confederation of Liberal Trade Unions of Belgium
- Ideology: Liberalism; Classical liberalism Anti-clericalism
- Political position: Centre-left to left-wing
- International affiliation: Liberal International (from 1947)
- Colours: Blue

The Liberal Party (Dutch: Liberale Partij, pronounced [libəˈraːlə pɑrˈtɛi]; French: Parti libéral, pronounced [paʁti libeʁal]) was a Belgian political party that existed from 1846 until 1961, when it became the Party for Freedom and Progress, Partij voor Vrijheid en Vooruitgang/Parti de la Liberté et du Progrès or PVV-PLP, under the leadership of Omer Vanaudenhove.

== History ==
The Liberal Party was founded in 1846 and as such was the first political party of Belgium. Walthère Frère-Orban wrote the first charter for the new party.

The Liberal Party had a clear victory in the 1848 elections, following lower tax requirements that benefited urban populations, where liberals were stronger. The Liberal Party remained in dominant position for the most part of the period from 1848 until 1884, where it lost to Catholics due to the First School War. The Liberal Party suffered even more losses in the next elections, most notable in the 1894 elections, the first ones with universal suffrage. However, they made a comeback in 1900 upon the introduction of proportional representation.

From 1887 until 1900, the Progressive Party (French: Parti Progressiste, Dutch: Progressieve Partij) existed as a separate progressive Liberal party.

For much of the party’s history, Belgian Liberals advocated progressive measures such as health and safety provisions, a minimum wage, cheap housing, and improvements in social security.

== Presidents ==
- 1920 - 1921 : Albert Mechelynck
- 1924 - 1926 : Edouard Pécher
- 1927 - 1933 : Albert Devèze
- 1933 - 1934 : Octave Dierckx
- 1935 - 1936 : Léon Dens
- 1936 - 1937 : Victor de Laveleye
- 1937 - 1940 : Emile Coulonvaux
- 1940 - 1945 : Jane Brigode and Fernand Demets (co-presidency)
- 1945 - 1953 : Roger Motz
- 1953 - 1954 : Henri Liebaert
- 1954 - 1958 : Maurice Destenay
- 1958 - 1961 : Roger Motz
- 1961 : Omer Vanaudenhove

== Notable members ==
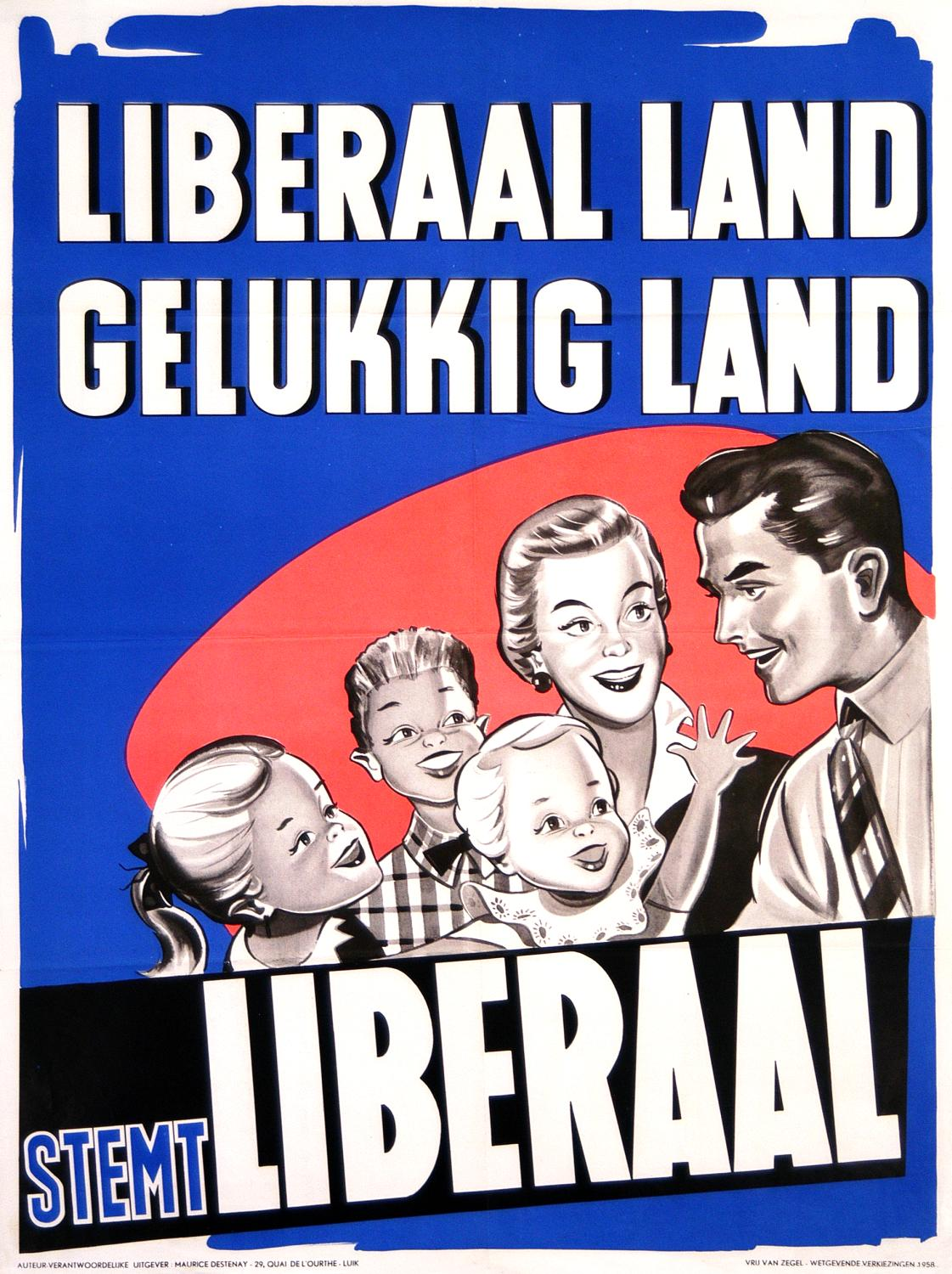
Election poster for the 1958 elections. The caption reads "Liberal Country, Happy Country".

- Jules Bara
- Gustave Boël (1837-1912), industrialist
- François Bailleux first party secretary
- Charles Buls, mayor of Brussels (1881-1899)
- Jacques Coghen, (1791-1858), second Minister of Finance of Belgium
- Eugène Defacqz
- François-Philippe de Haussy, (1789-1869), first governor of the National Bank of Belgium
- Constant de Kerchove de Denterghem
- Louis Franck (1868–1937), a leading Flemish liberal politician.
- Walthère Frère-Orban, (1812–1896), wrote the first charter of the liberal party.
- Charles Graux
- Julius Hoste Jr. (1884–1954), businessman and leading Flemish liberal politician.
- Paul Hymans, first President of the League of Nations
- Paul Janson
- Paul-Émile Janson
- Joseph Lebeau
- Albert Lilar
- Adolphe Max, mayor of Brussels (1909-1939)
- Eudore Pirmez
- Eugène Prévinaire, (1805-1877), second governor of the National Bank of Belgium.
- Jean Rey (1902-1983), President of the European Commission
- Charles Rogier
- Gustave Rolin-Jaequemyns
- Ernest Solvay (1838-1922), chemist, industrialist and philanthropist.
- Patrice Lumumba
- Henri Story (1897-1944)
- Herman Teirlinck (1879–1967), a famous Belgian writer.
- Pierre Van Humbeeck
- Jan Van Rijswijck
- Pierre-Théodore Verhaegen, founder of the Université libre de Bruxelles
- Raoul Warocqué

== See also ==
- Politics of Belgium
- Liberal Archive
- Liberalism in Belgium
- Progressive Party

== Sources ==
- Liberal Archive
- Th. Luykx, M. Platel, Politieke geschiedenis van België, 2 vol., Kluwer, 1985
- E. Witte, J. Craeybeckx, A. Meynen, Politieke geschiedenis van België, Standaard, 1997
