= Christene Volkspartij =

Defunct political party in Belgium

Christian People's Party Christene Volkspartij (CVP)
- Founder: Adolf Daens
- Founded: 15 April 1893, Okegem
- Ideology: Daensism: Christian democracy; Populism; Flemish interests
- Political position: Left-wing
- Religion: Catholicism
- Colors: Green

The Christene Volkspartij (English: Christian People's Party) was the first Belgian Christian Democratic political party. The party was founded in 1893 by the Belgian priest Adolf Daens, who was inspired by the papal encyclical Rerum novarum of Pope Leo XIII, issued in 1891.

== History ==
The inaugural meeting was organised in Okegem on 15 April 1893, and was attended by the founders of party, the self-styled Roelanders: Vanlangenhaeke, Van de Velde, De Backer, Lambrecht, Sterck, De Pelsmaecker and Pieter Daens, who was from nearby Aalst. Pieter Daens's brother priest Adolf Daens wrote the party programme which was adopted at the next meeting in July 1893.

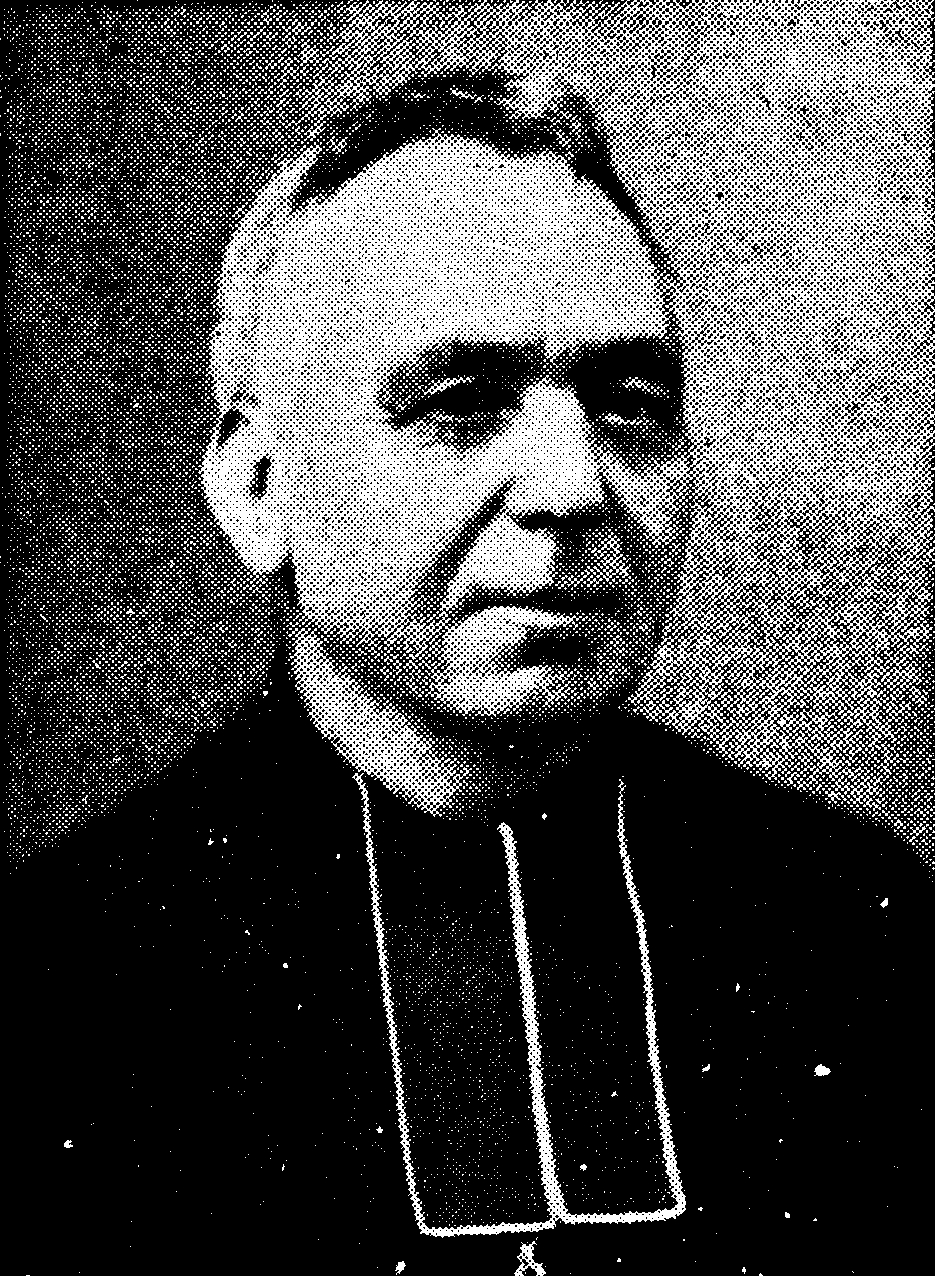
Adolf Daens, pictured in 1902

Adolf Daens founded the party as an alternative for socialism and the conservative Catholic Party. He emphasized the social problems of the time and linked them to the need for social facilities and also a Flemish political programme, aimed at creating a favourable political climate in Flanders.

His political movement had significant success in the region of Aalst, but was opposed by the (Catholic) elite, and by the Roman Catholic Church. In spite of all opposition the Christene Volkspartij succeeded in gaining representation in the Belgian parliament, with Adolf Daens as its foremost leader. In parliament Daens quickly got into conflict with the conservative Catholic leader Charles Woeste and tried to gain support from the Socialists. During the municipal elections of 1899 the Daensists even cooperated with the Socialists in Brussels. In the same year, Adolf Daens was removed from his office as a priest. When the Christene Volkspartij started to grow and threatened the political power of the Socialists, the latter withheld further cooperation.

After his political career, Daens lived in Aalst where he remained as leader of the movement until his death in June 1907. Daensism had a permanent influence in the arrondissement Aalst and created the foundations of Christian democracy in Belgium.

== See also ==
- Politics of Belgium
- PSC-CVP
- Graves de communi re
- Belgian Labour Party
