= 4th Army (France) =

- 4e armée
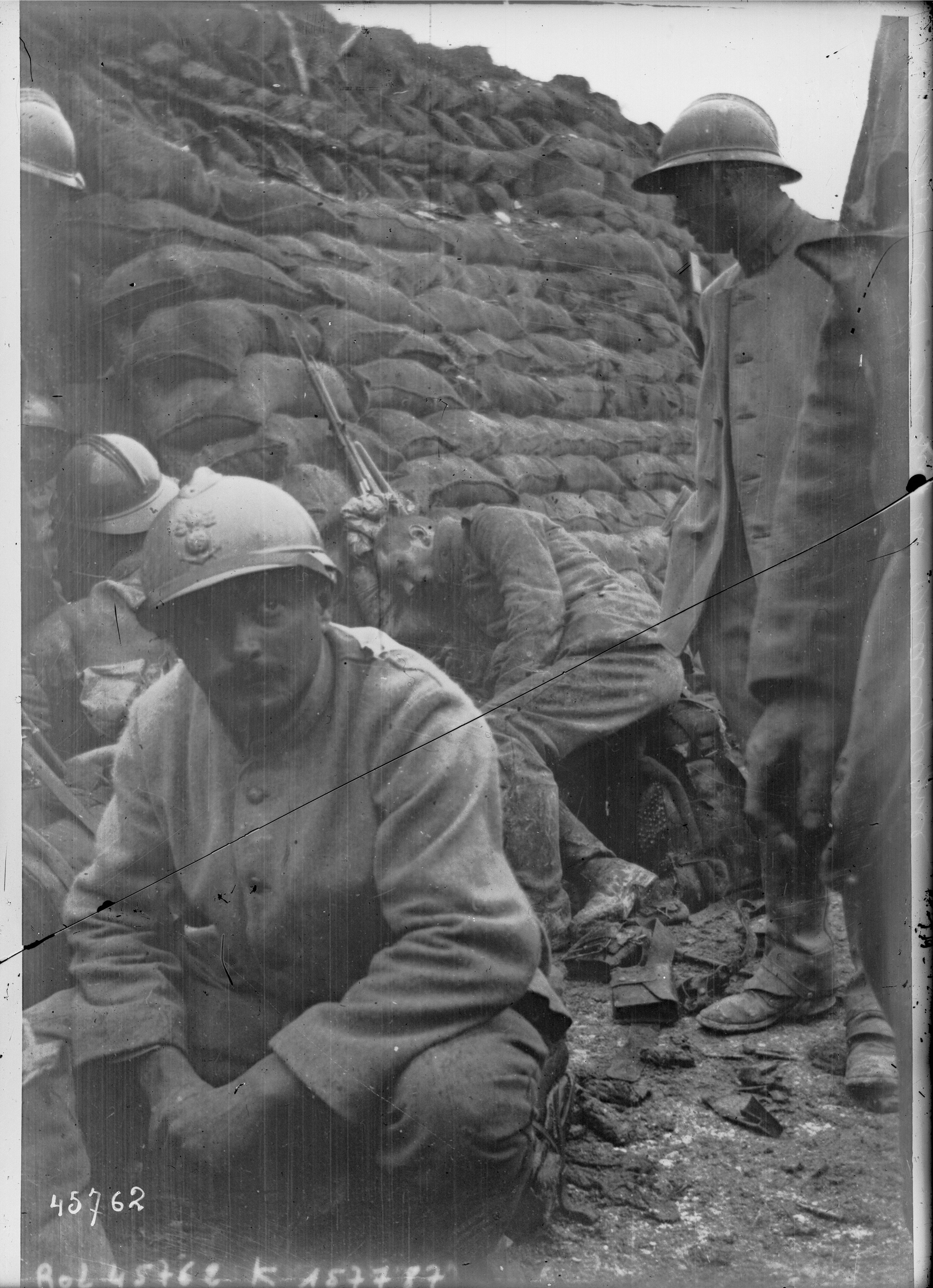
- Founded: 2 August 1914
- Country: France
- Branch: Army
- Type: Field Army
- Nickname: Army of Fontainebleau
- Engagements: First World War: 1914 – Battle of the Ardennes; 1914 – Battle of the Meuse; 1914 – Battle of the Marne (Battle of Vitry); 1914 – Battle of Champagne; 1915 – Second Battle of Champagne; 1917 – Battle of the Champagne Mountains; 1918 – Fourth Battle of Champagne; 1918 – Meuse–Argonne Offensive; 1918 – Battle of Chesne and Buzancy; Second World War

The Fourth Army (French: IVe Armée), nicknamed the "Army of Fontainebleau", was a unit of the French Army, which fought during World War I and World War II. It was one of five armies created and mobilized by the Grand Quartier Général when Plan XVII was launched in response to the German attack of August 1914.

== Commanders ==
=== World War I ===
==== Commanders ====
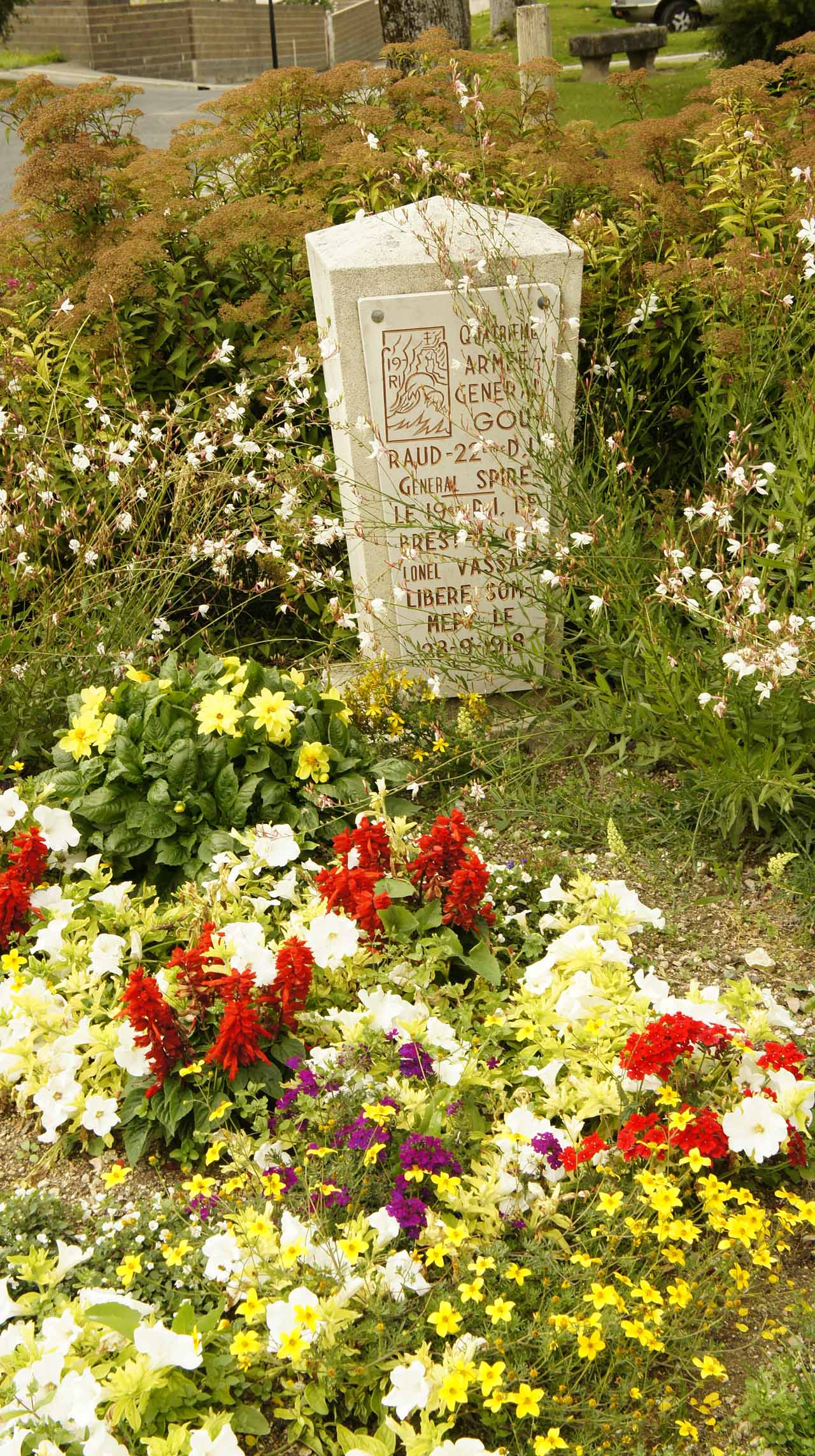
Tribute to the Fourth Army which liberated Sommepy-Tahure.

- General Fernand de Langle de Cary (2 August 1914 – 11 December 1915)
- General Henri Gouraud (11 December 1915 – 19 December 1916)
- General Émile Fayolle (19 December 1916 – 31 December 1916)
- General Pierre Roques (31 December 1916 – 23 March 1917)
- General François Anthoine (23 March 1917 – 15 June 1917)
- General Henri Gouraud (15 June 1917 – 8 October 1919)

==== Chief of staff ====
- General Paul Maistre (2 August – 12 September 1914)
- Colonel Alphonse Nudant (12 September – 21 November 1914)
- Colonel Gabriel Alexandre Paquette (21 November 1914 – 28 January 1916)
- Colonel Jean Degoutte (28 January – 3 August 1916)
- Colonel Vidalon (3 August 1916 – 7 January 1917)
- Lieutenant-Colonel Broussaud (7 January – 26 May 1917)
- Colonel Spire (26 May 1917 – 8 January 1918)
- Lieutenant-Colonel André-Gaston Prételat (8 January 1918 – ???)

=== World War II ===
==== Commanders ====
- General Édouard Réquin (2 September 1939 – 6 July 1940)

== First World War ==
=== Composition at mobilization ===
On mobilization in August 1914, the 4th Army was commanded by the French General de Langle de Cary. It comprised the 12th and 17th Corps, the Colonial Army Corps, and a cavalry division.

Chief of Staff: General Paul Maistre (replaced on 12 September 1914 by Colonel Alphonse Nudant, then on 21 November 1914 by Colonel Gabriel Alexandre Paquette);
Deputy Chief: Lieutenant-Colonel Dessens;
Head of 3rd Office: Commandant de La Fontaine;
Head of Aviation Services: Commandant Barès;
Head of Stages and Services: General Sentis.

The 1st echelon of staff from Paris arrived at Saint-Dizier on 5 August at 8:15 am; the 2nd echelon on 6 August at 9 p.m. from Fontainebleau.

=== 12th Army Corps (Limoges) ===
- 23rd Infantry Division (France) (Haute-Vienne, Charente, Creuse)
- 24th Infantry Division (France) (Dordogne, Corrèze)
- Infantry regiments (attached to the 12th Army Corps):
  - 300th Infantry Regiment (France) (Tulle)
  - 326th Infantry Regiment (France) (Brive)
- Cavalry (attached to the 12th Army Corps):
  - 21st Light Horse Regiment (4 squadrons) (Limoges)
- Artillery (attached to the 12th Army Corps):
  - 52nd Field Artillery Regiment (4 groups) (Angoulême)
  - 21st Field Artillery Regiment (France) (3 groups of 75) (Angoulême)
- Engineers (attached to the 12th Army Corps):
  - 6th Engineer Regiment (companies 12/3,12/4,12/16,12/21) (Angers)
- Others (attached to the 12th Army Corps):
  - 12th Squadron of the Military Crew Train
  - 12th section of staff and recruitment secretaries
  - 12th section of military nurses
  - 12th section of military administrative clerks and workers

==== 17th Army Corps (Toulouse) ====
- 33rd Infantry Division
- 34th Infantry Division (France)
- Infantry regiments (attached to the 17th Army Corps) :
  - 207th Infantry Regiment (France)
  - 209th Infantry Regiment (France)
- Cavalry (attached to the 17th Army Corps):
  - 9th Chasseur Regiment (France) (4 squadrons)
- Artillery (attached to the 17th Army Corps):
  - 57th Field Artillery Regiment (France) (4 groups)
- Engineers (attached to the 17th Army Corps):
  - 2nd Engineer Regiment (France) (companies 17/3,17/4,17/16,17/21)
- Others (attached to 17th Army Corps):
  - 17th Squadron of the Military Crew Train
  - 17th Section of Staff Secretaries and Recruitment
  - 17th Military Nurses Section
  - 17th section of military administrative clerks and workers

==== Colonial Army Corps ====
The Colonial Army Corps (CAC, formed in Paris) was commanded by General Jules Lefèvre (replaced on 22 January 1915, by General Henri Gouraud).

Chief of Staff: Colonel Puypéroux;
Deputy Chief of Staff: Lieutenant-Colonel Piquemal;
Artillery Commander: General Gautheron;
Engineer Commander: Colonel Dehoey.

==== 9th Cavalry Division ====
The 9th Cavalry Division (France) (from Tours) was formed from the 9th, 10th and 11th regions, and was commanded by general Jean de l'Espée.

- 1st Brigade of Cuirassiers (Tours), Colonel de Mitry

5th Cuirassiers Regiment (France) (Tours)
8th Cuirassiers Regiment (France) (Tours)

- 9th Dragoon Brigade (Nantes), General de Sailly

1st Dragoon Regiment (France) (Luçon)
3rd Dragoon Regiment (Nantes)

- 16th Dragoon Brigade, General Gombaud de Séréville.

24th Dragoon Regiment (France) (Rennes)
25th Dragoon Regiment (France) (Angers)

==== Army elements ====
Artillery:

- 2nd Artillery Regiment
- 1 group of 155 CTR

Engineering:

- Pontoon Company 24/1 of the 7th Engineer Regiment (France)
- Telegraph Sapper Company No.4
- Radio Detachment F

Aeronautical squadrons:

- Voisin: V 14, V 21

=== Changes during the war ===
When the arrival of the Americans in the conflict began, the troops that remained under French command (in the Fourth Army):

- 2nd Infantry Division,
- 36th Infantry Division,
- 42nd Infantry Division,
- 93rd Infantry Division.

=== History ===
==== World War One ====
The Fourth Army was one of five armies mobilized as part of Plan XVII in August 1914 after the declaration of war. Its strength on mobilization was 4,689 officers, 154,899 NCOs and men, and 58,491 horses organized into three corps of four infantry divisions, two colonial infantry divisions, and one cavalry division. In August 1914, it was concentrated, in reserve between Saint-Dizier and Bar-le-Duc in the Argonne Region.

==== The Outbreak of World War I ====
- On 2 August, the French Fourth Army was officially mobilized. From the 2nd to 14 August, the Fourth Army became concentrated in the south and west of the Argonne. From 8 August, the Fourth Army had coverage by the 2nd Army Corps and the 9th Cavalry Division from Mangiennes (3rd Army) to Mouzon (5th Army).

==== Battle of Frontiers ====
===== Battle of Ardennes =====
- On 21 August, the Fourth Army participated in an offensive in the general direction of Neufchâteau in coordination with the Third Army. Participating in the Battle of Ardennes, the French Fourth Army advanced to the Robelmont line, where the Third Army was located, Tintigny, Jamoigne, Chiny, Bertrix, Houdremont, and Revin where the 5th Army was located. After heavy fighting, they withdrew to the right bank of the Chiers. On the 24 and 26 August, they withdrew to the Meuse. From Sassey-sur-Meuse, the 3rd Army withdrew to Mézières.

===== Battle of Meuse =====
- On the 27 and 28 August, the Fourth Army participated in the Battle of the Meuse as part of a counter-attack on the Beaumont front in the town of Signy-l'Abbaye to prevent German troops from crossing the Meuse.
- 29 August – 6 September: Successive withdrawals: on the Buzancy line Attigny on 31 August; on the Arnes River (Suippe) on 1 September; on the Marne and as far as the front: Sermaize-les-Bains (3rd Army), Pargny-sur-Saulx, Écriennes, Courdemanges, Le Meix-Tiercelin (Foch commands army detachment formed on 29 August between the 4th and 5th Armies; becomes 9th Army on 5 September).

===== Battle of Marne =====
- From the 6th to 10 September, the Fourth Army engaged in the Battle of Marne (Battle of Vitry). They resisted the German thrust, fiercely fighting on the Marne front's left wing, located south of Sompuis, in conjunction with the 9th Army.

==== 1914 ====
- 10–15 September: pursuit of retreating German troops, up to the Varennes-en-Argonne line (3rd Army), Ville-sur-Tourbe, Sabot Wood (9th Army).
- 15–22 September: attempts to break the German front, then stabilization and organization of the positions reached.
- 22–23 September: loss of Varennes-en-Argonne.
- 26–29 September: violent German attacks in the Argonne. On 29 September, right limit in liaison with the 3rd Army at Le Four de Paris.
- 7 October: extension of the front to the left as far as Ferme des Marquises (5th Army) following the suppression of the 9th army.
- October–November: numerous German attacks in Argonne on Grurie wood, Bagatelle, Saint-Hubert and Four de Paris.
- 20 November: right limit (3rd Army) brought to the Aire river.

==== First Battle of Champagne ====
- December 1914 – March 1915: First Battle of Champagne, French offensives followed by German counter-attacks in the Perthes-lès-Hurlus region, Beauséjour Farm, Souain; capture of Perthes-lès-Hurlus and Fort Beauséjour.

==== 1915 ====
- 8 January: sector reduced to the right as far as Aisne (Oise) (3rd Army).
- 31 May: front reduced to the right as far as Massiges (3rd Army).
- 10 August: front reduced to the right as far as Sabot Wood (2nd Army introduced on the front).
- 25 September: engaged in the Second Battle of Champagne, capture of Navarin Farm; then organization and defense of conquered positions.

==== 1916 ====
- 5 January: as a result of the 2nd Army's withdrawal from the front, right limit (3rd Army) extended to the Aisne (Oise).
- 9 January: German attacks on Mont Têtu.
- 12 February: German attack in the Navarin farm area.
- 25 February: French attack in the Navarin farm area.
- 27 February: German counter-attack in the same area.
- 15 March: French attack in the same area.
- 16 May: German coup de main at Mount Têtu.
- 26 June: following the withdrawal of the 3rd Army, right limit brought to Le Four de Paris (2nd Army).

==== 1917 ====
- 22 March: right limit reduced to Ville-sur-Tourbe (2nd Army).
- 17 April – 16 July: Battle of the Champagne Mountains, offensive on the Aubérive front. Prosnes; capture of Aubérive, Mount Sans Nom, Mount Blond, Téton, Casque, Mount Haut and Mount Cornillet. Organization and defense of conquered positions.
- 10 May: right limit brought to Le Four de Paris (2nd Army).
- Late July and August: German attacks in the Monts region.

==== 1918 ====
- 6 February: right boundary brought back to Beaurain Wood (2nd Army).
- 29 March: left limit brought up to the Courcy cavalrymen (withdrawal of the 5th Army).
- 26–27 May: following the withdrawal of the 6th Army, some elements of the left of the 4th Army fall back slightly to the south in the area northwest of Reims.
- 29 May: left limit (5th Army) brought back to the Prunay area (introduction of the 5th Army) and on 31 May brought to Fort de la Pompelle.
- On 16 June 1918, on the orders of General Pershing, the United States' 42nd Division were attached to the Fourth Army and assigned under Henri Gouraud's command until the end of the war.
- 4 July: left boundary (5th Army), moved to Prunay; right boundary 2nd Army, moved to the Houyette ravine.

=== Second Battle of Marne ===
==== Fourth Battle of Champagne ====
- On 15 July, the German First and Third Army attacked the French Fourth Army east of Reims. At 11:00, the attack on the French Fourth Army was halted, while the simultaneous attack on the French Sixth Army, by the German Seventh and Ninth Armies, west of Reims, was successful.

15–18 July: Battle of Champagne, German offensive towards the Hand of Massiges at Prunay, halted in front of the French resistance position, after voluntary abandonment of the front lines (battle of Prosnes-Massiges

  - 16 July: right limit (2nd Army) brought back to Beaurain Wood.

==== The Continuation of Second Battle of Marne ====
- 18 July – end of July: during the Second Battle of the Marne, French counter-attacks and advances north of Souain, Prosnes and Beaumont-sur-Vesle. From the end of July, the reconquered positions are organized.
- 21 August: right limit (2nd Army) shifted to the northeast of Vienne-le-Château.
- On 22 September, the American Army replaced the French 2nd Army being on the right of the 4th Army.

=== Meuse-Argonne offensive ===
==== First phase (26 September – 4 October 1918) ====
- From 26 September to 16 October, the Fourth Army engaged in the Meuse–Argonne offensive, initially fighting in the Battle of Somme-Py, which lasted from 26 September to 4 October. Exploiting the confusion of the Germans, the French Fourth Army advanced to the Aisne.

==== Second phase ( 4–28 October 1918) ====
On the 8 and 9 October, working in coordination with I Corps, the French Fourth Army conducted a pincer attack that resulted in the German withdrawal. After the battle, the Fourth Army reorganized itself on the Termes front with the 1st American Army and in the Vouziers, Rethel region with the 5th Army. On 14 October, at the same time as the attack on the Hindenburg line, the French Fourth Army attacked on the left of the First American Army. From 16 to 20 October, there was a French offensive with heavy fighting in the Olizy, Vouziers region. On 18 October, there was a crossing of the Aisne towards Vouziers, and a creation of a bridgehead north of the Aisne. On 21 October, there was a strong German attack towards Terron-sur-Aisne.

==== Third phase (28 October – 11 November 1918) ====
- 1–6 November: Battle of Le Chesne and Buzancy, offensive in conjunction with the American Army towards Châtillon-sur-Bar and Le Chesne: crossing of the Ardennes canal, then organization of positions on the line: Le Chesne (American Army), Semuy, Rilly-aux-Oies.
- 6–11 November: thrust towards the Meuse, progression via Tourteron and Omont towards the Meuse. Front reached at armistice: Noyers-Pont-Maugis (American Army), Sedan, course of the Meuse, Mézières (liaison with the 5th Army).

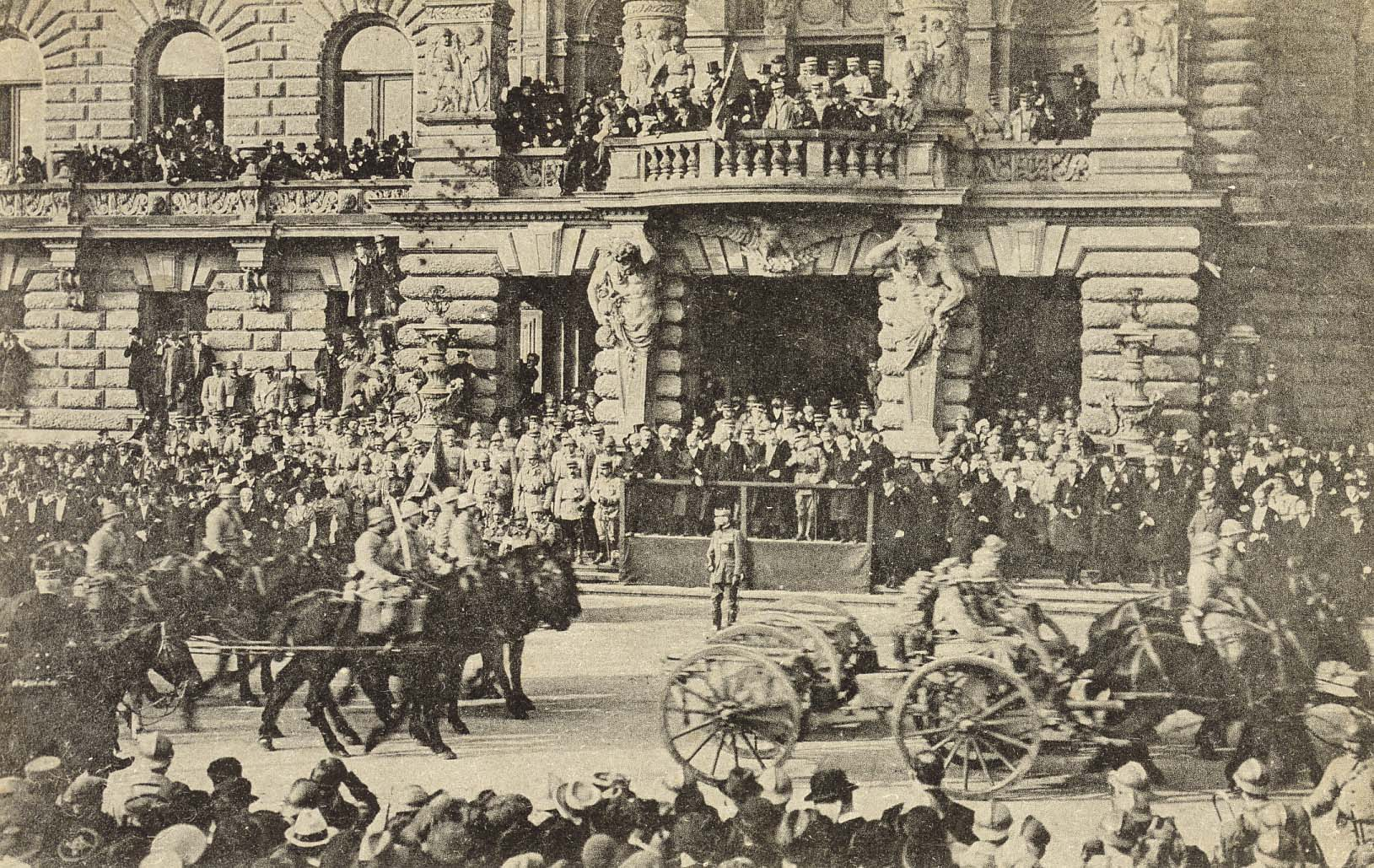
Parade of the French Fourth Army on the Place de la République in Strasbourg on 22 November 1918, with General Gouraud in front of the rostrum.

== Second World War ==
It was initially attached to Army Group No. 2 (east), then in June 1940 joined Army Group No. 4.

=== Composition ===
- 9th Army Corps
  - 47th Infantry Division (France)
    - 5th Machine Gun Battalion
  - 11th Infantry Division (France)
  - 11th Corps Reconnaissance Group
  - 121st Artillery Regiment
  - Faulquemont Fortified Sector
- 20th Army Corps (France)
  - 82nd Infantry Division of Africa (France)
  - 52nd Infantry Division (France)
  - Sarre Fortified Sector
  - 58th Motorized Machine Gun Battalion
- 504 Tank Battalion Group
  - 10th Alpine Battle Tank Battalion
  - 11th Battle Tank Battalion
- Battle Tank Battalion Group 502
  - 20th Battle Tank Battalion
  - 24th Battle Tank Battalion
- 45th Infantry Division (France)
- 1st Polish Infantry Division
- 23rd Infantry Division (France): withdrawn early 1940

== See also ==
- List of French armies in WWI
