= Grevenmacher (Chamber of Representatives constituency) =

Belgian political subdivision

Grevenmacher was a constituency, centred on the town of Grevenmacher, used to elect a single member of the Belgian Chamber of Representatives between 1831 and 1839. It also sent two deputies to the National Congress of Belgium in 1830. It was initially one of eight constituencies in the Province of Luxembourg to take part in the 1831 Belgian general election, the others being Arlon, Bastogne, Diekirch, Luxembourg, Marche, Neufchâteau, and Virton – each electing one member. In 1839, however, under the stipulations of the Treaty of London, Grevenmacher, along with the constituencies of Diekirch and Luxembourg, became parts of the Grand Duchy of Luxembourg.

== Representatives ==
Election	Representative (Party)
1831	Pierre-Ernest Dams (Liberal)
1833	Pierre-Ernest Dams (Liberal)
1837	Charles Metz (Liberal)
