= Arlon-Marche-Bastogne (Walloon Parliament constituency) =

Former Belgian regional legislative constituency

- Walloon Parliament constituency

Current constituency
- Created: 1995
- Seats: 3

Arlon-Marche-Bastogne was a parliamentary constituency in Belgium used to elect members of the Walloon Parliament from 1995 until 2019. It corresponds to the arrondissements of Arlon, Marche-en-Famenne and Bastogne.

A January 2018 decree merged both Luxembourg constituencies (Arlon-Marche-Bastogne and Neufchâteau-Virton) into one.

== Representatives ==
Election	MWP (Party)	MWP (Party)	MWP (Party)
1995	André Bouchat (CDH)	Jean-Pierre Dardenne (MR)	Jacques Santkin (PS)
1999	André Bouchat (CDH)	Jean-Pierre Dardenne (MR)	Jean Bock (PRL)
2004	André Bouchat (CDH)	Jean-Pierre Dardenne (MR)	Jacques Gennen (PS)
2009	André Bouchat (CDH)	Anne-Catherine Goffinet (CDH)	Malika Sonnet (PS)
2014	Josy Arens (CDH)	Eric Lejeune (MR)	Philippe Courard (PS)
2019	Merged into Arlon-Marche-en-Famenne-Bastogne-Neufchâteau-Virton		
