= Augustin Dubail =

French general

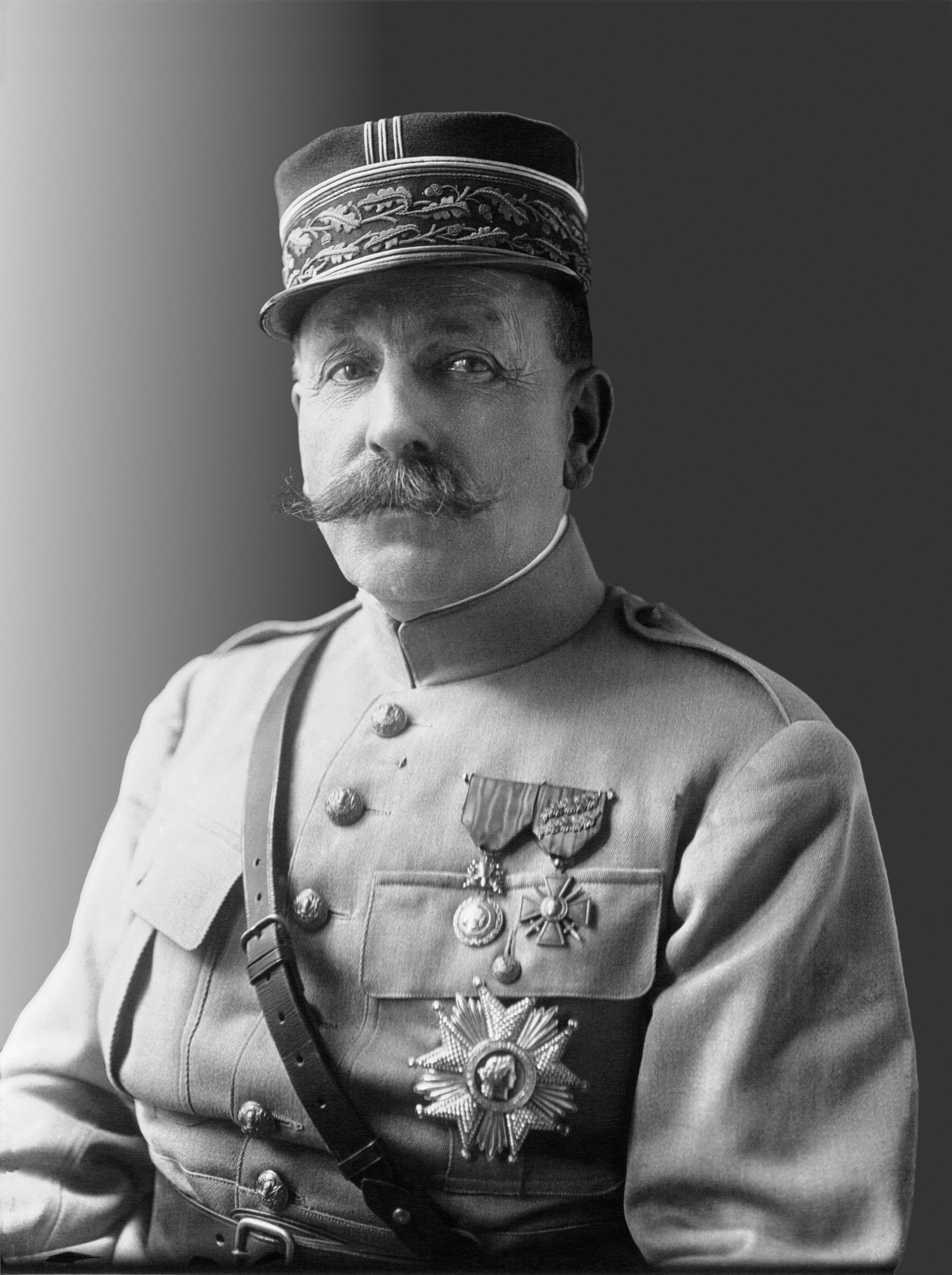
- General Dubail in 1921, wearing his “Kepi over one eye with the chic exquis (exquisite chic) of the Second Empire”.

Military governor of Paris
- In office 1916–1918
- Preceded by: Michel Joseph Maunoury
- Succeeded by: Adolphe Guillaumat

22nd Chief of the Army Staff of France
- In office 31 May – 29 July 1911
- President: Armand Fallières
- Prime Minister: Joseph Caillaux
- Minister of War: François Goiran; Adolphe Messimy
- Preceded by: Édouard de Ladébat
- Succeeded by: Joseph Joffre

4th Commander of the 9th Army Corps
- In office 20 January 1912 – 29 April 1913
- President: Armand Fallières; Raymond Poincaré
- Minister of War: Alexandre Millerand; Albert Lebrun; Eugène Étienne
- Chief of Staff: Joseph Joffre
- Preceded by: Marquis de Galliffet
- Succeeded by: Pierre Joseph Dubois

1st Commander of the 1st Army
- In office 2 August 1914 – 5 January 1915
- President: Raymond Poincaré
- Minister of War: Adolphe Messimy; Alexandre Millerand
- Chief of Staff: Joseph Joffre
- Preceded by: Military unit created
- Succeeded by: Pierre Roques

1st Commander of the Army Group East
- In office 1 July 1915 – 31 March 1916
- President: Raymond Poincaré
- Minister of War: Alexandre Millerand; Joseph Gallieni; Pierre Roques
- Chief of Staff: Joseph Joffre
- Preceded by: Military unit created
- Succeeded by: Pierre Roques

Personal details
- Born: 15 April 1851 Belfort, French Republic
- Died: 7 January 1934 (aged 82) Paris, French Republic
- Education: École Spéciale Militaire

Military service
- Allegiance: (France) Third Republic
- Branch/service: French Army: Infantry
- Years of service: 1870 – 1916
- Rank: Division general
- Commands: List: 14th Infantry Division; 9th Corps; 1st Army; Army Group East
- Battles/wars: List: Franco-Prussian War; First World War

Augustin Yvon Edmond Dubail (15 April 1851 – 7 January 1934) was a French Army general. He commanded the First Army and Army Group East during World War I.

== Early life ==
Augustin Dubail was born in Belfort on April 15, 1851.

== Early military career ==
He graduated from the military school of Saint-Cyr in 1870 and was commissioned an officer in the infantry. During the Franco-Prussian War Dubail fought at Saarbrücken, Spicheren, Borny before being captured at Metz.

After the war Dubail served as a professor at Saint-Cyr, as an officer on the border and in Algeria, where in 1901 he became colonel of the 3rd Zouaves.

In 1904–1905 Dubail served twice as chief of staff of the French Minister of War Maurice Berteaux. Promoted to brigadier general, Dubail commanded the 53rd Infantry Brigade, the 5th Infantry Brigade and the 14th Infantry Brigade and was commandant of Saint-Cyr (1906–1908) before being appointed to the technical committee of the infantry.

During the Agadir Crisis in 1911 Dubail was Chief of Staff of the Army, reporting to the new War Minister, Adolphe Messimy. Messimy and Dubail tried to have the Army adopt 105mm heavy guns, but French generals saw them as a drag on the offensive (preferring to use the lighter and more mobile "Soixante-Quinze" gun) and better used as a defensive weapon like machine guns, so only a few were in use by 1914. General Victor-Constant Michel, Vice-President of the Supreme War Council and commander-in-chief designate, later claimed that Dubail had privately agreed with his plans to deploy reservists in the front line and to adopt a more defensive war plan; however Michel had to resign when no senior general backed him. Dubail's post was abolished in Messimy's reforms.

In 1912 Dubail was given command of the IX Corps and in 1914 he became a member of the Supreme War Council.

== First World War ==
When the First World War broke out in the summer of 1914, Dubail was given command of the First Army, which would start the invasion of Germany by taking Lorraine together with de Castelnau's Second Army. The armies met strong German resistance and were repulsed out of Lorraine with heavy casualties. They were able to reform and defend the French border against a German attack.

In 1915 he was promoted to commander of Army Group East (G.A.E) on the Western Front, around Belfort and Verdun. He became convinced that a major German offensive was coming against Verdun. He called for reinforcements and heavy artillery and the new Allie tanks for the Verdun sector, but the French commander-in-chief, Joseph Joffre, was not convinced that an attack was imminent.

When the German offensive began at Verdun, Joffre partly blamed Dubail, who was fired in March 1916, publicly humiliated. He claimed to have been made a scapegoat for Joffre's lack of foresight, although he had himself public played down the likelihood of a German attack at Verdun. Dubail was hired again in April 1916, becoming military governor of Paris, a position he kept until June 1918, when he was replaced by General Guillaumat.

== Death ==
Dubail died on January 7, 1934, at the age of 82.

== Decorations ==
- Légion d'honneur
  - Knight (24 June 1886)
  - Officer (11 July 1900)
  - Commander (30 December 1905)
  - Grand Officer (30 December 1911)
  - Grand Cross (18 September 1914)
- Médaille militaire (8 October 1915)
- Croix de guerre 1914–1918 with 3 palms
- Commemorative medal of the 1870–1871 War
- Médaille Interalliée de la Victoire 1914-1918
- Médaille Commémorative de la Grande Guerre
- War Cross (Belgium)
- Distinguished Service Medal (US)
- Honorary Knight Grand Cross of the Order of St Michael and St George (UK)
- Officer of Nichan Iftikhar (Tunisia)
- Grand Cross of St. Stanislas
- Grand Cross of the White Eagle
- Grand Cross of the Crown
- Grand Cross of the Sacred Treasure
- Grand Cross of the Rising Sun
