= Arlon-Marche-en-Famenne-Bastogne-Neufchâteau-Virton (Walloon Parliament constituency) =

Political subdivision in Belgium

- Walloon Parliament constituency
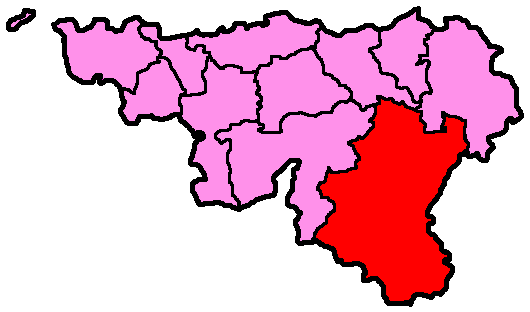

Current constituency
- Created: 2019
- Seats: 6

Arlon-Marche-en-Famenne-Bastogne-Neufchâteau-Virton is a parliamentary constituency in Belgium used to elect members of the Parliament of Wallonia from 2019. It corresponds to the province of Luxembourg. It was created from the former constituencies of Arlon-Marche-Bastogne and Neufchâteau-Virton and was first contested for the 2019 Belgian regional elections.

== Representatives ==
Representatives of Arlon-Marche-en-Famenne-Bastogne-Neufchâteau-Virton (2019–present)
Election	MWP (Party)	MWP (Party)	MWP (Party)	MWP (Party)	MWP (Party)	MWP (Party)
2019	Formed from a merger of Arlon-Marche-Bastogne and Neufchâteau-Virton					
2019	Jean-Philippe Florent (Ecolo)	René Collin (CDH)	Anne-Catherine Goffinet (CDH/ Les Engagés)	Willy Borsus (MR)	Anne Laffut (MR)	Philippe Courard (PS)
2024	Yves Evrard (MR)	François Huberty (Les Engagés)	Anne-Catherine Goffinet (CDH/ Les Engagés)	Willy Borsus (MR)	Anne Laffut (MR)	Mélissa Hanus (PS)

== See also ==
- Arrondissement of Arlon
- Arrondissement of Marche-en-Famenne
- Arrondissement of Bastogne
- Arrondissement of Neufchâteau (Belgium)
- Arrondissement of Virton
