= 9th Army Corps (France) =

Former French military unit

The 9th Army Corps (French: 9^{e} Corps d'Armée) was a large military formation of the French Army, constituted during the Second French Empire, and during the First and the Second World War.

== History ==
=== First World War ===
At the mobilisation, the 9^{e} Army Corps was constituted near Tours as a subunit of the Second Army. The 9^{e} Corps comprised two infantry divisions, the 17th and 52nd, and the Division Marocaine, a colonial infantry division.

=== Second World War ===
In early September 1939, the 9^{e} Corps was re-created in Tours, under general Émile Laure, from elements of the 9th military region. It was a part of the Fourth Army, under General Edouard Réquin, itself a part of the French 2nd Army Group which charged with the defence of the Maginot Line.

==== Battle of France ====
From late 1939 to May 1940, the 9^{e} Corps was deployed around the Saint-Avold - Faulquemont sector, in Moselle, with the general staff in Landroff. Two infantry divisions defended the fortified sector.

By late May, the Germans had pierced in the Ardennes and, with the military situation degrading, front units on the Maginot Line were gradually brought back and sent on the front on the Somme river. On 22 May, General Marcel Ihler took command of the Corps. On 27 May, the Corps marched towards Sarcus, and then to Lyons-la-Forêt, in Normandie, along with general Altmayer's 10ème Armée. Attempts at organised defence were bypassed by the Germans and these units were forced to fall back.

The remnants of the 9^{e} Corps were eventually surrounded in Saint-Valéry-en-Caux and surrendered on 12 June 1940. Most of the soldiers were kept in captivity in Germany until 1945.

== Commanders ==
- 1870 : général Cousin-Montauban
- 1873 : général de Cissey
- 1874 : général du Barail
- 1879 : général Galliffet
- .
- 20 January 1912 : général Dubail
- 29 April 1913 : général Dubois
- 13 March 1915 : général Curé
- 14 May 1916 : général Pentel
- 29 October 1916 : général Niessel
- 22 August 1917 : général Hirschauer
- 17 December 1917 : général Mangin
- 6 June 1918 : général Garnier-Duplessis
- .
- 2 September 1939 : général Laure
- 21 May - 12 June 1940 : général Ihler
