= Arlon-Bastogne-Marche-Neufchâteau-Virton (Chamber of Representatives constituency) =

Belgian political subdivision

Arlon-Bastogne-Marche-Neufchâteau-Virton was a constituency used to elect members of the Belgian Chamber of Representatives between 1999 and 2003.

== Representatives ==
Election	Representative (Party)	Representative (Party)	Representative (Party)
1999	Guy Larcier (PS)	Philippe Collard (MCC)	Josy Arens (cdH)
