= General Laurie =

General Laurie may refer to:

- Sir John Laurie, 6th Baronet (1892−1983), British Army major general
- Percy Laurie (1880–1962), British Army brigadier general
- Sir Robert Laurie, 5th Baronet (c. 1738–1804), British Army general

== See also ==
- Émile Laure (1881–1957), French Army general
