= Luxembourg (Chamber of Representatives constituency) =

Parliamentary constituency in Belgium

- Luxemburg
- Constituency for the Chamber of Representatives
- Location of Luxembourg within Belgium
- Province: Luxembourg
- Region: Wallonia
- Population: 296,008 (2025)
- Electorate: 220,550 (2024)
- Area: 4,459 km^{2} (2024)

Current Constituency
- Created: 1995
- Seats: List: 4 (2003–present); 3 (1995–2003)
- Members: List: Philippe Courard (PS); Benoît Lutgen (LE); Benoît Piedboeuf (MR); Carmen Ramlot (LE)
- Created from: List: Arlon-Marche-Bastogne; Neufchâteau-Virton

Luxembourg (Dutch: Luxemburg) is one of the 11 multi-member constituencies of the Chamber of Representatives, the lower house of the Belgian Federal Parliament, the national legislature of Belgium. The constituency was established as Arlon-Marche-Bastogne-Neufchâteau-Virton (Dutch: Aarlen-Marche-Bastenaken-Neufchâteau-Virton) in 1995 following the fourth Belgian state reform. It was renamed Luxembourg in 2003 following the re-organisation of constituencies across Belgium along provincial lines. It is conterminous with the province of Luxembourg. The constituency currently elects four of the 150 members of the Chamber of Representatives using the open party-list proportional representation electoral system. At the 2024 federal election the constituency had 220,550 registered electors.

== Electoral system ==
Luxembourg currently elects four of the 150 members of the Chamber of Representatives using the open party-list proportional representation electoral system. Seats are allocated using the D'Hondt method. Since 2003 only parties that reach the 5% threshold in the constituency compete for seats.

Electors may vote for the list (party) or for individual candidates, either main candidates or substitute candidates or a combination, on the list. They may vote for as many candidates as there are seats in the constituency. Split-ticket voting (panachage) is not permitted and will result in the ballot paper being invalidated. The minimum number of votes a candidate must obtain to get elected - the quotient - is calculated as the total votes received by the party divided by the number of seats in the constituency plus one. Half the ballot papers where there are no votes for main candidates (i.e. the elector has voted for the list or for substitute candidates only) are redistributed amongst main candidates in the order they appear on the ballot paper so that the candidate's total votes (personal votes plus redistributed votes) equals the quotient. The seats won by the party are then allocated to the candidates with the most number of total votes.

== Election results ==
=== Summary ===
Election	Workers PTB			Ecolo Ecolo			Socialists PS			Democratic Federalists DéFI / FDF			Reformists MR / PRL-FDF			Les Engagés LE / CDH / PSC			Chez Nous Chez Nous / PP			National Front FN		
Election	Votes	%	Seats	Votes	%	Seats	Votes	%	Seats	Votes	%	Seats	Votes	%	Seats	Votes	%	Seats	Votes	%	Seats	Votes	%	Seats
2024				13,506	7.70%	0	29,488	16.81%	1	3,975	2.27%	0	54,196	30.90%	1	56,289	32.09%	2	5,888	3.36%	0			
2019	15,424	9.03%	0	27,338	16.00%	1	31,898	18.67%	1	5,092	2.98%	0	40,242	23.56%	1	40,056	23.45%	1	4,933	2.89%	0			
2014	4,003	2.36%	0	13,471	7.94%	0	37,371	22.02%	1	2,811	1.66%	0	41,346	24.36%	1	56,702	33.41%	2	6,980	4.11%	0			
2010	1,194	0.74%	0	18,853	11.71%	0	45,869	28.49%	1				31,459	19.54%	1	50,564	31.41%	2	3,922	2.44%	0			
2007				19,329	11.63%	0	35,351	21.27%	1				50,537	30.41%	2	49,141	29.57%	1				6,128	3.69%	0
2003				11,257	7.11%	0	41,585	26.25%	1				48,121	30.38%	2	43,860	27.69%	1				5,690	3.59%	0
1999	234	0.16%	0	25,003	17.24%	0	28,989	19.99%	1				40,857	28.17%	1	41,301	28.48%	1				3,496	2.41%	0
1995	511	0.36%	0	13,059	9.28%	0	33,870	24.07%	1				40,915	29.08%	1	45,396	32.26%	1				5,780	4.11%	0

(Figures in italics represent alliances.)

=== Detailed ===
==== 2020s ====
===== 2024 =====
Results of the 2024 federal election held on 9 June 2024:

Party		Votes per arrondissement						Total votes	%	Seats
Party		Arlon	Bast- ogne	Marche- en-Fam- enne	Neuf- château	Virton	Expat- riates	Total votes	%	Seats
Les Engagés	LE	10,326	11,934	11,215	11,181	10,458	1,175	56,289	32.09%	2
Reformist Movement	MR	8,644	8,648	9,956	15,201	10,298	1,449	54,196	30.90%	1
Socialist Party	PS	5,585	3,474	8,107	6,062	5,551	709	29,488	16.81%	1
Ecolo	Ecolo	3,140	1,835	2,455	2,446	2,862	768	13,506	7.70%	0
Chez Nous	Chez Nous	1,000	1,138	1,325	1,199	1,000	226	5,888	3.36%	0
New Flemish Alliance	N-VA	891	849	925	953	634	161	4,413	2.52%	0
Citizen Collective	CC	768	734	780	984	877	157	4,300	2.45%	0
DéFI	DéFI	917	592	746	813	748	159	3,975	2.27%	0
Blank Party	PB	598	540	699	817	619	81	3,354	1.91%	0
Valid votes		31,869	29,744	36,208	39,656	33,047	4,885	175,409	100.00%	4
Rejected votes		3,637	3,110	3,231	4,205	3,681	418	18,282	9.44%	
Total polled		35,506	32,854	39,439	43,861	36,728	5,303	193,691	87.82%	
Registered electors		40,392	37,042	44,289	48,979	41,105	8,743	220,550		
Turnout		87.90%	88.69%	89.05%	89.55%	89.35%	60.65%	87.82%		

The following candidates were elected: Philippe Courard (PS), 10,511 votes; Valérie Lescrenier (LE), 11,326 votes; Benoît Lutgen (LE), 22,480 votes; and Benoît Piedboeuf (MR), 19,127 votes.

Substitutions:

- Valérie Lescrenier (LE) was appointed to the Government of Wallonia and was substituted by Carmen Ramlot (LE) on 18 July 2024.

==== 2010s ====
===== 2019 =====
Results of the 2019 federal election held on 26 May 2019:

Party		Votes per arrondissement						Total votes	%	Seats
Party		Arlon	Bast- ogne	Marche- en-Fam- enne	Neuf- château	Virton	Expat- riates	Total votes	%	Seats
Reformist Movement	MR	7,175	6,462	7,933	11,605	6,934	133	40,242	23.56%	1
Humanist Democratic Centre	CDH	9,201	9,358	7,739	7,504	6,202	52	40,056	23.45%	1
Socialist Party	PS	5,788	3,651	7,706	7,244	7,463	46	31,898	18.67%	1
Ecolo	Ecolo	7,925	4,058	4,622	4,766	5,816	151	27,338	16.00%	1
Workers' Party of Belgium	PTB	2,423	2,460	3,795	3,885	2,845	16	15,424	9.03%	0
DéFI	DéFI	1,093	684	1,229	1,147	920	19	5,092	2.98%	0
People's Party	PP	1,118	855	1,119	1,019	805	17	4,933	2.89%	0
Destexhe List		293	491	365	322	232	4	1,707	1.00%	0
Vlaams Belang	VB	359	281	383	277	213	4	1,517	0.89%	0
The Right		404	219	300	265	248	4	1,440	0.84%	0
Nation		276	204	236	273	185	2	1,176	0.69%	0
Valid votes		36,055	28,723	35,427	38,307	31,863	448	170,823	100.00%	4
Rejected votes		3,934	3,107	3,253	3,971	3,563	30	17,858	9.46%	
Total polled		39,989	31,830	38,680	42,278	35,426	478	188,681	88.82%	
Registered electors		46,043	35,586	43,372	47,116	39,666	658	212,441		
Turnout		86.85%	89.45%	89.18%	89.73%	89.31%	72.64%	88.82%		

The following candidates were elected: Josy Arens (CDH), 17,308 votes; Mélissa Hanus (PS), 12,183 votes; Benoît Piedboeuf (MR), 14,052 votes; and Cécile Thibaut (Ecolo), 6,502 votes.

Substitutions:

- Cécile Thibaut (Ecolo) resigned on 23 September 2021 and was substituted by Olivier Vajda (Ecolo) on the same day.

===== 2014 =====
Results of the 2014 federal election held on 25 May 2014:

Party		Votes per arrondissement						Total votes	%	Seats
Party		Arlon	Bast- ogne	Marche- en-Fam- enne	Neuf- château	Virton	Expat- riates	Total votes	%	Seats
Humanist Democratic Centre	CDH	10,343	12,568	11,854	12,509	9,346	82	56,702	33.41%	2
Reformist Movement	MR	8,120	6,986	8,025	10,519	7,596	100	41,346	24.36%	1
Socialist Party	PS	7,934	4,049	8,069	8,784	8,464	71	37,371	22.02%	1
Ecolo	Ecolo	3,905	1,901	2,449	2,364	2,807	45	13,471	7.94%	0
People's Party	PP	1,417	1,189	1,623	1,455	1,288	8	6,980	4.11%	0
Workers' Party of Belgium	PTB	752	675	1,167	743	661	5	4,003	2.36%	0
Debout Les Belges!		794	389	564	622	583	6	2,958	1.74%	0
Francophone Democratic Federalists	FDF	711	377	580	641	498	4	2,811	1.66%	0
The Right		566	314	387	417	324	4	2,012	1.19%	0
Belgische Unie – Union Belge	BUB	225	83	158	153	127	6	752	0.44%	0
Left Movement	MG	328	54	65	63	155	1	666	0.39%	0
Rassemblement Wallonie France	RWF	151	98	168	106	120	2	645	0.38%	0
Valid votes		35,246	28,683	35,109	38,376	31,969	334	169,717	100.00%	4
Rejected votes		3,328	2,218	2,607	3,207	3,019	37	14,416	7.83%	
Total polled		38,574	30,901	37,716	41,583	34,988	371	184,133	89.83%	
Registered electors		44,299	33,889	41,787	45,813	38,716	484	204,988		
Turnout		87.08%	91.18%	90.26%	90.77%	90.37%	76.65%	89.83%		

The following candidates were elected: Benoît Lutgen (CDH), 36,340 votes; Benoît Piedboeuf (MR), 15,351 votes; Sébastian Pirlot (PS), 13,815 votes; and Isabelle Poncelet (CDH), 12,954 votes.

===== 2010 =====
Results of the 2010 federal election held on 13 June 2010:

Party		Votes per arrondissement						Total votes	%	Seats
Party		Arlon	Bast- ogne	Marche- en-Fam- enne	Neuf- château	Virton	Expat- riates	Total votes	%	Seats
Humanist Democratic Centre	CDH	9,701	11,097	9,802	11,102	8,802	60	50,564	31.41%	2
Socialist Party	PS	8,907	5,270	11,620	10,752	9,302	18	45,869	28.49%	1
Reformist Movement	MR	5,108	6,455	6,078	8,490	5,272	56	31,459	19.54%	1
Ecolo	Ecolo	4,628	2,613	3,463	3,959	4,122	68	18,853	11.71%	0
People's Party	PP	837	573	804	1,073	633	2	3,922	2.44%	0
Wallonia First		722	415	654	514	616	8	2,929	1.82%	0
Belgische Unie – Union Belge	BUB	710	338	435	601	524	10	2,618	1.63%	0
Rassemblement Wallonie France	RWF	357	323	590	406	570	3	2,249	1.40%	0
Left Front		245	227	254	253	227	0	1,206	0.75%	0
Workers' Party of Belgium	PTB	247	197	326	218	206	0	1,194	0.74%	0
Socialist Movement Plus	MS+	32	23	24	34	21	1	135	0.08%	0
Valid votes		31,494	27,531	34,050	37,402	30,295	226	160,998	100.00%	4
Rejected votes		3,314	2,460	2,321	3,232	3,166	19	14,512	8.27%	
Total polled		34,808	29,991	36,371	40,634	33,461	245	175,510	90.24%	
Registered electors		39,242	32,739	40,524	44,536	37,177	264	194,482		
Turnout		88.70%	91.61%	89.75%	91.24%	90.00%	92.80%	90.24%		

The following candidates were elected: Philippe Collard (MR), 12,124 votes; Philippe Courard (PS), 22,899 votes; Benoît Lutgen (CDH), 33,038 votes; and Isabelle Poncelet (CDH), 11,466 votes.

Substitutions:

- Isabelle Poncelet (CDH) resigned on 14 June 2010 and was substituted by Josy Arens (CDH) on 6 July 2010.
- Philippe Courard (PS) was appointed to the federal government and was substituted by André Perpète (PS) on 7 December 2011.

==== 2000s ====
===== 2007 =====
Results of the 2007 federal election held on 10 June 2007:

Party		Votes per arrondissement						Total votes	%	Seats
Party		Arlon	Bast- ogne	Marche- en-Fam- enne	Neuf- château	Virton	Expat- riates	Total votes	%	Seats
Reformist Movement	MR	8,482	10,179	10,150	13,014	8,572	140	50,537	30.41%	2
Humanist Democratic Centre	CDH	11,714	9,426	9,085	9,964	8,888	64	49,141	29.57%	1
Socialist Party	PS	7,166	3,778	8,524	8,018	7,790	75	35,351	21.27%	1
Ecolo	Ecolo	4,737	2,582	3,930	4,131	3,852	97	19,329	11.63%	0
National Front	FN	1,448	880	1,416	1,355	1,019	10	6,128	3.69%	0
Rassemblement Wallonie France	RWF	412	248	298	366	682	5	2,011	1.21%	0
New Belgian Front	FNB	365	214	270	275	222	2	1,348	0.81%	0
Communist Party of Wallonia	PC	295	149	250	268	237	6	1,205	0.73%	0
Federal Christian Democrats	CDF	184	111	159	241	114	3	812	0.49%	0
Union for a Popular Movement – Belgium	UMP-B	86	33	72	55	52	4	302	0.18%	0
Valid votes		34,889	27,600	34,154	37,687	31,428	406	166,164	100.00%	4
Rejected votes		3,291	2,084	2,423	2,845	2,782	37	13,462	7.49%	
Total polled		38,180	29,684	36,577	40,532	34,210	443	179,626	92.17%	
Registered electors		42,520	31,773	39,571	43,472	37,040	509	194,885		
Turnout		89.79%	93.43%	92.43%	93.24%	92.36%	87.03%	92.17%		

The following candidates were elected: Josy Arens (CDH), 23,511 votes; Philippe Collard (MR), 20,558 votes; Carine Lecomte (MR), 7,877 votes; and André Perpète (PS), 10,452 votes.

===== 2003 =====
Results of the 2003 federal election held on 18 May 2003:

Party		Votes per arrondissement						Total votes	%	Seats
Party		Arlon	Bast- ogne	Marche- en-Fam- enne	Neuf- château	Virton	Expat- riates	Total votes	%	Seats
Reformist Movement	MR	8,232	10,070	9,286	12,056	8,344	133	48,121	30.38%	2
Humanist Democratic Centre	CDH	9,852	7,676	9,969	8,557	7,740	66	43,860	27.69%	1
Socialist Party	PS	9,621	5,283	8,451	9,843	8,315	72	41,585	26.25%	1
Ecolo	Ecolo	3,171	1,373	2,211	2,096	2,333	73	11,257	7.11%	0
National Front	FN	1,381	847	1,187	1,279	989	7	5,690	3.59%	0
Federal Christian Democrats	CDF	600	464	559	1,115	694	17	3,449	2.18%	0
Rassemblement Wallonie France	RWF	340	203	228	279	878	6	1,934	1.22%	0
Vivant	Vivant	366	228	356	312	256	5	1,523	0.96%	0
Socialist Movement	MS	84	53	85	185	198	1	606	0.38%	0
Revolutionary Progressive Party	PPR	105	35	62	85	85	4	376	0.24%	0
Valid votes		33,752	26,232	32,394	35,807	29,832	384	158,401	100.00%	4
Rejected votes		3,756	2,338	2,699	3,169	3,236	37	15,235	8.77%	
Total polled		37,508	28,570	35,093	38,976	33,068	421	173,636	92.21%	
Registered electors		41,780	30,509	37,891	41,826	35,796	505	188,307		
Turnout		89.78%	93.64%	92.62%	93.19%	92.38%	83.37%	92.21%		

The following candidates were elected: Josy Arens (CDH), 20,369 votes; Philippe Collard (MR), 17,847 votes; André Perpète (PS), 13,967 votes; and Dominique Tilmans (MR), 10,772.

==== 1990s ====
===== 1999 =====
Results of the 1999 federal election held on 13 June 1999:

Party		Votes per arrondissement					Total votes	%	Seats
Party		Arlon	Bast- ogne	Marche- en-Fam- enne	Neuf- château	Virton	Total votes	%	Seats
Christian Social Party	PSC	6,905	7,612	9,070	10,556	7,158	41,301	28.48%	1
Liberal Reformist Party and Democratic Front of Francophones	PRL-FDF	6,332	9,007	8,775	10,006	6,737	40,857	28.17%	1
Socialist Party	PS	6,850	3,308	5,674	7,367	5,790	28,989	19.99%	1
Ecolo	Ecolo	6,554	3,174	4,951	4,607	5,717	25,003	17.24%	0
National Front	FN	822	506	799	690	679	3,496	2.41%	0
Vivant	Vivant	538	375	566	494	475	2,448	1.69%	0
French People United in a National; Action of Co-operation and Emancipation	FRANCE	93	59	100	133	425	810	0.56%	0
Communist Party of Wallonia	PC	136	92	138	125	166	657	0.45%	0
Party for a New Politics in Belgium	PNPB	154	47	63	193	91	548	0.38%	0
New Belgian Front	FNB	44	80	116	63	58	361	0.25%	0
Workers' Party of Belgium	PTB	50	39	72	37	36	234	0.16%	0
Democratic Union	UDDU	137	12	16	32	36	233	0.16%	0
Paradise Action Party	PAP	18	11	27	31	18	105	0.07%	0
Valid votes		28,633	24,322	30,367	34,334	27,386	145,042	100.00%	3
Rejected votes		3,651	2,910	3,159	3,660	4,349	17,729	10.89%	
Total polled		32,284	27,232	33,526	37,994	31,735	162,771	92.18%	
Registered electors		35,670	29,043	36,405	41,043	34,424	176,585		
Turnout		90.51%	93.76%	92.09%	92.57%	92.19%	92.18%		

The following candidates were elected: Antoine Duquesne (PRL-FDF), 15,601 votes; Guy Larcier (PS), 11,508 votes; and Jean-Pol Poncelet (PSC), 25,522 votes.

Substitutions:

- Antoine Duquesne (PRL-FDF) was appointed to the federal government and was substituted by Philippe Collard (PRL-FDF) on 14 July 1999.

===== 1995 =====
Results of the 1995 federal election held on 21 May 1995:

Party		Votes per arrondissement					Total votes	%	Seats
Party		Arlon	Bast- ogne	Marche- en-Fam- enne	Neuf- château	Virton	Total votes	%	Seats
Christian Social Party	PSC	8,434	8,795	9,189	11,274	7,704	45,396	32.26%	1
Liberal Reformist Party and Democratic Front of Francophones	PRL-FDF	6,428	7,508	8,741	10,767	7,471	40,915	29.08%	1
Socialist Party	PS	8,816	3,593	6,553	7,198	7,710	33,870	24.07%	1
Ecolo	Ecolo	2,986	1,837	3,012	2,664	2,560	13,059	9.28%	0
National Front	FN	1,292	1,059	1,169	1,142	1,118	5,780	4.11%	0
Unitarist and Centrist	UNIE	192	91	111	277	520	1,191	0.85%	0
Workers' Party of Belgium	PTB	113	65	123	121	89	511	0.36%	0
Valid votes		28,261	22,948	28,898	33,443	27,172	140,722	100.00%	3
Rejected votes		3,700	3,386	3,681	4,116	3,877	18,760	11.76%	
Total polled		31,961	26,334	32,579	37,559	31,049	159,482	92.66%	
Registered electors		34,913	28,039	35,099	40,393	33,670	172,114		
Turnout		91.54%	93.92%	92.82%	92.98%	92.22%	92.66%		

The following candidates were elected: Antoine Duquesne (PRL-FDF), 17,515 votes; Guy Larcier (PS), 14,407 votes; and Jean-Pol Poncelet (PSC), 21,208 votes.

Substitutions:

- Jean-Pol Poncelet (PSC) was appointed to the federal government and was substituted by Josy Arens (PSC) on 3 October 1995.
