= Neufchâteau-Virton (Chamber of Representatives constituency) =

Belgian political subdivision

Neufchâteau-Virton was a constituency used to elect a single member of the Belgian Chamber of Representatives between 1900 and 1991.

== Representatives ==
Election	Representative (Party)	Representative (Party)	Representative (Party)
1900	Formed from a merger of Neufchâteau and Virton		
1900	Georges Lorand (Liberal)	Winand Heynen (Catholic)	2 seats
1904	Georges Lorand (Liberal)	Winand Heynen (Catholic)	2 seats
1908	Georges Lorand (Liberal)	Winand Heynen (Catholic)	2 seats
1912	Gustave Rahlenbeck (Liberal)	Hippolyte Braffort (Catholic)	Jules Poncelet (Catholic)
1919	Emile Baudrux (Liberal)	Léon Colleaux (PS)	Jules Poncelet (Catholic)
1921	Edouard Richard (Catholic)	Léon Colleaux (PS)	Jules Poncelet (Catholic)
1925	Henri Mernier (Catholic)	Léon Colleaux (PS)	Jules Poncelet (Catholic)
1929	Edmond Jacques (PS)	Léon Colleaux (PS)	Jules Poncelet (Catholic)
1932	Edmond Jacques (PS)	Ernest Adam (Catholic)	Jules Poncelet (Catholic)
1936	Edmond Jacques (PS)	Albert Fasbender (REX)	Jules Poncelet (Catholic)
1939	Edmond Jacques (PS)	Jean Mignon (Catholic)	Ernest Adam (Catholic)
1946	Edmond Jacques (PS)	Edouard Leclère (CVP)	Paul François (CVP)
1949	Arsène Uselding (CVP)	Désiré Lamalle (CVP)	Philippe Le Hodey (CVP)
1950	Edmond Jacques (PS)	Désiré Lamalle (CVP)	Philippe Le Hodey (CVP)
1954	Henri Cugnon (BSP)	Désiré Lamalle (CVP)	Philippe Le Hodey (CVP)
1958	Henri Cugnon (BSP)	Désiré Lamalle (CVP)	Philippe Le Hodey (CVP)
1961	Henri Cugnon (BSP)	Joseph Michel (CVP)	Philippe Le Hodey (CVP)
1965	2 seats	Joseph Michel (CVP)	Gilbert Gribomont (CVP)
1968	2 seats	Joseph Michel (CVP)	Charles Bossicart (PVV)
1971	2 seats	Joseph Michel (CVP)	Henri Pierret (cdH)
1974	2 seats	Joseph Michel (CVP)	Henri Pierret (cdH)
1977	2 seats	Joseph Michel (CVP)	Henri Pierret (cdH)
1978	2 seats	Joseph Michel (CVP)	Henri Pierret (cdH)
1981	2 seats	Joseph Michel (CVP)	Jean Militis (PRL)
1985	2 seats	Joseph Michel (CVP)	Michèle Detaille (PRL)
1988	2 seats	Joseph Michel (CVP)	Guy Charlier (PS)
1991	2 seats	Jean-Pol Poncelet (cdH)	Guy Charlier (PS)
1995	Merged into Arlon-Marche-Bastogne-Neufchâteau-Virton		
