= Constant d'Hoffschmidt =

Belgian politician

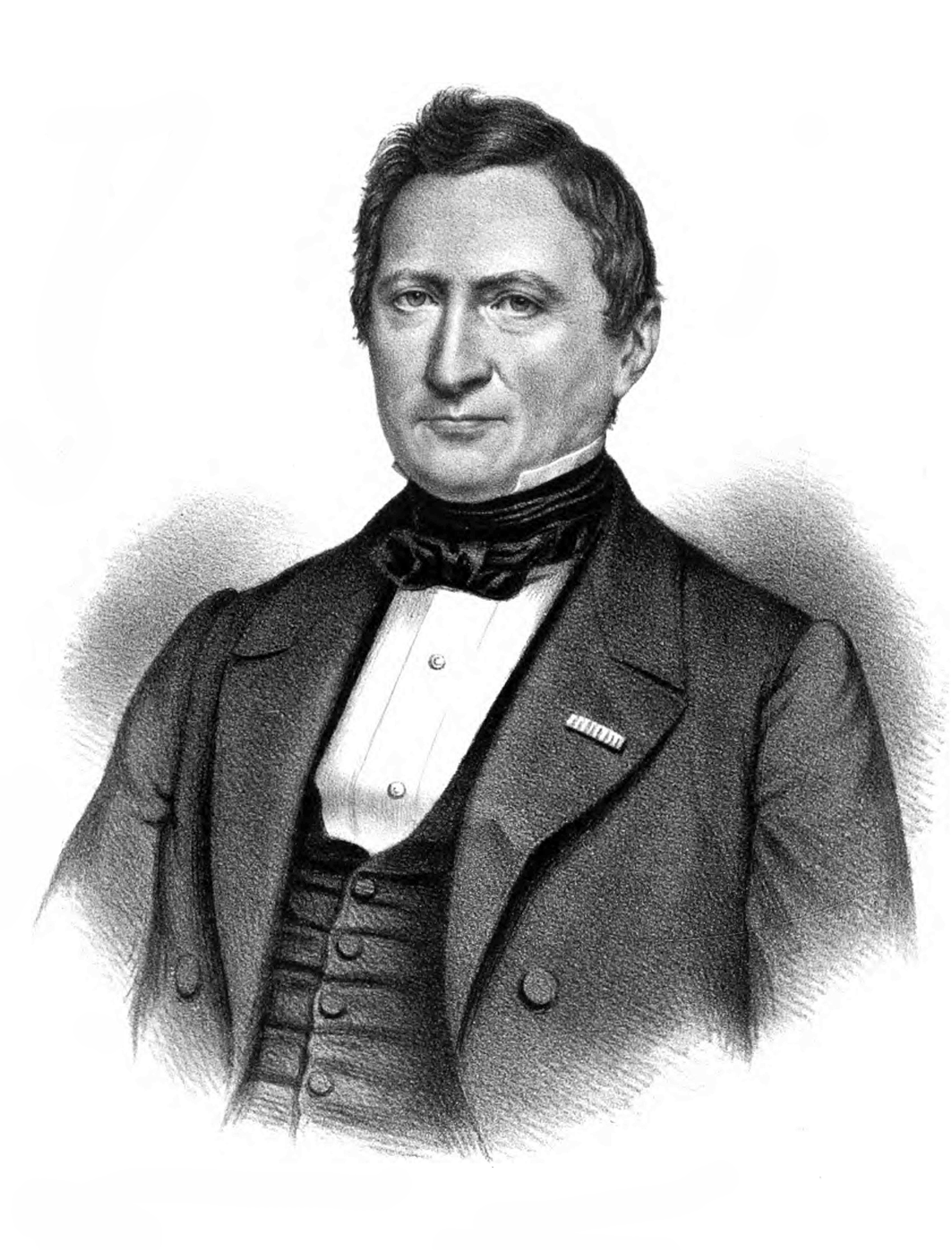
Lithograph after a photograph by Brandt et Detrez

Constant Ernest d'Hoffschmidt de Resteigne (1804–1873) was a Belgian businessman, mining engineer and Liberal politician who from 1847 to 1852 served as his country's foreign minister.

== Life ==
D'Hoffschmidt was born at Recogne on 7 March 1804, the youngest of his parents' six children. In June 1830, he became a member of the provincial assembly of Luxembourg, where he was an advocate for independence from the Netherlands.

In 1831, he married Léocadie Lamquet, who died the following year. He then married Eugénie de Steenhault, daughter of the provincial governor of Luxembourg, with whom he had two sons and two daughters.

In 1839, he was elected to the Belgian Chamber of Representatives from the constituency of Bastogne. In the chamber, he spoke in favour of the interests of Luxembourg, particularly with regard to charcoal, mining and forestry. His political views were those of an unstrident and conciliatory liberalism. In Sylvain Van de Weyer's shortlived "unity" ministry (1845–1846), he served as Minister of Public Works. In that capacity, he established a railway concession between Brussels and Arlon, via Dinant, that was awarded to an English company.

After the Liberal victory in the 1847 elections, he served as Foreign Minister in Charles Rogier's first government (1847–1852). His decision to appoint the former Liberal minister of justice Mathieu Leclercq as ambassador to the Holy See was rejected by Pope Pius IX in 1847, in response to which the post was left empty, without formally breaking off diplomatic relations, until Eugène, 8th Prince of Ligne, was appointed the following year.

D'Hoffschmidt was foreign minister during the revolutions that swept Western and Central Europe in 1848, leaving Belgium untouched but for the Risquons-Tout incident instigated from France. A number of foreign revolutionary agitators were expelled, among them Karl Marx. Nevertheless, Belgium was the first country on the European continent to recognise the French Second Republic established in 1848. The later years of his time in office were overshadowed by demands from Paris and Berlin to provide more favourable trading terms than those existing under the treaties in force. He lost his seat in the partial legislative elections of 1854, but was re-elected in the general election of 1857, sitting until 1863. As a member of parliament he continued to take an active interest in international rail connections with the Grand-Duchy of Luxembourg, France, and the states of the Zollverein.

In November 1854 he served as extraordinary envoy of Leopold I of Belgium to the Kingdom of Saxony to congratulate John of Saxony on his accession to the throne.

He was elected to the Senate in 1867, but lost his seat in 1870. He died at Deux-Acren on 14 February 1873. On 11 May his widow was awarded a state pension.

== Honours ==
- Order of Leopold: knight, 1 June 1845; officer, 9 June 1854.
- grand cordon of the Legion of Honour
- grand cross of the Order of Saints Maurice and Lazarus
- grand cross of the Order of Saint Michael of Bavaria
- Order of Glory, first class
