= Marche (Chamber of Representatives constituency) =

Belgian political subdivision

Marche was a constituency used to elect a single member of the Belgian Chamber of Representatives between 1831 and 1900.

== Representatives ==
Election	Representative (Party)
1831	Théodore Jacques (Liberal)
1833	Jean-Baptiste Jadot (Liberal)
1837	Jean-Baptiste Jadot (Liberal)
1841	Jean-Baptiste Jadot (Liberal)
1845	Louis Orban de Xivry (Catholic)
1848	Théodore Jacques (Catholic)
1852	Théodore Jacques (Catholic)
1856	Théodore Jacques (Catholic)
1857	Léon Orban (Liberal)
1861	Léon Orban (Liberal)
1864	Léon Orban (Liberal)
1868	Léon Orban (Liberal)
1870	Jules Pety de Thozée (Catholic)
1874	Jules Pety de Thozée (Catholic)
1878	Jules Pety de Thozée (Catholic)
1882	Paul de Favereau (Catholic)
1886	Paul de Favereau (Catholic)
1890	Paul de Favereau (Catholic)
1892	Paul de Favereau (Catholic)
1894	Paul de Favereau (Catholic)
1898	Paul de Favereau (Catholic)
1900	Merged into Arlon-Marche-Bastogne
