= Arlon (Chamber of Representatives constituency) =

Former Belgian national legislative constituency

Arlon was a constituency used to elect a single member of the Belgian Chamber of Representatives between 1831 and 1900.

== Representatives ==
Election	Representative (Party)
1831	Jean-Baptiste Nothomb (Liberal)
1833	Jean-Baptiste Nothomb (Liberal)
1837	Jean-Baptiste Nothomb (Liberal)
1841	Jean-Baptiste Nothomb (Liberal)
1845	Jean-Baptiste Nothomb (Liberal)
1848	Victor Tesch (Liberal)
1852	Victor Tesch (Liberal)
1856	Victor Tesch (Liberal)
1857	Victor Tesch (Liberal)
1861	Victor Tesch (Liberal)
1864	Victor Tesch (Liberal)
1868	Victor Tesch (Liberal)
1870	Victor Tesch (Liberal)
1874	Victor Tesch (Liberal)
1878	Victor Tesch (Liberal)
1882	Victor Tesch (Liberal)
1886	Victor Tesch (Liberal)
1890	Victor Tesch (Liberal)
1892	Alphonse Nothomb (Catholic)
1894	Camille Ozeray (Liberal)
1898	Adolphe de Limburg Stirum (Catholic)
1900	Merged into Arlon-Marche-Bastogne
