= Alphonse Nudant =

French World War I general

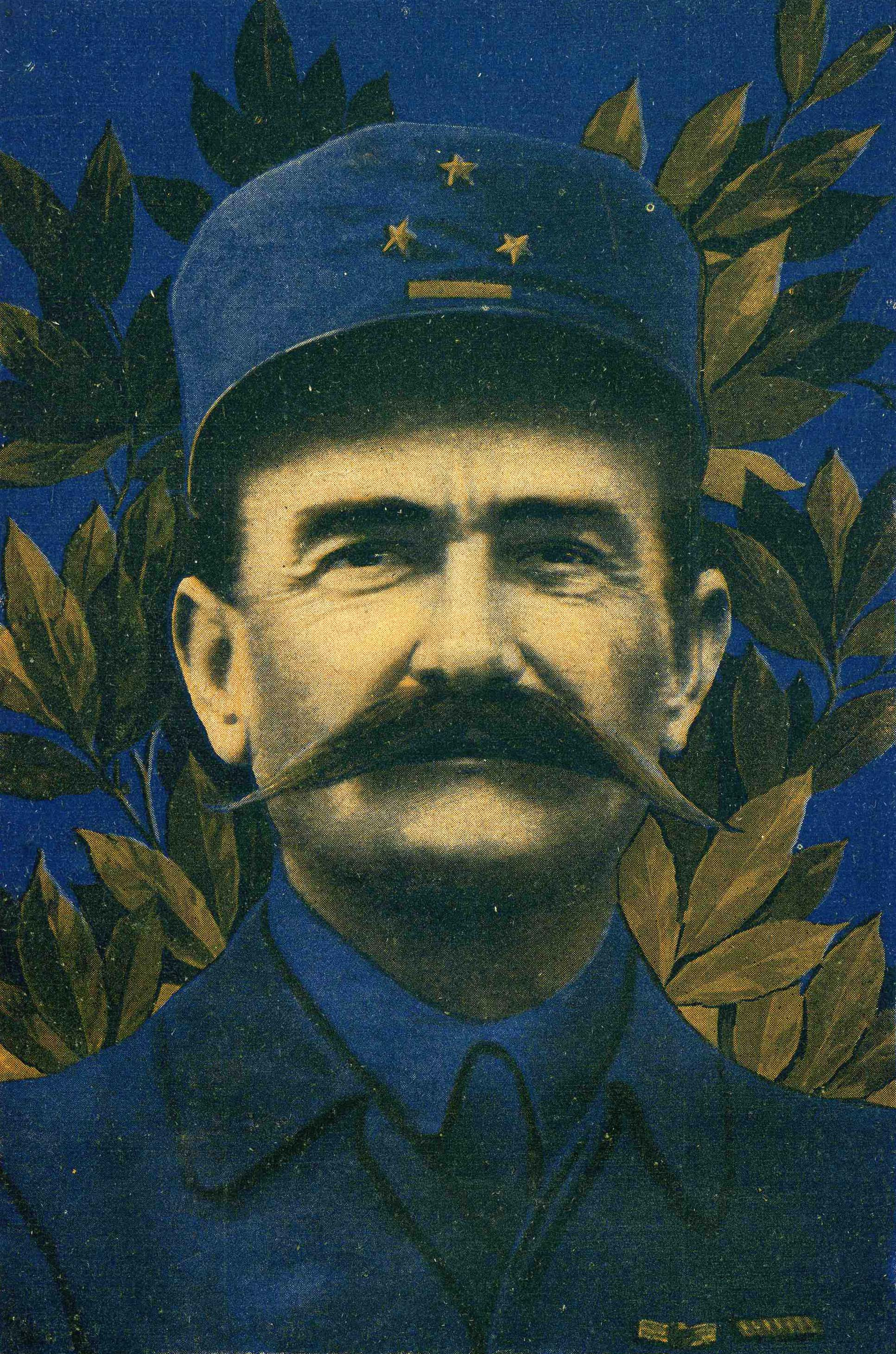
- Born: 15 December 1861; Ladoix-Serrigny, Côte-d'Or, France
- Died: 17 January 1952 (aged 90); Saint-Jacut-de-la-Mer, Côtes-d'Armor, France
- Military career
- Allegiance: France
- Branch: French Army
- Service years: 1881 – 1923
- Rank: Divisional General
- Conflicts: World War I: Western Front; Battle of the Somme; Battle of Amiens; Fifth Battle of Ypres; Battle of the Lys and the Escaut

Alphonse Pierre Nudant was a French general who participated in World War I. He commanded several units throughout his service in the war, notably becoming part of the Chief of Staff of the French Fourth Army.

== Biography ==
Nudant was born in Ladoix-Serrigny, Côte-d'Or in 1861. He entered service in the French Army in 1881 and after two years of service in the ranks as a volunteer in the 5th Artillery Regiment, he joined the École polytechnique in 1883.

In 1894 he was promoted to captain. In 1898, he was patented by the staff, ranked first out of 83 competitors. He was promoted to squadron leader in 1905. Two years later, he became assistant professor at the École Supérieure de Guerre where he taught the staff several courses. It was there that he was promoted to lieutenant-colonel in 1911.

Nudant was promoted to colonel in June 1914 on the brink of World War I. On 2 August 1914 Nudant became part of the Chief of Staff of the Fourth Army. On 12 September 1914 he was temporarily appointed brigadier general before being confirmed on 25 November 1915. Being a first aide-major general, he then commanded the 70th Infantry Division before commanding the 33rd and 34th Army Corps and promoted to Divisional General on 26 June 1917, while retaining command until 27 March 1919. Nudant also participated in the Battle of the Somme during his service with the 33rd Corps. He was then placed at the head of the 7th Army Corps until 1923 when Nudant retired from military service.

He was given the Grand Officer of the Legion of Honor on 10 July 1920 and received the Distinguished Service Medal the same year.

In 1919, he was the head of the Inter-Allied Armistice Commission in Spa, within which he led the Allied representations with, according to Paul Desgrées du Loû, “ authority and distinction”.

He spent his entire retirement as a soldier at Saint-Jacut and died there on 17 January 1952 at his villa “Marguerite”.»
