= Valérie Lescrenier =

Belgian politician (born 1979)

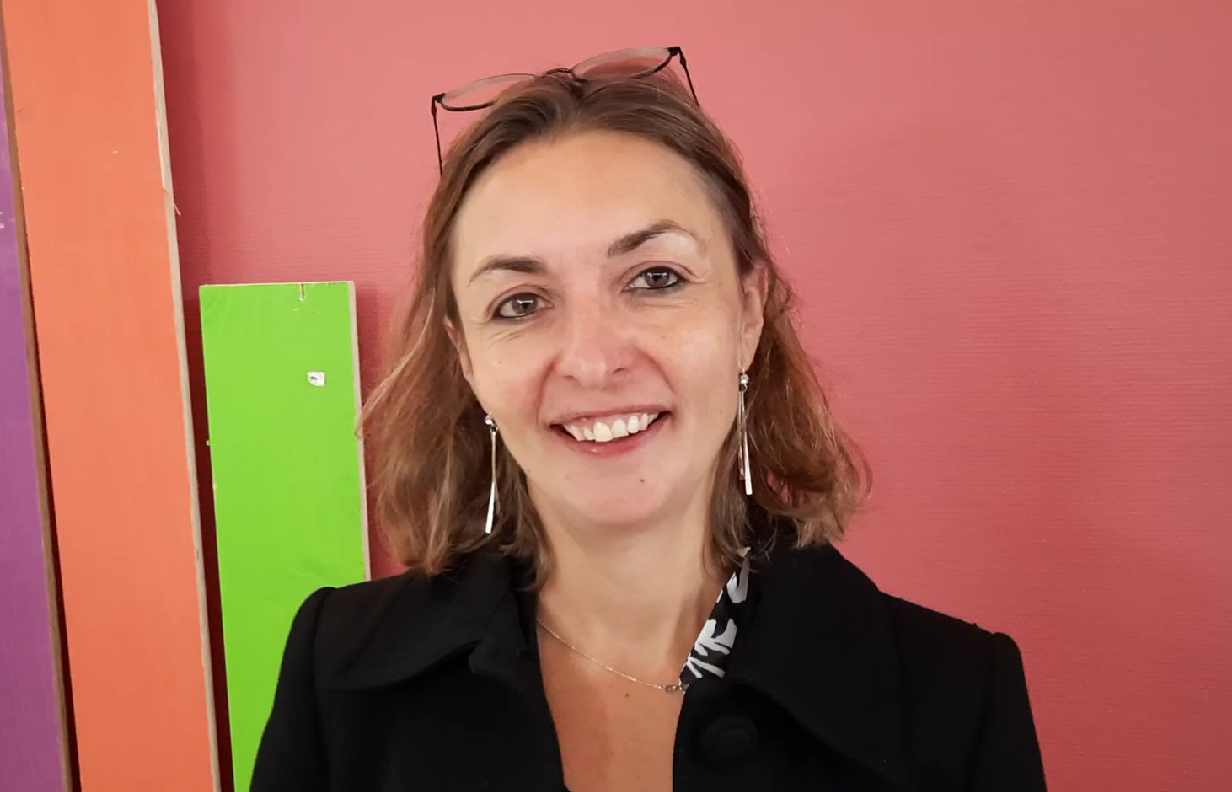
- Lescrenier in 2024

Minister of Tourism, Heritage, Infrastructure and Childcare of Wallonia
- Incumbent
- Assumed office 15 July 2024

Minister of Early Childhood and Youth Care of the French Community
- Incumbent
- Assumed office 15 July 2024

Member of the Chamber of Representatives
- In office 10 July 2024 – 15 July 2024
- Succeeded by: Carmen Ramlot
- Constituency: Luxembourg

Personal details
- Born: 16 August 1979 (age 46)
- Party: Les Engagés

Valérie Lescrenier (born 16 August 1979) is a Belgian politician. Since 2024, she has served as minister of tourism, heritage, infrastructure and childcare in the government of Wallonia, and as minister of early childhood and youth care in the government of the French Community. In July 2024, she was a member of the Chamber of Representatives.
