= List of protected heritage sites in Tintigny =

This table shows an overview of the protected heritage sites in the Walloon town Tintigny. This list is part of Belgium's national heritage.

Object	Year/architect	Town/section	Address	Coordinates	Number^{?}	Image
Ensemble "Cranière the Lahage" in Bellefontaine ^{(nl)} ^{(fr)}		Tintigny		49.634405°N 5.481220°E	85039-CLT-0001-01 Info	
The old branches of the Semois river ^{(nl)} ^{(fr)}		Tintigny		49.687928°N 5.551508°E	85039-CLT-0003-01 Info	
Church of Notre-Dame de l'Assomption and the wall of cemetery around it, excluding the portion along the monumental staircase, in Tintigny ^{(nl)} ^{(fr)}		Tintigny		49.683790°N 5.514142°E	85039-CLT-0004-01 Info	Kerk Notre-Dame de l'Assomption en de muur die de begraafplaats omgeevd, met uitzondering van het deel langs de monumentale trap, te Tintigny More images
Military cemetery called "de l'entrée de la Forêt" and its surroundings ^{(nl)} ^{(fr)}		Tintigny		49.729122°N 5.479960°E	85039-CLT-0008-01 Info	
Military cemetery "du plateau" and its surroundings ^{(nl)} ^{(fr)}		Tintigny		49.737892°N 5.480111°E	85039-CLT-0009-01 Info	Militaire begraafplaats "du plateau" en zijn omgeving More images
Washhouse Tintigny, outbuilding excluded ^{(nl)} ^{(fr)}		Tintigny		49.693893°N 5.520455°E	85039-CLT-0010-01 Info	
Wash house in the center of the village Bellefontaine ^{(nl)} ^{(fr)}		Tintigny	Bellefontaine	49.664437°N 5.496013°E	85039-CLT-0012-01 Info	Washuis in het centrum van het dorp te Bellefontaine
The ponds of the Soye ^{(nl)} ^{(fr)}		Tintigny		49.630657°N 5.421774°E	85039-CLT-0015-01 Info	

== See also ==
- List of protected heritage sites in Luxembourg (Belgium)
