= 1835 Belgian general election =

← 1833	9 June 1835	1837 →

51 of the 102 seats in the Chamber of Representatives
Government before election
de Theux de Meylandt I
Catholic-Liberal
Government after election
de Theux de Meylandt I
Catholic-Liberal

Partial legislative elections were held in Belgium on Tuesday 9 June 1835. In the Senate elections Catholics won 31 seats and Liberals eight. Only 23,000 people were eligible to vote in the election.

Under the alternating system, Chamber elections were only held in four out of the nine provinces: East Flanders, Hainaut, Liège and Limburg. Thus, 51 of the 102 Chamber seats were up for election.

The incumbent government was led by Barthélémy de Theux de Meylandt.

== Results ==
=== Senate ===
Party	Seats	+/–
Catholics	31	0
Liberals	8	+1
Independents	12	–1
Total	51	0
Source: Sternberger et al.
