= Neufchâteau-Virton (Walloon Parliament constituency) =

- Walloon Parliament constituency

Current constituency
- Created: 1995
- Seats: 2

Neufchâteau-Virton was a parliamentary constituency in Belgium used to elect members of the Walloon Parliament from 1995 until 2019. It corresponds to the arrondissements of Neufchâteau and Virton.

A January 2018 decree merged both Luxembourg constituencies (Neufchâteau-Virton and Arlon-Marche-Bastogne) into one.

== Representatives ==
Election	MWP (Party)	MWP (Party)
1995	Gérard Mathieu (PRL)	Pierre Scharff (PSC)
1999	Gérard Mathieu (PRL)	Pierre Scharff (PSC)
2004	Dimitri Fourny (CDH)	Sébastian Pirlot (PS)
2009	Dimitri Fourny (CDH)	Sébastian Pirlot (PS)
2014	Dimitri Fourny (CDH)	Yves Evrard (MR)
2019	Merged into Arlon-Marche-en-Famenne-Bastogne-Neufchâteau-Virton	
