= Diekirch (Chamber of Representatives constituency) =

Belgian political subdivision

Diekirch was a constituency used to elect a single member of the Belgian Chamber of Representatives between 1831 and 1841. In 1839, under the stipulations of the Treaty of London, a portion of Diekirch, along with the constituencies of Grevenmacher and Luxembourg, became parts of the Grand Duchy of Luxembourg.

== Representatives ==
Election	Representative (Party)
1831	Nicolas Watlet (Liberal)
1833	Nicolas Watlet (Liberal)
1837	Remi De Puydt (Liberal)
