= Bastogne (Chamber of Representatives constituency) =

Former Belgian national legislative constituency

Bastogne was a constituency used to elect a single member of the Belgian Chamber of Representatives between 1831 and 1900.

== Representatives ==
Election	Representative (Party)
1831	François d'Hoffschmidt (Liberal)
1833	François d'Hoffschmidt (Liberal)
1837	Constant d'Hoffschmidt (Liberal)
1841	Constant d'Hoffschmidt (Liberal)
1845	Constant d'Hoffschmidt (Liberal)
1848	Constant d'Hoffschmidt (Liberal)
1852	Constant d'Hoffschmidt (Liberal)
1856	Jean-Pierre Lambin (Catholic)
1857	Jean-Pierre Lambin (Catholic)
1861	Emile Van Hoorde (Catholic)
1864	Emile Van Hoorde (Catholic)
1868	Hubert Schmitz (Liberal)
1870	Emile Van Hoorde (Catholic)
1874	Emile Van Hoorde (Catholic)
1878	Emile Van Hoorde (Catholic)
1882	Emile Van Hoorde (Catholic)
1886	Emile Van Hoorde (Catholic)
1890	Emile Van Hoorde (Catholic)
1892	Emile Van Hoorde (Catholic)
1894	Emile Van Hoorde (Catholic)
1898	Henry Delvaux de Fenffe (Catholic)
1900	Merged into Arlon-Marche-Bastogne
