= Benoît Piedboeuf =

Belgian politician (born 1959)

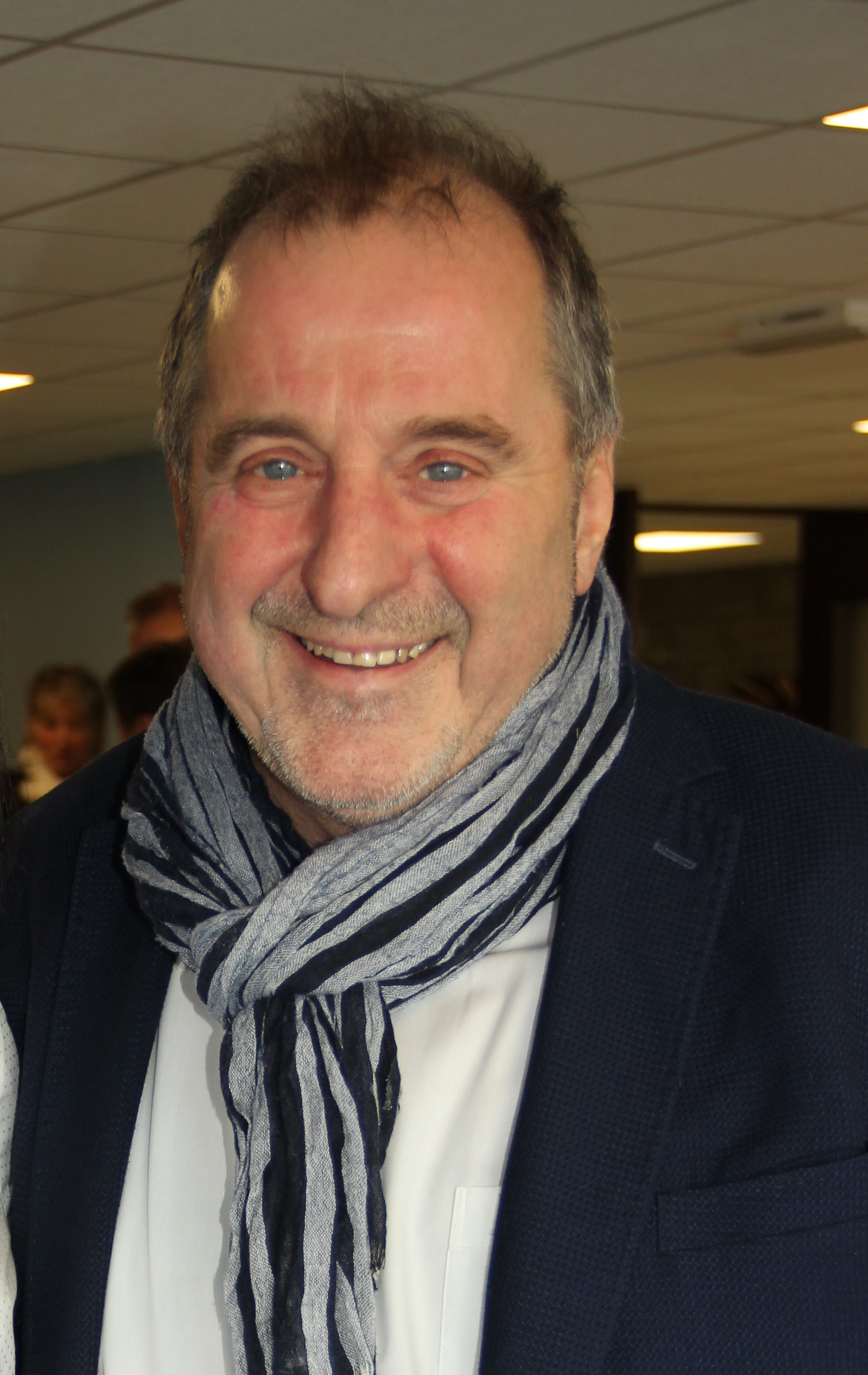
- Piedboeuf in 2019

Member of the Chamber of Representatives
- Incumbent
- Assumed office 19 June 2014
- Constituency: Luxembourg

Personal details
- Born: 6 April 1959 (age 67)
- Party: Reformist Movement

Benoît Piedboeuf (French pronunciation: [bənwa pjebœf]; born 6 April 1959) is a Belgian politician of the Reformist Movement. He has been a member of the Chamber of Representatives since 2014, and has served as group leader of the Reformist Movement since 2019. He has served as mayor of Tintigny since 1999.
