= Arlon-Marche-Bastogne (Chamber of Representatives constituency) =

Constituency in Belgium (1900-1991)

Arlon-Marche-Bastogne was a constituency used to elect members of the Belgian Chamber of Representatives between 1900 and 1991.

== Representatives ==
Election	Representative (Party)	Representative (Party)	Representative (Party)
1900	Formed from a merger of Arlon, Marche and Bastogne		
1900	Adolphe de Limburg Stirum (Catholic)	Emile François (Liberal)	Henry Delvaux de Fenffe (Catholic)
1904	Adolphe de Limburg Stirum (Catholic)	Emile François (Liberal)	Henry Delvaux de Fenffe (Catholic)
1908	Adolphe de Limburg Stirum (Catholic)	Camille Ozeray (Liberal)	Léon du Bus de Warnaffe (Catholic)
1912	Adolphe de Limburg Stirum (Catholic)	Camille Ozeray (Liberal)	Léon du Bus de Warnaffe (Catholic)
1919	Adolphe de Limburg Stirum (Catholic)	Camille Ozeray (Liberal)	Léon du Bus de Warnaffe (Catholic)
1921	Fernand Van den Corput (Catholic)	Camille Ozeray (Liberal)	Léon du Bus de Warnaffe (Catholic)
1925	Fernand Van den Corput (Catholic)	Albert Goffaux (PS)	Jean Merget (Catholic)
1929	Fernand Van den Corput (Catholic)	Albert Goffaux (PS)	Jean Merget (Catholic)
1932	Alphonse Materne (Catholic)	Albert Goffaux (PS)	Jean Merget (Catholic)
1936	Alphonse Collet (REX)	Albert Goffaux (PS)	Jean Merget (Catholic)
1939	Max Bourguignon (Catholic)	Albert Goffaux (PS)	Jean Merget (Catholic)
1946	Justin Gaspar (CVP)	Ernest Rongvaux (BSP)	Jean Merget (Catholic)
1949	Justin Gaspar (CVP)	Camille Decker (CVP)	Jean Merget (Catholic)
1950	Justin Gaspar (CVP)	Camille Decker (CVP)	Jean Merget (Catholic)
1954	Justin Gaspar (CVP)	Camille Decker (CVP)	Ernest Rongvaux (BSP)
1958	Justin Gaspar (CVP)	Camille Decker (CVP)	Ernest Rongvaux (BSP)
1961	Justin Gaspar (CVP)	Camille Decker (CVP)	Roger Lamers (BSP)
1965	Louis Olivier (PVV)	Camille Decker (CVP)	Roger Lamers (BSP)
1968	Louis Olivier (PVV)	Charles-Ferdinand Nothomb (CVP)	Marcel Rasquin (BSP)
1971	Louis Olivier (PVV)	Charles-Ferdinand Nothomb (CVP)	Marcel Remacle (PSB)
1974	Louis Olivier (PVV)	Charles-Ferdinand Nothomb (CVP)	Marcel Remacle (PSB)
1977	Louis Olivier (PVV)	Charles-Ferdinand Nothomb (CVP)	Marcel Remacle (PSB)
1978	Louis Olivier (PVV)	Charles-Ferdinand Nothomb (CVP)	Marcel Remacle (PS)
1981	Louis Olivier (PVV)	Charles-Ferdinand Nothomb (CVP)	Jacques Santkin (PS)
1985	Louis Olivier (PVV)	Charles-Ferdinand Nothomb (CVP)	Jacques Santkin (PS)
1988	Louis Olivier (PVV)	Charles-Ferdinand Nothomb (CVP)	Jacques Santkin (PS)
1991	Antoine Duquesne (PRL)	Charles-Ferdinand Nothomb (CVP)	Jacques Santkin (PS)
1995	Merged into Arlon-Marche-Bastogne-Neufchâteau-Virton		
