= Grandpré, Ardennes =

Commune in Grand Est, France

Grandpré
- Commune
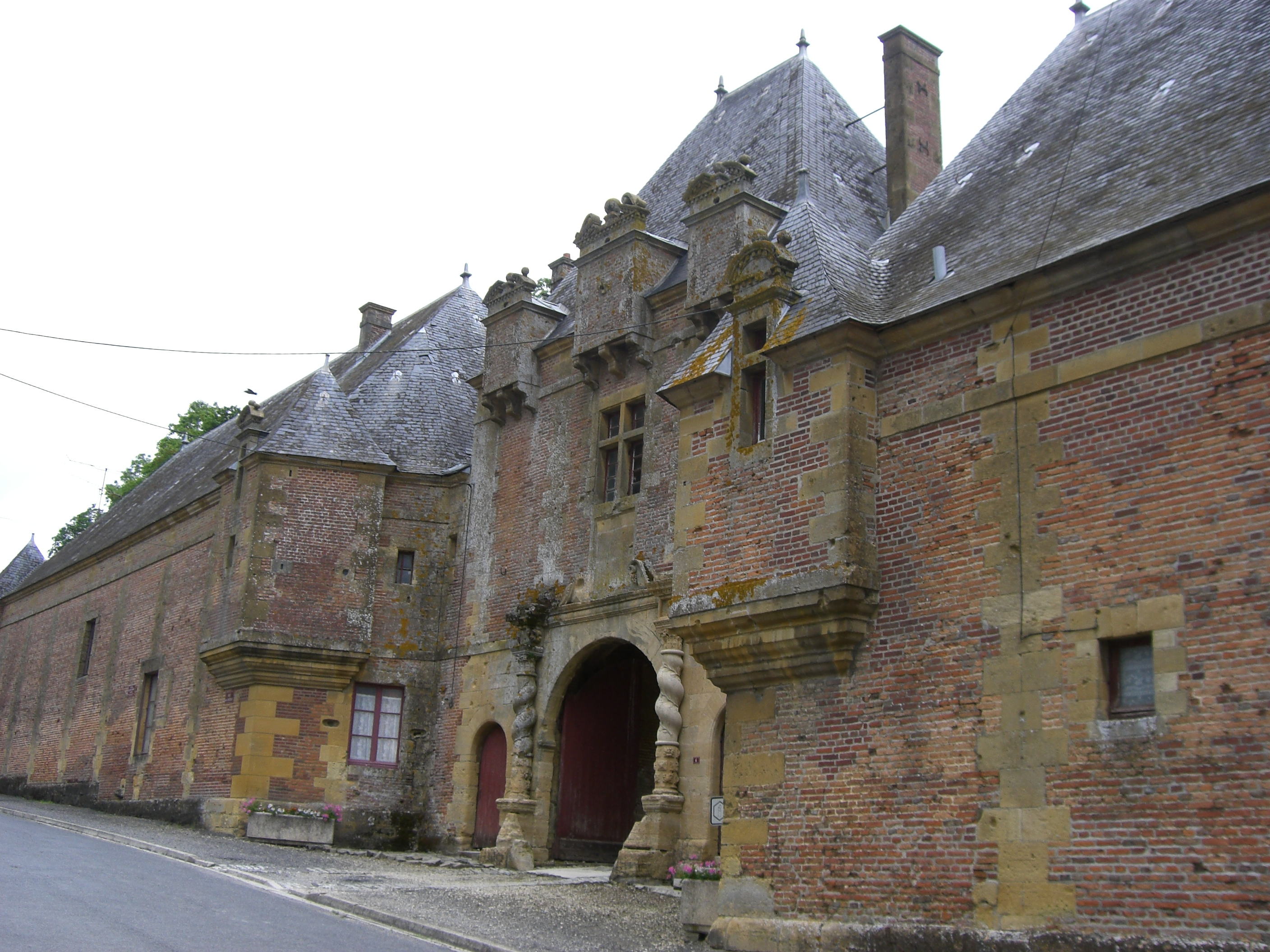
- Gates of Justice

- Coat of arms
- Location of Grandpré
- Location within France Location within Grand Est
- Coordinates: 49°20′29″N 4°52′14″E
- Country: France
- Region: Grand Est
- Department: Ardennes
- Arrondissement: Vouziers
- Canton: Attigny
- Intercommunality: Argonne Ardennaise

Government
  - Mayor (2020–2026): Francis Signoret
- Area^{1}: 42.54 km^{2} (16.42 sq mi)
- Elevation: 140 m (460 ft)
- Highest elevation: 253 m (830 ft)
- Lowest elevation: 107 m (351 ft)
- Population (2023): 503
  - Density: 11.8/km^{2} (30.6/sq mi)
- Time zone: UTC+01:00 (CET)
  - Summer (DST): UTC+02:00 (CEST)
- INSEE/Postal code: 08198 /08250
- ^{1} French Land Register data, which excludes lakes, ponds, glaciers > 1 km^{2} (0.386 sq mi or 247 acres) and river estuaries.

Grandpré (French pronunciation: [ɡʁɑ̃pʁe]) is a commune in the Ardennes department in northern France. On 1 January 2016, the former commune Termes was merged into Grandpré.

== Population ==
Historical population
Year	Pop.	±% p.a.
1968	767	—
1975	710	−1.10%
1982	702	−0.16%
1990	640	−1.15%
1999	656	+0.27%
2007	607	−0.97%
2012	589	−0.60%
2017	540	−1.72%
2023	503	−1.18%
Source: Population in geography as of January 2025, INSEE

== See also ==
- Communes of the Ardennes department
