= Neufchâteau (Chamber of Representatives constituency) =

Belgian political subdivision

Neufchâteau was a constituency used to elect a single member of the Belgian Chamber of Representatives between 1831 and 1900.

== Representatives ==
Election	Representative (Party)
1831	Léopold Zoude (Liberal)
1833	Léopold Zoude (Liberal)
1837	Léopold Zoude (Liberal)
1841	Léopold Zoude (Liberal)
1845	Léopold Zoude (Liberal)
1848	Louis Orban de Xivry (Catholic)
1852	Edouard De Moor (Liberal)
1856	Edouard De Moor (Liberal)
1857	Edouard De Moor (Liberal)
1861	Edouard De Moor (Liberal)
1864	Edouard De Moor (Liberal)
1868	Charles Camille Castilhon (Liberal)
1870	Edouard Santkin (Catholic)
1874	Edouard Santkin (Catholic)
1878	Charles Bergh (Liberal)
1882	Edmond van der Linden d'Hooghvorst (Catholic)
1886	Edmond van der Linden d'Hooghvorst (Catholic)
1890	Winand Heynen (Catholic)
1892	Winand Heynen (Catholic)
1894	Winand Heynen (Catholic)
1898	Winand Heynen (Catholic)
1900	Merged into Neufchâteau-Virton
