= Carmen Ramlot =

Belgian politician (born 1974)

Member of the Chamber of Representatives
- Incumbent
- Assumed office 18 July 2024
- Preceded by: Valérie Lescrenier
- Constituency: Luxembourg

Personal details
- Born: October 21
- Party: Les Engagés

Carmen Ramlot (born 21 October) is a Belgian politician serving as a member of the Chamber of Representatives since 2024. She has served as mayor of Rouvroy since 2010.
