= Pierre Joseph Dubois =

French general

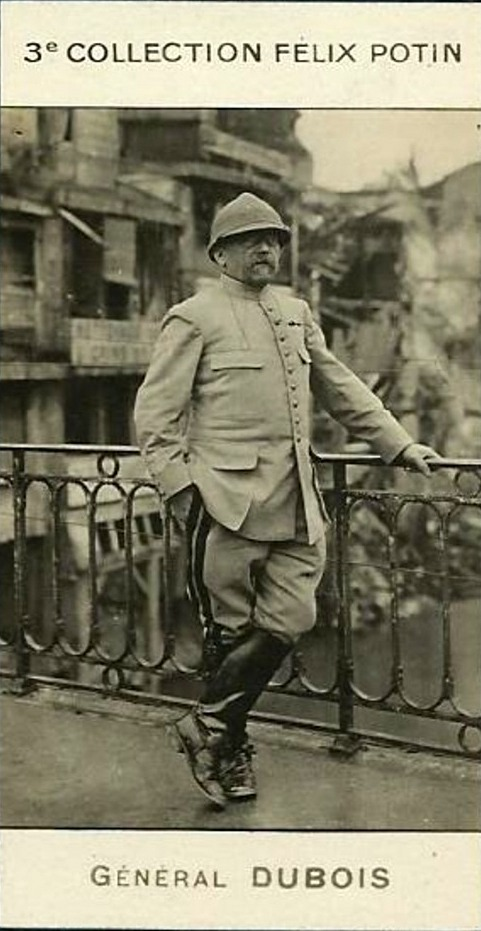
- General Dubois during WW I
- Born: 21 November 1852; Sedan, France
- Died: 17 January 1924 (aged 71); Tours, France
- Military career
- Allegiance: France
- Branch: French Army
- Service years: 1872-1917
- Rank: General de division
- Commands: 1st Cavalry Division; 9th Army Corps; French Sixth Army
- Conflicts: Pacification of Algeria; World War I
- Awards: Grand Officer of the Légion d'honneur Croix de guerre 1914–1918

Pierre Joseph Dubois (21 November 1852 – 17 January 1924) was a French World War I general.

== Education ==
Dubois entered the École spéciale militaire de Saint-Cyr in 1872, and on October 1, 1874, was commissioned as a second lieutenant in the cavalry.

== Military career and leadership ==
During his early years of military service, he participated in the Pacification of Algeria in 1882 and Tunisia in 1885.

He became commander of the 1st Cavalry Division in 1909 and at the start of World War I, he was at the head of the 9th Army Corps. He fought in the Battles of the Marne and Ypres before coming commander of the French Sixth Army between March 1915 and February 1916, when he was put into reserve.

In June 1916 he received a new assignment as Commander of the 5th Military Region in Orléans. Put on the reserve list again in April 1917, he was reactivated in the summer of 1917 for a few months and took over the command of the 11th Military Region in Nantes. Here he prepared for the arrival of American troops in the ports of Brest and Saint-Nazaire.

== Sources ==
- First World War Retrieved: 8 June 2019.
