= Virton (Chamber of Representatives constituency) =

Belgian political subdivision

Virton was a constituency used to elect a single member of the Belgian Chamber of Representatives between 1845 and 1900.

== Representatives ==
Election	Representative (Party)
1845	Edouard d'Huart (Catholic)
1848	Jean-Baptiste Pierre (Liberal)
1852	Jean-Baptiste Pierre (Liberal)
1856	Jean-Baptiste Pierre (Liberal)
1857	Jean-Baptiste Pierre (Liberal)
1861	Philippe Bouvier (Liberal)
1864	Philippe Bouvier (Liberal)
1868	Philippe Bouvier (Liberal)
1870	Albert de Briey (Catholic)
1874	Louis de Briey (Catholic)
1878	Philippe Bouvier (Liberal)
1882	Numa Ensch-Tesch (Liberal)
1886	Emmanuel de Briey (Catholic)
1890	Emmanuel de Briey (Catholic)
1892	Emmanuel de Briey (Catholic)
1894	Georges Lorand (Liberal)
1898	Georges Lorand (Liberal)
1900	Merged into Neufchâteau-Virton
