= Prosnes =

- Commune
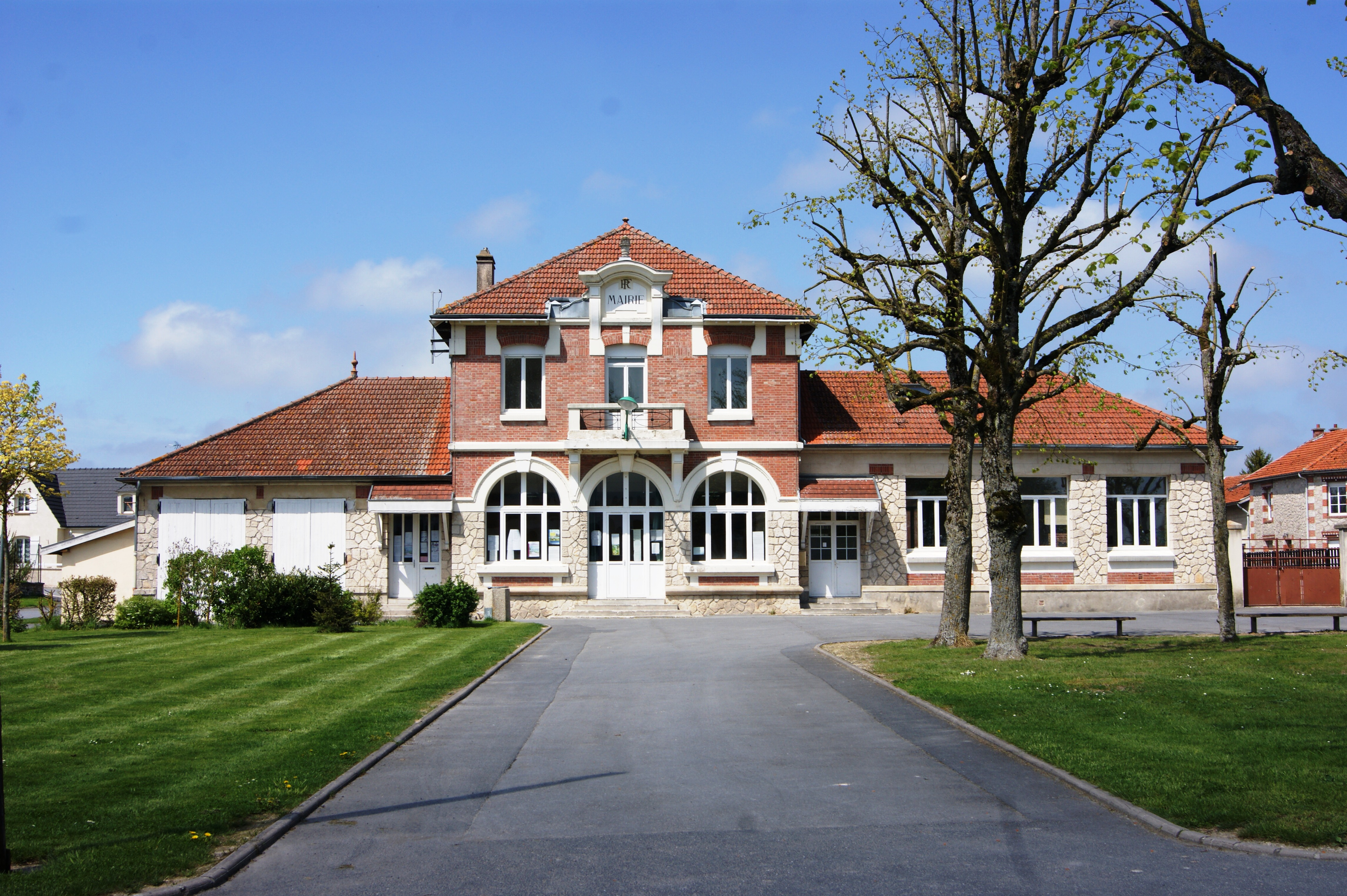
- The town hall in Prosnes
- Location of Prosnes
- Location within France Location within Grand Est
- Coordinates: 49°11′25″N 4°17′28″E
- Country: France
- Region: Grand Est
- Department: Marne
- Arrondissement: Reims
- Canton: Mourmelon-Vesle et Monts de Champagne
- Intercommunality: CU Grand Reims

Government
  - Mayor (2020–2026): Francis Munier
- Area^{1}: 32.79 km^{2} (12.66 sq mi)
- Elevation: 107 m (351 ft)
- Population (2023): 486
  - Density: 14.8/km^{2} (38.4/sq mi)
- Time zone: UTC+01:00 (CET)
  - Summer (DST): UTC+02:00 (CEST)
- INSEE/Postal code: 51447 /51400
- ^{1} French Land Register data, which excludes lakes, ponds, glaciers > 1 km^{2} (0.386 sq mi or 247 acres) and river estuaries.

Prosnes (French pronunciation: [pʁon]) is a commune in the Marne department in north-eastern France.

== History ==
Around sixty Gaulish burials were excavated in the mid-19th century, revealing both pottery and jewellery.

The village suffered extensive damage during the First World War.

== See also ==
- Communes of the Marne department
