= 1854 Belgian general election =

← 1852	13 June 1854	1856 →

54 of the 108 seats in the Chamber of Representatives 55 seats needed for a majority
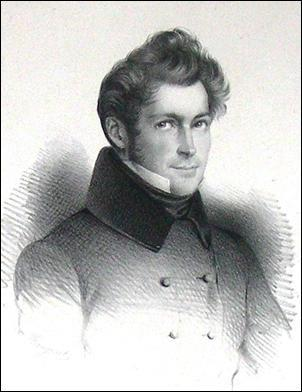

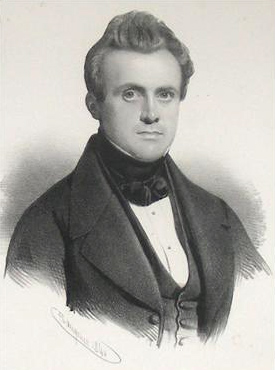
	First party	Second party
Leader	Henri de Brouckère	Pierre de Decker
Party	Liberal	Catholic
Leader since	Candidate for PM	Candidate for PM
Seats before	57 seats	51 seats
Seats won	28	26
Seats after	54	54
Seat change	▼3	▲3
Popular vote	16,087	11,921
Percentage	57.44%	42.56%
Government before election
de Brouckère
Liberal
Government after election
de Brouckère
Liberal

Partial general elections were held in Belgium on 13 June 1854. In the elections for the Chamber of Representatives the Liberal Party and the Catholics won 54 seats each. Voter turnout was 61%, although only 45,884 people were eligible to vote.

Under the alternating system, elections were only held in five out of the nine provinces: Antwerp, Brabant, Luxembourg, Namur, and West Flanders.

== Results ==
=== Chamber of Representatives ===
Party	Votes	%	Seats		
Party	Votes	%	Won	Total	+/–
Liberal Party	16,087	57.44	28	54	–3
Catholics	11,921	42.56	26	54	+3
Total	28,008	100.00	54	108	0
Total votes	28,008	–			
Registered voters/turnout	45,884	61.04			
Source: Mackie & Rose, Sternberger et al.
