= Émile Laure =

French general (1881–1957)

Auguste Marie Émile Laure
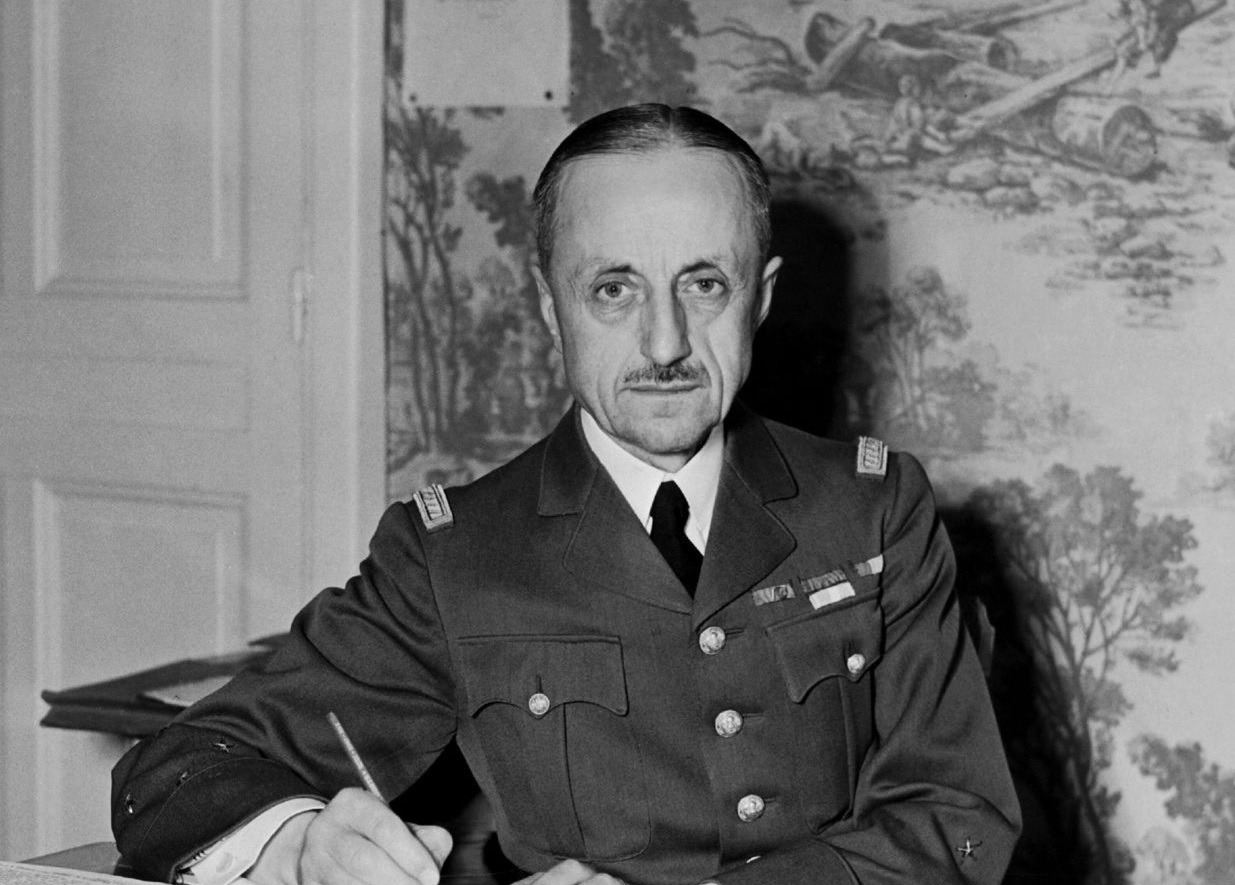
- Born: 3 June 1881; Apt, Vaucluse, France
- Died: 1957 (aged 75–76); Hyères
- Spouse: Eugénie Marguerite Degasquet (married in Draguignan on 27 September 1908)
- Children: 2
- Military career
- Allegiance: France, Vichy France
- Branch: French Army
- Rank: Général d'armée (Army general)
- Commands: Division d'Alger; 9e Corps d'Armée; VIII^{e} Armée
- Other work: Secretary-General to the Head of State (Philippe Pétain) under Vichy France

Auguste Marie Émile Laure (3 June 1881 – 1957) was a French general

He was born on 3 June 1881 in Apt, Vaucluse, France. His father was Jacques Ernest Laure (Ingénieur des Arts et Manufactures). His mother was Marguerite Marie Louise Duval. He died in Hyères in 1957. He married Eugénie Marguerite Degasquet in Draguignan on 27 September 1908.

Just prior to World War II, he commanded the 9th Military Region. At the time of the outbreak of World War II, he commanded 9^{e} Corps d'Armée. At the Fall of France, he commanded 8th Army until his capture. After his release, he served the Vichy government as Secretary-General to the Head of State until April 1942.

In 1940, he was the commanding officer of the VIII^{e} Armée on the Lorraine front.

He was imprisoned in La Bresse, with four other generals, on 22 June 1940.

Freed following the intervention of Marshal Philippe Pétain, Laure became secretary general of the office of the head of state (secrétaire général du cabinet du chef de l'État) on 15 November 1940 and, in December, secretary general of the Légion française des combattants (LFC), the Vichy veterans organization, replacing Xavier Vallat. He left this position in 1942 after the return of Pierre Laval to the government. He was arrested by the Germans in December 1943 and deported to Germany. He was not released until May 1945.

He was tried in the Épuration légale (French: "legal purge") anti-collaborator trials that followed World War II in France. He was acquitted on 2 July 1948.

His son, René Laure, also became a general in the French army. Another son, Henri Laure, became an admiral.

== Publications ==
- Under the pseudonym Henri-René, Au 3^{e} Bureau du troisième GQG (1917-1919), Plon, Paris, 1921, 279 pages.
- Pétain, biographie du maréchal jusqu'à la capitulation, Berger-Levrault, 1942, 442 pages
