= Édouard Réquin =

French military officer

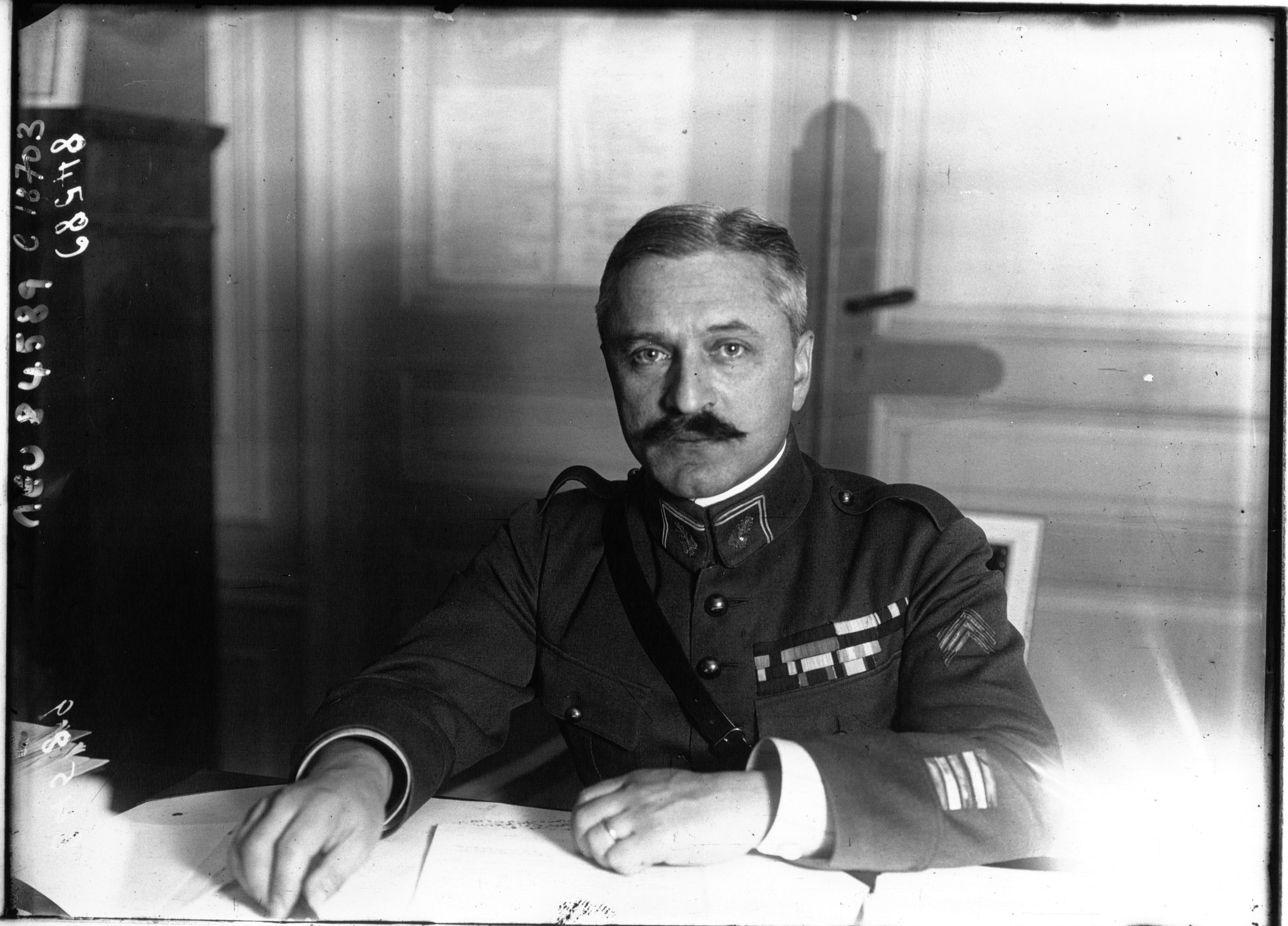
Lieutenant-Colonel Réquin in October 1920.

Édouard-Jean Réquin (13 July 1879 – 2 January 1953) was a French military officer.

== Early life ==
Réquin was born in Rouen and joined the French Army at the tail end of the nineteenth century.

== Career ==
From 1900 through 1911 he served in North Africa. In the First World War he was a member of the General Staff of Marshals Joseph Joffre and Ferdinand Foch from 1916 to 1918. A portrait of Réquin in military uniform was made by Kees van Dongen in 1916.

From 1917 to 1918, after promotion to the rank of Lieutenant Colonel, he was part of the French military delegation to Washington, D. C. In the summer of 1918 Réquin promoted the French Army's policy of racial integration, impressing some American military officials with his depiction of the situation in the French Army where whites and blacks served side by side and were cared for in the same hospitals and by the same personnel; they had his report La Course de l'Amérique à la Victoire published in English as America's Race to Victory (1919). In 1919 he was a technical counselor at Versailles Peace Conference, and later author of Projet de Traité d'Assistance Mutuelle (1924). From 1930 he was French Military Representative at the League of Nations, and 1930–1932 Chief of Cabinet of Ministry of War.

In 1938 he became a member of France's Supreme War Council, then in World War II he was a general, from 2 September 1939 to 6 July 1940 he commanded the 4th French Army against the German invasion of France.

In 1941 he retired, and in 1945 became President of the Société de la Légion d'Honneur. He published three further works: Combats pour l'Honneur, a study on General Louis Archinard in the Sudan, Archinard et le Soudan (both 1946) and his memoirs D'une guerre à l'autre 1919–1939 (1949).
