= Tintigny =

Municipality in Wallonia, Belgium

Tintigny Tintnî (Walloon)
- Municipality
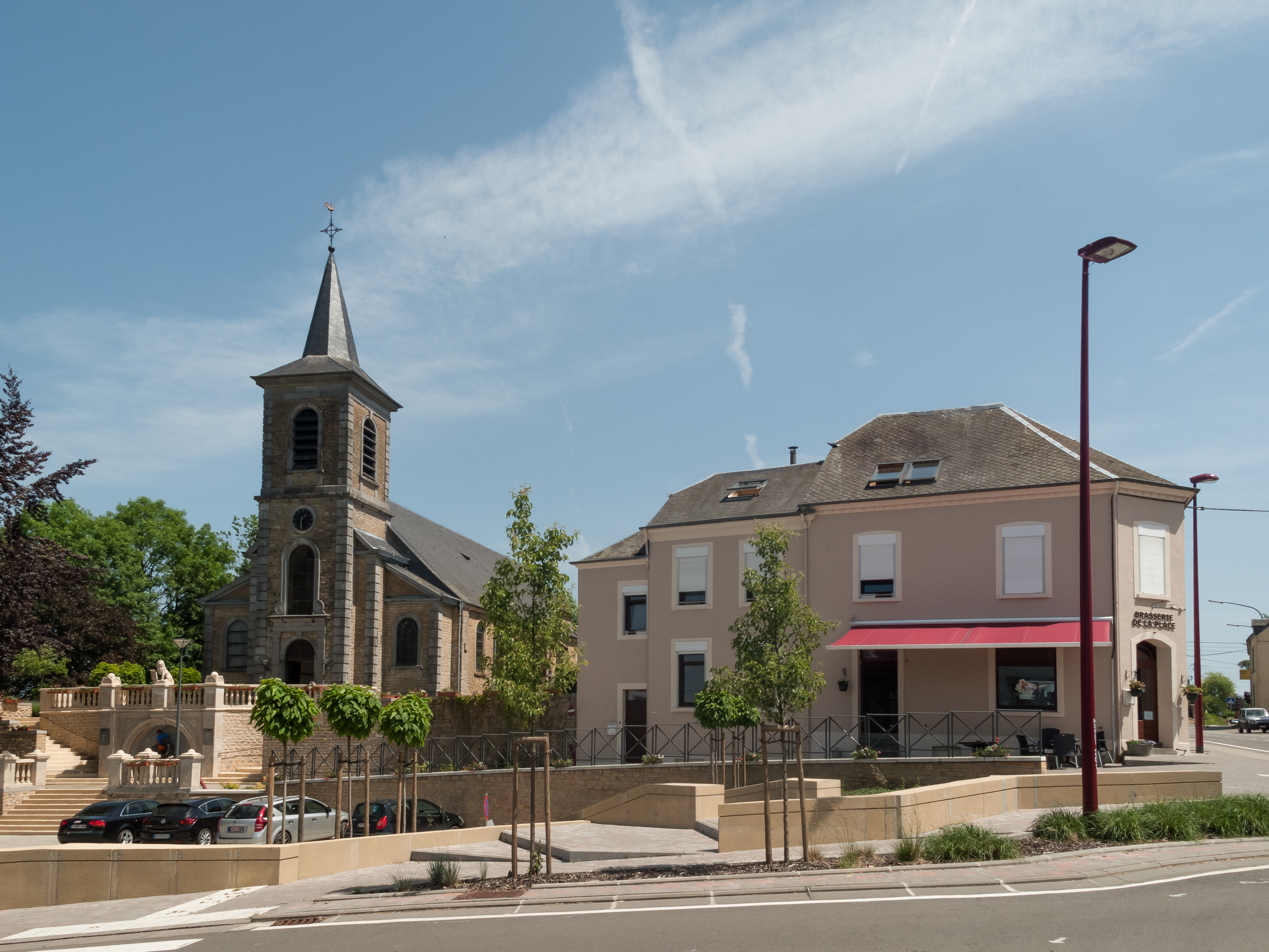

- Flag Coat of arms

- Location of Tintigny in Luxembourg province
- Interactive map of Tintigny
- Location in Belgium
- Coordinates: 49°40′56″N 05°31′01″E
- Country: Belgium
- Community: French Community
- Region: Wallonia
- Province: Luxembourg
- Arrondissement: Virton

Government
  - Mayor: Benoît Piedbœuf
  - Governing party: Commune en Vie (MR)

Area
  - Total: 81.88 km^{2} (31.61 sq mi)

Population (2018-01-01)
  - Total: 4,276
  - Density: 52.22/km^{2} (135.3/sq mi)
- Postal codes: 6730
- NIS code: 85039
- Area codes: 063
- Website: (in French) www.tintigny.be

Tintigny (French pronunciation: [tɛ̃tiɲi]; Walloon: Tintnî) is a municipality of Wallonia located in the province of Luxembourg, Belgium.

On 1 January 2015 the municipality had 4,200 inhabitants. Its total area is 81.79 km^{2}, giving it a population density of 45.7 inhabitants per km^{2}.

The municipality consists of the following districts: Bellefontaine, Rossignol, Saint-Vincent, and Tintigny. Other population centers include Ansart, Breuvanne, Han, Lahage, and Poncelle.

== History ==
Three-quarters of the village of Tintigny was burned down on August 22, 1914: 183 houses in the village were destroyed. These facts are attributable in particular to the 38th IR and 51st IR of the German Imperial Army. Falsely accused of being snipers, 93 local residents were killed.

On the same day, at Rossignol, one of the great disasters of the Battle of the Borders took place during the fighting at Rossignol: the 3rd French colonial infantry division, an elite corps made up mostly of volunteers who had already seen fire, was surrounded and annihilated by the XI and XII Infantry Divisions of the German VI Silesian Corps. Ernest Psichari, killed in this battle, rests in the military cemetery of Rossignol3. Despite their victory, the Germans, exhausted by this battle slowing them down in their advance towards Paris, attacked the population. They deported 120 inhabitants of Rossignol and neighboring villages and shot them in Arlon on August 26, 1914, at the current Place des Fusillés, named after them in their memory.

== See also ==
- List of protected heritage sites in Tintigny
