= Termes, Ardennes =

Termes
- Part of Grandpré
- Location of Termes
- Location within France Location within Grand Est
- Coordinates: 49°19′26″N 4°49′29″E
- Country: France
- Region: Grand Est
- Department: Ardennes
- Arrondissement: Vouziers
- Canton: Attigny
- Commune: Grandpré
- Area^{1}: 13.98 km^{2} (5.40 sq mi)
- Elevation: 120 m (390 ft)
- Highest elevation: 223 m (732 ft)
- Lowest elevation: 102 m (335 ft)
- Population (2023): 121
  - Density: 8.66/km^{2} (22.4/sq mi)
- Time zone: UTC+01:00 (CET)
  - Summer (DST): UTC+02:00 (CEST)
- Postal code: 08250
- ^{1} French Land Register data, which excludes lakes, ponds, glaciers > 1 km^{2} (0.386 sq mi or 247 acres) and river estuaries.

Termes (French pronunciation: [tɛʁm]) is a former commune in the Ardennes department in northern France. On 1 January 2016, it was merged into the commune Grandpré.

== See also ==
- Communes of the Ardennes department
