= Jacques Gennen =

Belgium politician (born 1948)

Jacques Gennen (born 23 January 1948) is a Belgian politician. He is a member of the Socialist Party (PS). He was a Member of Walloon Parliament representing Arlon, Bastogne, and Marche from 20 July 2004 to 7 June 2009. Prior to that he was the Mayor of Vielsalm. He trained as a barrister at Université catholique de Louvain.
