= Ernest Adam =

Belgian politician (1899–1985)

Ernest Marie Adam

Personal details
- Born: 8 November 1899 Lamorteau, Belgium
- Died: 5 August 1985 (aged 85) Thiaumont, Belgium

Ernest Marie Adam (8 November 1899 – 5 August 1985) was a Belgian politician. He was a member of the Chamber of Representatives and was senator of Belgium.
