= Signy-l'Abbaye =

- Commune
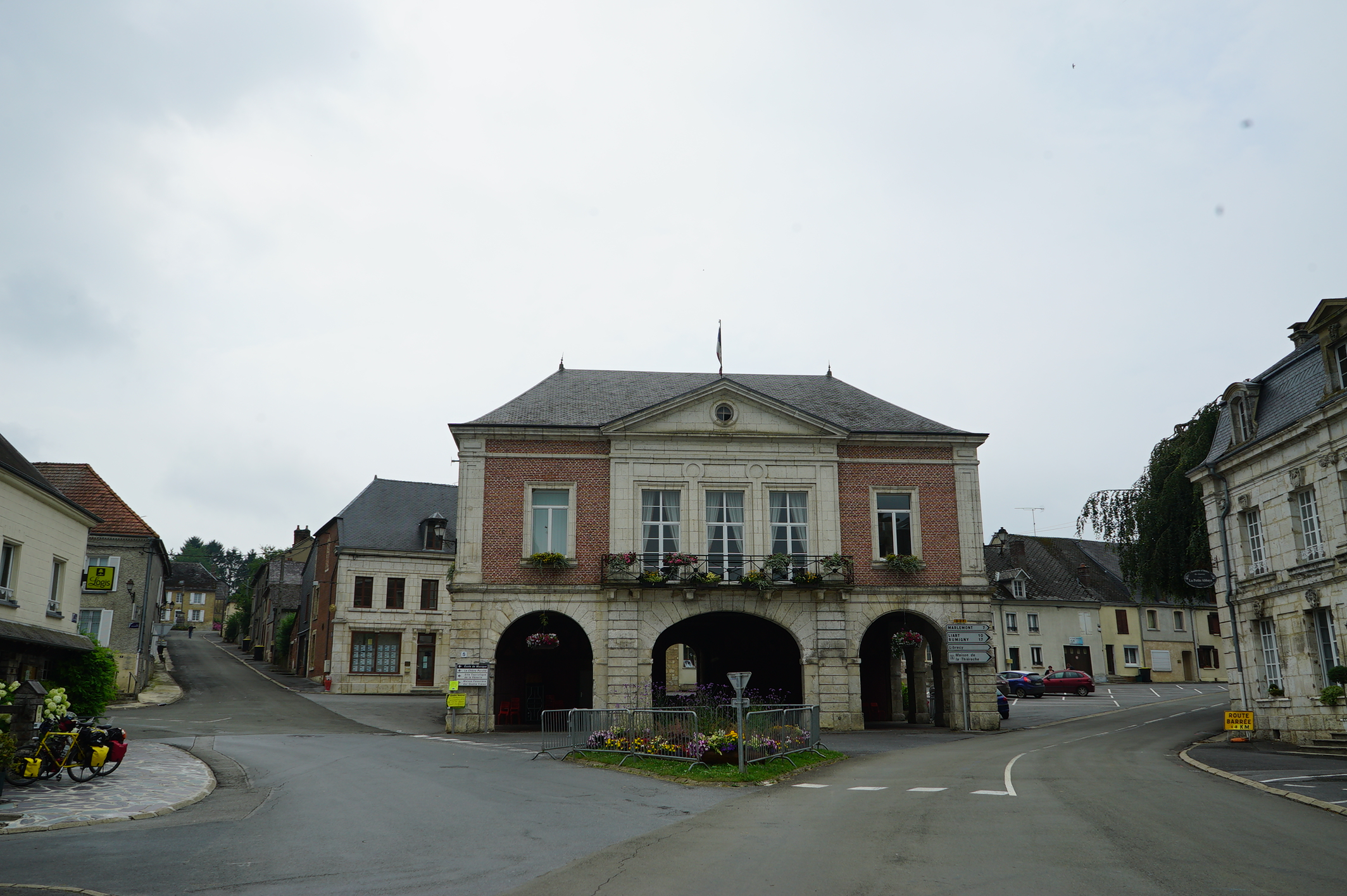
- The town hall in Signy-l'Abbaye

- Coat of arms
- Location of Signy-l'Abbaye
- Location within France Location within Grand Est
- Coordinates: 49°41′54″N 4°25′16″E
- Country: France
- Region: Grand Est
- Department: Ardennes
- Arrondissement: Charleville-Mézières
- Canton: Signy-l'Abbaye
- Intercommunality: Crêtes Préardennaises

Government
  - Mayor (2020–2026): Jean-Paul Dosière
- Area^{1}: 62.03 km^{2} (23.95 sq mi)
- Elevation: 155 m (509 ft)
- Population (2023): 1,344
  - Density: 21.67/km^{2} (56.12/sq mi)
- Time zone: UTC+01:00 (CET)
  - Summer (DST): UTC+02:00 (CEST)
- INSEE/Postal code: 08419 /08460
- ^{1} French Land Register data, which excludes lakes, ponds, glaciers > 1 km^{2} (0.386 sq mi or 247 acres) and river estuaries.

Signy-l'Abbaye (French pronunciation: [siɲi labe.i]) is a commune in the department of Ardennes, in the north-eastern French region of Grand Est.

== Geography ==
The river Vaux, a small tributary of the Aisne, flows through the commune.

== Population ==
Historical population
Year	Pop.	±% p.a.
1968	1,711	—
1975	1,672	−0.33%
1982	1,493	−1.60%
1990	1,422	−0.61%
1999	1,340	−0.66%
2007	1,363	+0.21%
2012	1,351	−0.18%
2017	1,363	+0.18%
2023	1,344	−0.23%
Source: INSEE

== See also ==
- Communes of the Ardennes department
