= Philippe Courard =

Belgian politician (born 1966)

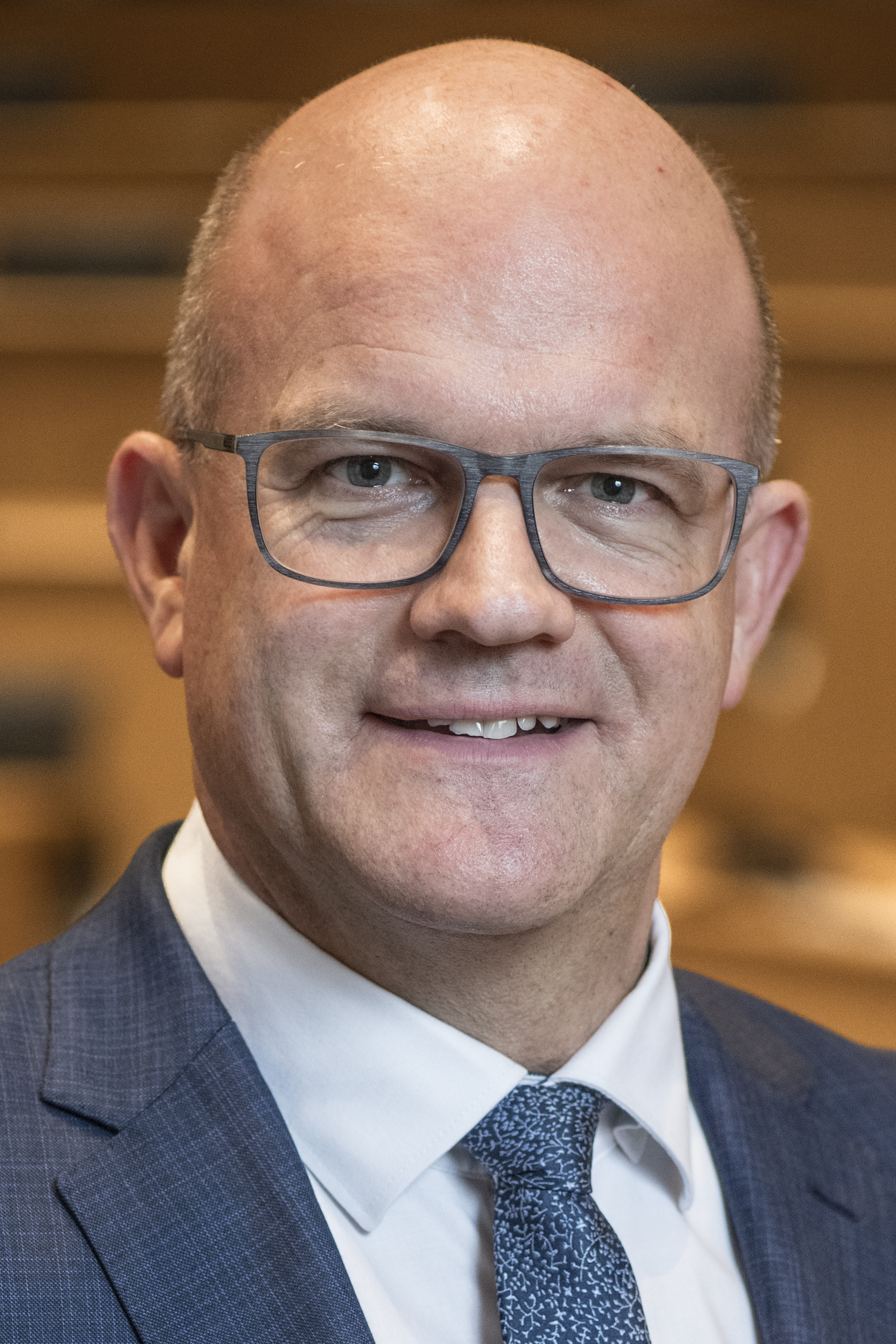
- Courard in 2021

Member of the Chamber of Representatives
- Incumbent
- Assumed office 10 July 2024
- Constituency: Luxembourg
- In office 6 July 2010 – 6 December 2011
- Succeeded by: André Perpète
- Constituency: Luxembourg

Member of the Senate
- In office 8 October 2019 – 17 May 2024
- Preceded by: Christie Morreale

Speaker of the Parliament of the French Community
- In office 11 November 2014 – 17 September 2019
- Preceded by: Jean-Charles Luperto
- Succeeded by: Rudy Demotte

Personal details
- Born: 2 September 1966 (age 59)
- Party: Socialist Party

Philippe Courard (born 2 September 1966) is a Belgian politician of the Socialist Party. Since 2024, he has been a member of the Chamber of Representatives. He served as speaker of the Parliament of the French Community from 2014 to 2019, and was a member of the Senate from 2019 to 2024. He was a member of the government of Wallonia from 2003 to 2009, and a member of the federal government from 2009 to 2014.
