= Josy Arens =

Belgian politician (1952–2024)

Member of the Chamber of Representatives of Belgium
- In office 20 June 2019 – 27 May 2024
- In office 23 August 2001 – 28 April 2014
- In office 3 October 1995 – 5 May 1999

Member of the Parliament of Wallonia
- In office 25 May 2014 – 25 May 2019

Member of the Parliament of the French Community
- In office 17 June 2014 – 25 May 2019

Mayor of Attert
- In office 1995 – 10 December 2024

Personal details
- Born: Joseph Arens; 30 May 1952 Arlon, Belgium
- Died: 10 December 2024 (aged 72)
- Party: LE
- Occupation: Farmer

Joseph "Josy" Arens (30 May 1952 – 10 December 2024) was a Belgian politician of Les Engagés (LE).

Arens served as mayor of Attert from 1995 until his death and concurrently served in the Parliament of the French Community and the Parliament of Wallonia from 2014 to 2019. He was also a member of the Chamber of Representatives from 1995 to 1999, 2001 to 2014, and 2019 to 2024.

Arens died on 10 December 2024, at the age of 72.

== Decorations ==
- Knight of the Order of Leopold
- Knight of the Order of Merit of the Grand Duchy of Luxembourg
