= 1837 Belgian general election =

← 1835	13 June 1837	1839 →

51 of the 102 seats in the Chamber of Representatives
Government before election
de Theux de Meylandt I
Catholic-Liberal
Government after election
de Theux de Meylandt I
Catholic-Liberal

Partial general elections were held in Belgium on Tuesday 13 June 1837 in which 51 of the 102 seats in the Chamber of Representatives were elected. Voter turnout was 56.0%, although only 24,526 people were eligible to vote. Under the alternating system, Chamber elections were only held in five out of the nine provinces: Antwerp, Brabant, Luxembourg, Namur and West Flanders. The Senate was not up for election.

This was the last election in which Luxembourg Province included the area of the modern Grand Duchy of Luxembourg; in 1839, under the stipulations of the Treaty of London, a portion of the province's constituency of Diekirch, along with the full constituencies of Luxembourg (roughly equal to modern Luxembourg City) and Grevenmacher, became parts of the independent Grand Duchy of Luxembourg.
