= Belgium national football team home stadium =

Throughout their history, the Belgium national team have played at 24 home locations in 12 urban areas, most often in the country's Capital Region, Brussels. The national King Baudouin Stadium, with a capacity of 50,024 people, is the usual playing ground nowadays. At this location, the majority of the Red Devils' home matches took place. Other stadiums (with a smaller capacity) are normally assigned as home ground in case a rather small audience is to be expected or when the national stadium is in repair.

== History ==
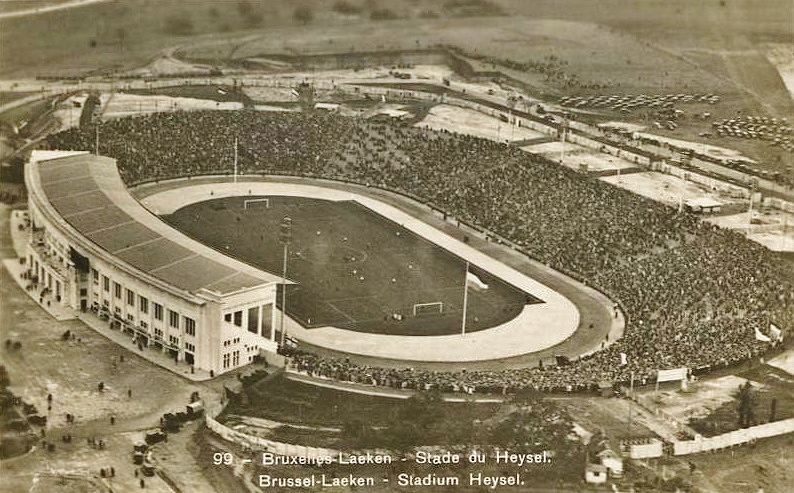
The Jubilee Stadium on the Heysel/Heizel Plateau in 1935

Belgium's first official match in 1904 was a home game, at the Stade du Vivier d'Oie in Uccle. Before their first official match in the national Jubilee Stadium in Brussels in 1931, the Red Devils made 67 home appearances in the current urban areas of Antwerp, Brussels, Liège, Seraing and Verviers. In that era, Antwerp and its surroundings often hosted the Belgian home matches (32 times), mostly explained by the frequent confrontations against the national team of Antwerp's neighbouring country Netherlands, and the 1920 Olympics football tournament held at the Olympisch Stadion (the "Kiel").

From 1931 on, the large majority of the home games have been played in the stadium on the Heysel/Heizel Plateau in Brussels. Inaugurated as "Jubilee Stadium" in 1930 with an unofficial match against Netherlands, and renamed "Heysel Stadium" in 1946, it underwent a drastical transformation in 1995. From then on, the stadium was named after the late King Baudouin I. Also over the totality of home games since 1904, the location of the current King Baudouin Stadium accounts for the majority of home games played. In May 2013, it was announced that the King Baudouin Stadium would be demolished to create place for housing and that a new stadium would arise nearby at the Heysel. In December of that year the involved parties agreed that this new stadium would no longer contain an athletic track as is currently the case. However, the plans for the new stadium were shelved when no building permit for it was awarded.

Some Belgian home stadiums have served as background for major tournaments when they hosted the 1920 Olympics (including its football tournament) and the 1972 and 2000 European Championships. In September 2014 Brussels was assigned as one of the 13 host cities for the 2020 European Championship, with an upcoming new stadium ("Eurostadium") as venue for four tournament matches. However, the UEFA later awarded the games to the Wembley Stadium when delays were causing uncertainty whether the new stadium in Brussels would be completed in time.

== List of home stadiums ==
Some stadiums were given different names at different times; only the official name at the last time the national team played is mentioned below. Statistics include official FIFA-recognised matches only; (Note: Note that the home friendly against Luxembourg at the Cristal Arena on 26 May 2014 is not FIFA-recognised due to an excessive number of substitutions.) unofficial games can be found here.

Defunct stadium
Stadium still in use, but no longer for (professional) football

Number of matches	Stadium	City area (town/quarter)	First international	Opponent	Last international	Opponent
224	King Baudouin Stadium	Brussels* (City of Brussels)	11 October 1931	Poland	9 June 2025	Wales
40	Bosuilstadion	Antwerp (Deurne)	1 November 1923	England	12 October 1988	Brazil
29	Constant Vanden Stock Stadium	Brussels* (Anderlecht)	27 October 1965	Bulgaria	7 September 2025	Kazakhstan
20	Stade Maurice Dufrasne	Liège (Sclessin)	2 January 1927	Czechoslovakia	18 November 2025	Liechtenstein
15	Olympisch Stadion	Antwerp (Kiel)	29 August 1920	Spain	7 September 2005	San Marino
12	Edmond Machtens Stadium	Brussels* (Sint-Jans-Molenbeek)	21 May 1921	England	22 April 1995	United States
10	Beerschot Stadion	Antwerp (Kiel)	30 April 1905	Netherlands	15 March 1914	Netherlands
7	Stade du Vivier d'Oie	Brussels* (Uccle)	1 May 1904	France	9 March 1919	France
6	Den Dreef	Leuven (Heverlee)	11 November 2020	Switzerland	15 November 2023	Serbia
5	Longchamps	Brussels* (Uccle)	18 April 1908	England	17 July 1920	England
5	Albert Dyserynck Stadion	Bruges (Sint-Andries)	22 October 1966	Switzerland	1 June 1974	Scotland
4	Parc Duden	Brussels* (Forest)	6 March 1921	France	11 May 1929	England
4	Stade Vélodrome de Rocourt	Liège (Rocourt)	15 April 1922	Denmark	14 May 1939	Switzerland
4	Stade du Pays de Charleroi	Charleroi	23 February 1946	Luxembourg	4 September 2004	Lithuania
4	Jan Breydel Stadium	Bruges (Sint-Andries)	23 August 1989	Denmark	14 November 2017	Japan
4	Cristal Arena	Genk (Waterschei)	24 May 2006	Turkey	23 March 2025	Ukraine
3	Jules Ottenstadion	Ghent (Gentbrugge)	11 June 2003	Andorra	9 February 2011	Finland
2	Stadion aan de Broodstraat	Antwerp (Kiel)	20 February 1912	Switzerland	23 November 1913	Germany
2	Stade du Panorama	Verviers	2 November 1913	Switzerland	7 November 1971	Luxembourg
2	Stade du Pont d'Ougrée	Seraing (Ougrée)	13 December 1925	Austria	25 May 1930	France
1	Cointe	Liège (Cointe)	23 April 1911	Germany	23 April 1911	Germany
1	Rue du Forest	Brussels* (Forest)	30 April 1911	France	30 April 1911	France
1	Regenboogstadion	Waregem	9 October 1968	Finland	9 October 1968	Finland
1	Daknamstadion	Lokeren (Daknam)	20 September 1978	Norway	20 September 1978	Norway
1	Planet Group Arena	Ghent	10 October 2025	North Macedonia	10 October 2025	North Macedonia
385	24 locations	12 urban regions	1 May 1904	France	18 November 2025	Liechtenstein

*"Brussels" does not refer to the City of Brussels, but the entire Brussels Capital Region. The towns between brackets are independent municipalities within this region.
