= Vreven =

Vreven is a surname. Notable people with the surname include:

- Alfred Vreven (1937–2000), Belgian politician
- Stijn Vreven (born 1973), Belgian footballer and manager
