= Party for Freedom and Progress =

Defunct Belgian political party

- French name: Parti de la Liberté et du Progrès
- Dutch name: Partij voor Vrijheid en Vooruitgang
- German name: Partei für Freiheit und Fortschritt
- Founded: 1961
- Dissolved: 1992
- Preceded by: Liberal Party
- Succeeded by: Flemish Liberals and Democrats, Liberal Reformist Party; Perspectives. Freedom. Progress.
- Ideology: Liberalism; Classical liberalism
- Political position: Centre-right
- European affiliation: European Liberal Democrat and Reform Party
- European Parliament group: Liberal Democrat and Reform
- International affiliation: Liberal International

The Party for Freedom and Progress (Dutch: Partij voor Vrijheid en Vooruitgang; (Note: Dutch pronunciation: [pɑrˈtɛi voːr ˈvrɛiɦɛit ɛɱ voːrˈœytxɑŋ].) French: Parti de la Liberté et du Progrès; (Note: French pronunciation: [paʁti d(ə) la libɛʁte e dy pʁɔɡʁɛ].) German: Partei für Freiheit und Fortschritt; (Note: German pronunciation: [paʁˈtaɪ fyːɐ̯ ˈfʁaɪhaɪt ʔʊnt ˈfɔʁt.ʃʁɪt].) PVV-PLP) was a liberal political party in Belgium which existed from 1961 until 1992. The party was the successor of the Liberal Party, which had roots dating back to 1846. It was succeeded in the Flemish Community of Belgium by the Flemish Liberals and Democrats (VLD) and in the French Community by the Liberal Reformist Party, Parti des Réformes et des Libertés de Wallonie and the current-day Reformist Movement. In the German-speaking Community, it continued to exist as the Party for Freedom and Progress up to 2023.

== History ==
=== Foundation of a new party ===
In 1961, Omer Vanaudenhove, leader of the Liberal Party, reorganised it into the Partij voor Vrijheid en Vooruitgang/Parti de la Liberté et du Progrès (PVV/PLP). The new party, among other things, jettisoned the Liberals' traditional anti-clericalism. In 1965, the party obtained a victory in the general elections with 21.6% of the votes. In 1966, the PVV joined the government of Paul Vanden Boeynants. The liberal ministers during this period were Willy De Clercq, Jacques Van Offelen, Frans Grootjans, Herman Vanderpoorten, Charles Poswick and August De Winter.

=== Separation between PVV and PRL ===
On 27 June 1971, the party was split up in a Flemish (PVV) and Walloon party (the Liberal Reformist Party, PRL). Only a few months later, on 24 September 1971, the parliament was dissolved. In the elections which followed The Flemish PVV gained votes, but the Walloon PRL lost in the elections.

In this period (1971–1992), the PVV ministers in the government were: Willy De Clercq, Herman Vanderpoorten, Herman De Croo, Karel Poma, Alfred Vreven, André Kempinaire, Guy Verhofstadt, Louis Waltniel, Jean Pede, Patrick Dewael, Ward Beysen, and Jacky Buchmann.

The PRL ministers in the government were: André Damseaux, François-Xavier de Donnea, Jean Gol, Louis Olivier, Charles Poswick, and Michel Toussaint.

=== Flanders: VLD ===
In Flanders, the PVV ceased to exist in 1992. On 15 November 1992, the Flemish Liberals and Democrats (VLD) was founded.

=== French-speaking Community: MR ===
In 1976, the name of the party was changed into Parti des Réformes et des Libertés de Wallonie|Parti de Réformes et de la Liberté en Wallonie (PRLW). In 1979, the name was changed to Liberal Reformist Party (PRL) after the merger with the Liberal Party of Brussels. In March 2002, the PRL merged with the German-speaking Party for Freedom and Progress (PFF) of the East Cantons, the Democratic Front of Francophones (FDF) and the Citizens' Movement for Change (MCC) into the Reformist Movement (MR).

== Presidents ==
=== Presidents PVV-PLP ===
- 1961 – 1968 : Omer Vanaudenhove
- 1968 – 1969 : Norbert Hougardy and Milou Jeunehomme (co-presidency)
- 1969 – 1972 : Pierre Descamps

=== Presidents PVV ===
- 1972 – 1973 : Willy De Clercq
- 1973 – 1977 : Frans Grootjans
- 1977 – 1982 : Willy De Clercq
- 1982 – 1985 : Guy Verhofstadt
- 1985 – 1989 : Annemie Neyts
- 1989 – 1992 : Guy Verhofstadt

== Notable members ==
- Lucienne Herman-Michielsens (1926–1995)
- Jean Rey (1902–1983), President of the European Commission
- Jules Audent (1834-1910)

== Electoral results ==
=== Federal Parliament ===
Chamber

Election year	# of overall votes	% of overall vote	% of language group vote	# of overall seats won	# of language group seats won	+/-	Notes
1987	709,758	11.5 (#4)		25 / 212		▲3	
1991	738,016	12.0 (#3)		26 / 212		▲1	

=== Regional parliaments ===
==== Brussels Parliament ====
Election year	# of overall votes	% of overall vote	% of language group vote	# of overall seats won	# of language group seats won	+/-	Notes
1989	12,143	2.8 (#8)		2 / 75			

=== European Parliament ===
Election year	# of overall votes	% of overall vote	% of electoral college vote	# of overall seats won	# of electoral college seats won	+/-	Notes
1979	512,363	9.4	15.3	2 / 24	2 / 13		
1984	494,277		14.2	2 / 24	2 / 13	0	
1989	625,561		17.1	2 / 24	2 / 13	0	

== See also ==
- Liberalism in Belgium
- Liberal Archive

== Sources ==
- Liberal Archive (in Dutch)
- History of liberalism in Belgium (in French)
- Th. Luykx, M. Platel, Politieke geschiedenis van België, 2 vol., Kluwer, 1985
- E. Witte, J. Craeybeckx, A. Meynen, Politieke geschiedenis van België, Standaard, 1997
