= Eurostadium =

Cancelled stadium project just north of Brussels, Belgium

- Interactive map of Eurostadium
- Full name: Eurostadium
- Location: Grimbergen, Belgium
- Capacity: 62,613

Construction
- Built: Cancelled in January 2018

Tenant
- Belgium national football team

Eurostadium was a proposed stadium in Grimbergen, Belgium, just north of Brussels. It would have had a capacity of 62,613. In June 2015, the building deadline was set for 2019. It would have hosted matches for UEFA Euro 2020, and would have become the home ground of the Belgium national football team.

The initial plans intended for it to be the home ground of RSC Anderlecht as well, but they withdrew from the project in an early stage. In contrast to the current stadium on the Heysel/Heizel Plateau, the King Baudouin Stadium, it would no longer contain an athletics track.

== History ==
In March 2015, the City of Brussels council chose the Ghelamco/BAM Consortium as best candidate to finance, build and operate the stadium. During the years that followed, however, the project was plagued by numerous political delays. Anderlecht eventually pulled out of the project in February 2017.

Because of the delays, concerns rose that the stadium would not be built in time for Euro 2020, or even at all. On 7 December 2017, the UEFA Executive Committee decided, due to these delays and the uncertainty that the stadium would be completed in time, to remove Brussels as a host city for Euro 2020. The games scheduled to be held there were instead awarded to Wembley Stadium in London, which meant that London would now host a total of seven matches (this increased to eight during the actual tournament, following the removal of Dublin as a host due to sanitary issues related to the COVID-19 pandemic).

On 30 January 2018, Flemish Minister Joke Schauvliege rejected the application from Ghelamco for an environmental permit, and as a result, the project was cancelled.

== See also ==
- List of football stadiums in Belgium
- Belgium national football team home stadium
