= Prinsenkasteel =

Castle in Grimberger, Belgium

Grimbergen Castle
- Prinsenkasteel
- Grimbergen, Flemish Brabant (formerly Duchy of Brabant) in Belgium
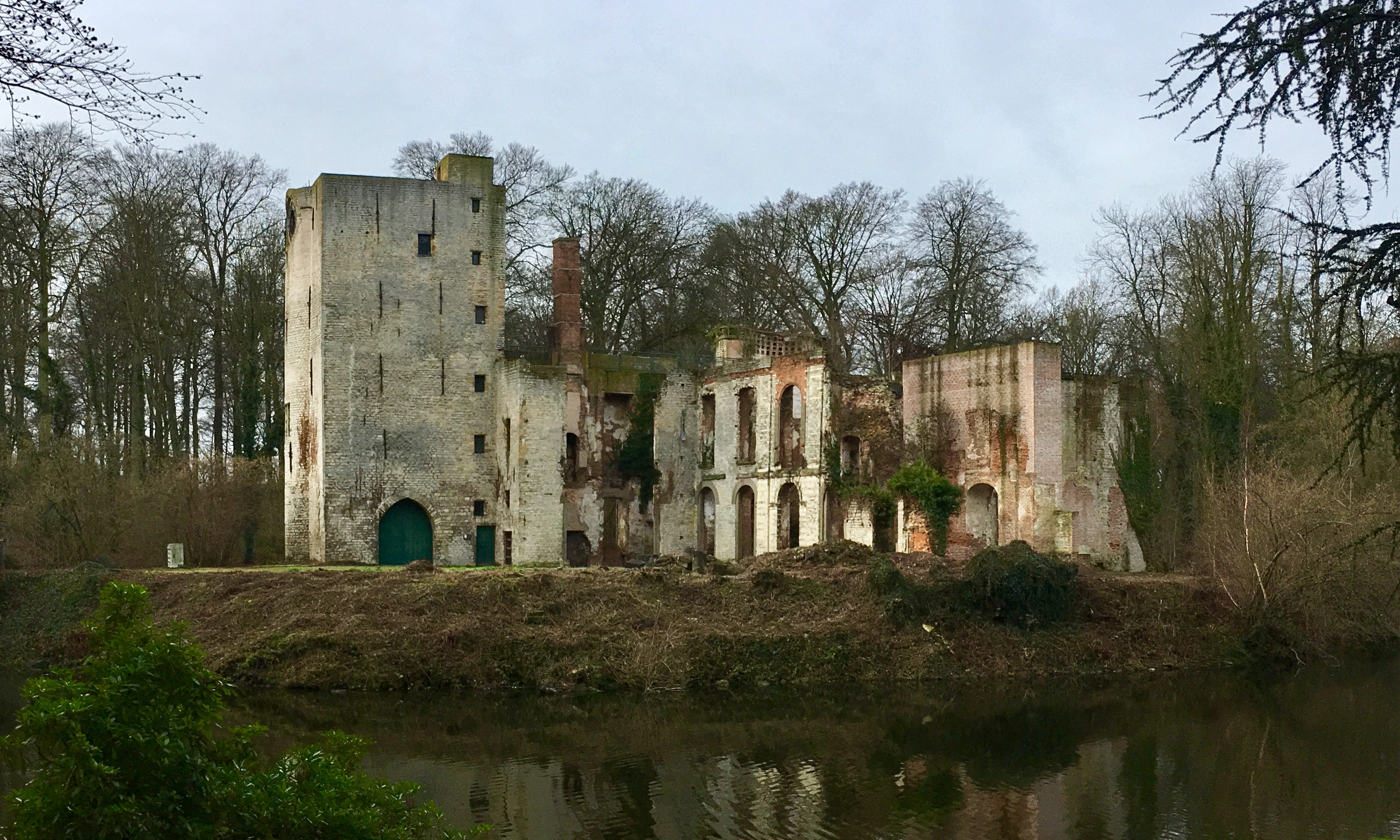

Site information
- Owner: Grimbergen municipality

Location
- Coordinates: 50°55′42″N 4°22′17″E

Site history
- Built: 14th century

Garrison information
- Occupants: Berthout Family
- Designations: listed heritage

Prinsenkasteel (literally "Princes Castle") was a castle located in Grimbergen, Belgium. It was the residence of the lords of Grimbergen from the 14th Century onwards. The castle ruins are located in Prinsenbos Park ("Princes wood").

== History ==
=== Middle Ages ===
Around the beginning of the 14th century, soon after the destruction of the Berthout family's stronghold in Borgtberg during the Grimbergen war, the lords moved their home to the current castle, then called Boksem. Their fortress was again destroyed during sieges in 1488 and 1489 respectively led by Maximilian I, then regent of the Burgundian Netherlands, and Albert III, Duke of Saxony. Only parts of the keep seem to date back to this period.

=== Early-modern times ===
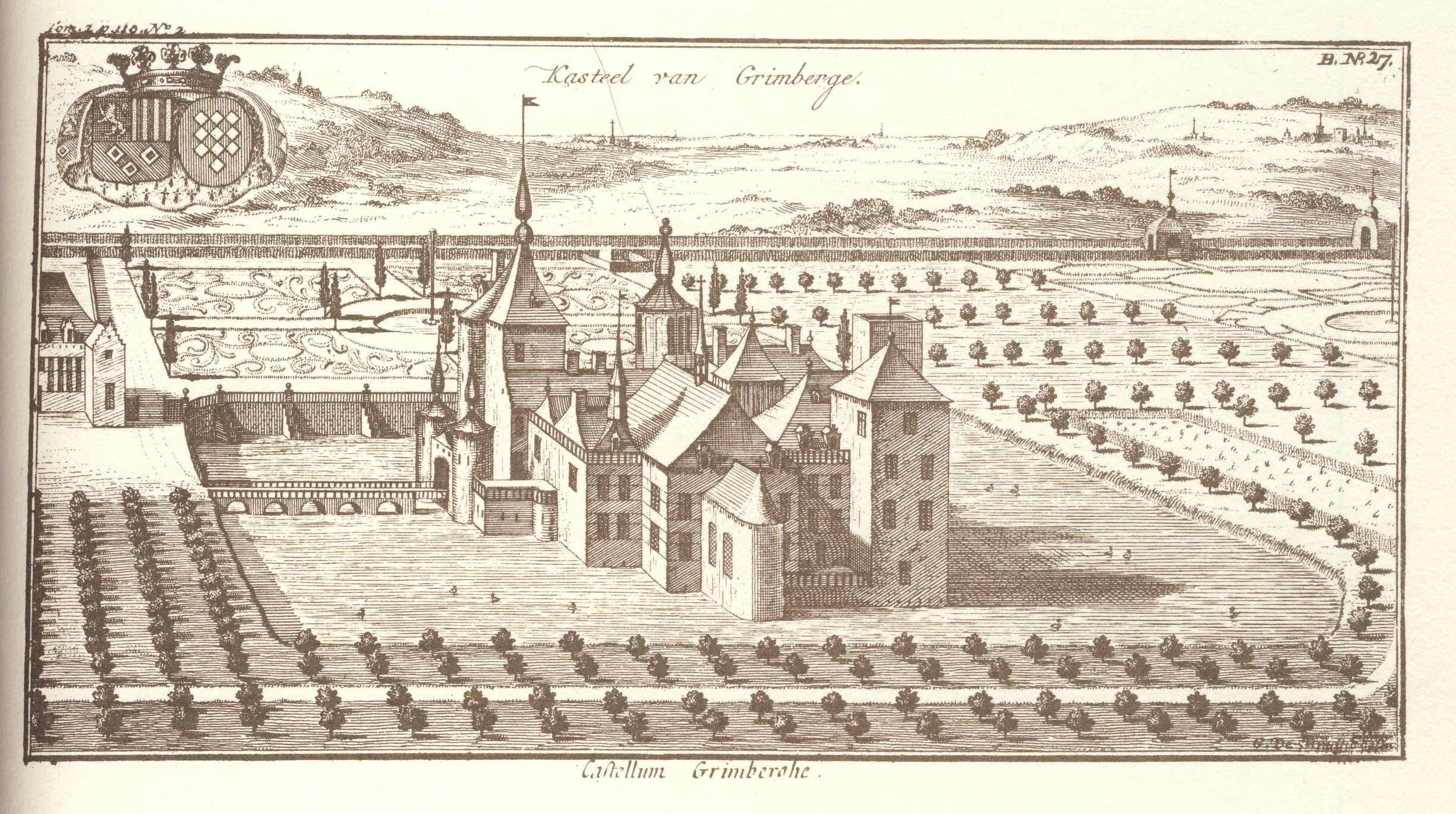
Engraving of the castle in 1770.

The present castle was built around 1500 on the foundations of the previous fortress. In 1686 the Count of Grimbergen, Philippe-François de Glymes, was given the title of Prince by Charles II of Spain. The castle then became a princely estate, hence its name. After being damaged during the War of the Austrian Succession, it was restored in 1745 and embellished in the 1770s.

The estate then passed into the hands of the House of Merode following the marriage in 1778 between the Count Charles de Mérode (1762-1830) and Marie d'Ongnies de Mastaing, Princess of Grimbergen. Their eldest son, Henri de Mérode (1782-1847), was the first member of the Mérode family to hold the title of Prince of Grimbergen.

=== Contemporary times ===
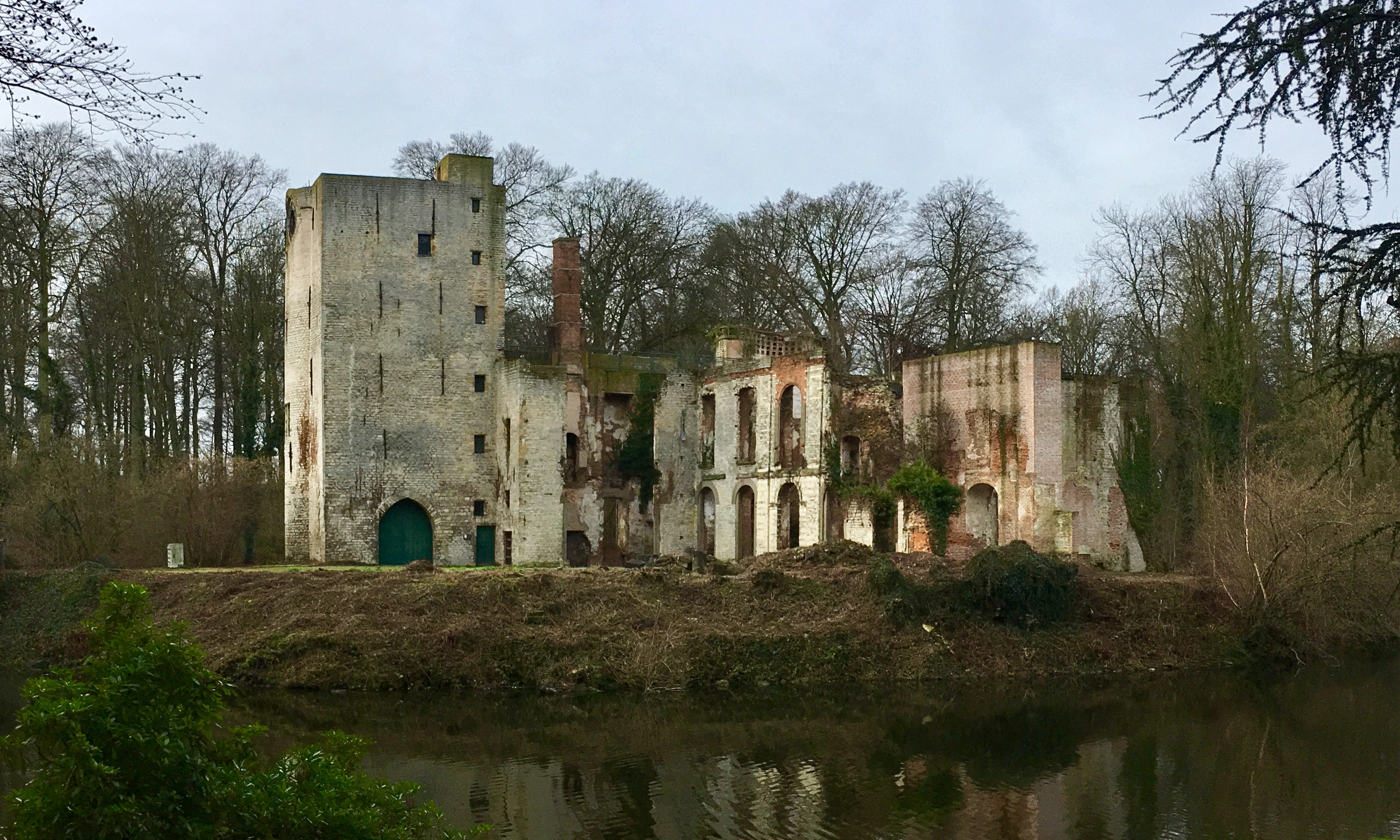
Castle ruins as they appear today in the Prinsenbos parc

From 1901 to 1933, Premonstratensians from the abbey of Sainte-Anne de Bonlieu-sur-Roubion, expelled from France following the expulsion of religious congregations, were welcomed in the castle.

During the Second World War the castle was occupied by German soldiers. They set it on fire during their retreat in 1944.

The castle ruins were bought by the municipality of Grimbergen in 1947. In 1978, the municipality also acquired the annex building, now called the Guldendal, which was formerly used as a stable, a carriage house and service building.

== Location ==
The castle ruins can still be seen in Prinsenbos Park, located in Grimbergen between the roads Prinsenstraat, Guldendal, De Merodestraat, Speelbroek, and Pastoor Woutersstraat.

The geographical coordinates of the location are 50°55′42″N 4°22′17″E.

== Legal status ==
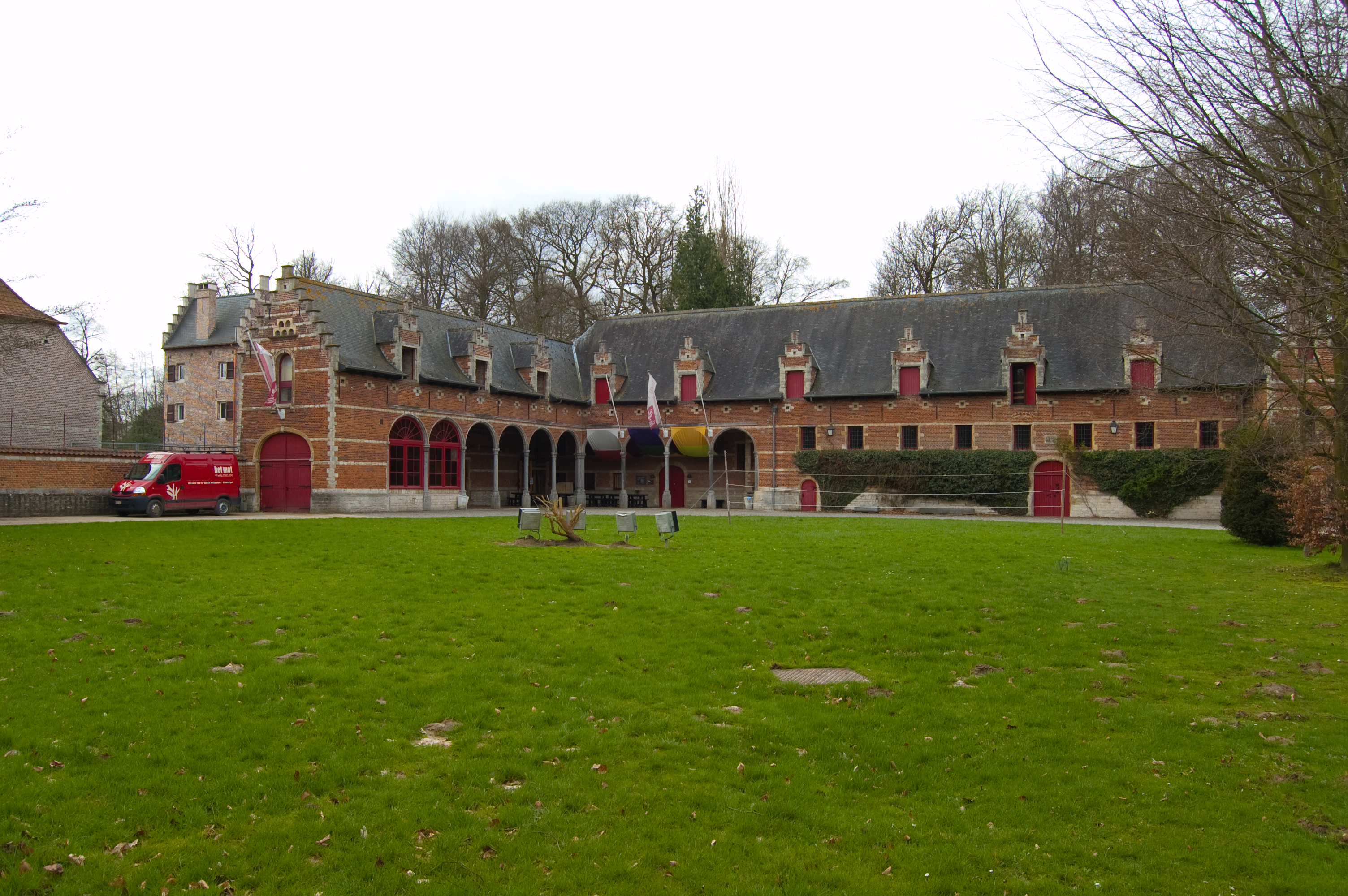
't Guldendal today

The municipality of Grimbergen owns the castle ruins, the park and the Guldendal.

The castle ruins have been listed in the heritage registers in Belgium since 1959. In 1980, the protection was extended to the entire estate as a rural site and the Guldendal also acquired the status of a historical monument.

Since 1982, the Guldendal has housed the Museum of Old Techniques (MOT).

Prinsenbos Park is open to the public. Since 2009, it has been managed by the Flemish region's Agentschap voor Natuur en Bos (Agency for Nature and Forestry). However, the castle ruins are not open to the public.
