= King Baudouin Stadium =

Stadium in Brussels, Belgium

Coordinates: 50°53′45″N 4°20′3″E

- Stade Roi Baudouin (French); Koning Boudewijnstadion (Dutch)
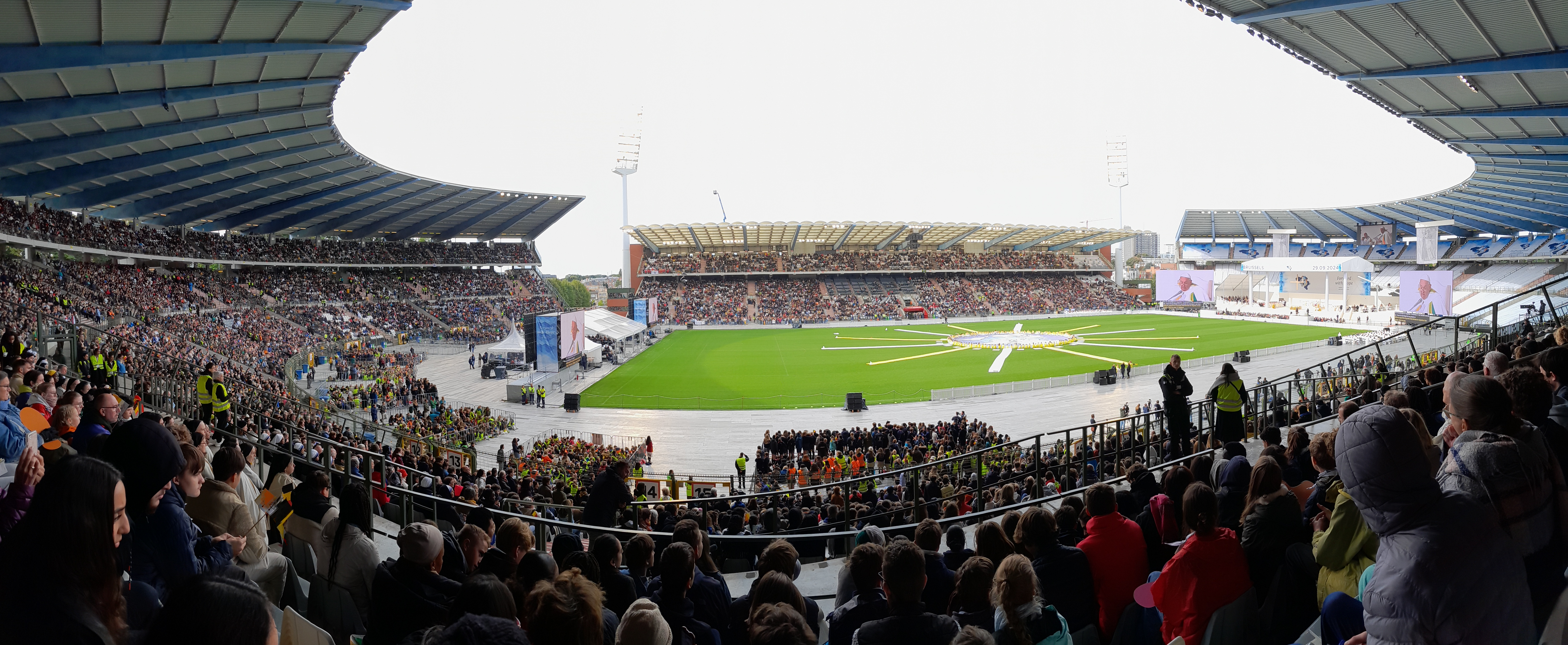
- Pope Francis leading a Holy Mass at the King Baudouin Stadium in 2024
- Interactive map of King Baudouin Stadium
- Former names: Jubilee Stadium (1930–1946); Heysel Stadium (1946–1995)
- Location: Avenue de Marathon / Marathonlaan 135/2, 1020 Laeken, City of Brussels, Brussels-Capital Region, Belgium
- Capacity: 50,093
- Surface: Grass
- Record attendance: 64,073 (Anderlecht v Dundee, 6 March 1963)
- Field size: 106 m × 66 m (348 ft × 217 ft)
- Public transit: 6 Heysel/Heizel and Roi Baudouin/Koning Boudewijn

Construction
- Opened: 23 August 1930
- Renovated: 1995 (€37 million), 2024

Tenants
- Belgium national football team (1930–1985, 1995–May 2006, November 2006–present); Union SG (2016–present; for UEFA competitions only); Belgium national rugby union team; Royal Excelsior Sports Club Brussels (athletics)

The King Baudouin Stadium (French: Stade Roi Baudouin [stad ʁwa bodwɛ̃]; Dutch: Koning Boudewijnstadion [ˌkoːnɪŋ ˈbʌudəʋɛinˌstaːdijɔn]) is a multi-use stadium in Brussels, Belgium. Located in the north-western district of the City of Brussels, it was built to embellish the Heysel/Heizel Plateau in view of the 1935 Brussels International Exposition. It was inaugurated on 23 August 1930, with Crown Prince Leopold attending the opening ceremony. The stadium hosted 70,000 at the time. Its name honours King Baudouin, Leopold's successor as King of the Belgians from 1951 to his death in 1993.

The stadium is located at 135/2, avenue de Marathon/Marathonlaan, on the border of the Bruparck entertainment park (with the Atomium, Mini-Europe miniature park and Kinepolis cinema).

== History ==
=== Early history ===
The first version of the King Baudouin Stadium was built in 1929–30 by the architect Joseph Van Neck, also chief architect of the 1935 Brussels International Exposition, in a classical modernist style. Its original name was the Jubilee Stadium (French: Stade du Centenaire, Dutch: Jubelstadion) because it was inaugurated as part of the centenary celebrations of the Belgian Revolution, with an unofficial Belgium–Netherlands football match.

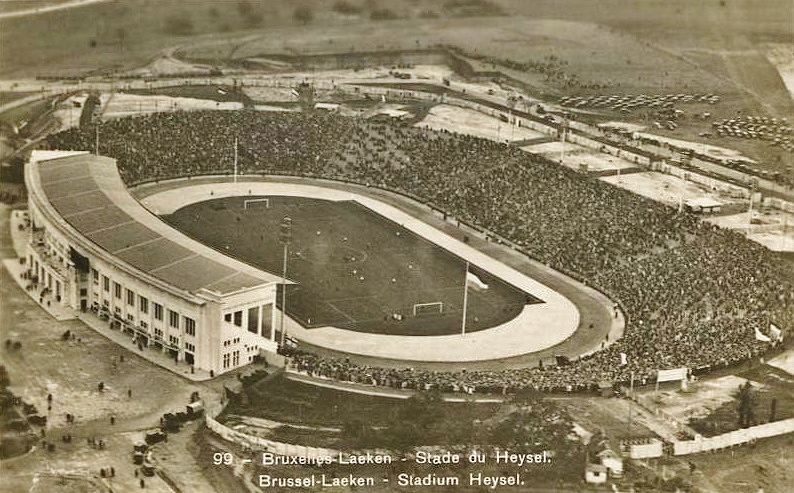
View of the Jubilee Stadium in 1935

In 1946, the stadium was stripped of the wood of its cycling track, and was renamed the Heysel Stadium (French: Stade du Heysel, Dutch: Heizelstadion), after the neighbourhood in which it is located. In 1971, a tartan track was installed allowing the organisation of athletics competitions. Three years later, in 1974, a new lighting system was installed.

The Heysel Stadium hosted European Cup finals in 1958, 1966, 1974, and 1985 and Cup Winners' Cup finals in 1964, 1976 and 1980. The highest attendance at a European game was over 69,000 in 1958.

=== May 1985 disaster ===
Despite its status as Belgium's national stadium, the Heysel Stadium was not well maintained. The stadium's poor condition manifested itself at the 1985 European Cup Final. For example, the outer wall was built of cinder block, and fans who did not have tickets were seen kicking holes in it to get in. Additionally, the only escape route led upward, and there were only three gates on each short side–nowhere near enough for the 22,000 people standing on the terraces on either side.

The stadium's inadequacies had been well known for some time. When Arsenal played there in the early 1980s, its supporters ridiculed it as a "dump." Indeed, the presidents of the two 1985 European finalists, Juventus and Liverpool, had concluded that Heysel was in no condition to host a European Final, especially one featuring two of the most popular clubs in Europe at the time. They urged UEFA to move the match to another ground, to no avail. It later emerged that UEFA had only spent half an hour inspecting the stadium.

On 29 May 1985, the Heysel Stadium disaster occurred, resulting in the deaths of 39 Juventus spectators in a crowd disorder caused by Liverpool fans before the match. Despite the disaster, the stadium continued to be used for Belgium international games from 1986 to 1990 with only minimal improvements made following the disaster. This was in part because the government had already drawn up plans to remodel the stadium into a 35,000-seat facility. Finally, in 1990, UEFA forced the issue by barring Belgium from hosting a European Final until at least 2000. It also continued to host track and field events and it still hosts the Memorial Van Damme every year.

=== Modernisations ===
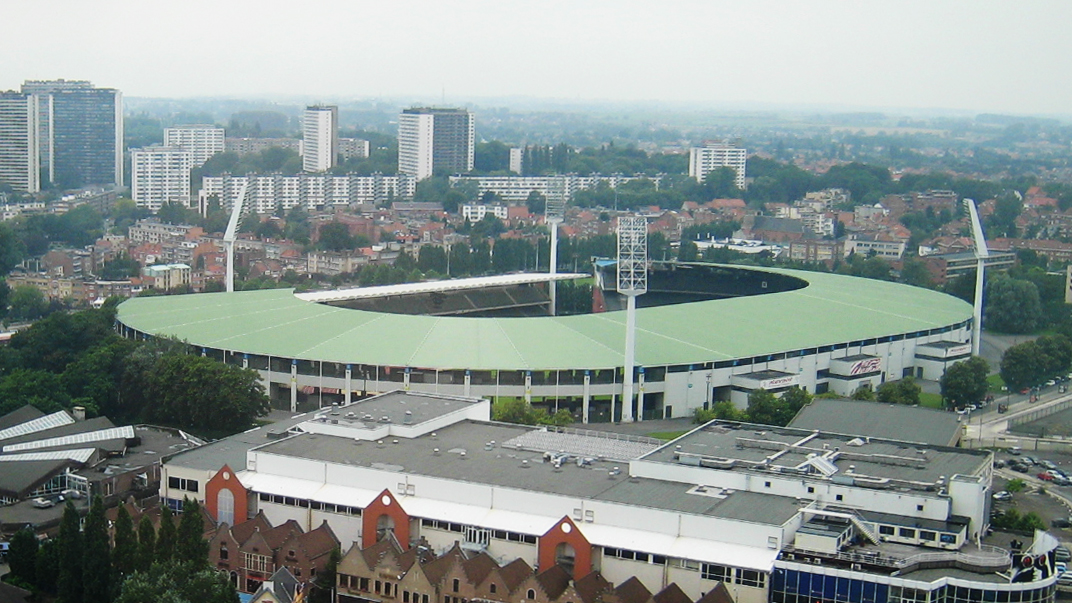
Outside view

In 1995, a decade after the disaster, the ground was rebuilt at a cost of BEF 1,500 million (around €37/$50 million in 1995), and at this time renamed the King Baudouin Stadium, after the Belgian monarch who had died two years previously. All that remains of the old stadium is a renovated gateway near the main entrance. The new structure combined the football ground with a running track and facilities for field events. It was re-opened on 23 August 1995 as the home of the Belgium national football team and is the largest stadium in Belgium; it can seat 50,093 spectators. The remodelled stadium hosted the 1996 European Cup Winners Cup final, as well as the opening game for Euro 2000.

On 26 May 2006, the Belgian Football Association decided not to use the King Baudouin Stadium anymore for the national team home matches and for the Cup final, because the gates of stand one were too narrow and the stadium was deemed unsafe. The next match of the national team was thus held at the Constant Vanden Stock Stadium. The City of Brussels complained that contrary to these claims the stadium was safe, and this complaint was upheld in court. On 6 October 2006, the Belgian Football Association met with representatives of the City of Brussels and they agreed to renew the contract and extend it to 30 June 2008.

In March 2019, the Belgian Football Association announced plans for a new redevelopment of the King Baudouin Stadium. The stadium would be rebuilt to a reduced capacity of 40,000 spectators and renamed to the Golden Generation Arena with a prospective completion date of 2022. That idea was quietly discarded. An architectural firm has never been appointed, an environmental study ordered or a client sought. From the politicians, who were said to be positive about the idea across party lines in the beginning, hardly anything is moving.

== Sporting events ==
=== Association football ===
Major international football matches have taken place in the King Baudouin Stadium: the finals of the European Champion Clubs' Cup in 1958, 1966, 1974 and 1985, those of the Cup of Cups in 1964, 1976, 1980 and 1996, as well as that of the European Championships in 1972 between West Germany and the USSR (3–0).

The stadium hosted five matches of the UEFA Euro 2000, organised by Belgium and the Netherlands, including the inaugural match between Belgium and Sweden (2–1) on 10 June, and the semi-final between Portugal and France (1–2) on 28 June.

UEFA Euro 2000 matches:

Date	Team 1	Result	Team 2	Round
10 June 2000	Belgium	2–1	Sweden	Group B
14 June 2000	Italy	2–0	Belgium	Group B
19 June 2000	Turkey	2–0	Belgium	Group B
24 June 2000	Italy	2–0	Romania	Quarter-finals
28 June 2000	France	2–1 (asdet)	Portugal	Semi-finals

On 18 February 2021, the Belgian women's team played its first official match there. This was a friendly match against the Netherlands (1–6) played as part of the promotion of the triple bid to host the Women's Football World Cup, the third country being Germany. This choice was explained by the work carried out at the Eneco Stadium (where the Red Flames usually play) during this period.

=== Cycling ===
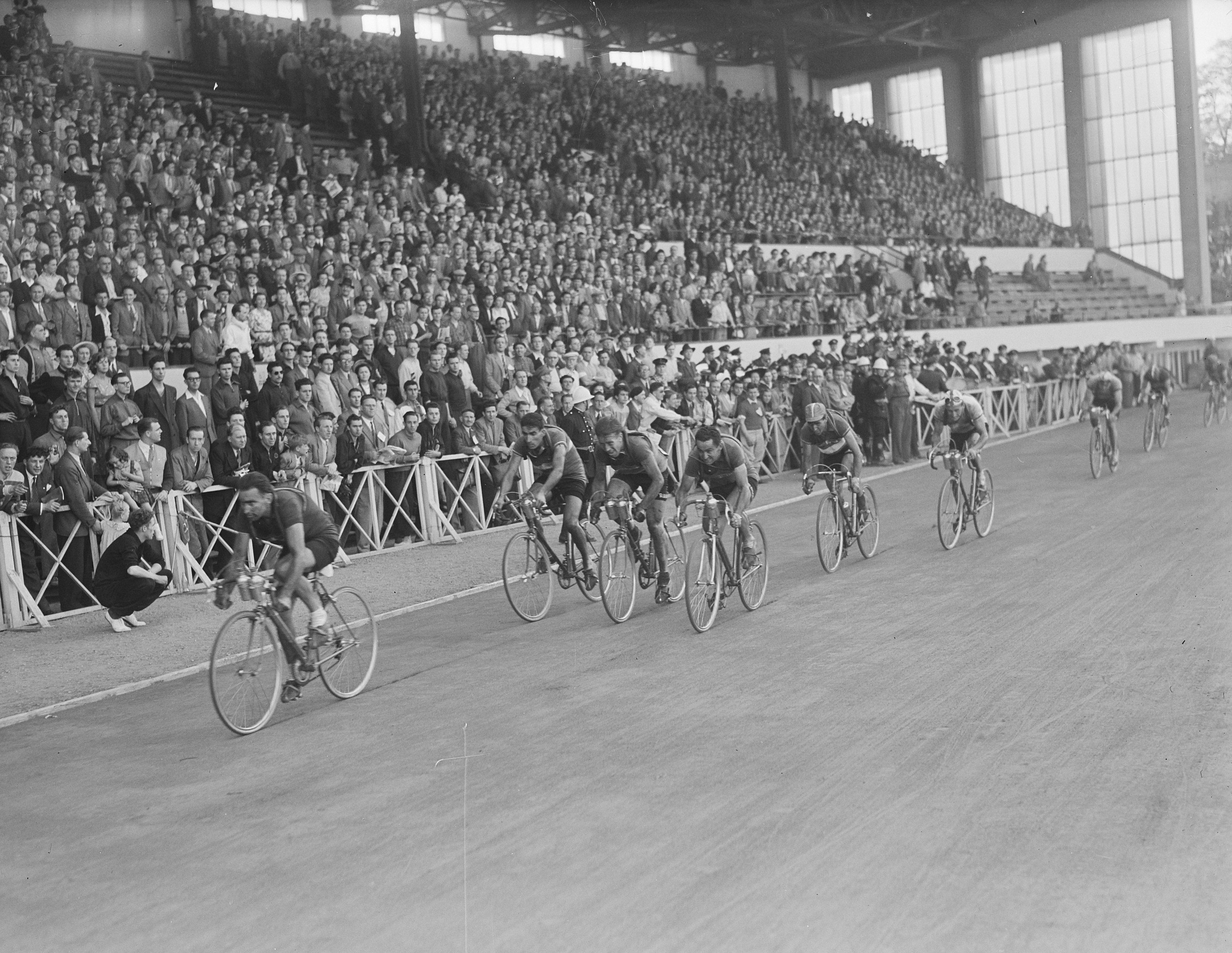
Peloton sprint finish during the 1949 Tour de France

The UCI Track Cycling World Championships were organised in the Heysel stadium in 1930 and 1935.

The stadium has also been used for road cycling. For instance, stage 2 of both the 1949 and the 1960 Tour de France finished in the Heysel stadion.

=== Rugby union ===
On 25 August 2007, Belgium played Argentina in rugby union as part of Argentina's 2007 Rugby World Cup preparations. Argentina defeated Belgium 36–8.

The stadium was scheduled to witness a rugby union milestone on 19 December 2009, when the Parisian club Stade Français planned to take their Heineken Cup home match against Irish club Ulster to the stadium in a match that had sold more than 30,000 tickets. However, heavy snowfall in Brussels on the intended matchday forced the cancellation of what would have been the first Heineken Cup match held in Belgium; the fixture was instead played the following day in Paris.

The stadium had another shot at hosting a Heineken Cup match in 2012. On 20 October 2012, English club Saracens took their Heineken Cup pool match against Racing Métro to Brussels.

=== Tennis ===
On 8 July 2010, the stadium played host to the Best of Belgium gala which featured a tennis match originally scheduled to be between Justine Henin and Kim Clijsters. Henin had to pull out and Serena Williams replaced her as the match was played in front of the largest crowd ever for a single match, beating the attendance set at the Battle of the Sexes.

== Concerts ==
Every year, the stadium hosts major sporting events such as the national football team's matches, the Belgian Football Cup final, the Memorial Van Damme, and more. It has also showcased concerts by some of the world's greatest artists, including the Rolling Stones, U2, Madonna, Beyoncé, Céline Dion, Johnny Hallyday, Robbie Williams, Genesis, Bruce Springsteen, Ed Sheeran, Coldplay, Rammstein, and many more.

Concerts at the King Baudouin Stadium
Date	Artist	Event	Attendance	Ref(s)
20 June 1997	Céline Dion	Falling into You: Around the World	—	
16 June 1999	Céline Dion	Let's Talk About Love World Tour	59,876 / 59,876	
8 July 2000	Johnny Hallyday	—	—	
12 May 2003	Bruce Springsteen	The Rising Tour	—	
13 June 2003	Johnny Hallyday	—	—	
10 June 2005	U2	Vertigo Tour	60,499 / 60,499	
24 June 2007	Genesis	Turn It On Again Tour	30,736 / 45,000	
14 June 2008	Bon Jovi	Lost Highway Tour	31,041 / 31,041	
13 September 2008	André Rieu	—	—	
22 September 2010	U2	U2 360° Tour	144,338 / 144,338	
23 September 2010	U2	U2 360° Tour	144,338 / 144,338	
12 July 2012	Madonna	The MDNA Tour	36,778 / 36,778	
3 August 2013	Robbie Williams	Take the Crown Stadium Tour	—	
13 June 2015	One Direction	On the Road Again Tour	56,110 / 56,110	
31 July 2016	Beyoncé	The Formation World Tour	48,955 / 48,955	
21 June 2017	Coldplay	A Head Full of Dreams Tour	100,489 / 100,489	
22 June 2017	Coldplay	A Head Full of Dreams Tour	100,489 / 100,489	
1 August 2017	U2	The Joshua Tree Tours	—	
1 September 2017	Coely	Memorial Van Damme 2017	—	
16 June 2019	Metallica	WorldWired Tour	49,039 / 49,039	
11 July 2022	The Rolling Stones	Sixty	—	
22 July 2022	Ed Sheeran	The Mathematics Tour	104,473 / 127,999	
23 July 2022	Ed Sheeran	The Mathematics Tour	104,473 / 127,999	
5 August 2022	Coldplay	Music of the Spheres World Tour	224,719 / 224,719	
6 August 2022	Coldplay	Music of the Spheres World Tour	224,719 / 224,719	
8 August 2022	Coldplay	Music of the Spheres World Tour	224,719 / 224,719	
9 August 2022	Coldplay	Music of the Spheres World Tour	224,719 / 224,719	
14 May 2023	Beyoncé	Renaissance World Tour	53,062 / 53,062	
11 July 2023	The Weeknd	After Hours til Dawn Tour	103,297 / 103,297	
12 July 2023	The Weeknd	After Hours til Dawn Tour	103,297 / 103,297	
3 August 2023	Rammstein	Rammstein Stadium Tour	150,000 / 150,000	
4 August 2023	Rammstein	Rammstein Stadium Tour	150,000 / 150,000	
5 August 2023	Rammstein	Rammstein Stadium Tour	150,000 / 150,000	
14 July 2024	P!nk	Summer Carnival 2024	—	
1 July 2026	BTS	Arirang World Tour	126,194 / 126,194	
2 July 2026	BTS	Arirang World Tour	126,194 / 126,194	
22 July 2026	Bad Bunny	Debí Tirar Más Fotos World Tour	—	

== Heysel Stadium Silver Coin ==
To celebrate the 75th anniversary of the stadium, the Belgian state released a commemorative coin: the €10 75 years of Heysel Stadium commemorative coin. The obverse depicts an image of a footballer with the stadium in the background. The flags of Belgium and the Netherlands can be seen on top of the stadium as well as the year that the stadium was built.

== See also ==
- Heysel Stadium disaster
- Belgium national football team home stadium
- List of association football stadiums by capacity
- List of tennis stadiums by capacity

Events and tenants
Preceded by Estadio Santiago Bernabéu; Madrid	European Cup; Final venue 1958	Succeeded by Neckarstadion; Stuttgart
Preceded by De Kuip; Rotterdam	European Cup Winners' Cup; Final venue 1964	Succeeded by Wembley Stadium; London
Preceded by San Siro; Milan	European Cup; Final venue 1966	Succeeded by Estádio Nacional; Lisbon (Oeiras)
Preceded by Stadio Olimpico; Rome	UEFA European Championship; Final venue 1972	Succeeded by Stadion Crvena Zvezda; Belgrade
Preceded by Stadion Crvena Zvezda; Belgrade	European Cup; Final venue 1974	Succeeded by Parc des Princes; Paris
Preceded by St. Jakob Stadium; Basel	European Cup Winners' Cup; Final venue 1976	Succeeded by Olympisch Stadion; Amsterdam
Preceded by St. Jakob Stadium; Basel	European Cup Winners' Cup; Final venue 1980	Succeeded by Rheinstadion; Düsseldorf
Preceded by Stadio Olimpico; Rome	European Cup; Final venue 1985	Succeeded by Estadio Ramón Sánchez Pizjuán; Seville
Preceded by Parc des Princes; Paris	UEFA Cup Winners' Cup; Final venue 1996	Succeeded by De Kuip; Rotterdam
