= Norbert Hougardy =

Belgian politician

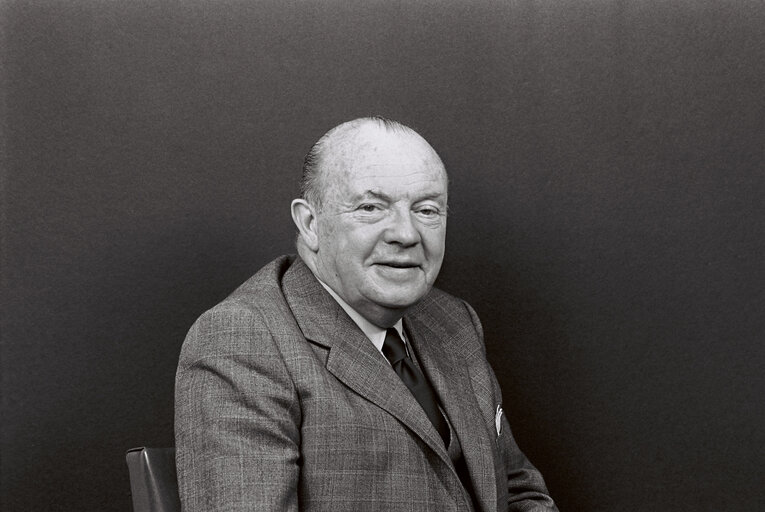
- Occupation: politician

Norbert Isidore Joseph Hougardy was a Belgian liberal politician. Hougardy was a commercial director and municipality Council member in Sint-Genesius-Rode. He became senator (1956 –) for the PVV and also a member of the European Parliament. Together with Milou Jeunehomme he was President of the PVV-PLP in 1968–1969.

== Sources ==
- Presidents of the Belgian liberal party
