= Jacques Van Offelen =

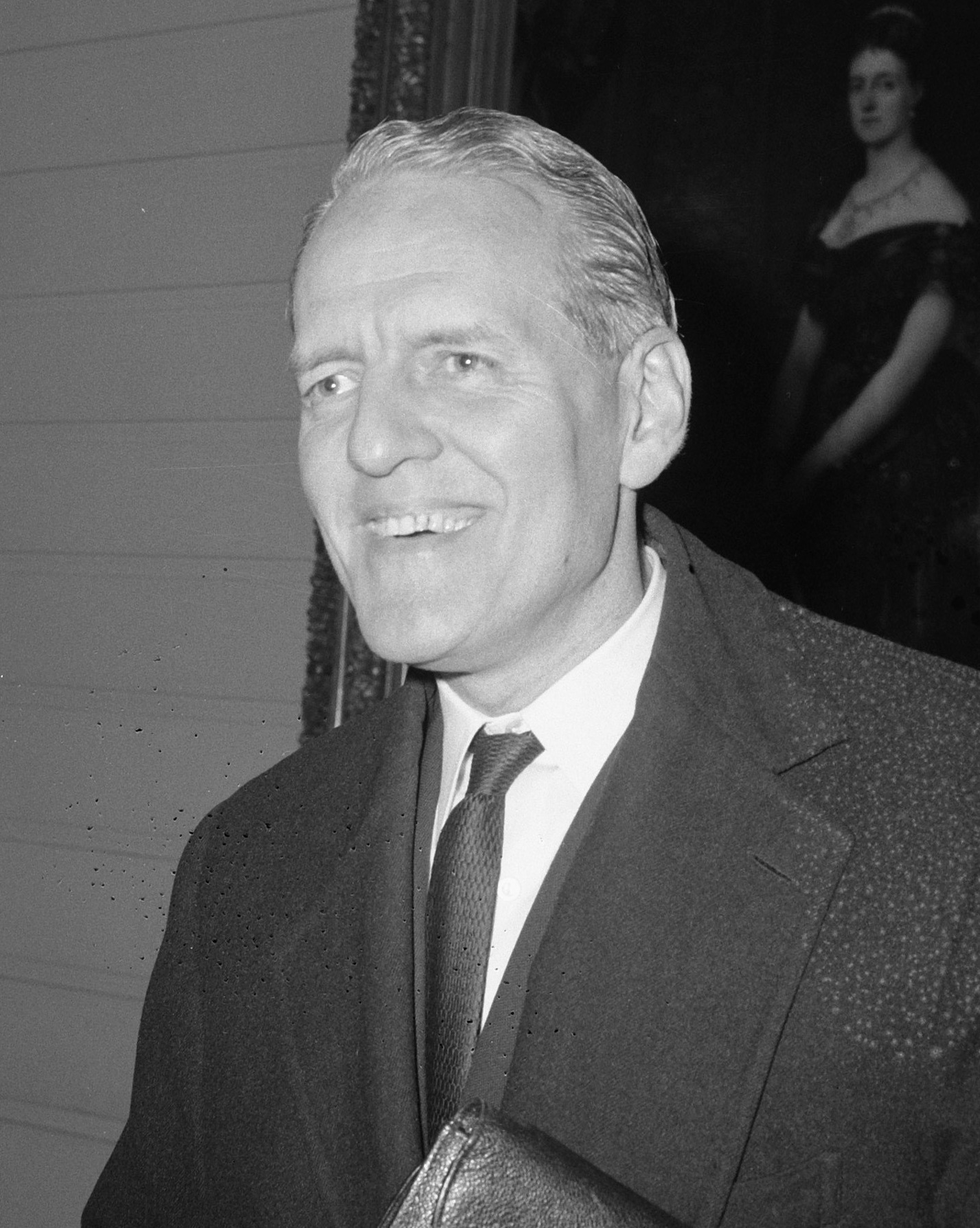
Jacques Van Offelen in 1966

Jacques Louis Gustave Van Offelen (Isleworth, 18 October 1916 – Uccle, 22 February 2006) was a Belgian liberal politician, burgomaster and minister for the PVV. He graduated from the Institut Supérieur de Commerce de l'Etat (1938) in Antwerp, and in 1939 became a licentiate in economy at the Universite Libre de Bruxelles. He obtained a PhD from the University of Liège in 1943 and became a civil servant and docent.

He was burgomaster of Uccle (1964–), a member of parliament (1958–1977) and senator (1977–1978) for the PVV in the district Brussels. Van Offelen was Minister of Foreign Trade (1958–1961) and Minister for Economic Affairs (1966–1968) in the Belgian government.

== Sources ==
- Jacques Van Offelen (liberal archive) (PDF, Dutch)
- Jacques Van Offelen (MR, French)
