= August De Winter =

Belgian politician (1925–2005)

- Born: August Maria Christiaan De Winter; 12 May 1925; Grimbergen
- Died: 30 July 2005 (aged 80); Belgium
- Occupation: politician

August Maria Christiaan De Winter (12 May 1925 – 30 July 2005) was a liberal Belgian politician of the PVV. Between 1965 and 1971, he was burgomaster of Grimbergen. He was State Secretary of the regional economy of Brussels in the government Tindemans-De Clercq (25 April 1974 – 3 June 1977) and State Secretary of the district of Brussels in the government Martens-III (18 May 1980 – 22 October 1980). De Winter ended his political career as a member of the European Parliament.
