= Jules Audent =

Belgian politician

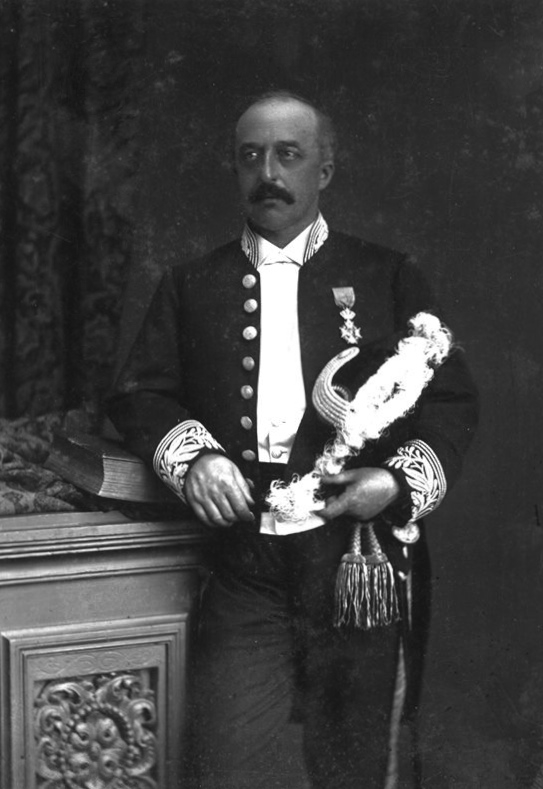
- Jules Audent in full mayoral regalia.
- Born: Jules André Albert Audent; 6 June 1834; Charleroi
- Died: 6 October 1910 (aged 76); Charleroi
- Resting place: Charleroi Nord cemetery University of Liège
- Education: Athénée royal de Bruxelles
- Occupations: politician, lawyer, and board member
- Political party: Party for Freedom and Progress

Jules Audent was a Belgian politician, lawyer, and board member, part of the Party for Freedom and Progress, born on June 6, 1834, in Charleroi, and died in that city on October 6, 1910.

As a lawyer, he left a mark on the judicial life of his time in Charleroi with his strong personality. As Alderman of Public Instruction, he established schools for boys and girls. As mayor, he had to show diplomacy during the "separation of the Faubourg" issue and confront workers who threatened to loot the city during the strikes of March 1886.

He is mainly known for the major works carried out under his impetus, earning him the nickname "Haussmann of Charleroi". These urbanization works replaced the fortifications surrounding the city with boulevards, parks, housing, and public buildings.

== Biography ==
Jules-André-Albert Audent is the son of lawyer Albert Audent and Léocadie Masquelier. He studied secondary education at the communal college of Charleroi initially, and then at the Royal Athenaeum of Brussels. He obtained a law degree from the University of Liège in 1857.

On August 17, 1869, he married Aline François, daughter of the industrialist Alexandre François. She died on March 29, 1871, at the age of 29, a few days after the birth of their daughter, Élise.

=== Professional Life ===
==== Lawyer ====
Upon graduation, he became a lawyer at the Charleroi Tribunal of first instance, where his skills were recognized, particularly in civil cases. He was an authority as a legal consultant and trained many interns who later became prominent magistrates and lawyers. Eight times Bar President between 1871 and 1908, Jules Audent left his mark on the judicial life of Charleroi with his strong personality.

==== Company Administrator ====
As a business lawyer, Jules Audent sat on the board of directors of numerous companies, including the General Savings and Pension Fund, the Iron Works and Forges de la Providence in Marchienne-au-Pont, the Ormont Coal Mines in Châtelet, and the Petit-Try in Lambusart. Towards the end of his life, he was a director of the Banque de Bruxelles.

Additionally, Jules Audent was among the 154 liberals who, in 1878, founded the La Nouvelle Gazette.

=== Politician ===
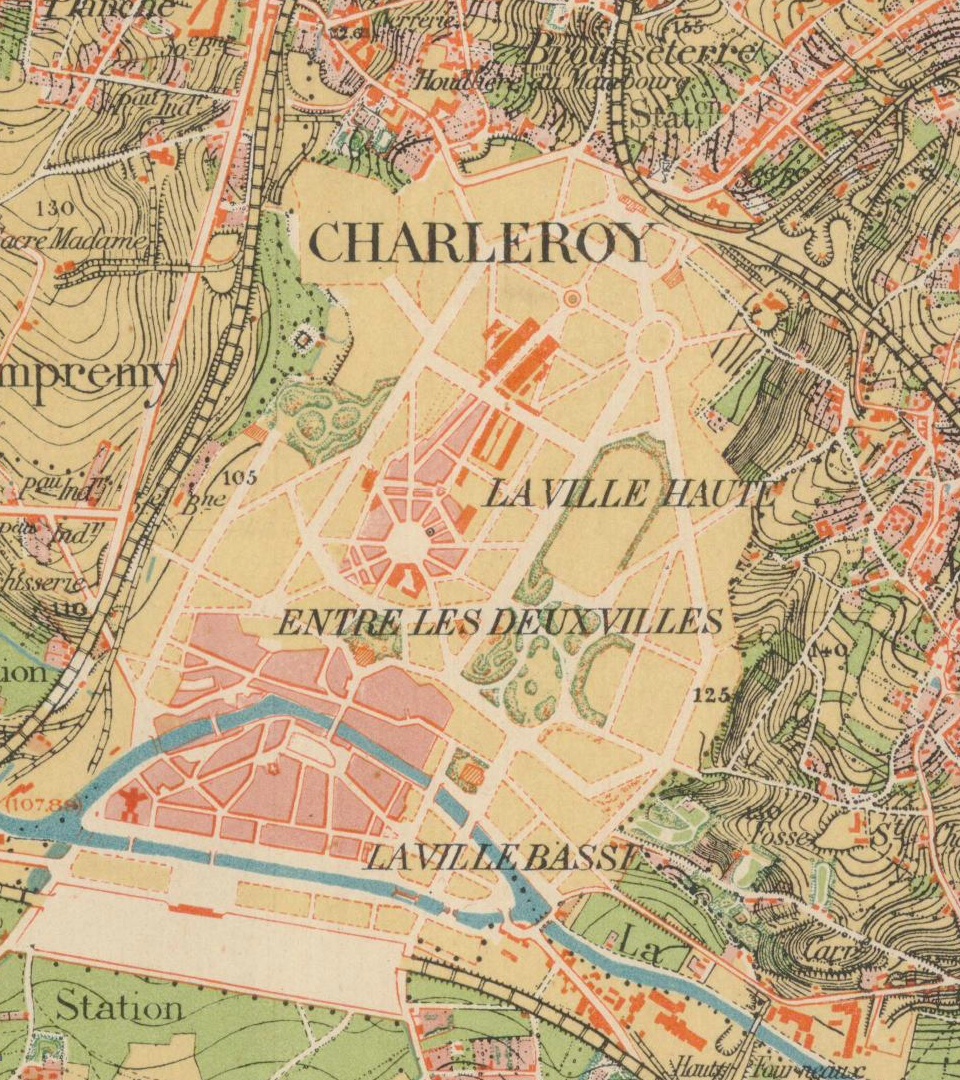
Topographic map published in 1873 depicting the award-winning project from 1867. The 1867 project will undergo significant modifications with a new development plan in 1880.

Jules Audent was elected municipal councilor on October 27, 1863. At that time, the city was surrounded by walls preventing its expansion, and the municipal authorities wanted their dismantling. From 1865, Jules Audent requested a competition for the development of a plan for the military lands. He served as rapporteur of the jury tasked with examining the selected projects. He also handled negotiations between the State and the municipality regarding their respective rights and obligations in the appropriation of military lands. He ensured the best defense of the city's interests. Demolition works began in 1868 and were completed in 1871.

In 1871, the municipal administration borrowed money to allow significant spending for education. Audent became Alderman of Public Instruction of Charleroi in 1873. Assisted by teacher Eugène Cobaux, he established schools for boys and girls in different neighborhoods of the city. He also organized official kindergarten education.

On March 9, 1879, Jules Audent was appointed mayor. With the help of Alfred-Hyppolite Defontaine, who became Alderman of Instruction, he continued the educational policy. The city organized technical and vocational education, and the former school for overseers and foremen became a renowned industrial school. The former communal college became a Royal Athenaeum in 1881. During the "separation of the Faubourg" issue, where the majority-working-class inhabitants wanted to establish it as an autonomous municipality, Audent had to show diplomacy and energy to maintain the territorial integrity of Charleroi.

During the strikes of March 1886, where social unrest took on the dimensions of general insurrection, and following the events in Liège, Jules Audent requested Joseph d'Ursel, governor of the province of Hainaut, to send a squadron of lancers from Tournai to protect Gilly. He posted a text strongly urging citizens to stay home, "thus avoiding being victims of reckless curiosity". General Alfred van der Smissen refused any military assistance to Charleroi, considering the Civic Guard sufficient to defend the city. He urged Alderman Defontaine to open fire, without legal warnings, by this same Civic Guard if it were in danger. Alderman Defontaine refused and denounced the illegal and unconstitutional nature of the general's orders. The workers who threatened to loot the city were repelled by the police and the Civic Guard alone without any fatalities.

On December 21, 1891, following the death of Émile Balisaux, Audent became a senator. He was regularly re-elected until 1908, when he did not run again. In the Senate, he was not very talkative and was among the doctrinaires. He mainly intervened on justice issues. He also called for the establishment of personal and compulsory military service. Not very open to social problems, he preferred an electoral system based on capacitism over general voting rights.

Following the municipal elections of November 17, 1895, the first socialist elected officials, led by Édouard Falony, entered the municipal council, and the debates became more engaged and violent than before. This sometimes made Mayor Audent uncomfortable, as he did not appreciate excessive political quarrels in council meetings.

On December 26, 1903, Jules Audent, affectionately called the "old mayor," considering himself too old to fulfill his mayoral duties with the zeal he had shown before, resigned from his post and bid farewell to the municipal council.

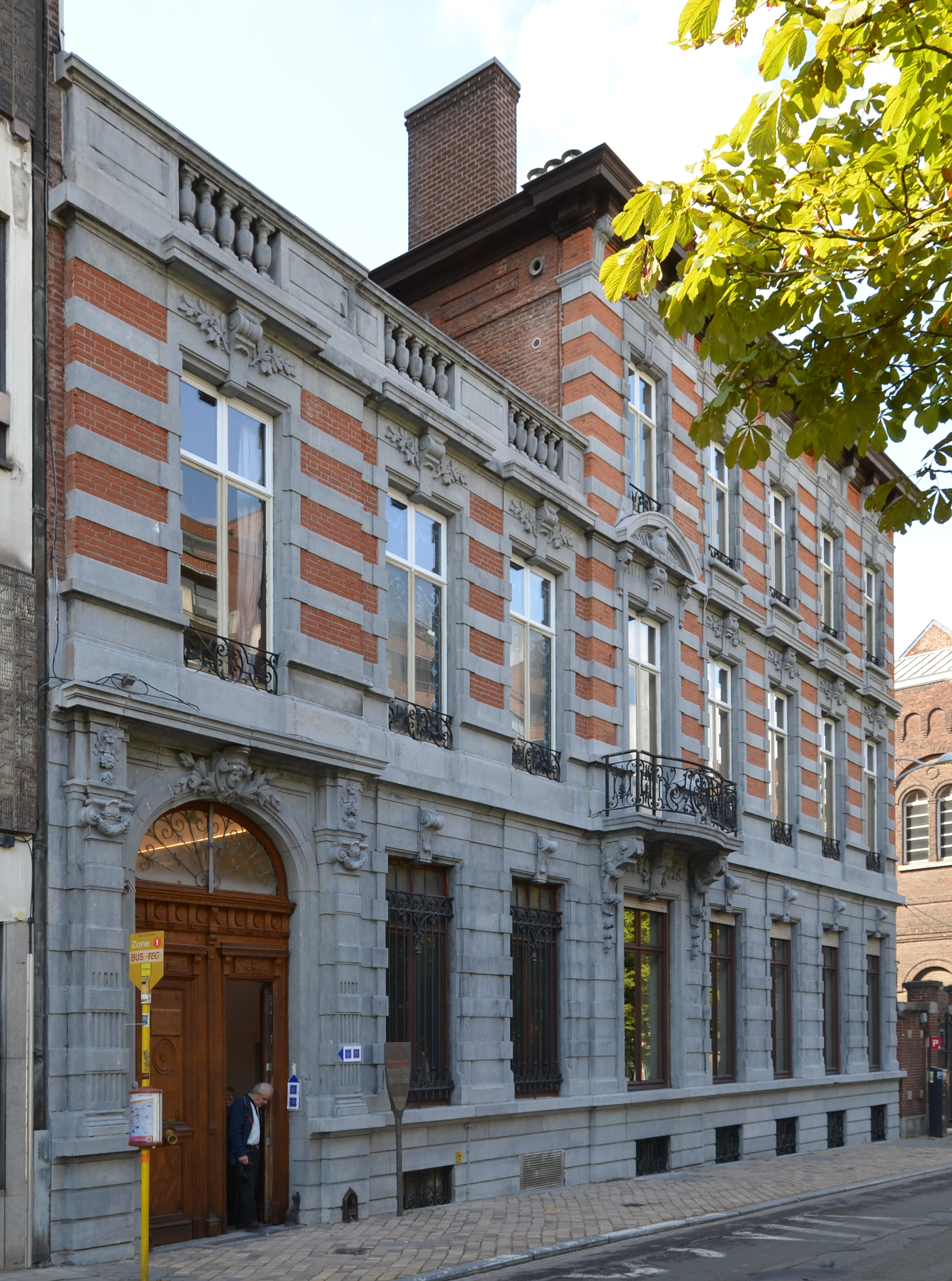
The house of Jules Audent, built in 1877 on Central Boulevard, later renamed Boulevard Audent in 1889.

== Distinctions ==
- Commander of the Order of Leopold;
- Officer of the Legion of Honour;
- First Class Civic Cross;
- Commemorative Medal of the Reign of Leopold II;
- Special First Class Medal of Mutual Aid.

== Legacy ==
The era of Jules Audent was a period of major works for Charleroi. From several comprehensive plans, public parks, streets, and boulevards equipped with a water and sewage distribution network and lined with elegant houses were developed. In addition to schools, other important buildings were built or completed: construction of a slaughterhouse, a large communal warehouse, a new courthouse in 1880, and a stock exchange in 1893. From 1879 to 1910, the city's population almost doubled, increasing by more than 15,000 people, and about 2,000 houses were built.

Audent is sometimes nicknamed the "Haussmann of Charleroi".

A boulevard in Charleroi, initially called the Central Boulevard, was named after him on May 31, 1889.

== Bibliography ==
- Delaet, Jean-Louis (1996). "Ginette Kurgan-van Hentenrijk". Dictionnaire des patrons en Belgique : Les hommes, les entreprises, les réseaux (in French). De Boeck & Larcier. ISBN 2-8041-1581-X.
- De Paepe, Jean-Luc; Raindorf-Gérard, Christiane (1996). "Jules Audent". Le Parlement Belge 1831-1894 : Données Biographiques (in French). Académie Royale de Belgique. ISBN 978-2-8031-0140-5.
- Everard, Jean (1959). Monographie des rues de Charleroi (in French). Collins.
- Hendrickx, Jean-Pierre (1976). "Audent (Jules-André-Albert)". Biographie nationale (PDF) (in French). Académie Royale de Belgique.
- Houdez, Gustave (1911). Quatre-vingt-six : Les troubles de Charleroi (in French). Dufrane-Friart.
- Schaeffer, Pierre-Jean (1995). Charleroi 1830-1994 : Histoire d'une Métropole (in French). Quorum. ISBN 2-930014-42-3.
- van Kalken, Frans (1936). Commotions populaires en Belgique (1834-1902) (in French). Office de publicité.
