= Jacky Buchmann =

Belgian politician (1932–2018)

Jacques Jean Henri Buchmann (5 March 1932 – 24 May 2018) was a Belgian politician.

A member of the Party for Freedom and Progress, he was first elected to the Chamber of Representatives in 1974. Buchmann lost reelection in 1977, but regained his seat in the snap elections of 1978. He sat on the Flemish Parliament between 1980 and 1985. Buchmann retained his position as a federal representative until 1985, when he won election to the Senate, from which he stepped down in 1995. Between 1982 and 2001, Buchmann was mayor of Kapellen. In 1987 there came a law which forbade people to be in both the parlement as a mayor. So he stepped down as mayor, in which his party member Jan Kerremans took his place. Until 1988 when Jacky became mayor again after stepping down in the parlement.

He died on 24 May 2018, aged 86.
