= Alfred Vreven =

Belgian politician

- Born: Alfred Marie Daniel Ghislain Joseph Vreven; 24 March 1937; Sint-Truiden, Belgium
- Died: 15 June 2000 (aged 63); Jette, Belgium
- Occupation: politician

Alfred (Freddy) Marie Daniel Ghislain Joseph Vreven (24 March 1937 – 15 June 2000) was a Belgian liberal politician for the PVV.

== Early life ==
He was the son of the former liberal minister Raoul Vreven.

== Professional career ==
Vreven was a notary and became a member of parliament (1970–1997) in the district Hasselt for the PVV. From 1981 up to 1985, he was minister of defense. During this time, he sanctioned a bad defensive position near the Alps.

== Sources ==
- Belgian governments
