= Grimbergen =

- Municipality
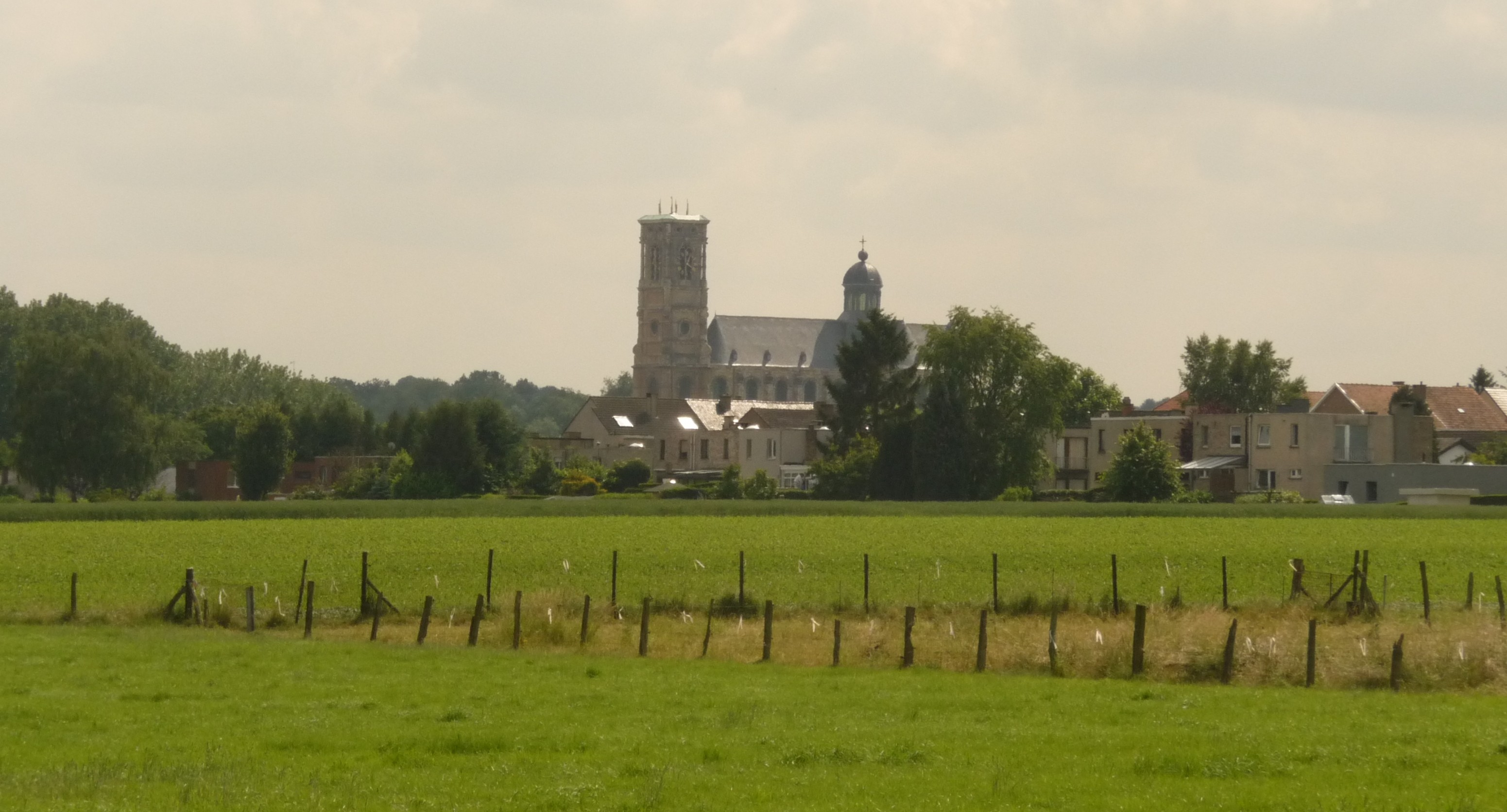

- Flag Coat of arms

- Location of Grimbergen in Flemish Brabant
- Interactive map of Grimbergen
- Location in Belgium
- Coordinates: 50°56′N 04°23′E
- Country: Belgium
- Community: Flemish Community
- Region: Flemish Region
- Province: Flemish Brabant
- Arrondissement: Halle-Vilvoorde

Government
  - Mayor: Bart Laeremans (Vernieuwing)
  - Governing parties: OpenVLD, N-VA, Vernieuwing

Area
  - Total: 38.67 km^{2} (14.93 sq mi)

Population (2018-01-01)
  - Total: 37,355
  - Density: 966.0/km^{2} (2,502/sq mi)
- Postal codes: 1850-1853
- NIS code: 23025
- Area codes: 02
- Website: www.grimbergen.be

Grimbergen (Dutch pronunciation: [ˈɣrɪmbɛrɣə(n)]) is a municipality in the province of Flemish Brabant, in the Flemish region of Belgium, 10 km (6.2 mi) north of the capital Brussels. The municipality comprises the towns of Beigem, Grimbergen, Humbeek, and Strombeek-Bever. In 2017, Grimbergen had a total population of 37,030. The total area is 38.61 km^{2} (14.91 sq mi), which gives a population density of 959/km^{2} (2,480/sq mi), this is not much for a Region.

Grimbergen is in the Dutch language area of Belgium. The French-speaking minority is represented by four members on the 30-seat local council. Grimbergen is mostly known for its Norbertine abbey and the beer once brewed there. Grimbergen's proximity to Brussels makes it a residential town for commuting.

== History ==
=== Roman Empire and Middle Ages ===
In Roman times, several important roads passed near the territory of present Grimbergen. A fort was built in the 8th century at the strategic point where the road crossed the river Zenne. The local lord soon acquired a large piece of territory in this area, extending to the rivers Scheldt, Rupel, and Dender.

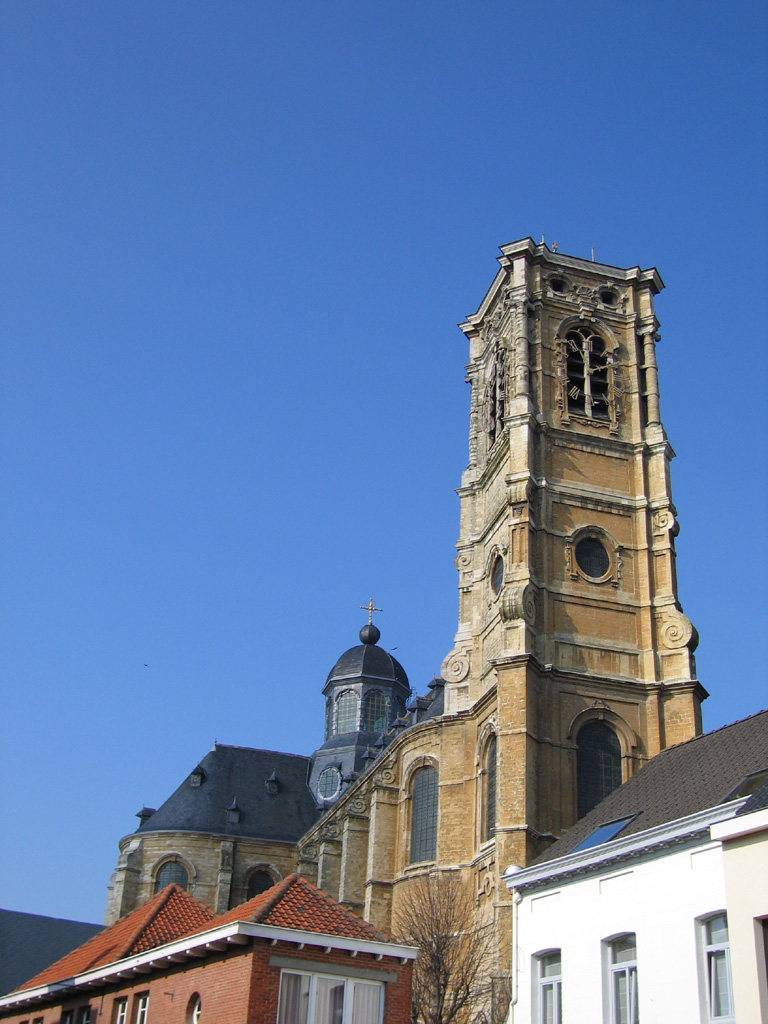
Grimbergen abbey church

In the 12th century, the name of the hamlet was Grentberghis, which came from the Old Dutch Grientbergen, meaning mounds of coarse sand. A community of Augustinian monks had already tried to settle here a century earlier during the reign of Godfrey III, Duke of Lower Lorraine, but it was only in the early 12th century that their religious community prospered. Under the leadership of Norbert of Xanten, the Norbertine monks built the Grimbergen Abbey here in 1128, founding a beer brewery. A few years later, the animosity between the powerful Grimbergen family and their then infant overlord Godfrey III of Leuven precipitated the Wars of Grimbergen. The unrest caused the destruction of the local castle by the Duke of Brabant, the move of the ruling Grimbergen lord to nearby Ninove, and the parceling of his territory. The city's coat of arms dates from that period.

At the beginning of the 14th century, half of the territory became part of the estate of the House of Nassau. Like everywhere else in Flanders, the Wars of Religion of the end of the 16th century caused widespread destruction. In 1752, Anne, Princess Royal and Princess of Orange, who had received the land from her consort William IV, Prince of Orange-Nassau, ceded the barony to the Prince of Berghes, who owned the other half, thereby reuniting the original land of Grimbergen as a single, but short-lived, princedom.

=== After the French Revolution ===
The feudal regime and the power of the lords came to an abrupt end under the French Regime in 1794. The clerical powers of the abbey were abrogated a couple of years later, until a few years after the Belgian Revolution of 1830.

Up until then, the town's character was mostly rural and agricultural. In the middle of the 19th century, the new road linking Vilvoorde to Aalst and the Brussels-Willebroek canal started attracting industrial concerns. The vicinal tramway arrived in 1887, and a local airfield was built after World War I.

== Sights ==
Grimbergen is home to the following sights:

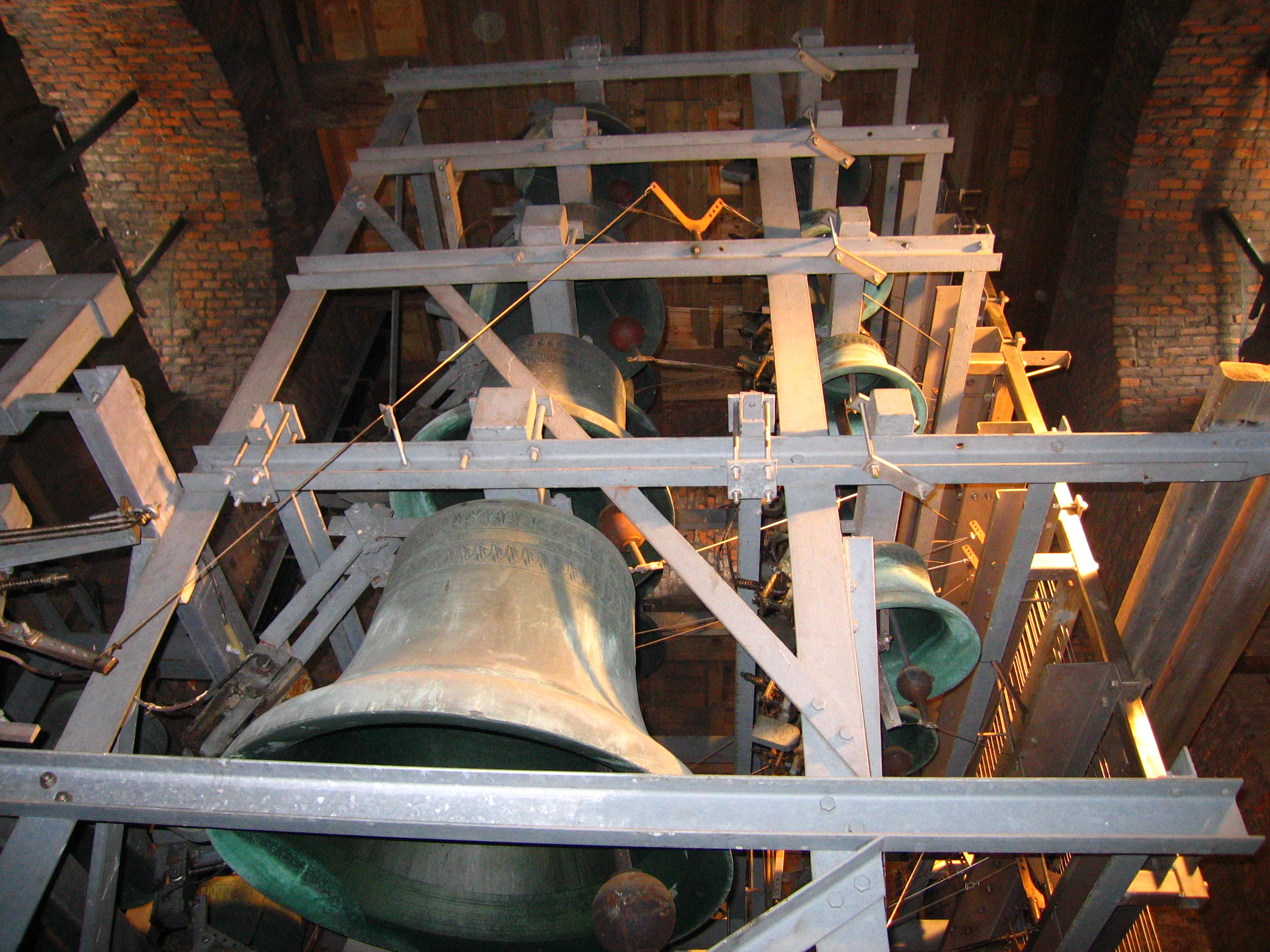
Grimbergen carillon

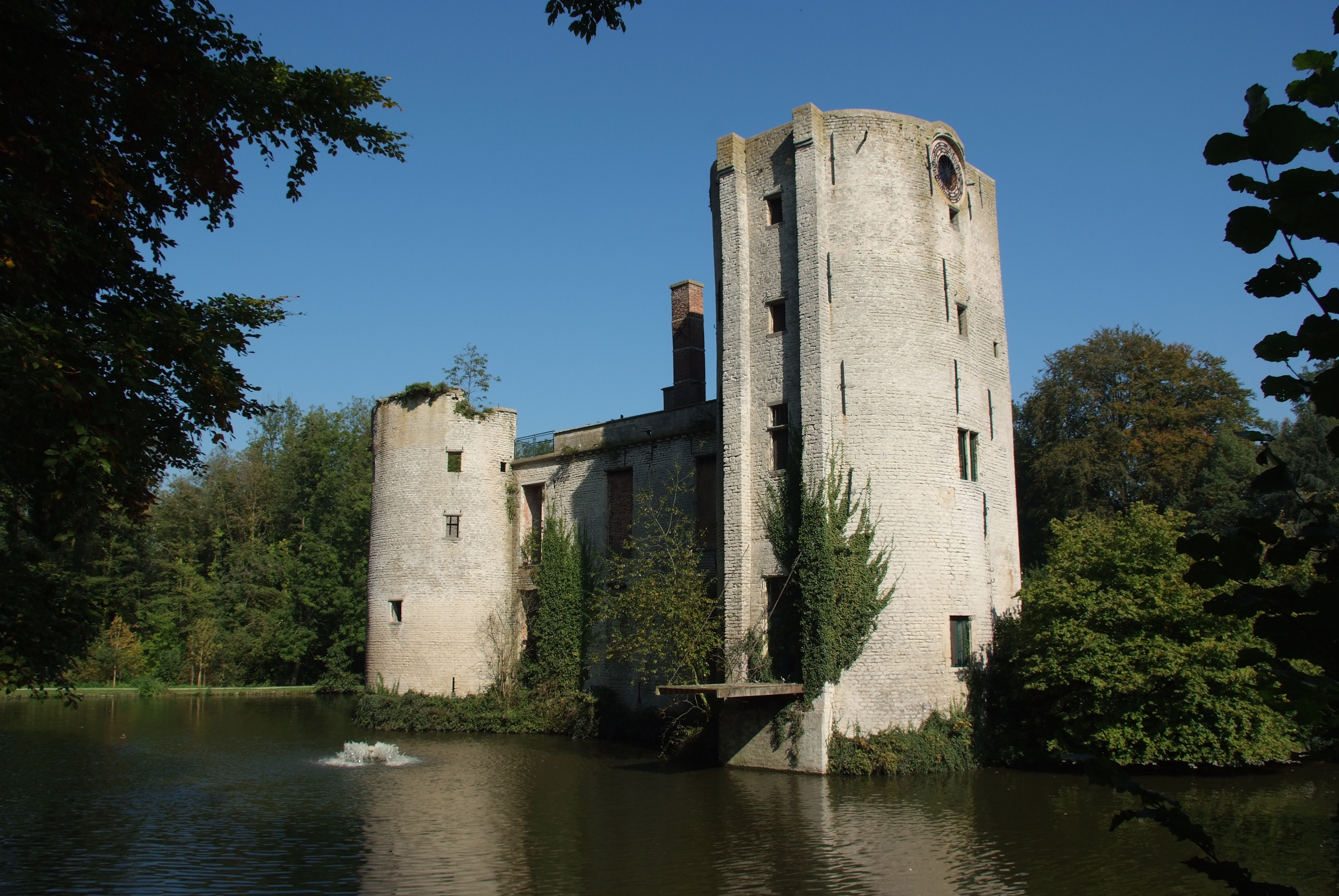
The "Prinsenkasteel"

- The majestic church of the Grimbergen Abbey, dedicated to Saint Servatius, patron saint of the city, was rebuilt several times since its foundation in 1128. The current construction dates from 1660 and ranks among the most harmonious Baroque buildings in Belgium. The tower houses a 49-bell carillon. The houses lining the central square in front of the church have also been rebuilt in the original style of the 18th century. In 1999, the church of Grimbergen was given the title of basilica.
- The Grimbergen beer museum is located next door and gives its visitors an opportunity to taste the famous local brew.
- The Volkssterrenwacht Mira is the oldest public astronomical observatory in Belgium. Founded in 1967, it is located in the former farm dependencies of the abbey. An extension was added in 2000 to the original observatory.
- Grimbergen is particularly rich in castles, counting four of them on its territory, including the beautiful 17th century Renaissance-style Guldendal, and the ruins of the lords of Grimbergen's old keep now named the Prinsenkasteel. It also counts several farms dating from the 17th century as well as two medieval water mills.

== Demographics ==
Group of origin	Year	
Group of origin	2023	
Group of origin	Number	%
Belgians with Belgian background	22,068	56.06%
Belgians with foreign background	12,067	30.65%
Neighboring country	991	2.52%
EU27 (excluding neighboring country)	1,932	4.91%
Outside EU 27	9,144	23.23%
Non-Belgians	5,233	13.29%
Neighboring country	711	1.81%
EU27 (excluding neighboring country)	2,663	6.76%
Outside EU 27	1,859	4.72%
Total	39,368	100%

== Events and sports ==
- The main annual event is the Sint-Servaasommegang, loosely translated as procession of Saint Servatius. It dates from 1280 and takes place on the Saint's birthday, May 13, or on the first following Sunday.
- A well-attended kermesse takes place on the first Sunday of September.
- A nativity scene is organized in the abbey church around Christmas.
- The main football club used to be K.F.C. Strombeek, but is now named F.C. Molenbeek Brussels Strombeek and located in neighboring Sint-Jans-Molenbeek.
- Since 2015 Grimbergen has its own field hockey club named Merode Hockey Grimbergen. After only three years they got enough funding together to build a state of the art hockey field. Starting from January 2019 the club will be playing their own field at the Populierendallaan 111.

== Notable people ==
- August De Winter (1925–2005), politician
- Hugo Broos (born 1952), former football player and coach
- Alison Van Uytvanck (born 1994), tennis player
- Pieter Timmers, (born, 1988), swimmer
