= Constant Vanden Stock Stadium =

Football stadium in Brussels, Belgium

- Stade Constant Vanden Stock (French); Constant Vanden Stockstadion (Dutch)
- Lotto Park, Astrid Park
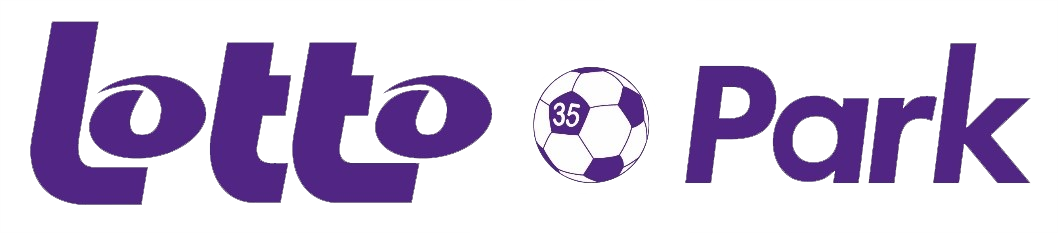

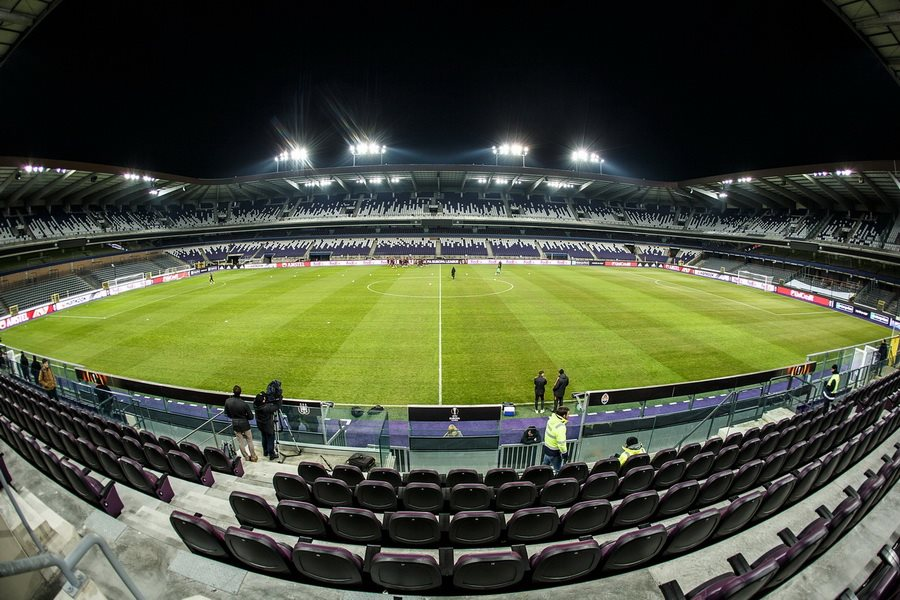
- Interior of the stadium
- Interactive map of Constant Vanden Stock Stadium
- Former names: Emile Versé Stadium
- Location: Avenue Théo Verbeeck / Théo Verbeecklaan 2, 1070 Anderlecht, Brussels-Capital Region, Belgium
- Coordinates: 50°50′3″N 4°17′54″E
- Operator: RSC Anderlecht
- Capacity: 21,500
- Surface: Desso GrassMaster
- Field size: 105 m × 68 m (344 ft × 223 ft)
- Public transit: 5 Saint-Guidon/Sint-Guido and Veeweyde/Veeweide

Construction
- Groundbreaking: 1917
- Opened: 1917
- Renovated: 1983, 1985, 1987, 1992, 2012

Tenant
- RSC Anderlecht

The Constant Vanden Stock Stadium (French: Stade Constant Vanden Stock; Dutch: Constant Vanden Stockstadion), also known as the Lotto Park for sponsorship reasons, is a football stadium in the municipality of Anderlecht in Brussels, Belgium. It is home to RSC Anderlecht. It also hosted the UEFA Euro 1972 semi-final between Hungary and the Soviet Union, as well as several games of the Belgium national football team. The capacity nowadays is 21,500 spectators. The former amount of 40,000 seats and standing places was gradually reduced due to safety measures.

The stadium is located at 2, avenue Théo Verbeeck/Théo Verbeecklaan, on the border of Astrid Park.

== History ==
=== Early history ===
Until shortly after the First World War, the home games of Royal Sporting Club Anderlecht were played on a football pitch in the Rue Verheyden/Verheydenstraat. In 1917, R.S.C. Anderlecht installed, on the border of Meir Park (later renamed Astrid Park), a new stadium with only one wooden stand. In 1918, the complex was named the Émile Versé Stadium (French: Stade Émile Versé, Dutch: Émile Verséstadion), after the industrialist Émile Versé, who was also the club's first president. Over time, concrete stands were set up.

In 1946, RSC Anderlecht received permission to carry out work to expand the facilities at the Émile Versé Stadium. In 1969, construction work began on the Henri Simonet sports hall, which was completed in 1971. On 20 September 1980, 38,349 viewers attended a game against Standard Liège at the Versé Stadium, the largest number of spectators to attend a match at the stadium ever.

The 1980s were marked by several phases of modernisation. Between 1983 and 1991, the stadium was completely rebuilt and renamed the Constant Vanden Stock Stadium (French: Stade Constant Vanden Stock, Dutch: Constant Vanden Stockstadion), after the club's then-chairman, Constant Vanden Stock. The renovated stadium was inaugurated with a gala match against FC Barcelona. In 1992, Anderlecht won the International Olympic Committee award for architecture in sport. The cost of the renovation works amounted to 1.5 billion Belgian francs. The club received no government support but financed the renovation works with the proceeds from lodges and business seats.

=== 21st century ===
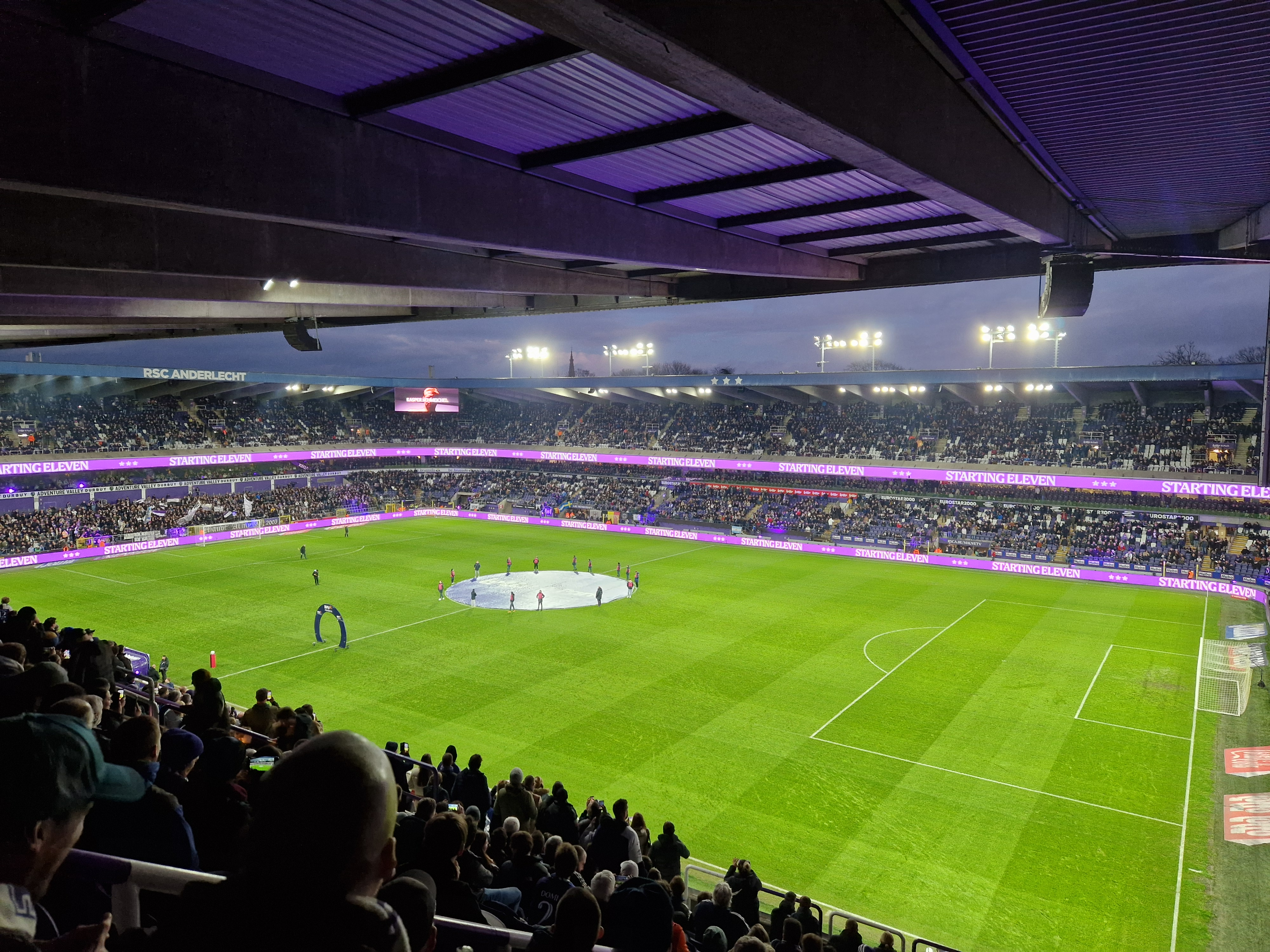
RSC Anderlecht home game in 2024

In the summer of 2012, RSC Anderlecht carried out work to bring the stadium up to UEFA standards. Its capacity was thus decreased to 21,500 seats but it offers more comfort, more security, as well as new VIP areas and a brand new press room. All seats in the stadium are now equipped with a backrest. The aisles have been widened by 40 cm (16 in) for safety reasons, rail seats for safe standing were fitted on the terracing behind each goal, while stand 1 is now equipped with 651 outdoor VIP seats. During European competitions, the stadium is all-seated, which decreases its capacity even more.

In 2010, the son of Constant Vanden Stock, Roger, announced together with RSC Anderlecht's manager Herman Van Holsbeeck that the club was going to build a third ring above the two existing ones in order to increase the stadium's capacity to accommodate 30,000 spectators. The plans were put on hold when in 2014, Anderlecht agreed to become anchor tenant of the planned 60,000+ new national stadium in Brussels. After Anderlecht withdrew from the project, the plans for an expansion of its own stadium were eventually also shelved in 2022, due to financial and political reasons.

In 2019, the stadium was officially rebranded as the Lotto Park, for sponsorship reasons.

== Location and features ==
The stadium is located at 2, avenue Théo Verbeeck/Théo Verbeecklaan, near Saint-Guidon/Sint-Guido metro station. Rival supporters must stop at Aumale metro station for UEFA Champions League matches due to security measures. The stadium hosts a former one-star restaurant (Le Saint-Guidon) and a cafeteria, as well as the official club fanshop and ticketing booths.

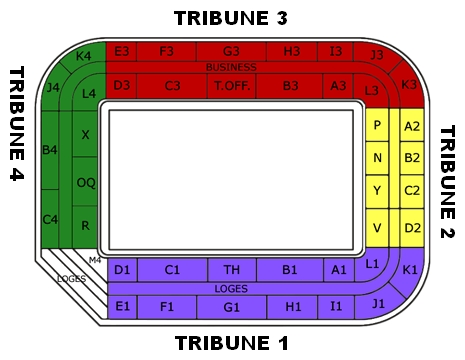
Map of the stadium

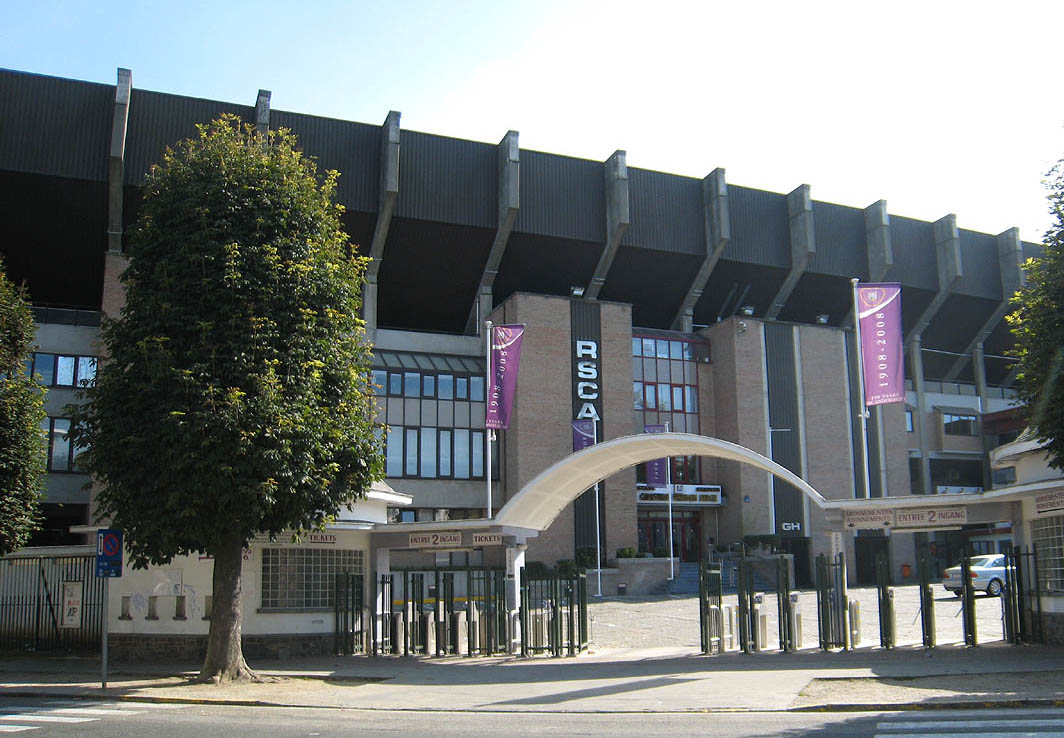
Outside view

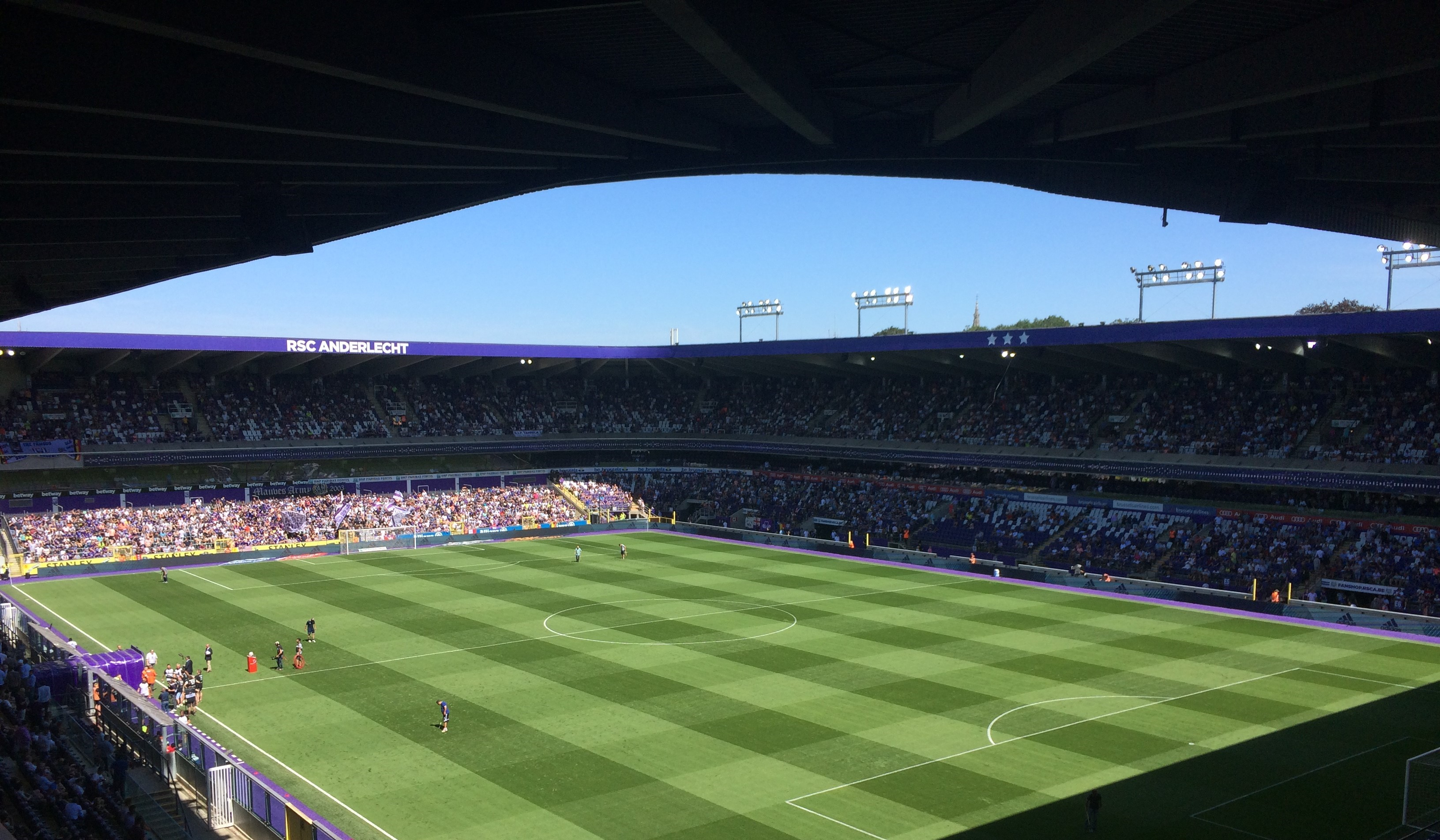
Inside view

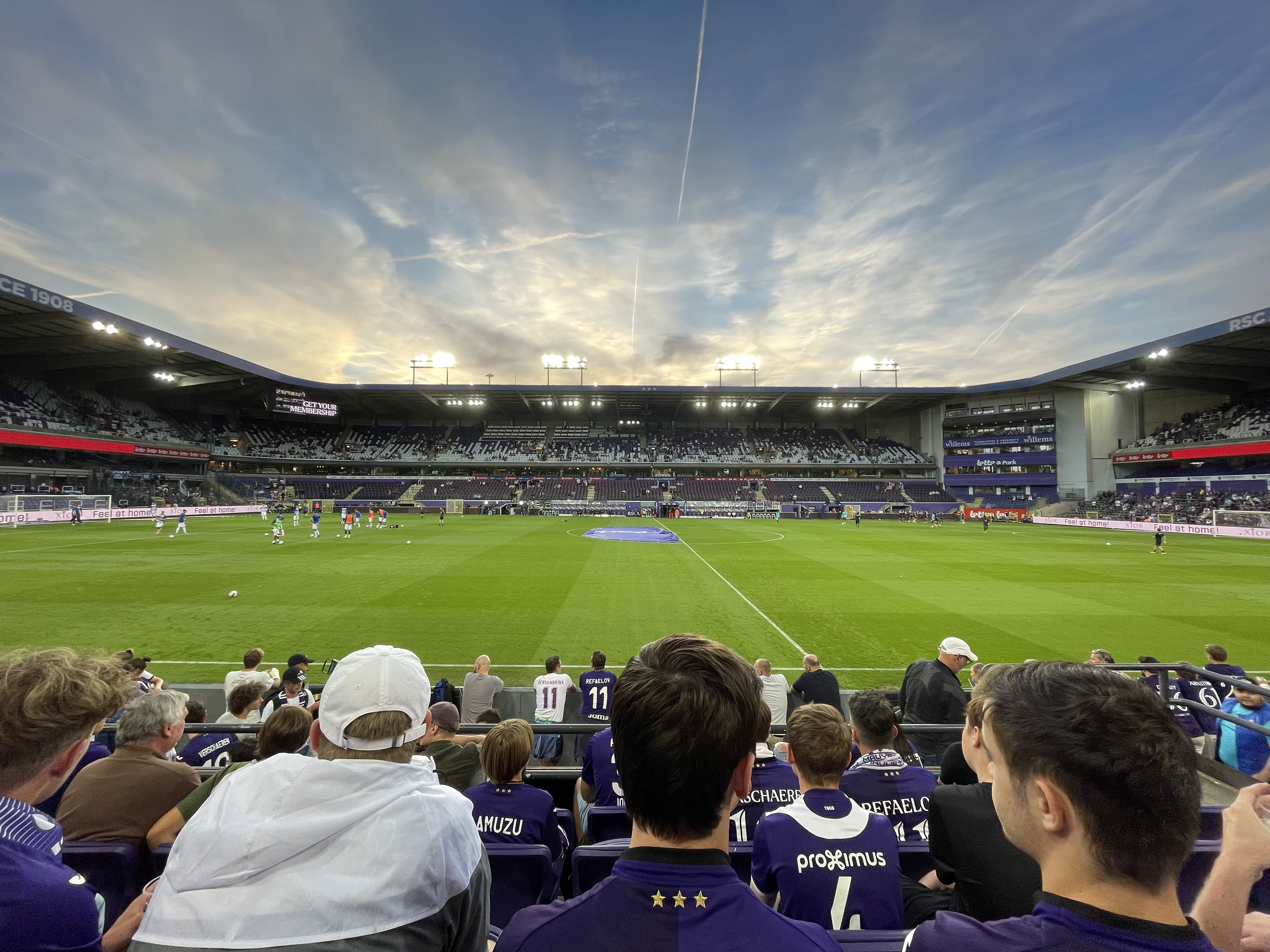
View from the field level

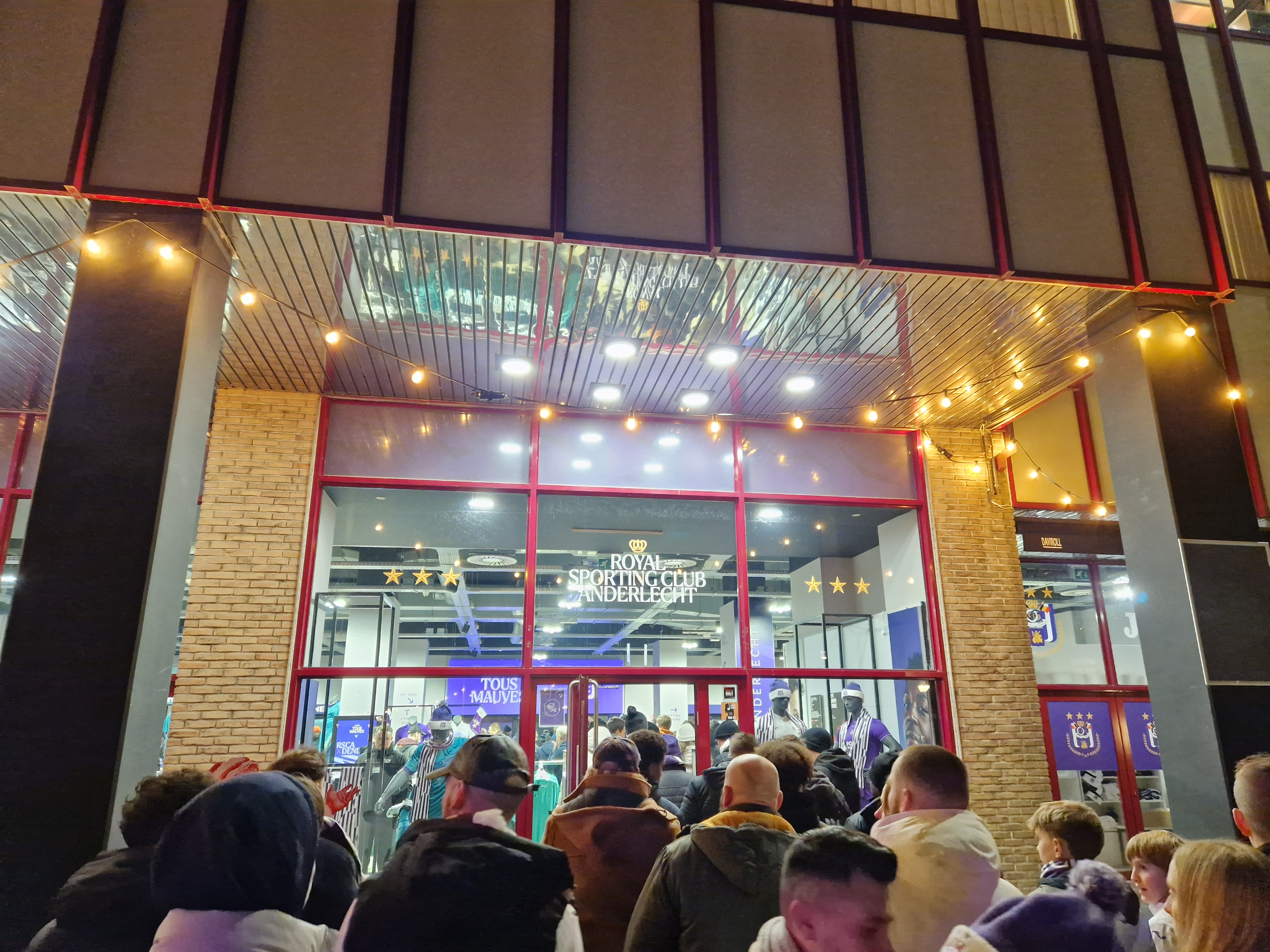
RSCA fanshop
