= Milou Jeunehomme =

Belgian politician

- Born: Emile-Edgar Jeunehomme; 8 April 1924; Liège, Belgium
- Died: 19 January 2001 (aged 76)
- Occupation: politician

Emile-Edgar (Milou) Jeunehomme (1924–2001) was a Belgian liberal politician.

On 15 January 1958 he became a member of parliament for the district Liège. He played for a long time an important role in the liberal party under Omer Vanaudenhove but gradually withdrew himself from politics after 1969. He was co-president of the liberal party in 1968–1969, together with Norbert Hougardy.

== Sources ==
- Presidents of the Belgian liberal party
