= 1977 Belgian general election =

- 17 April 1977

212 seats in the Chamber of Representatives
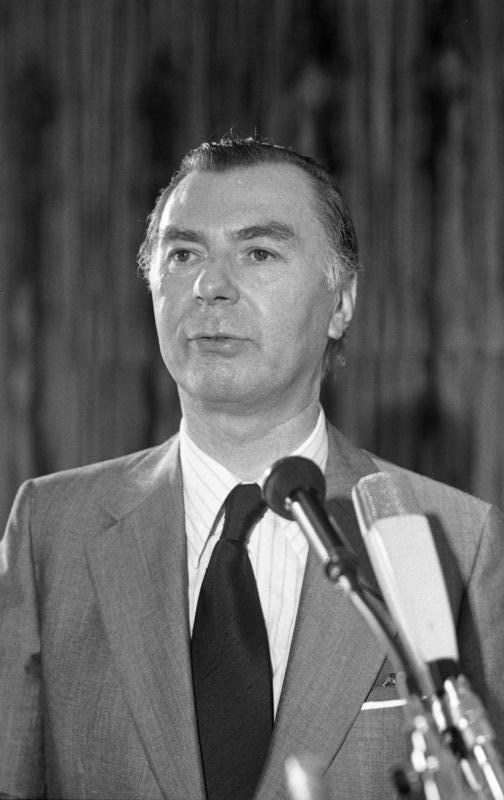

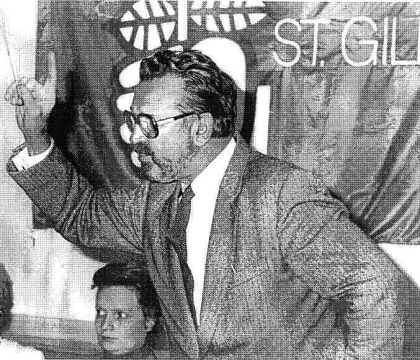

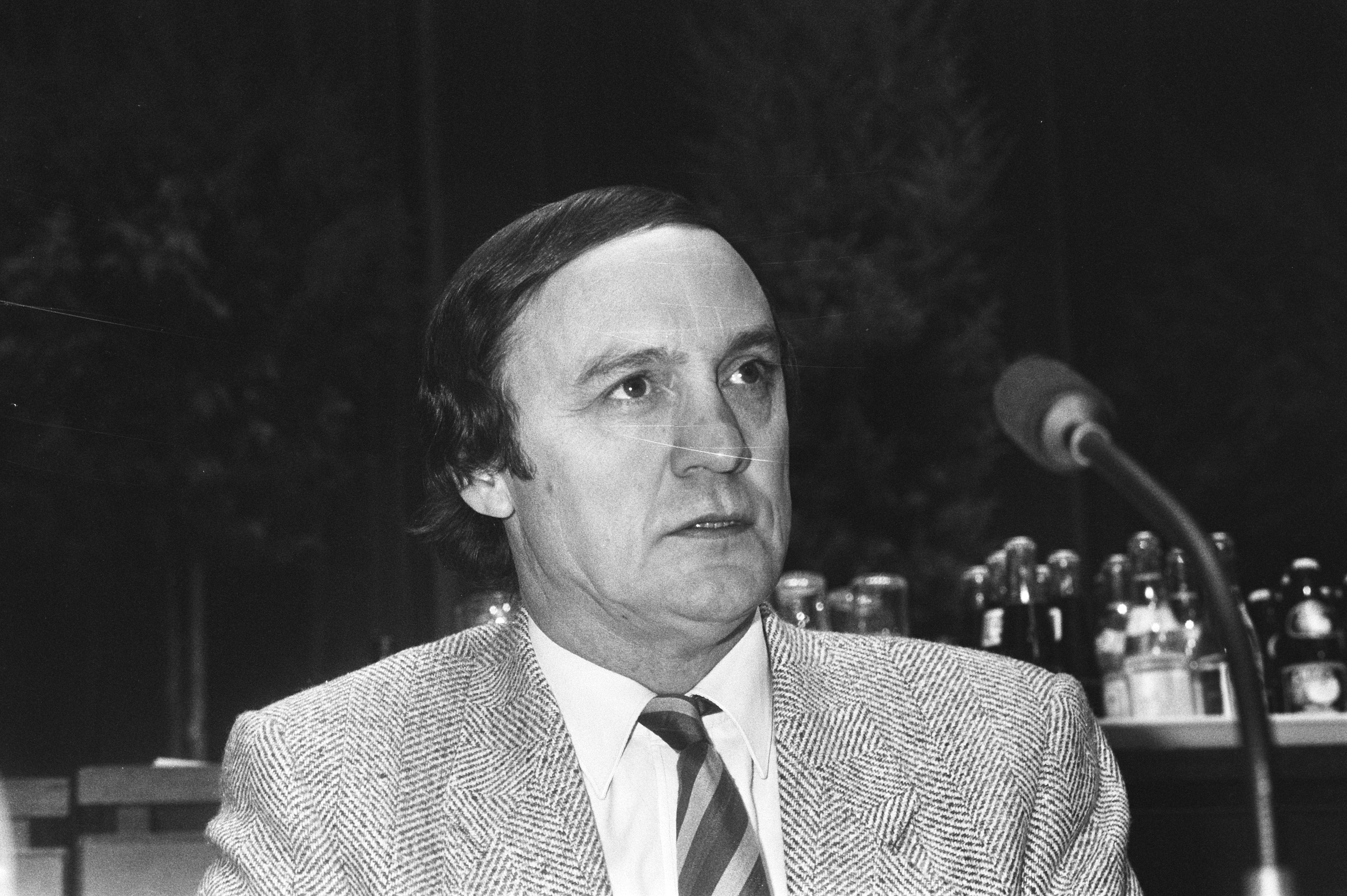
	First party	Second party	Third party
Leader	Leo Tindemans	André Cools	Karel Van Miert
Party	CVP	Socialist	Socialist
Leader since	Candidate for PM	1973	1977
Last election	50 seats, 23.25%	59 seats, 26.66%^{[a]}	59 seats, 26.66%^{[a]}
Seats won	56	34	27
Seat change	▲6	▼15	▼22
Popular vote	1,460,757	602,132	725,513
Percentage	26.20%	10.80%	13.01%
Swing	▲2.95%	▼15.86%	▼13.65%
	Fourth party	Fifth party	Sixth party
	PSC	VU	PVV
Leader	Georges Gramme	Hugo Schiltz	Frans Grootjans
Party	cdH	VU	Open Vld
Leader since	1976	1975	1973
Last election	22 seats, 9.09%	22 seats, 10.20%	30 seats, 15.19%
Seats won	24	20	17
Seat change	▲2	▼2	▼13
Popular vote	406,694	559,567	475,917
Percentage	7.29%	10.04%	8.54%
Swing	▼1.80%	▼0.16%	▼6.65%
- Results by constituency for the Chamber of Representatives
Government before election
Tindemans I
CVP-PSC-PVV-PRL
Government after election
Tindemans II
CVP-PSC-BSP/PSB-VU-FDF

General elections were held in Belgium on 17 April 1977. The result was a victory for the Christian People's Party, which won 56 of the 212 seats in the Chamber of Representatives and 28 of the 106 seats in the Senate. Voter turnout was 95.1%. Elections were also held for the nine provincial councils and for the Council of the German Cultural Community.

== Results ==
=== Chamber of Representatives ===
Party or alliance		Votes	%	Seats	+/–
Belgian Socialist Party	BSP (Flanders)	725,513	13.01	27	New
Belgian Socialist Party	PSB-BSP	602,132	10.80	34	New
Belgian Socialist Party	PSB (Wallonia)	145,771	2.61	0	0
Belgian Socialist Party	Total	1,473,416	26.43	61	+2
Christian People's Party		1,460,757	26.20	56	+6
People's Union		559,567	10.04	20	–2
Party for Freedom and Progress	PVV	475,917	8.54	17	New
Party for Freedom and Progress	PLP of Wallonia	5,220	0.09	0	–
Party for Freedom and Progress	Total	481,137	8.63	17	–13
Christian Social Party		406,694	7.29	24	+2
Party of Reforms and Freedom of Wallonia	PRLW	191,196	3.43	16	New
Party of Reforms and Freedom of Wallonia	PRLW–PRF	107,015	1.92	0	New
Party of Reforms and Freedom of Wallonia	PRLW–Liberal Party	92,178	1.65	0	New
Party of Reforms and Freedom of Wallonia	Total	390,389	7.00	16	New
Democratic Front of the Francophones		263,104	4.72	11	New
Communist Party of Belgium	KPB/PCB	62,410	1.12	0	–2
Communist Party of Belgium	PCB–UDP	51,930	0.93	0	New
Communist Party of Belgium	PCB (Wallonia)	37,104	0.67	2	New
Communist Party of Belgium	Total	151,444	2.72	2	0
PSC–CSP		138,361	2.48	0	New
Walloon Rally		132,773	2.38	4	–7
PSB–Walloon Rally		33,598	0.60	1	New
All Power to the Workers	AMADA (Flanders)	22,919	0.41	0	New
All Power to the Workers	TPO (Wallonia)	1,980	0.04	0	New
All Power to the Workers	Total	24,899	0.45	0	0
Revolutionary Workers' League	RAL (Flanders)	8,562	0.15	0	New
Revolutionary Workers' League	LRT-RAL	3,127	0.06	0	New
Revolutionary Workers' League	LRT (Wallonia)	2,905	0.05	0	New
Revolutionary Workers' League	Total	14,594	0.26	0	New
ECOLOG		11,839	0.21	0	New
Party of German-speaking Belgians		7,735	0.14	0	0
ECOLOG–Snow White and Seven Dwarfs Party		4,321	0.08	0	New
Ecolo		3,834	0.07	0	New
United Feminist Party	PFU (Wallonia)	1,514	0.03	0	New
United Feminist Party	VFP (Flanders)	967	0.02	0	New
United Feminist Party	Total	2,481	0.04	0	0
Agalev		2,435	0.04	0	New
Francophone Women's Front		2,099	0.04	0	New
Centre Party–Belgian Radical Union		1,547	0.03	0	0
Return to Liège		1,421	0.03	0	0
Union of Belgians		1,083	0.02	0	New
People's National Front		994	0.02	0	New
Kaganovemus		884	0.02	0	0
ECOLOGIQUE		777	0.01	0	New
Ecologie Wallonia		605	0.01	0	New
Communist Party of Belgium – Marxist–Leninist		533	0.01	0	New
United Independent Party		443	0.01	0	New
Flanders–Brussels 77		377	0.01	0	New
Union of Marxist–Leninist Communists of Belgium		222	0.00	0	New
UC–MEUNIER		199	0.00	0	New
Revolutionary Workers' Party		175	0.00	0	New
Parti Pris		169	0.00	0	New
European Workers Party		152	0.00	0	New
Total		5,575,058	100.00	212	0
Valid votes		5,575,058	92.82		
Invalid/blank votes		431,153	7.18		
Total votes		6,006,211	100.00		
Registered voters/turnout		6,316,662	95.09		
Source: Belgian Elections

=== Senate ===
Party	Votes	%	Seats	+/–
Christian People's Party	1,446,806	26.18	28	+1
Belgian Socialist Party (Wallonia)	756,401	13.69	19	New
Belgian Socialist Party (Flanders)	719,533	13.02	12	New
People's Union	562,894	10.19	10	0
Christian Social Party	522,613	9.46	11	+1
Party for Freedom and Progress	472,645	8.55	9	New
Party of Reforms and Freedom of Wallonia	316,292	5.72	7	New
Democratic Front of the Francophones	246,367	4.46	6	New
Walloon Rally	158,642	2.87	2	New
Communist Party of Belgium	108,000	1.95	1	0
Liberal Party	70,458	1.28	0	New
PCB–UDP	50,749	0.92	0	New
PSB–Walloon Rally	33,945	0.61	1	New
All Power to the Workers	27,693	0.50	0	New
Party of German-speaking Belgians	10,213	0.18	0	0
Ecolo	7,558	0.14	0	New
Party for Freedom and Progress (Wallonia)	5,305	0.10	0	0
United Feminist Party	3,413	0.06	0	0
Agalev	3,270	0.06	0	New
Union of Belgians	1,182	0.02	0	New
United Independent Party	896	0.02	0	New
Revolutionary Workers' League	387	0.01	0	New
Belgian Radical Union	207	0.00	0	0
Other parties	502	0.01	0	–
Total	5,525,971	100.00	106	0
Valid votes	5,525,971	91.91		
Invalid/blank votes	486,091	8.09		
Total votes	6,012,062	100.00		
Registered voters/turnout	6,012,062	100.00		
Source: Belgian Elections
