= 1981 Belgian general election =

← 1978	8 November 1981	1985 →

212 seats in the Chamber of Representatives
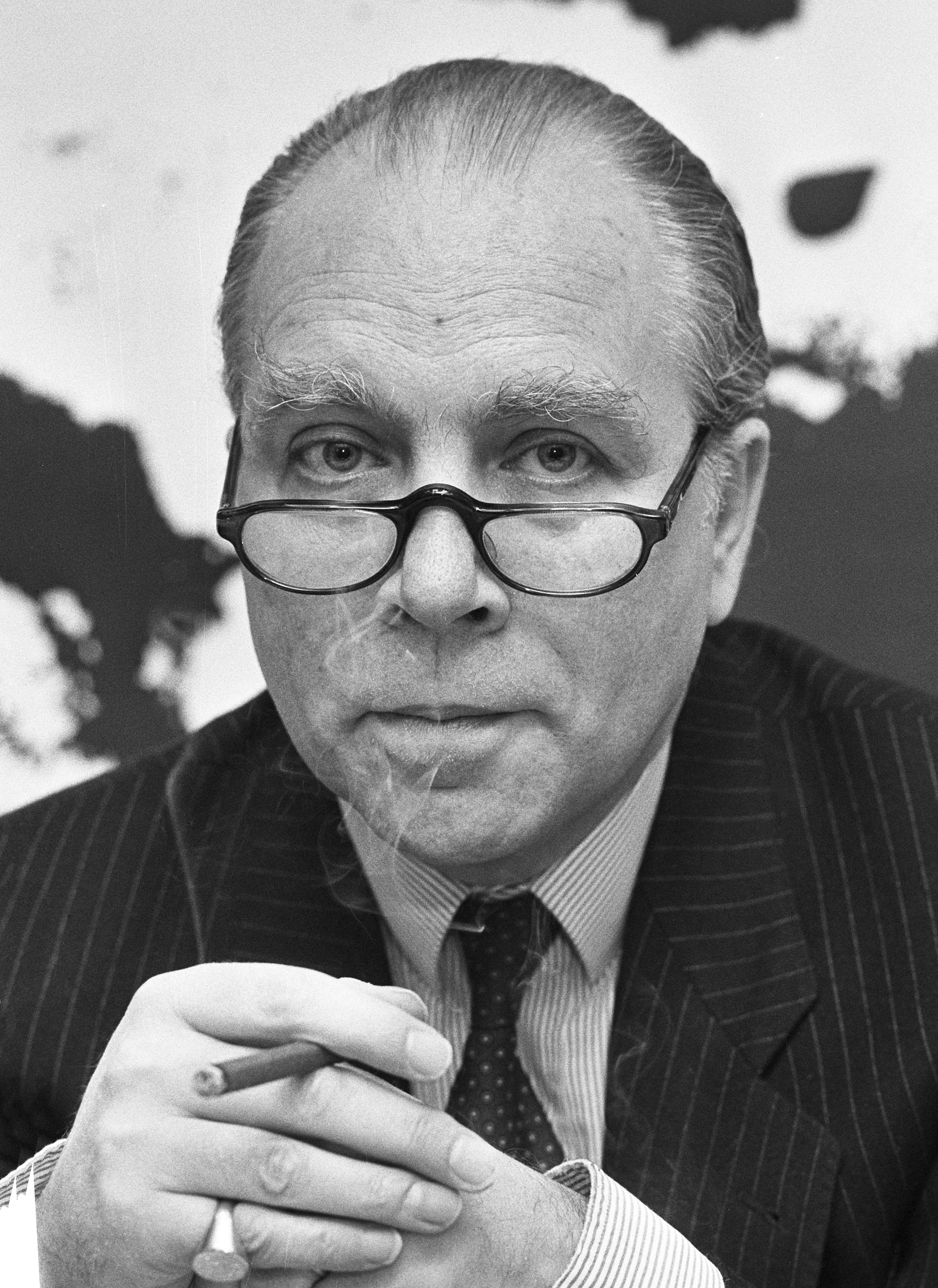

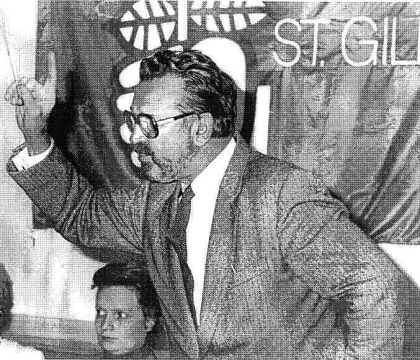

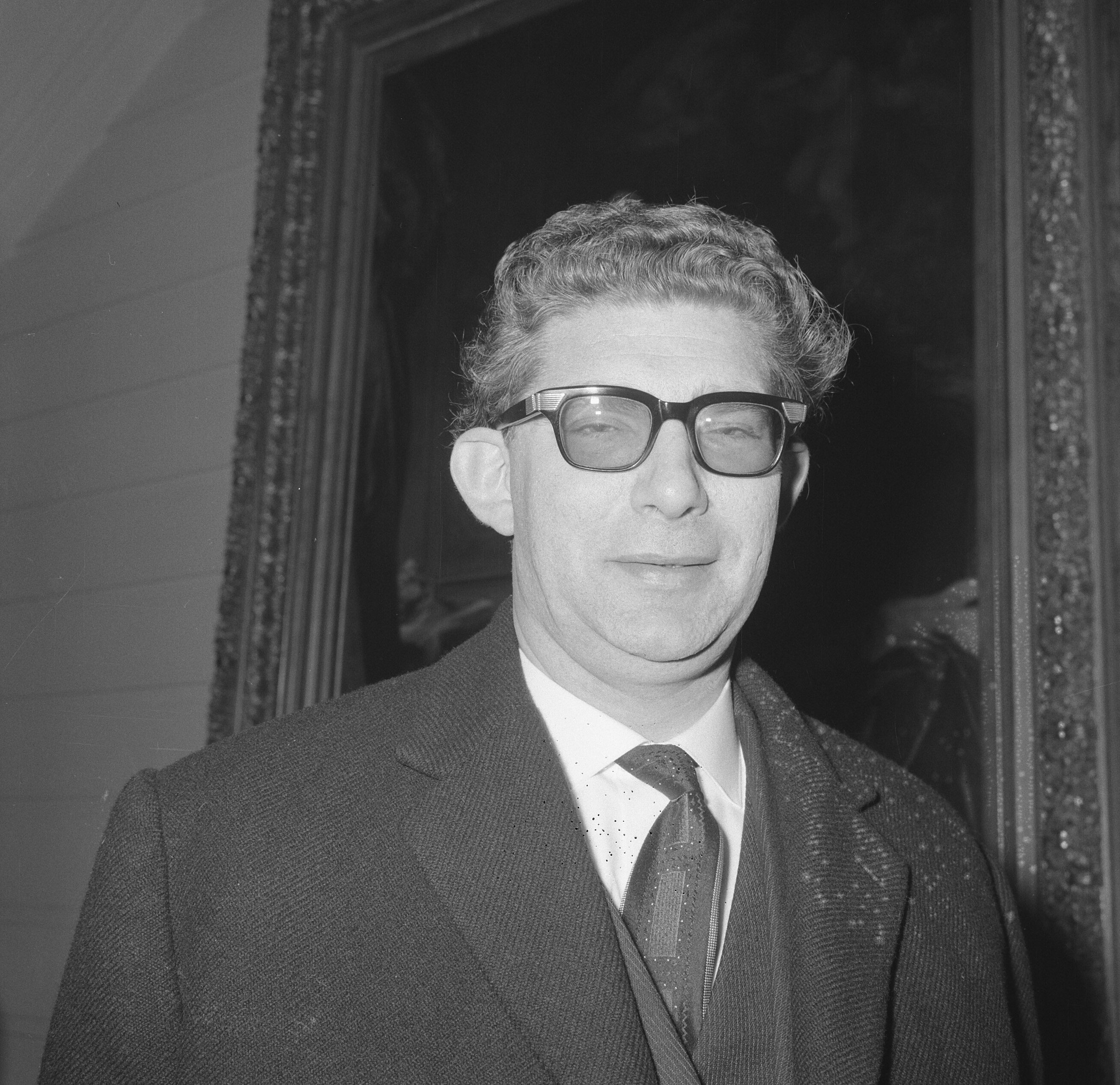

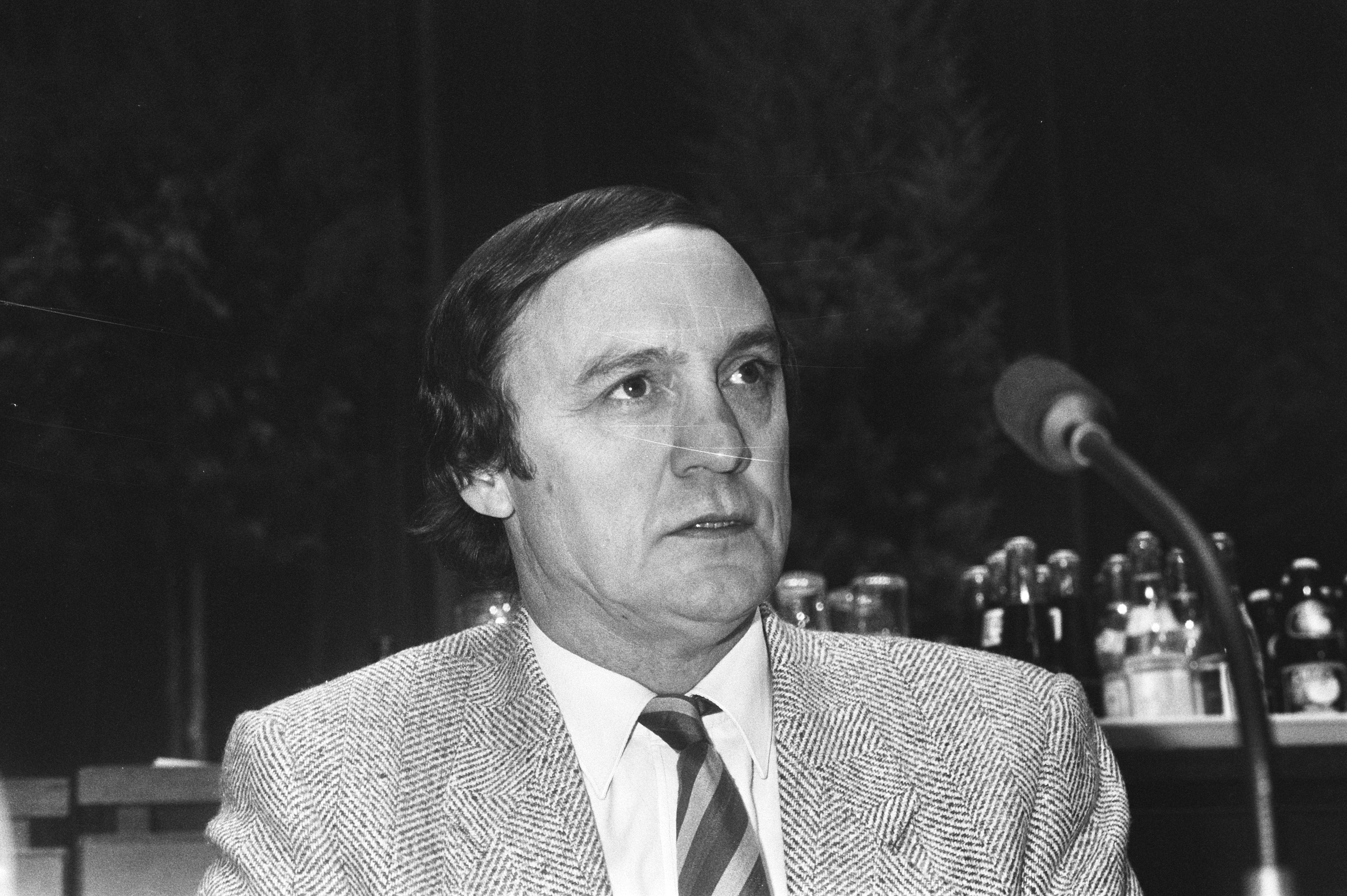

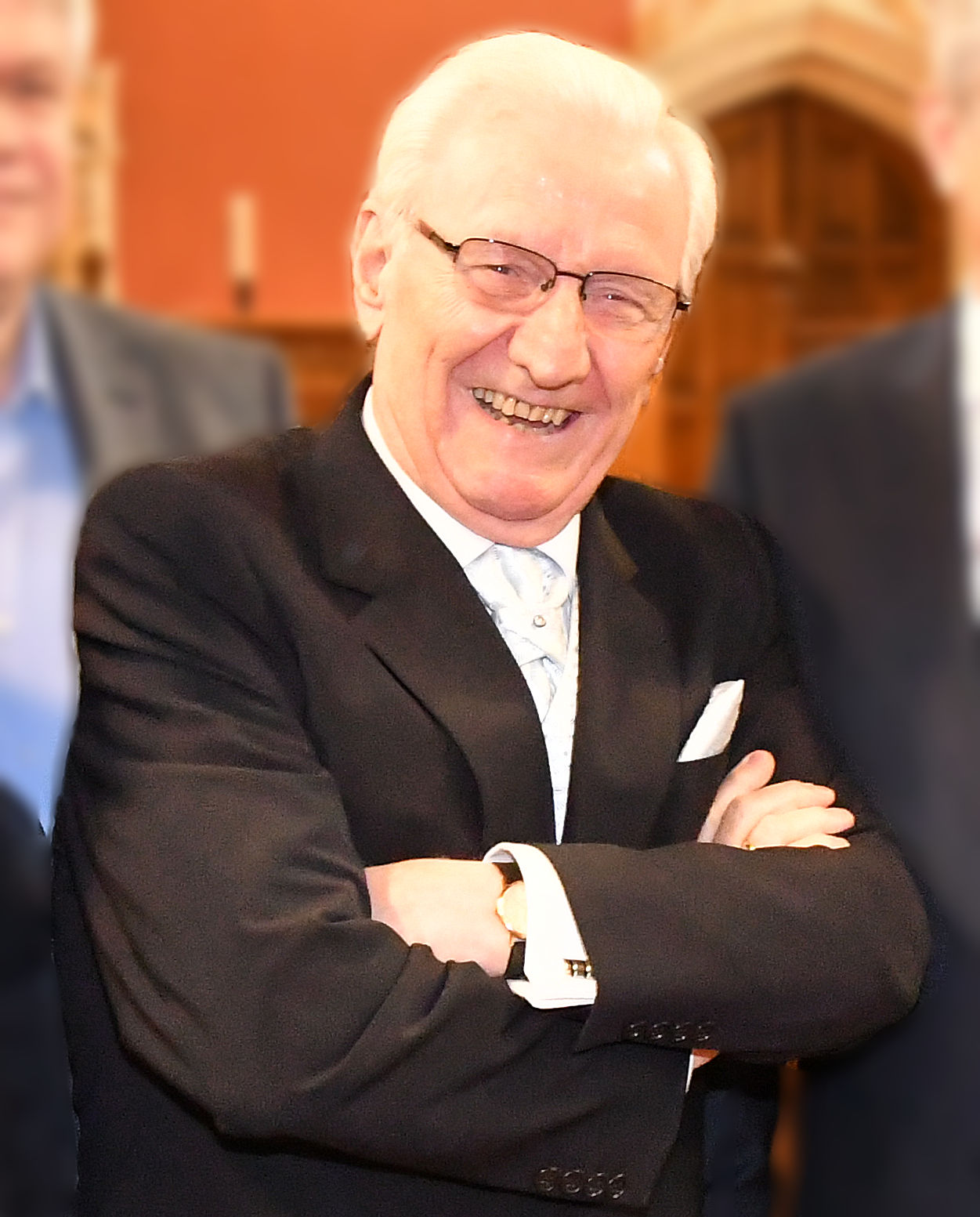
	First party	Second party	Third party
Leader	Mark Eyskens	André Cools	Willy De Clercq
Party	CVP	PS	Open Vld
Leader since	Candidate for PM	1978	1977
Last election	57 seats, 26.14%	31 seats, 12.46%	22 seats, 10.36%
Seats won	43	35	28
Seat change	▼14	▲4	▲6
Popular vote	1,165,239	733,137	776,871
Percentage	19.34%	12.17%	12.89%
Swing	▼6.80%	▼0.29%	▲2.53%
	Fourth party	Fifth party	Sixth party
		PRL
Leader	Karel Van Miert	Jean Gol	Vic Anciaux
Party	sp.a	PRL	VU
Leader since	1978	1979	1979
Last election	26 seats, 12.37%	15 seats, 4.64%	14 seats, 7.02%
Seats won	26	24	20
Seat change	Steady	▲9	▲6
Popular vote	744,593	480,380	588,436
Percentage	12.36%	7.97%	9.77%
Swing	▼0.01%	▲3.33%	▲2.75%
Government before election
M. Eyskens
CVP-PSC-PS-SP
Government after election
Martens V
CVP-PSC-PVV-PRL

General elections were held in Belgium on 8 November 1981. Voter turnout was 94.5% in the Chamber election and 94.6% in the Senate election. Elections were also held for the nine provincial councils and for the Council of the German Cultural Community. They were the first elections after the voting age was lowered from 21 to 18. This contributed to the success of the socialist parties and the green parties (Agalev and Ecolo).

The traditionally largest Christian People's Party saw significant losses, with only 43 of the 212 seats in the Chamber of Representatives. The result was considered an election upset.

== Results ==
=== Chamber of Representatives ===
Party	Votes	%	Seats	+/–
Christian People's Party	1,165,239	19.34	43	–14
Party for Freedom and Progress	776,871	12.89	28	+6
Parti Socialiste	764,921	12.70	35	+4
Socialistische Partij	744,593	12.36	26	0
People's Union	588,436	9.77	20	+6
Liberal Reformist Party	480,380	7.97	24	+9
Social Christian Party	390,896	6.49	18	–7
FDF–Walloon Rally	253,720	4.21	8	–3
Democratic Union for the Respect of Labour	163,727	2.72	3	+2
Ecolo	151,826	2.52	2	+2
Agalev	138,575	2.30	2	+2
Communist Party of Belgium	138,978	2.31	2	–2
Vlaams Blok	66,424	1.10	1	0
Workers' Party of Belgium	45,804	0.76	0	New
Christian Social Party	39,961	0.66	0	New
PRL–PFF	35,925	0.60	0	New
WALLON	31,061	0.52	0	New
Party of German-speaking Belgians	8,397	0.14	0	0
Party of New Forces	7,581	0.13	0	0
Revolutionary Workers' League	7,110	0.12	0	0
Revolutionary Workers' League for Socialism	5,241	0.09	0	New
BLANCO	4,118	0.07	0	New
Direct Democracy	3,545	0.06	0	New
Belgian National Party	3,357	0.06	0	New
Francophone National Union	2,914	0.05	0	New
Party for Christian Politics Alternative	1,785	0.03	0	New
United Feminist Party	856	0.01	0	0
Appeal to Youth	838	0.01	0	New
Democratic Radical Union	598	0.01	0	New
List 12	588	0.01	0	New
List 14	372	0.01	0	New
Namur Independent Candidate	210	0.00	0	New
List 13	180	0.00	0	New
Total	6,025,027	100.00	212	0
Valid votes	6,025,027	92.66		
Invalid/blank votes	477,043	7.34		
Total votes	6,502,070	100.00		
Registered voters/turnout	6,877,466	94.54		
Source: Belgian Elections

=== Senate ===
Party	Votes	%	Seats	+/–
Christian People's Party	1,149,353	19.26	22	–7
Party for Freedom and Progress	781,137	13.09	14	+3
Parti Socialiste	755,512	12.66	18	New
Socialistische Partij	732,126	12.27	13	New
People's Union	587,002	9.84	10	+3
Liberal Reformist Party	515,868	8.64	11	New
Social Christian Party	414,733	6.95	8	–4
FDF–Walloon Rally	255,727	4.28	4	–3
Democratic Union for the Respect of Labour	164,131	2.75	1	+1
Ecolo	153,989	2.58	3	+3
Communist Party of Belgium	140,577	2.36	1	0
Agalev	121,016	2.03	1	New
Vlaams Blok	71,733	1.20	0	0
Workers' Party of Belgium	49,577	0.83	0	New
WALLON	30,632	0.51	0	New
Party of German-speaking Belgians	8,770	0.15	0	0
Revolutionary Workers' League	8,450	0.14	0	0
Revolutionary Workers' League for Socialism	5,894	0.10	0	New
Party of New Forces	5,317	0.09	0	New
ECOLOS	2,796	0.05	0	New
Francophone National Union	2,721	0.05	0	New
Direct Democracy	2,295	0.04	0	New
Party of New Forces (Wallonia)	2,092	0.04	0	New
GOOSSE	1,511	0.03	0	New
BELGE	1,326	0.02	0	New
United Feminist Party	1,052	0.02	0	0
Protest from the Small Saver	737	0.01	0	New
Democratic Radical Union	629	0.01	0	New
List 12	626	0.01	0	New
PAIX	611	0.01	0	New
List 14	378	0.01	0	New
List 13	111	0.00	0	New
Total	5,968,429	100.00	106	0
Valid votes	5,968,429	91.78		
Invalid/blank votes	534,297	8.22		
Total votes	6,502,726	100.00		
Registered voters/turnout	6,877,466	94.55		
Source: Belgian Elections
