= Mark Eyskens =

Belgian politician

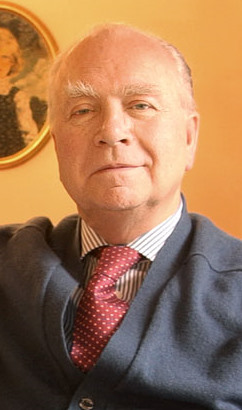
- Eyskens in 2011

Prime Minister of Belgium
- In office 6 April 1981 – 17 December 1981
- Monarch: Baudouin
- Deputy: Guy Mathot; Willy Claes; José Desmarets
- Preceded by: Wilfried Martens
- Succeeded by: Wilfried Martens

Minister of Foreign Affairs
- In office 1989–1992
- Prime Minister: Wilfried Martens
- Preceded by: Leo Tindemans
- Succeeded by: Willy Claes

Minister of Finance
- In office 1985–1988
- Prime Minister: Wilfried Martens
- Preceded by: Frans Grootjans
- Succeeded by: Philippe Maystadt
- In office 1980–1981
- Prime Minister: Wilfried Martens
- Preceded by: Paul Hatry
- Succeeded by: Robert Vandeputte

Minister of Economic Affairs
- In office 1981–1985
- Prime Minister: Wilfried Martens
- Preceded by: Willy Claes
- Succeeded by: Philippe Maystadt

Personal details
- Born: 29 April 1933 (age 93) Leuven, Belgium
- Party: Christian Democratic and Flemish
- Spouse: Anne Rutsaert
- Education: Catholic University of Leuven; Columbia University

Marc Maria Frans, Viscount Eyskens (born 29 April 1933), known as Mark Eyskens, is a Belgian economist, professor and politician in the Christian People's Party, now called Christian Democratic and Flemish, and briefly served as the prime minister of Belgium in 1981.

== Early life ==
Eyskens was born in Leuven, the son of Gaston Eyskens, and lived for a time at the International House of New York. When Germany invaded Belgium, Eyskens and his mother fled to France but upon the Belgian capitulation, the family returned to Leuven.

== Academic career ==
In 1953, Eyskens attained a bachelor's degree in philosophy. In 1956, he became a doctor juris at the University of Leuven. In 1957, he obtained a master of arts in economics at Columbia University. In 1962, he received a doctorate in economic sciences. In 1962, he became a professor at the University of Leuven (1962–1998). From 1971 to 1976, he was chairman of the university. He was a member of the Club of Rome (1972–1978). In 2004, he was chairman of the Royal Flemish Academy of Belgium for Science and the Arts.

== Political career ==
In 1962, Eyskens started his political career as a counsellor in the cabinet of the Minister of Finance André Dequae.

In 1976, Eyskens became Secretary of State for Town and Country Planning and Housing (1976–1977, Tindemans I). Eyskens was first elected to the Belgian Chamber of Representatives in 1977. He was re-elected (elections of 1977, 1981, 1985, 1987, 1991, 1978, 1995, 1999) and served until 2003.

He became Secretary of State for the budget and Flemish affairs (1977–1979, Tindemans II & Vanden Boeynants II), Minister of Development Aid (1979–1980, Martens I, Martens II & Martens III) and Minister of Finance (1980–1981, Martens IV). Eyskens became the 45th Prime Minister of Belgium on 6 April 1981, an office his father had held six times. His government quickly collapsed on 17 December, due to disagreements on the financing of the Walloon steel industry. After the fall of his government he served as Minister for Economical Affairs (1981–1985, Martens V) and Minister of Finance (1985–1988, Martens VI & Martens VII).

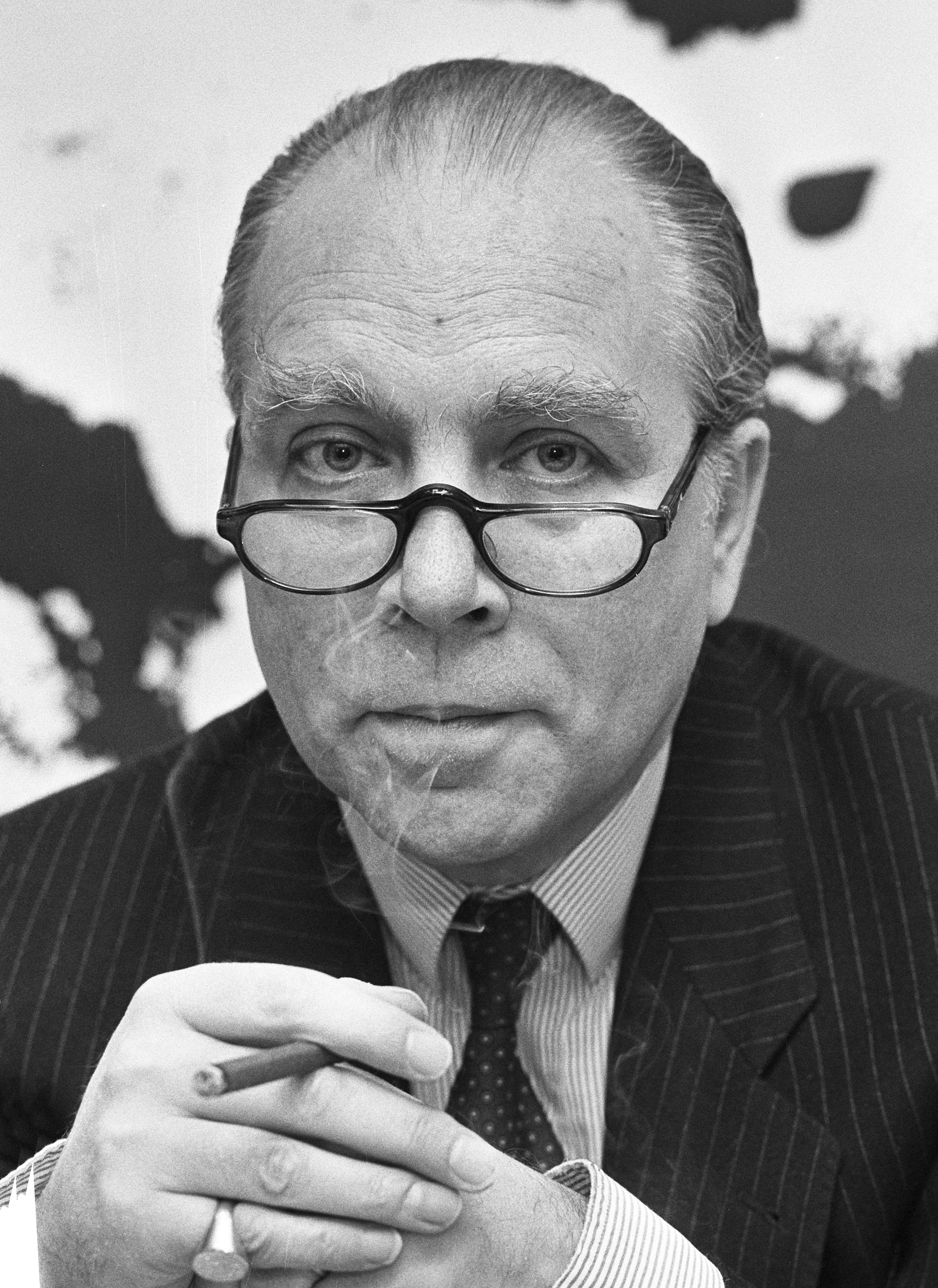
Mark Eyskens in 1986

Although originally not a member of the Martens VIII cabinet, on 19 June 1989 he re-entered the government when he replaced Leo Tindemans as Minister of Foreign Affairs (1989–1992, Martens VIII & Martens IX). This was the last government office he held. He served as a backbencher 1992–2003 and retired at the 2003 general election.

== Later career ==
On 18 November 1998, Eyskens was made a Minister of State. In the 2006 provincial elections Eyskens was elected to the provincial council of Flemish Brabant. He served from 2007 until his resignation in 2009.

Eyskens is a member of the Advisory Board of the Global Panel Foundation, a member of the Advisory Board of the Itinera Institute think-tank and as Honorary President of the Olivaint Conference of Belgium.

Political offices
Preceded by Paul Hatry	Minister of Finance; 1980–1981	Succeeded by Robert Vandeputte
Preceded by Wilfried Martens	Prime Minister of Belgium; 1981	Succeeded by Wilfried Martens
Preceded by Willy Claes	Minister of Economic Affairs; 1981–1985	Succeeded by Philippe Maystadt
Preceded by Frans Grootjans	Minister of Finance; 1985–1988	Succeeded by Philippe Maystadt
Preceded by Leo Tindemans	Minister of Foreign Affairs; 1989–1992	Succeeded by Willy Claes
