= 1984 European Parliament election in Belgium =

- 17 June 1984

24 seats to the European Parliament
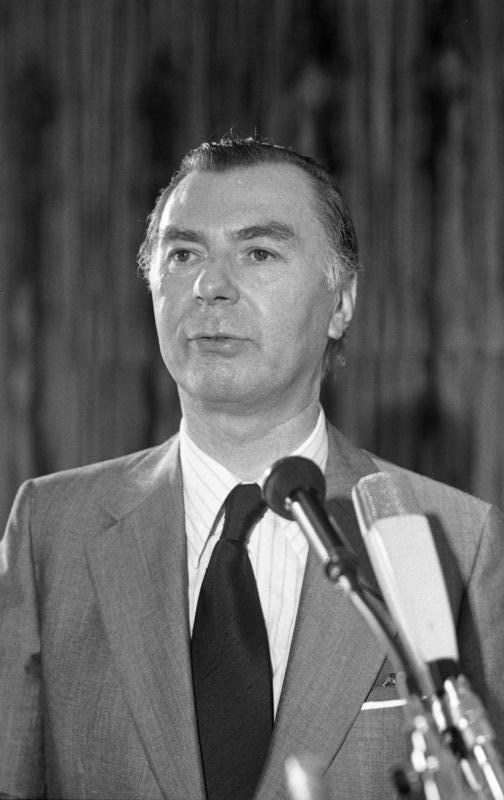

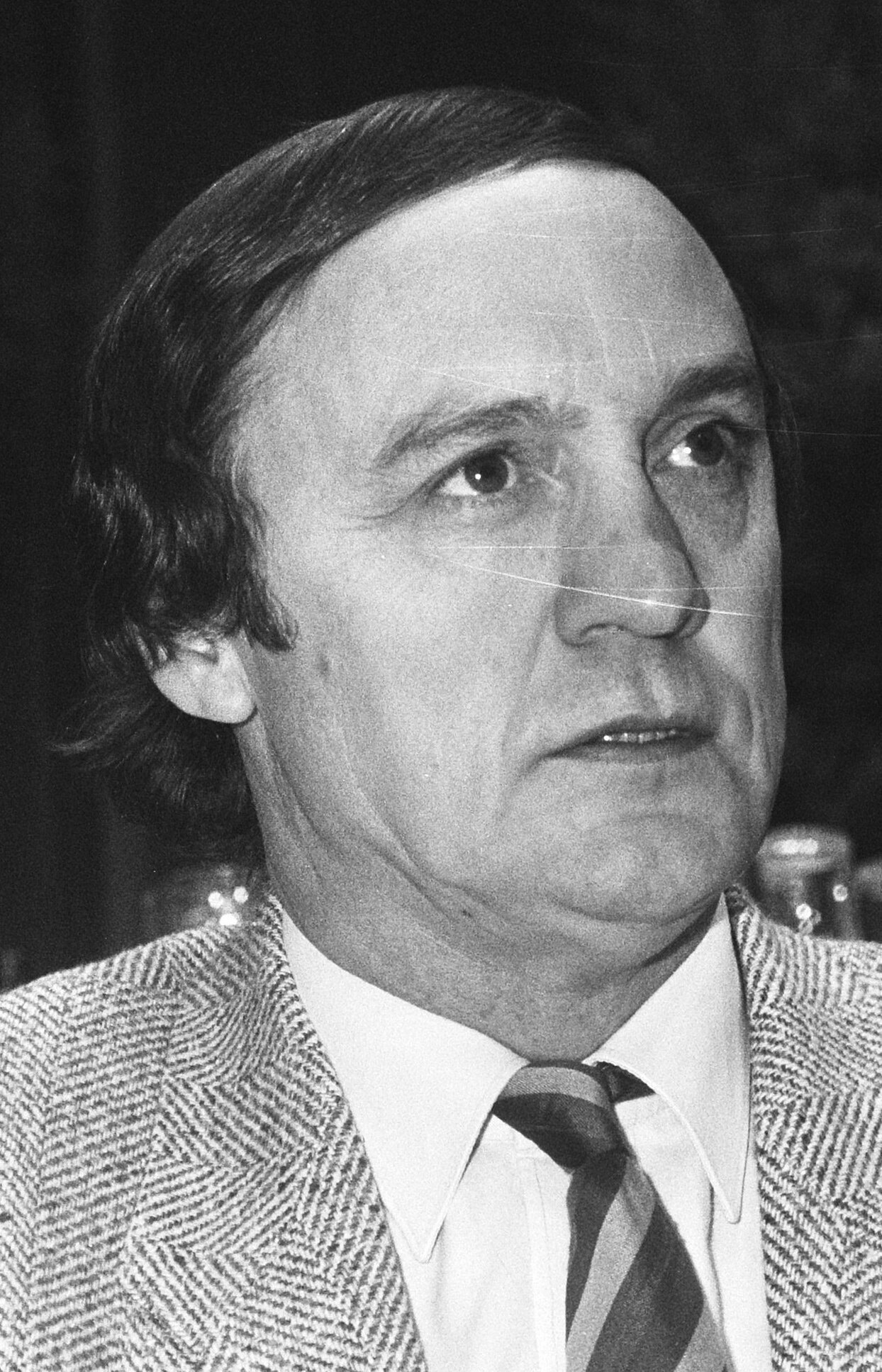

	First party	Second party
Leader	Leo Tindemans	Karel Van Miert
Party	CVP	SP
Alliance	EPP	PES
Last election	7 seats, 29.54%	3 seats, 12.84%
Seats won	4	4
Seat change	▼3	▲1
Popular vote	1,132,682	979,702
Percentage	19.80%	17.12%
Swing	▼9.74%	▲4.28%
	Third party	Fourth party
Leader	Ernest Glinne	Daniel Ducarme
Party	PS	PRL
Alliance	PES	ALDE
Last election	4 seats, 10.58%	2 seats, 6.85%
Seats won	5	3
Seat change	▲1	▲1
Popular vote	762,293	540,610
Percentage	13.32%	9.54%
Swing	▲2.74%	▲2.69%

Elections to the European Parliament were held in Belgium on 17 June 1984. The Dutch-speaking electoral college elected 13 MEPs and the French-speaking electoral college elected 11 MEPs.

== Results ==
Party	Votes	%	Seats
French-speaking electoral college
Socialist Party	762,293	34.04	5
Liberal Reformist Party	540,610	24.14	3
Christian Social Party	436,108	19.47	2
Ecolo	220,663	9.85	1
Democratic Front of Francophones-CFE	142,879	6.38	0
Communist Party of Belgium	61,605	2.75	0
Walloon Presence in Europe (RW–RPW–FIW)	51,903	2.32	0
Workers' Party of Belgium	13,082	0.58	0
Socialist Worker's Party–Revolutionary Workers' League	10,471	0.47	0
Total	2,239,614	100.00	11
Dutch-speaking electoral college
Christian People's Party	1,132,682	32.53	4
Flemish Socialist Party	979,702	28.13	4
Party for Freedom and Progress	494,277	14.19	2
People's Union	484,494	13.91	2
Agalev	246,712	7.08	1
Flemish Block	73,174	2.10	0
Workers' Party of Belgium	30,555	0.88	0
Communist Party of Belgium	25,774	0.74	0
Socialist Worker's Party–Revolutionary Workers' League	14,910	0.43	0
Total	3,482,280	100.00	13
Valid votes	5,721,894	89.07	
Invalid/blank votes	702,274	10.93	
Total votes	6,424,168	100.00	
Registered voters/turnout	6,975,855	92.09	
Source: Belgian Elections
