= 1985 Belgian general election =

← 1981	13 October 1985	1987 →

212 seats in the Chamber of Representatives
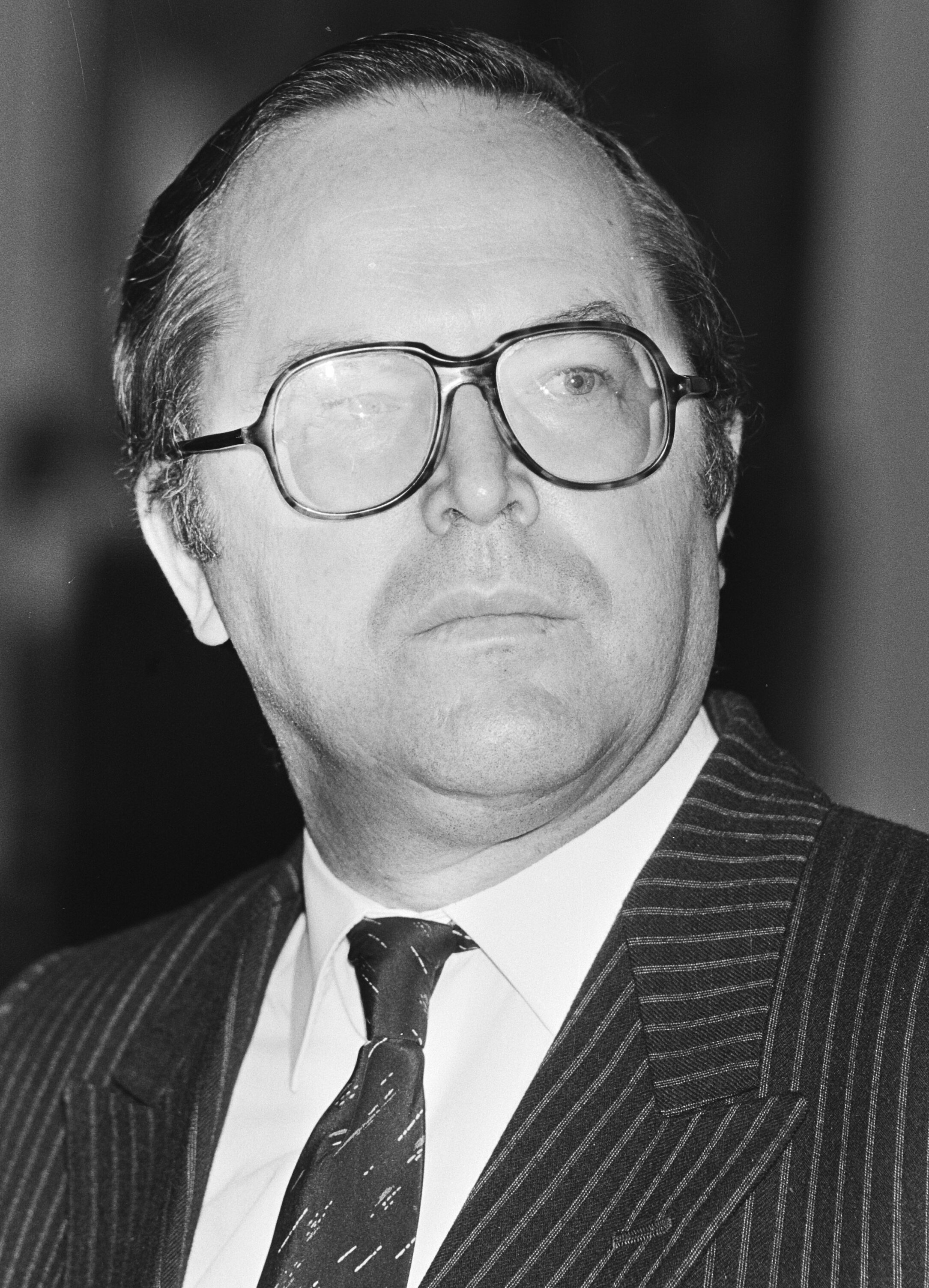

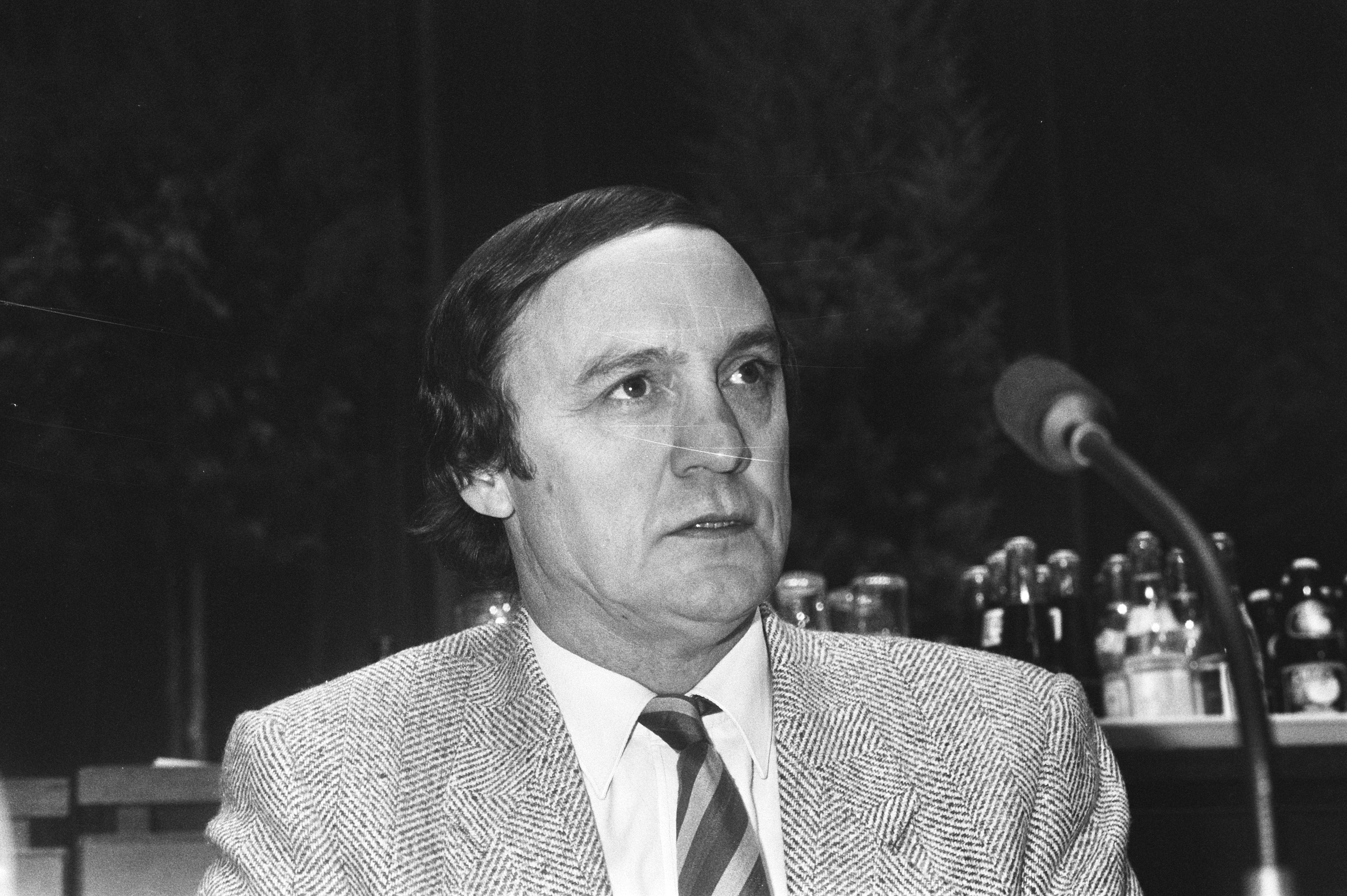

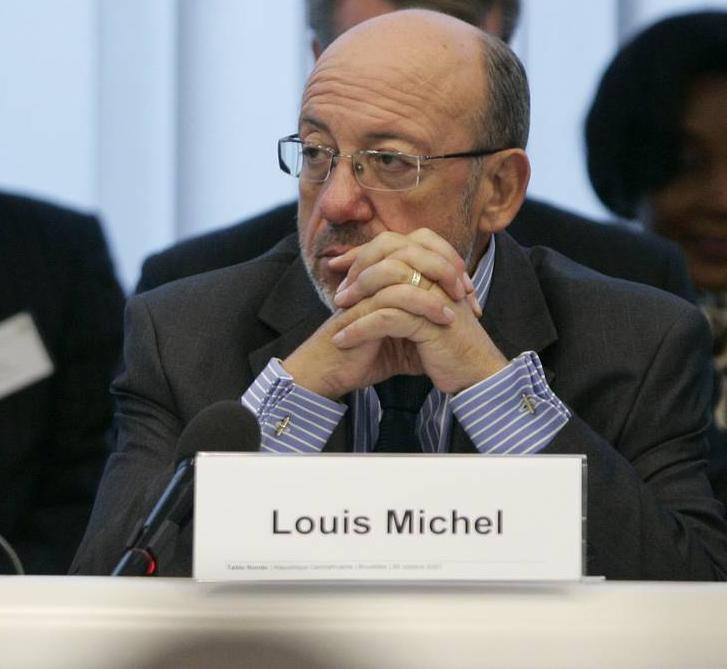

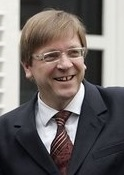

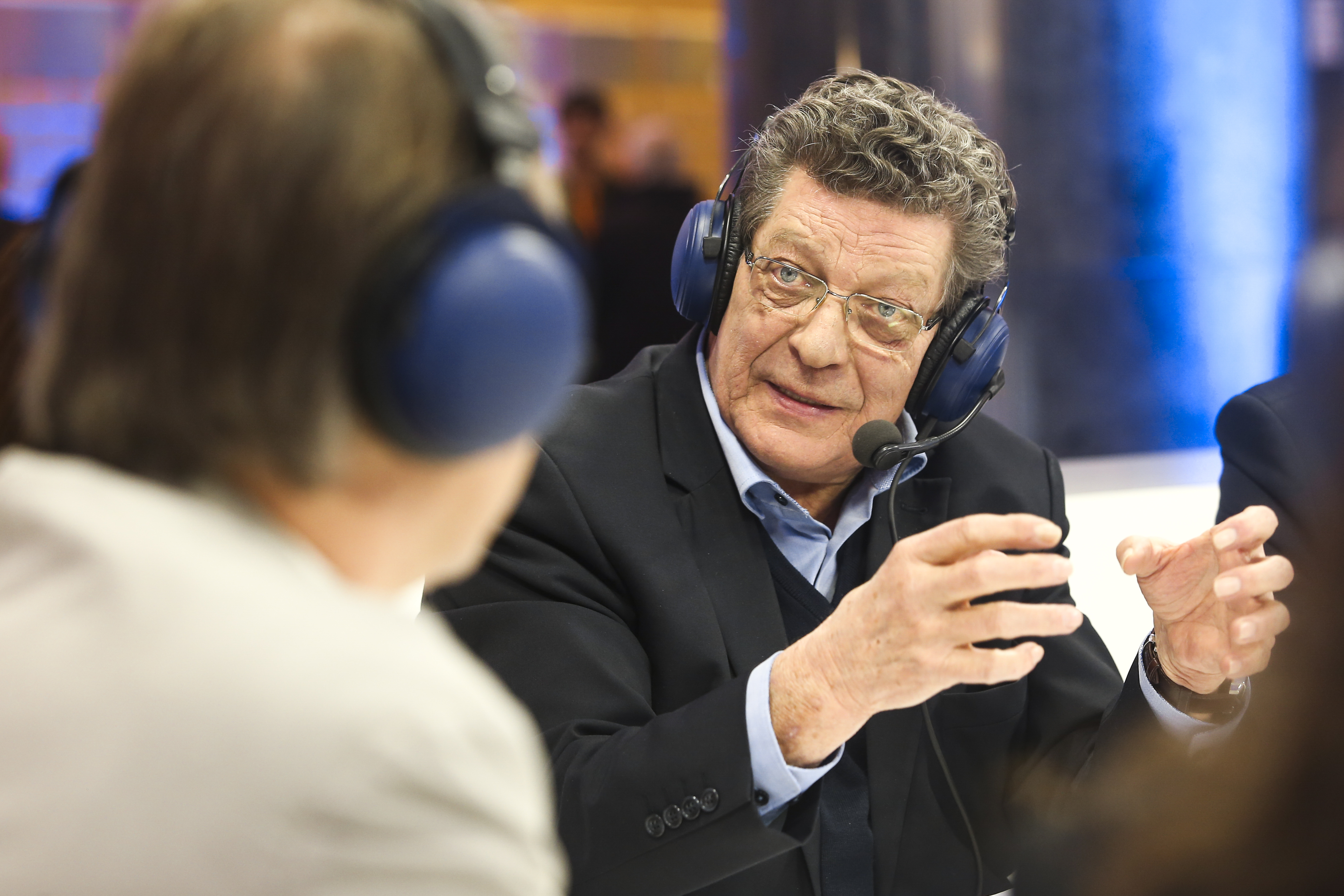
	First party	Second party	Third party
		PS
Leader	Wilfried Martens	Guy Spitaels	Karel Van Miert
Party	CVP	PS	sp.a
Leader since	Candidate for PM	1981	1978
Last election	43 seats, 19.34%	35 seats, 12.17%	26 seats, 12.36%
Seats won	49	35	32
Seat change	▲6	Steady	▲6
Popular vote	1,291,244	834,488	882,200
Percentage	21.29%	13.76%	14.55%
Swing	▲1.95%	▲1.59%	▲2.19%
	Fourth party	Fifth party	Sixth party
Leader	Louis Michel	Guy Verhofstadt	Gérard Deprez
Party	PRL	Open Vld	cdH
Leader since	1982	1982	1981
Last election	24 seats, 7.97%	28 seats, 12.89%	18 seats, 6.49%
Seats won	24	22	20
Seat change	Steady	▼6	▲2
Popular vote	619,390	651,806	482,254
Percentage	10.21%	10.75%	7.95%
Swing	▲2.24%	▼2.14%	▲1.50%
Government before election
Martens V
CVP-PSC-PVV-PRL
Government after election
Martens VI
CVP-PSC-PVV-PRL

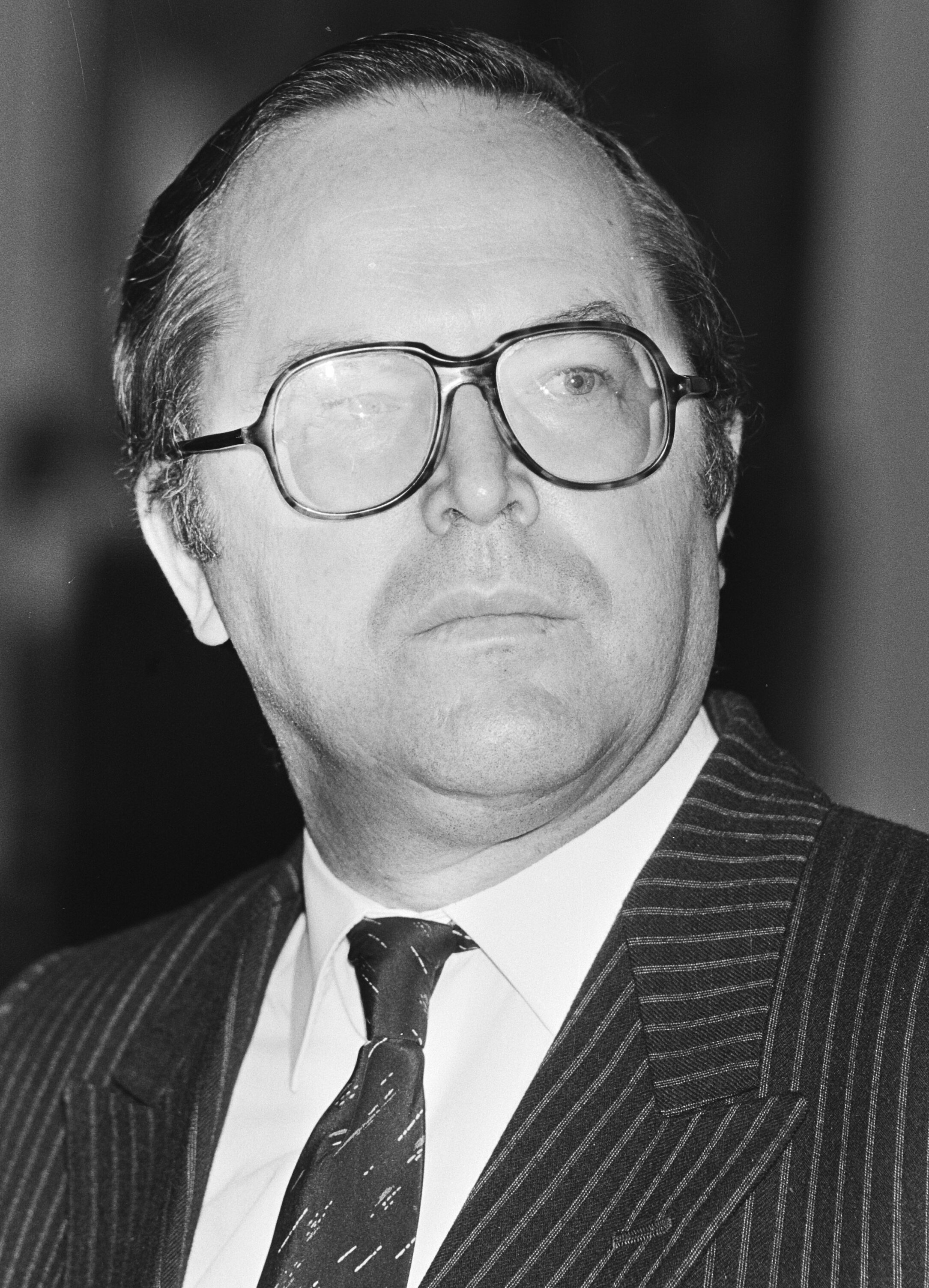
Prime Minister Martens

General elections were held in Belgium on 13 October 1985. The Christian People's Party emerged as the largest party, with 49 of the 212 seats in the Chamber of Representatives and 25 of the 106 seats in the Senate. Elections to the nine provincial councils were also held.

The incumbent government was a coalition of Christian democrats (CVP/PSC) and liberals (PVV/PRL) led by Prime Minister Wilfried Martens. Following the elections, the same parties formed a new Martens Government. Guy Verhofstadt, PVV leader since 1982, was elected for the first time as representative. Despite PVV being the only governing party to lose seats, he was able to weigh on the government agreement and he became Deputy Prime Minister in the Martens VI Government. The government would fall two years later due to the Voeren issue; distrust of labour unions in Verhofstadt proved to be a factor as well.

== Results ==
=== Chamber of Representatives ===
Party	Votes	%	Seats	+/–
Christian People's Party	1,291,244	21.29	49	+6
Socialistische Partij	882,200	14.55	32	+6
Parti Socialiste	834,488	13.76	35	0
Party for Freedom and Progress	651,806	10.75	22	–6
Liberal Reformist Party	619,390	10.21	24	0
Social Christian Party (PSC)	482,254	7.95	20	+2
People's Union	477,755	7.88	16	–4
Agalev	226,758	3.74	4	+2
Ecolo	152,483	2.51	5	+3
Vlaams Blok	85,391	1.41	1	0
Democratic Front of Francophones	72,361	1.19	3	–
Communist Party of Belgium	71,695	1.18	0	–2
Democratic Union for the Respect of Labour	69,707	1.15	1	–2
Workers' Party of Belgium	46,034	0.76	0	0
Solidarity and Participation	31,983	0.53	0	New
Socialist Workers' Party	13,681	0.23	0	0
Green	9,719	0.16	0	New
Walloon Party	9,284	0.15	0	New
Organic Front for the Cultural Renewal of Solidarist Europe	8,221	0.14	0	New
Union for a New Democracy	6,609	0.11	0	New
Party of German-speaking Belgians	5,228	0.09	0	0
National Front	3,738	0.06	0	New
Christian Liberal Party	3,442	0.06	0	New
Parti Communautaire National-Européen	1,763	0.03	0	New
Zo Maar	1,630	0.03	0	New
United Feminist Party	1,201	0.02	0	0
Union of Progressive Walloons	828	0.01	0	New
Flemish People's Party	678	0.01	0	New
Charlier	655	0.01	0	New
GIOT	640	0.01	0	New
Humanist Party	518	0.01	0	New
Appeal to All	464	0.01	0	New
SDU–USD	412	0.01	0	New
Total	6,064,260	100.00	212	0
Valid votes	6,064,260	92.55		
Invalid/blank votes	487,974	7.45		
Total votes	6,552,234	100.00		
Registered voters/turnout	7,001,297	93.59		
Source: Belgian Elections

=== Senate ===
Party	Votes	%	Seats	+/–
Christian People's Party	1,260,113	21.02	25	+3
Socialistische Partij	868,624	14.49	16	+3
Parti Socialiste	832,792	13.89	18	0
Party for Freedom and Progress	637,776	10.64	11	–3
Liberal Reformist Party	588,373	9.82	13	+2
People's Union	484,996	8.09	8	–2
Social Christian Party	475,119	7.93	10	+2
Agalev	229,206	3.82	2	+1
Ecolo	163,361	2.73	2	–1
Vlaams Blok	90,120	1.50	0	0
Democratic Union for the Respect of Labour	73,045	1.22	0	–1
Communist Party of Belgium	71,020	1.18	0	–1
Democratic Front of Francophones	70,239	1.17	1	–
Workers' Party of Belgium	44,799	0.75	0	0
Solidarity and Participation	33,554	0.56	0	New
Socialist Workers' Party	16,786	0.28	0	0
Green	10,988	0.18	0	New
Walloon Party	10,539	0.18	0	New
Organic Front for the Cultural Renewal of Solidarist Europe	9,318	0.16	0	New
Union for a New Democracy	7,200	0.12	0	New
Party of German-speaking Belgians	5,364	0.09	0	New
National Front	4,201	0.07	0	New
Christian Liberal Party	3,267	0.05	0	New
United Feminist Party	1,430	0.02	0	0
Parti Communautaire National-Européen	1,312	0.02	0	New
Flemish People's Party	446	0.01	0	New
Paix	443	0.01	0	0
Total	5,994,431	100.00	106	0
Valid votes	5,994,431	91.48		
Invalid/blank votes	558,259	8.52		
Total votes	6,552,690	100.00		
Registered voters/turnout	7,001,297	93.59		
Source: Belgian Elections
