= 1989 European Parliament election in Belgium =

- 18 June 1989

24 seats to the European Parliament
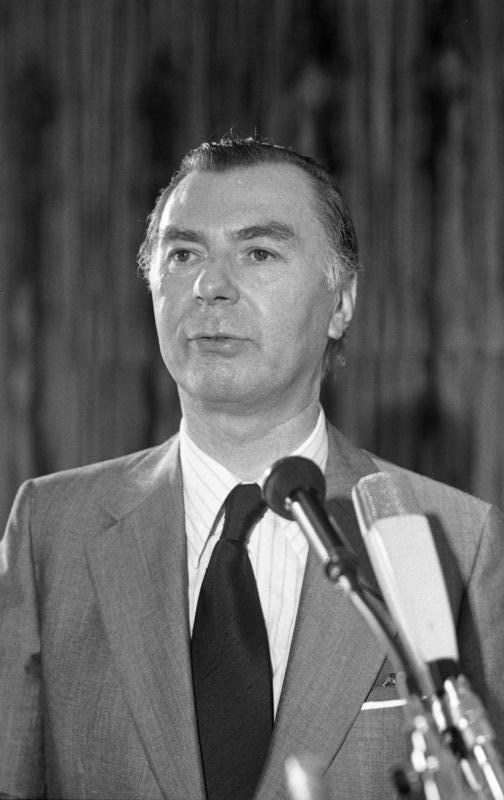

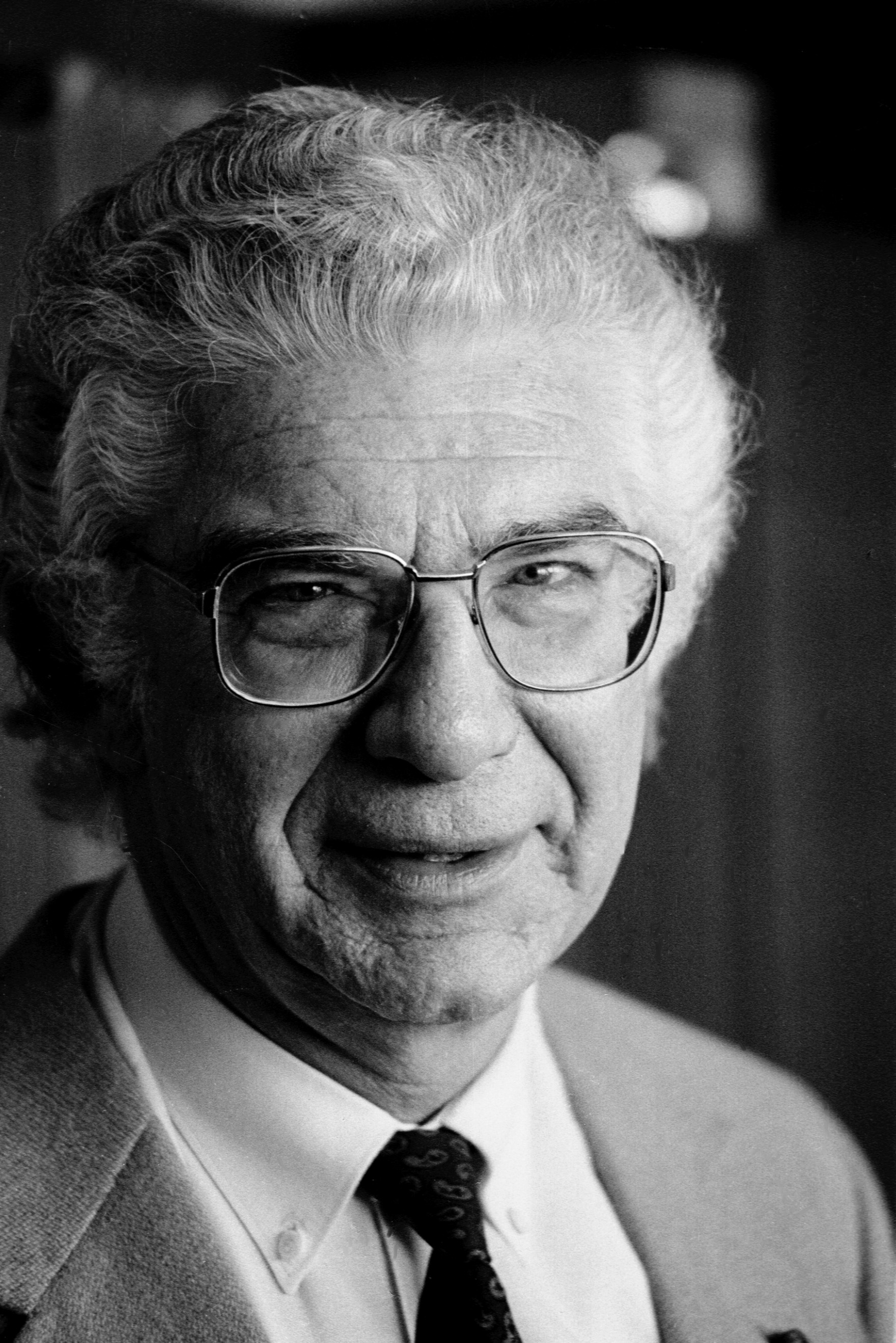
	First party	Second party
Leader	Leo Tindemans	Ernest Glinne
Party	CVP	PS
Alliance	EPP	PES
Last election	4 seats, 19.80%	5 seats, 13.32%
Seats won	5	5
Seat change	▲1	Steady
Popular vote	1,247,075	854,207
Percentage	21.14%	14.48%
Swing	▲1.34%	▲1.16%
	Third party	Fourth party
Leader	Marc Galle	Willy De Clercq
Party	Flemish Socialist Party	PVV-PLP
Alliance	PES	ALDE
Last election	4 seats, 17.12%	2 seats, 10.60%
Seats won	3	3
Seat change	▼1	▲1
Popular vote	733,242	678,421
Percentage	12.43%	11.37%
Swing	▼4.69%	▲0.77%

Elections to the European Parliament were held in Belgium on 18 June 1989. The Dutch-speaking electoral college elected 13 MEPs and the French-speaking electoral college elected 11 MEPs.

The first election to the newly established Brussels Regional Council was held on the same day.

== Results ==
Party	Votes	%	Seats
French-speaking electoral college
Socialist Party	854,207	38.13	5
Christian Social Party	476,795	21.28	2
Liberal Reformist Party	423,479	18.90	2
Ecolo	371,053	16.56	2
Democratic Front of Francophones	85,867	3.83	0
Socialist Workers' Party	10,117	0.45	0
Workers' Party of Belgium	9,031	0.40	0
List for Europe, Workers and Democracy	5,503	0.25	0
Humanist Party	4,342	0.19	0
Total	2,240,394	100.00	11
Dutch-speaking electoral college
Christian People's Party	1,247,075	34.08	5
Flemish Socialist Party	733,242	20.04	3
Party for Freedom and Progress	625,561	17.10	2
Agalev	446,539	12.20	1
People's Union-European Free Alliance	318,153	8.70	1
Vlaams Blok	241,117	6.59	1
Rainbow	26,472	0.72	0
Workers' Party of Belgium	20,747	0.57	0
Total	3,658,906	100.00	13
Valid votes	5,899,300	91.62	
Invalid/blank votes	539,438	8.38	
Total votes	6,438,738	100.00	
Registered voters/turnout	7,096,273	90.73	
Source: Belgian Elections
