= DéFI =

- Abbreviation: DéFI
- President: Sophie Rohonyi
- Founded: 11 May 1964 (62 years ago)
- Headquarters: Chaussée de Charleroi 127; 1060 Brussels
- Ideology: Federalism (Belgian); Liberalism (Belgian); Regionalism; Social liberalism
- Political position: Centre to centre-left
- Colours: Amaranth
- Chamber of Representatives (French-speaking seats): 1 / 61
- Senate (French-speaking seats): 0 / 24
- Walloon Parliament: 0 / 75
- Parliament of the French Community: 0 / 94
- Brussels Parliament (French-speaking seats): 4 / 72
- European Parliament (French-speaking seats): 0 / 8

Website
- defi.be

DéFI (Note: French pronunciation: [defi] ("challenge"), a backronym of Démocrate, Fédéraliste, Indépendant ([demɔkʁat fedeʁalist ɛ̃depɑ̃dɑ̃], lit. 'Democratic, Federalist, Independent')) is a regionalist and social-liberal political party in Belgium mainly known for defending French-speakers' interests in and near the Brussels Capital Region. Founded in 1964, the party is led by Sophie Rohonyi, a former member of the Chamber of Representatives. The party adopted its current name, DéFI, in 2015.

== History ==
The party was founded as the Democratic Front of Francophones (Front Démocratique des Francophones, FDF) on 11 May 1964 as a response to the language laws of 1962. The party had instant success in Brussels: it first contested parliamentary elections one year later, where it won one senator and 3 seats in the Chamber of Representatives for the constituency of Brussels. Its number of seats increased further in the subsequent parliamentary elections. The party also dominated Brussels' municipal politics until 1982. Antoinette Spaak became the first woman to lead a Belgian political party when she was elected to lead the FDF in 1977.

Initially the party cooperated with the Walloon Rally. From 1977 until 1980, the FDF participated in the federal governments led by Leo Tindemans and subsequently Wilfried Martens. From 1992, the FDF regularly competed in electoral alliance with the larger Liberal Reformist Party (PRL). In 2002 the PRL, the FDF, the MCC and the PFF formed the Reformist Movement (MR), a closer alliance of Francophone liberal parties.

In January 2010 the party name was amended to Francophone Democratic Federalists (Fédéralistes Démocrates Francophones), maintaining its original acronym. In September 2011, the FDF decided to leave the alliance over disagreements with MR president Charles Michel on the agreement concerning the splitting of the Brussels-Halle-Vilvoorde district during the 2010–2011 Belgian government formation.

The party adopted its current name, DéFI, in November 2015.

== Ideology and policies ==
The party advocates the extension of the bilingual status of Brussels to some municipalities in the Brussels Periphery (in Flemish Brabant, Flemish Region), where a majority of the population has become French-speaking in recent years, but whose official language remains Dutch. The party advocates for the right to use French rather than Dutch when dealing with local authorities in Flanders. This demand is rejected by Flemish parties, who say that French-speaking residents of the Flemish Region should learn Dutch and argue that the Francization of Brussels should not be allowed to expand into Flanders.

=== Electoral positioning ===
During the 2019 election campaign, the RePresent research centre — composed of political scientists from five universities (UAntwerpen, KU Leuven, VUB, UCLouvain and ULB) — studied the electoral programmes of Belgium's thirteen main political parties. This study classified the parties on two "left-right" axes, from "-5" (extreme left) to "5" (extreme right): a "classic" socio-economic axis, which refers to state intervention in the economic process and the degree to which the state should ensure social equality, and a socio-cultural axis, which refers to a divide articulated around an identity-based opposition on themes such as immigration, Europe, crime, the environment, emancipation, etc.

DéFI then presented a centrist programme (−0.47) on the socio-economic level, and left-wing (−2.46) on the socio-cultural level.

The RePresent centre repeated the exercise during the 2024 election campaign for the twelve main parties. DéFI's positioning shifted to the centre-left on the socio-economic axis (−1.67) and slightly more towards the centre, but still on the left, on the socio-cultural axis (−2.12).

== Representation ==
Notable elected members include:

- Véronique Caprasse, member of the Chamber of Representatives for Brussels and former mayor of Kraainem (2013–2015)
- Bernard Clerfayt, mayor of Schaerbeek since 2000 and member of the Brussels Parliament
- Didier Gosuin, Minister in the Vervoort II Brussels Government (2014–2019) and mayor of Auderghem
- Cécile Jodogne, Secretary of State in the Vervoort II Brussels Government (2014–2019)
- Olivier Maingain, former party leader, member of the Chamber of Representatives for Brussels since 1991 and mayor of Woluwe-Saint-Lambert since 2006

== Election results ==
=== Chamber of Representatives ===
Election	Leader	Votes	%	Seats	+/−	Government
1965	Paul Brien	68,966	1.33	3 / 212	New	Opposition
1968	Albert Peeters	154,023	2.97	6 / 212	▲3	Opposition
1971 (Note: Run in a joint list with RW.)	Albert Peeters	286,639	5.43	8 / 212	▲2	Opposition
1974 (Note: Run in a joint list with PDLP.)	André Lagasse	301,303	5.73	12 / 212	▲4	Opposition
1977	Léon Defosset	263,104	4.72	11 / 212	▼1	Opposition (1977–1978)
1977	Léon Defosset	263,104	4.72	11 / 212	▼1	Coalition (1978)
1978	Antoinette Spaak	259,019	4.68	11 / 212	0	Coalition (1978–1980)
1978	Antoinette Spaak	259,019	4.68	11 / 212	0	Opposition (1980–1981)
1981	Antoinette Spaak	253,720	4.21	6 / 212	▼5	Opposition
1985	Georges Clerfayt	72,361	1.19	3 / 212	▼3	Opposition
1987	Georges Clerfayt	71,338	1.16	3 / 212	0	Opposition
1991 (Note: Run in a joint list with PPW.)	Georges Clerfayt	90,813	1.47	3 / 212	0	Opposition
1995 (Note: Run in a joint list with PRL.)	Olivier Maingain	623,250	10.26	2 / 150	▼1	Opposition
1999	Olivier Maingain	630,219	10.14	2 / 150	0	Coalition
2003	Merged into Reformist Movement					
2007	Merged into Reformist Movement					
2010	Merged into Reformist Movement					
2014	Olivier Maingain	121,384	1.80	2 / 150	▲2	Opposition
2019	Olivier Maingain	150,394	2.22	2 / 150	0	Opposition
2024	François De Smet	84,024	1.20	1 / 150	▼2	Opposition

=== European Parliament ===
Election	List leader	Votes	%		Seats	+/−	EP Group
Election	List leader	Votes	F.E.C.	Overall	Seats	+/−	EP Group
1979 (Note: Run in a joint list with RW.)	Antoinette Spaak	414,603	19.75 (#3)	7.62	2 / 24	New	NI
1984 (Note: Run in a joint list with FNFP.)	Unclear	142,879	6.38 (#5)	2.50	0 / 24	▼2	−
1989	François Roelants du Vivier	85,867	3.83 (#5)	1.46	0 / 24	0	−
1994 (Note: Run in a joint list with PRL.)	Jean Gol	541,724	24.25 (#2)	9.08	1 / 25	▲1	ELDR
1999	Daniel Ducarme	624,445	26.99 (#1)	10.03	1 / 25	0	ELDR
2004	Merged into Reformist Movement						
2009	Merged into Reformist Movement						
2014	Cristina Coteanu	82,540	3.38 (#6)	1.23	0 / 21	0	−
2019	Benoit Cassart	144,555	5.92 (#6)	2.15	0 / 21	0	−
2024	Fabrice Van Dorpe	75,243	2.91 (#6)	1.05	0 / 22	0	−

== See also ==
- Belgian French
- French Community of Belgium
- Languages of Belgium

== Bibliography ==
- Kesteloot, Chantal (2004). Au nom de la Wallonie et de Bruxelles français : les origines du FDF. Brussels: Complexe. ISBN 2870279876.
