= 1987 Belgian general election =

← 1985	13 December 1987	1991 →
- Chamber of Representatives
- All 212 seats in the Chamber of Representatives
- Turnout: 93.37%
Party	Leader	Vote %	Seats	+/–
CVP	Wilfried Martens	19.45	43	−6
Socialiste	Guy Spitaels	15.64	40	+5
Socialistische	Karel Van Miert	14.90	32	0
PVV-PLP	Annemie Neyts-Uyttebroeck	11.55	25	+3
PRL	Louis Michel	9.41	23	−1
People's Union	Jaak Gabriëls	8.06	16	0
PSC	Gérard Deprez	8.00	19	−1
Agalev	Leo Cox	4.48	6	+2
Ecolo		2.57	3	−2
Vlaams Blok	Karel Dillen	1.90	2	+2
FDF	Georges Clerfayt	1.16	3	0
This lists parties that won seats. See the complete results below.
- Senate
- All 106 seats in the Senate
- Turnout: 93.39%
Party	Vote %	Seats	+/–
CVP	19.19	22	−3
Socialiste	15.74	20	+2
Socialistische	14.71	17	+1
PVV-PLP	11.27	11	0
PRL	9.26	12	−1
People's Union	8.12	8	0
PSC	7.79	9	−1
Agalev	4.91	3	+1
Ecolo	2.77	2	0
Vlaams Blok	2.02	1	+1
FDF	1.27	1	0
This lists parties that won seats. See the complete results below.

Government before	Government after election
Martens VII; CVP-PSC-PVV-PRL	Martens VII; CVP-PSC-PVV-PRL

General elections were held in Belgium on 13 December 1987 to elect members of the Chamber of Representatives and Senate. Elections to the nine provincial councils were also held.

The snap elections were called after the government led by Wilfried Martens (CVP) fell due to the Voeren issue.

Following the election, the King appointed Jean-Luc Dehaene (CVP) as informateur; Dehaene famously replied "Sire, give me one hundred days." 106 days later a new government was formed, again led by CVP leader Wilfried Martens.

== Results ==
=== Chamber of Representatives ===
Party	Votes	%	Seats	+/–
Christian People's Party	1,195,363	19.45	43	–6
Parti Socialiste	961,361	15.64	40	+5
Socialistische Partij	915,432	14.90	32	0
Party for Freedom and Progress	709,758	11.55	25	+3
Liberal Reformist Party	577,959	9.41	23	–1
People's Union	495,120	8.06	16	0
Christian Social Party	491,908	8.00	19	–1
Agalev	275,437	4.48	6	+2
Ecolo	157,988	2.57	3	–2
Vlaams Blok	116,534	1.90	2	+2
Democratic Front of the Francophones	71,338	1.16	3	0
Communist Party of Belgium	51,046	0.83	0	0
Workers' Party of Belgium	45,218	0.74	0	0
Socialist Workers' Party	31,446	0.51	0	0
Walloon Rally	12,391	0.20	0	New
National Front	7,596	0.12	0	0
Democratic Union for the Respect of Labour	6,452	0.10	0	–1
Green	6,096	0.10	0	0
Party of German-speaking Belgians	5,683	0.09	0	0
Party of New Forces–PCN	5,053	0.08	0	0
Christian Liberal Party	4,136	0.07	0	0
United Feminist Party	959	0.02	0	0
Appeal to All European Social Libertarians	593	0.01	0	0
Green Party Radical	340	0.01	0	New
Total	6,145,207	100.00	212	0
Valid votes	6,145,207	93.43		
Invalid/blank votes	431,840	6.57		
Total votes	6,577,047	100.00		
Registered voters/turnout	7,044,211	93.37		
Source: Belgian Elections

=== Senate ===
Party	Votes	%	Seats	+/–
Christian People's Party	1,169,377	19.19	22	–3
Parti Socialiste	958,686	15.74	20	+2
Socialistische Partij	896,294	14.71	17	+1
Party for Freedom and Progress	686,440	11.27	11	0
Liberal Reformist Party	564,367	9.26	12	–1
People's Union	494,410	8.12	8	0
Christian Social Party	474,370	7.79	9	–1
Agalev	299,049	4.91	3	+1
Ecolo	168,491	2.77	2	0
Vlaams Blok	122,953	2.02	1	+1
Democratic Front of the Francophones	77,522	1.27	1	0
Communist Party of Belgium	52,318	0.86	0	0
Workers' Party of Belgium	43,386	0.71	0	0
Socialist Workers' Party	32,187	0.53	0	0
Walloon Rally	14,333	0.24	0	New
Green	7,648	0.13	0	0
Democratic Union for the Respect of Labour	6,203	0.10	0	0
Parti Communautaire National-Européen	5,614	0.09	0	0
Party of German-speaking Belgians	5,588	0.09	0	0
Christian Liberal Party	3,144	0.05	0	0
United Feminist Party	1,127	0.02	0	0
Union of Progressive Walloons–Christian Liberal Party	475	0.01	0	New
Other parties	8,186	0.13	0	–
Total	6,092,168	100.00	106	0
Valid votes	6,092,168	92.61		
Invalid/blank votes	486,076	7.39		
Total votes	6,578,244	100.00		
Registered voters/turnout	7,044,211	93.39		
Source: Belgian Elections
