= List of members of the Council of the German Cultural Community, 1981–1986 =

This is a list of members of the Belgian Council of the German Cultural Community between 1981 and 1986, following the direct elections of 1981.

In 1984, the German Cultural Community became the German-speaking Community, with more autonomy, including its own government.

== Composition ==
Party	Seats	+/–
Christian Social Party (Christlich Soziale Partei, CSP)	9	▼2
Party of German-speaking Belgians (Partei der Deutschsprachigen Belgier, PDB)	7	0
Party for Freedom and Progress (Partei für Freiheit und Fortschritt, PFF)	6	▲2
Parti Socialiste (Sozialistische Partei, SP)	3	0
	25	

== Sources ==
- "Members of the DG Parliament". The Parliament of the German-speaking Community. Archived from the original on 2012-04-15.
