= 1991 Belgian general election =

← 1987	24 November 1991	1995 →
- Chamber of Representatives
- All 212 seats in the Chamber of Representatives
- Turnout: 92.72%
Party	Leader	Vote %	Seats	+/–
CVP	Wilfried Martens	16.81	39	−4
Socialiste	Guy Spitaels	13.49	35	−5
PVV-PLP	Guy Verhofstadt	11.98	26	+1
Socialistische	Frank Vandenbroucke	11.98	28	−4
PRL	Antoine Duquesne; Daniel Ducarme	8.14	20	−3
PSC	Gérard Deprez	7.74	18	−1
Vlaams Blok	Karel Dillen	6.58	12	+10
People's Union	Jaak Gabriëls	5.89	10	−6
Ecolo		5.07	10	+7
Agalev	Johan Malcorps	4.86	7	+1
ROSSEM	Jean-Pierre Van Rossem	3.23	3	New
FDF	Georges Clerfayt	1.47	3	0
National Front	Daniel Féret	1.05	1	+1
This lists parties that won seats. See the complete results below.
- Senate
- All 70 seats in the Senate
- Turnout: 92.72%
Party	Vote %	Seats	+/–
CVP	16.82	20	−2
Socialiste	13.31	18	+2
Socialistische	11.94	14	−3
PVV-PLP	11.66	13	+2
PRL	8.12	9	−3
PSC	7.91	9	0
Vlaams Blok	6.78	5	+4
People's Union	5.97	5	−3
Ecolo	5.29	6	+4
Agalev	5.14	5	+2
ROSSEM	3.22	1	New
FDF	1.41	1	0
This lists parties that won seats. See the complete results below.

Government before	Government after election
Martens IX; CVP-PSC-PS-SP	Martens IX; CVP-PSC-PS-SP

General elections were held in Belgium on 24 November 1991 to elect members of the Chamber of Representatives and Senate. The results represented a big loss for the majority parties (Christian democrats and Socialists) and significant gains for the Vlaams Blok. The day became known as "black Sunday" due to the rise of the far-right party.

These were the last elections before the new 1993 Belgian Constitution, which turned Belgium formally into a federal state: after this election, the number of MPs were reduced while the regional parliaments would become directly elected. The provincial elections would no longer coincide with national elections, but with municipal elections.

By law of 16 July 1991, experiments with electronic voting were carried out for the first time in Belgium during these elections, specifically in the canton of Verlaine (Liège Province) and the canton of Waarschoot (province of East Flanders).

== Results ==
=== Chamber of Representatives ===
Party	Votes	%	Seats	+/–
Christian People Party	1,036,165	16.81	39	–4
Parti Socialiste	831,199	13.49	35	–5
Party for Freedom and Progress	738,016	11.98	26	+1
Socialistische Partij	737,976	11.98	28	–4
Liberal Reformist Party	501,647	8.14	20	–3
Christian Social Party	476,730	7.74	18	–1
Vlaams Blok	405,247	6.58	12	+10
People's Union	363,124	5.89	10	–6
Ecolo	312,624	5.07	10	+7
Agalev	299,550	4.86	7	+1
ROSSEM	199,194	3.23	3	New
Democratic Front of the Francophones–Party for Wallonia	90,813	1.47	3	0
National Front	64,992	1.05	1	+1
Workers' Party of Belgium	30,491	0.49	0	0
Belgium–Europe–Belgium	15,429	0.25	0	New
Rainbow	11,944	0.19	0	New
Agir	11,189	0.18	0	New
Communist Party	5,706	0.09	0	New
Socialist Workers' Party	5,243	0.09	0	0
VD	4,467	0.07	0	New
Walloon Rally	3,756	0.06	0	0
VCD–PCS	2,941	0.05	0	New
Democratic Union for the Respect of Labour	2,416	0.04	0	0
Independent Alliance Two Thousand New Policy	2,413	0.04	0	New
Party of New Forces–PCN	1,870	0.03	0	0
Party for Christian Solidarity	1,769	0.03	0	New
DVA	1,139	0.02	0	New
FNBB	1,128	0.02	0	New
UCD	721	0.01	0	New
PLI–POL	709	0.01	0	New
NV	693	0.01	0	New
Solidarité nationale wallonne	491	0.01	0	New
SRD	368	0.01	0	New
Total	6,162,160	100.00	212	0
Valid votes	6,162,160	93.03		
Invalid/blank votes	461,827	6.97		
Total votes	6,623,987	100.00		
Registered voters/turnout	7,144,088	92.72		
Source: Belgian Elections

=== Senate ===
Party	Votes	%	Seats	+/–
Christian People Party	1,028,699	16.82	20	–2
Parti Socialiste	814,136	13.31	18	+2
Socialistische Partij	730,274	11.94	14	–3
Party for Freedom and Progress	713,542	11.66	13	+2
Liberal Reformist Party	496,562	8.12	9	–3
Christian Social Party	483,961	7.91	9	0
Vlaams Blok	414,481	6.78	5	+4
People's Union	365,173	5.97	5	–3
Ecolo	323,683	5.29	6	+4
Agalev	314,360	5.14	5	+2
ROSSEM	197,128	3.22	1	New
Democratic Front of the Francophones–Party for Wallonia	86,026	1.41	1	0
National Front	60,876	1.00	0	New
Workers' Party of Belgium	31,754	0.52	0	0
Belgium–Europe–Belgium	15,893	0.26	0	New
Rainbow	12,150	0.20	0	New
Communist Party	6,552	0.11	0	New
Socialist Workers' Party	6,485	0.11	0	0
VD	4,228	0.07	0	New
Walloon Rally	3,441	0.06	0	0
Party of New Forces–PCN	2,777	0.05	0	0
Democratic Union for the Respect of Labour	2,209	0.04	0	0
UCD	1,387	0.02	0	New
FNBB	1,197	0.02	0	New
NV	640	0.01	0	New
Total	6,117,614	100.00	106	0
Valid votes	6,117,614	92.34		
Invalid/blank votes	507,361	7.66		
Total votes	6,624,975	100.00		
Registered voters/turnout	7,144,888	92.72		
Source: Belgian Elections
