= List of members of the Council of the German-speaking Community, 1990–1995 =

This is a list of members of the Council of the German Cultural Community between 1990 and 1995, following the direct elections of 1990.

== Composition ==
Party	Seats	+/–
Christian Social Party (Christlich Soziale Partei, CSP)	8	▼2
Party for Freedom and Progress (Partei für Freiheit und Fortschritt, PFF)	5	0
Parti Socialiste (Sozialistische Partei, SP)	4	▲1
Party of German-speaking Belgians (Partei der Deutschsprachigen Belgier, PDB)	4	▼1
Ecolo (ECOLO)	4	▲3
Solidarity and Participation (Solidarité et Participation, SEP)	0	▼1
	25	

== Sources ==
- "Members of the DG Parliament". The Parliament of the German-speaking Community. Archived from the original on 2012-04-15.
