= Ligue communiste révolutionnaire =

Ligue communiste révolutionnaire may refer to:

- Revolutionary Communist League (France)
- Revolutionary Communist League (Belgium)
