= Rodos Palace =

Hotel complex in Rhodes, Greece

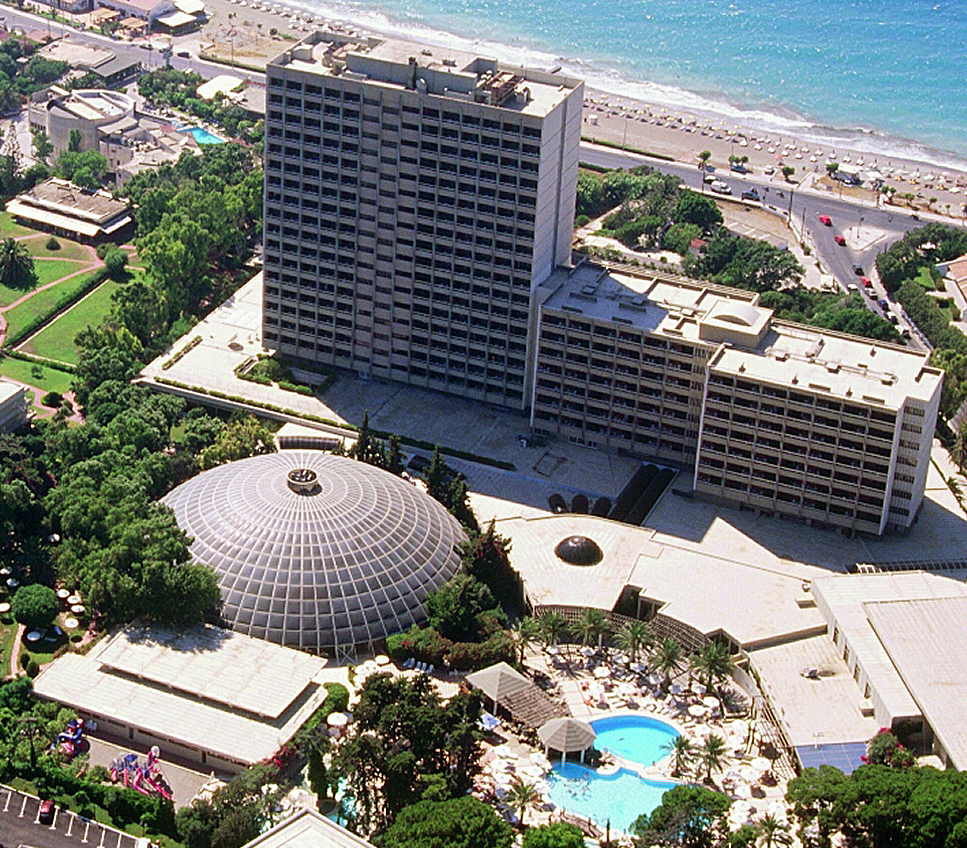
- Interactive map of the Rodos Palace area

General information
- Location: Rhodes, Greece
- Coordinates: 36°25′23″N 28°11′46″E
- Opening: 1974
- Owner: Rodos Palace Hotel S.A
- Management: Rodos Palace Hotel S.A

Technical details
- Floor count: 20

Design and construction
- Developer: Vassileios A. Cambourakis

Other information
- Number of rooms: 785
- Number of restaurants: 5

Website
- rodos-palace.gr

Rodos Palace is a five-star hotel and international convention center located on the island of Rhodes, Greece. It was opened in 1974.

== History ==
Rodos Palace was founded by hotelier Vassileios A. Cambourakis in 1974. The original complex included a 20-story tower and a dome which was constructed using NASA aeronautical materials. In 1977, the first gourmet restaurant of Greece was opened at the hotel.

In 1988, Rodos Palace hosted the European Council's summit, where eight heads of state and their delegations stayed at the hotel and signed the Rhodes Declaration. Prior to the summit, the hotel built six presidential suites to host the head of states.

In 1992, Rodos Palace expanded its International Conference Center to accommodate 4,800 attendees with 9,900 square meters of space. A year later, an Executive Wing was added to the hotel.

In 1998, Rodos Palace built additional suites for the Western European Union's summit. Two years later, in 2000, the Royal Suite was renovated for guests including Queen Rania of Jordan, Patriarch Bartholomew, and the Viceroy of Saudi Arabia.

In 2019, Rodos Palace built Abav2 rooms based on modern and sustainable architecture.

In 2024, Katerina Sakellaropoulou, president of Greece, hosted the local government congress at the hotel.

== Guests ==
Over the years, Margaret Thatcher, François Mitterrand, Felipe González, Helmut Kohl, Queen Rania, Ruud Lubbers, and Wilfried Martens have stayed at the hotel.

== Architecture ==
Rodos Palace’s design combines elements of ancient Greek and modern architecture. The hotel complex covers an area of 120,000 square meters and features garden suites, VIP bungalows, private villas, and abav2 rooms.
