= Véronique Caprasse =

Belgian politician (born 1950)

Véronique Caprasse (born 20 November 1950 in Lüdenscheid, Germany) is a Belgian politician and a member of DéFI, a French-speaker interests party in and around the Brussels region. She was mayor of Kraainem from 2013 to 2015 and former member of the Belgian Federal Parliament. Caprasse was a member of the Chamber of Representatives from 2014 to 2019.
