= Tindemans group =

Lobby group

The Tindemans Group was an EU group of reflection in 1994-1995, set up with the aim of bringing the general public into the debate about the 1996 Intergovernmental Conference with a view to enlargement with new member states from Central and Eastern Europe. It was chaired by Leo Tindemans, former Prime Minister of Belgium; secretary of the Group was Sammy van Tuyll van Serooskerken. The Group consisted of 48 politicians, civil servants and experts from all member states and from all major political affiliations. The members of the Group had different backgrounds, different views on government and different views on Europe, such as how far it should be integrated and how decisions should be made. They shared one view in common: the decision about the future of the European Union cannot be taken without the involvement of the citizens of its member states.

The Group stressed the need to discuss the institutional framework of the European Union with a view to the enlargement of the Union. It pointed out that if the countries of Central and Eastern Europe would join the Union, membership could eventually reach as many as thirty countries. Such an enlargement will require effective decision-making procedures, but at the same time there would be a growing risk that people will feel dissociated from decision taking in such a large organisation.

Members of the Group were, amongst others: Jens-Peter Bonde, Elmar Brok, Bill Cash, François Froment-Meurice, Élisabeth Guigou, Ernst Hirsch Ballin, Fientje Moerman, Richard Portes, Nicolas Schmitt, Leo Tindemans (chairman), Sammy van Tuyll van Serooskerken, (secretary of the Group), Frank Vibert.

The Group wrote a report, “Europe: Your choice”, describing five options for tomorrow's Europe. The five scenarios range from a less integrated Europe to the equivalent of the United States of Europe. The scenarios can be briefly described as follows.

- Scenario 0: The current situation, presented for comparison
- Scenario 1: Several modifications to the current situation, discussed separately.
- Scenario 2: The Commission is the main policy-making body in the Union, accountable to a bi-cameral Parliament. The Council assigns policy areas to the Union level and applies a subsidiarity test.
- Scenario 3: The Council has the primary responsibility for taking the initiative in public policy; the Commission has an administrative task; the Parliament is bi-cameral, with one Chamber, consisting of Members of the national Parlia¬ments, ensuring that European measures are really necessary.
- Scenario 4: The Commission becomes a "European government", accountable to a bi-cameral European Parliament; the Council is transformed into one of its Chambers, the European Senate.
- Scenario 5: The Council is the decision making body; the Commission gives administrative support; the Parliament has an advisory role.

It was not the aim of the Tindemans Group to specifically recommend any of these scenarios. It is up to the reader to draw his own conclusions.

The report of the Tindemans Group was presented to the President of the European Commission, the President of the European Parliament and the President of the Council in December 1995. It was published in English, French, German and Spanish.
