= Union of Marxist–Leninist Communists of Belgium =

The Union of Marxist–Leninist Communists of Belgium (French: Union des Communistes Marxistes-Leninistes de Belgique) was a minor Communist party in Belgium, having existed during 1970–1976.
