= Leo Tindemans =

Belgian politician (1922–2014)

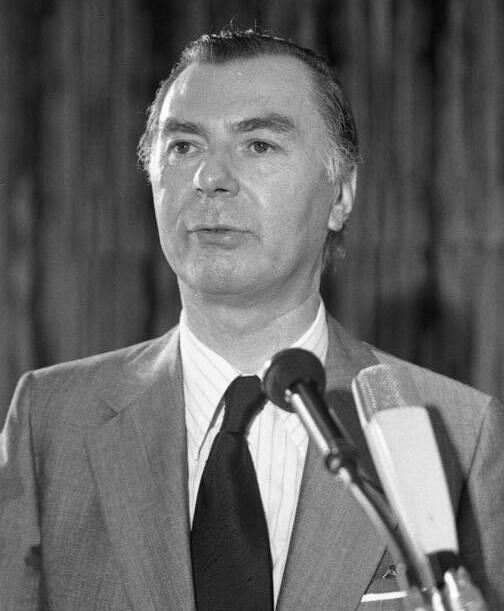
- Tindemans in 1977

Prime Minister of Belgium
- In office 25 April 1974 – 20 October 1978
- Monarch: Baudouin
- Preceded by: Edmond Leburton
- Succeeded by: Paul Vanden Boeynants

Minister of Foreign Affairs
- In office 17 December 1981 – 19 June 1989
- Prime Minister: Wilfried Martens
- Preceded by: Charles-Ferdinand Nothomb
- Succeeded by: Mark Eyskens

President of the European People's Party
- In office 8 July 1976 – 1985
- Preceded by: Position established
- Succeeded by: Piet Bukman

Personal details
- Born: Leonard Clemence Tindemans; 16 April 1922 Zwijndrecht, Belgium
- Died: 26 December 2014 (aged 92) Edegem, Belgium
- Party: CD&V
- Spouse: Rosa Naesens
- Children: 4
- Education: University of Antwerp; Ghent University; Catholic University of Leuven

Leonard Clemence "Leo" Tindemans (Dutch: [ˈleːjoː ˈtɪndəmɑns]; 16 April 1922 – 26 December 2014) was a Belgian politician. He served as the prime minister of Belgium from 25 April 1974 until he resigned as minister on 20 October 1978. He was a member of the Christian Democratic and Flemish party.

Tindemanns led a centre-right cabinet from 1974 to 1977, followed by a centre-left cabinet from 1977 to 1978.

== Early life ==
Tindemans was born in Zwijndrecht, Belgium, to a Catholic family.

== Political career ==
=== Early career ===
Tindemans was affiliated with the CVP. At the time, the party was strong in the northern region of Flanders. Tindemans was elected to the Belgian Chamber of Representatives in 1961 and re-elected in 1965, 1968, 1971, 1974, 1977 and 1978. From 1965 to 1973 Tindemans also served as the mayor of Edegem.

In 1968, Tindemans became minister tasked with the relations between the communities (1968–1972), during which he prepared the first constitutional reform, which saw Belgium start transforming into a federal state. In 1972 he became minister for agriculture (1972–1973). In 1973 he became deputy Prime Minister and minister for the budget (1973–1974).

=== Prime Minister (1974–1978) ===
Tindemans served as Prime Minister of two Belgian governments, from 25 April 1974 to 20 October 1978. His first cabinet was a minority government formed by the Christian-democrats and liberals. When his first government fell in 1977, Tindemans won the snap general election with 983,000 votes, still a record for any election in Belgium. This formed his second cabinet with the Christian-democrats, socialists and Flemish nationalists. His second government (1977–1978) fell due to the controversy surrounding the Egmont pact.

He was awarded the Charlemagne Prize 1976.

=== Tindemans Report ===
At the conclusion of the Paris Summit in 1974, Tindemans was tasked with devising a report to define what was meant by the term 'European Union.' Consulting not only reports drawn up by the European Parliament, European Commission and the European Court of Justice, Tindemans also sought advice from members of European governments and "other powerful forces in the various States". Tindemans deliberately sought to avoid using the term constitution, and instead referred to his proposals as "a new phase in the history of the unification of Europe which can only be achieved by a continuous process". Four major areas were outlined in the report: European foreign policy, European economic and social policies, European citizen rights, and the strengthening of existing European institutions.

Regarding a common foreign policy, Tindemans argues that Europe must present itself united outward, not only in security, tariffs and trade, but also in an economic sense. He advocated for the creation of a single decision-making centre to handle these issues, and making foreign policy cooperation between member states a legal obligation – Tindemans felt that this role largely would lie within a strengthened Council. He argued for placing the interest of joint action above each country's own interests, and advocated for placing a delegate responsible for representing a collective Europe's decisions. In addition, Tindemans placed particular emphasis on strengthening Europe-United States relations, proposing that a delegate be assigned to represent the European Union to the United States. Lastly on the foreign policy front, Tindemans advocated for the eventual creation of a common defence policy.

On the economic and social policy front, Tindemans advocated for reigniting discussions about a common economic and monetary policy, which had stalled in Europe during the early 1970s recession. As part of this revival of talks, he also advocated for the consolidation and modification of the snake. He proposed expanding the scope of monetary policy by establishing an internal monetary policy, budgetary policy, and plans for the control of inflation. Tindemans supported abolishing the remaining obstacles to free trade of capital that existed within the European Economic Community. Finally, Tindemans hoped for a citizen's Europe; he advocated for European civil rights, consumer rights, and protection of the environment. He also pushed for a European passport union, and creation of integrated educational systems. Finally, Tindemans encouraged broad institutional reform, pushing for increased powers to the European Parliament, and overall reform for the European Council, the Council of Ministers, and the European Commission.

Due to economic conditions at the time, the Tindemans report failed to make an immediate impact. Despite this, the report generated a request from the Council of Foreign Ministers and the commission to create an annual progress report on the European Union. In addition, though quite optimistic and federalist in scope, several items which Tindemans advocated for eventually found themselves in the European Union, such as a common economic and foreign policy, as well as symbols for the European Union.

=== Transnational networks ===
In the 1970s he was a regular Le Cercle participant (Johannes Grossmann, Die Internationale der Konservativen, München 2014, p. 473).

He participated in at least one Bilderberg Conference in Aachen in 1980. He appears on the provisional list of participants for the 1967 Bilderberg Conference which means that he was invited and accepted the invitation. He either cancelled at the last minute or was omitted from the official list of participants.

== Later career ==
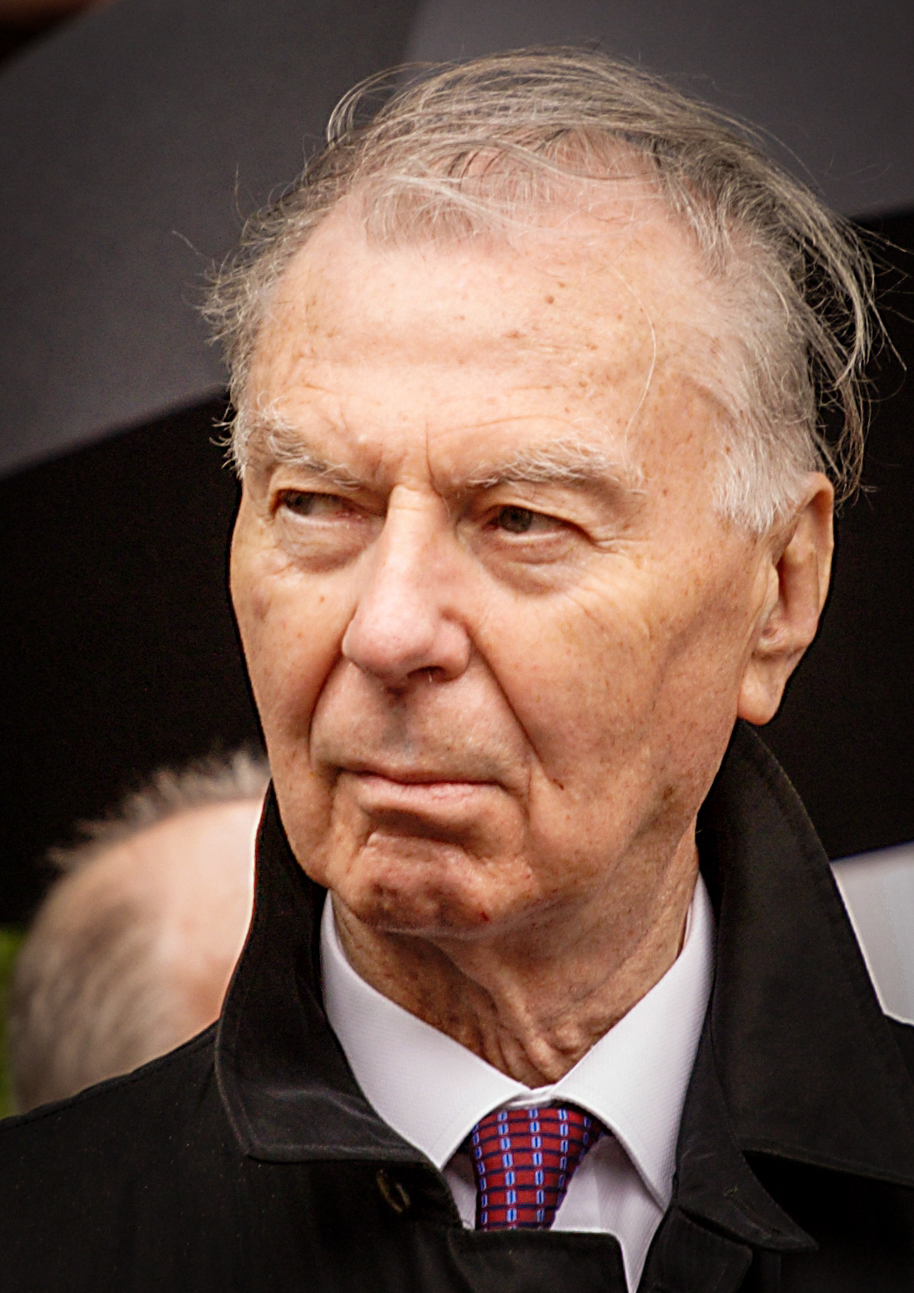
Tindemans in 2006

In 1976, during the founding Congress of the European People's Party in Brussels, he was elected first President of the new party, a role which gave him the important tasks of harmonising and finding consensus between the different leaders and member parties of the EPP and of leading the party during the first direct elections to the European Parliament in 1979.

Tindemans received an Honorary Doctorate from Heriot-Watt University in 1978.

Tindemans was elected to the European Parliament with a record number of votes (983.000 votes, which is still a record for any election in Belgium) and was a member of that parliament from 1979 to 1981 (during which time he also was chairman of the CVP). With the general elections of 1981, Tindemans returned to Belgian politics and became minister of foreign affairs (1981–1989). With the European elections in 1989 Tindemans went back to the European Parliament where he served two terms until he retired in 1999. During 1994–1995 he was chairman of the Tindemans group.

== Death ==
Tindemans died on 26 December 2014 in Edegem, Antwerp, Belgium, aged 92.

== Honours ==
- Belgium: Minister of State by Royal Decree.
- Belgium: Grand Cordon in the Order of Leopold.
- Belgium: Knight Grand Cross in the Order of the Crown.
- Grand Cross in the Order of Merit of the Austrian Republic.

Political offices
Preceded by Edmond Leburton	Prime Minister of Belgium; 1974–1978	Succeeded by Paul Vanden Boeynants
