= Walloon Rally =

Walloon Rally Rassemblement wallon
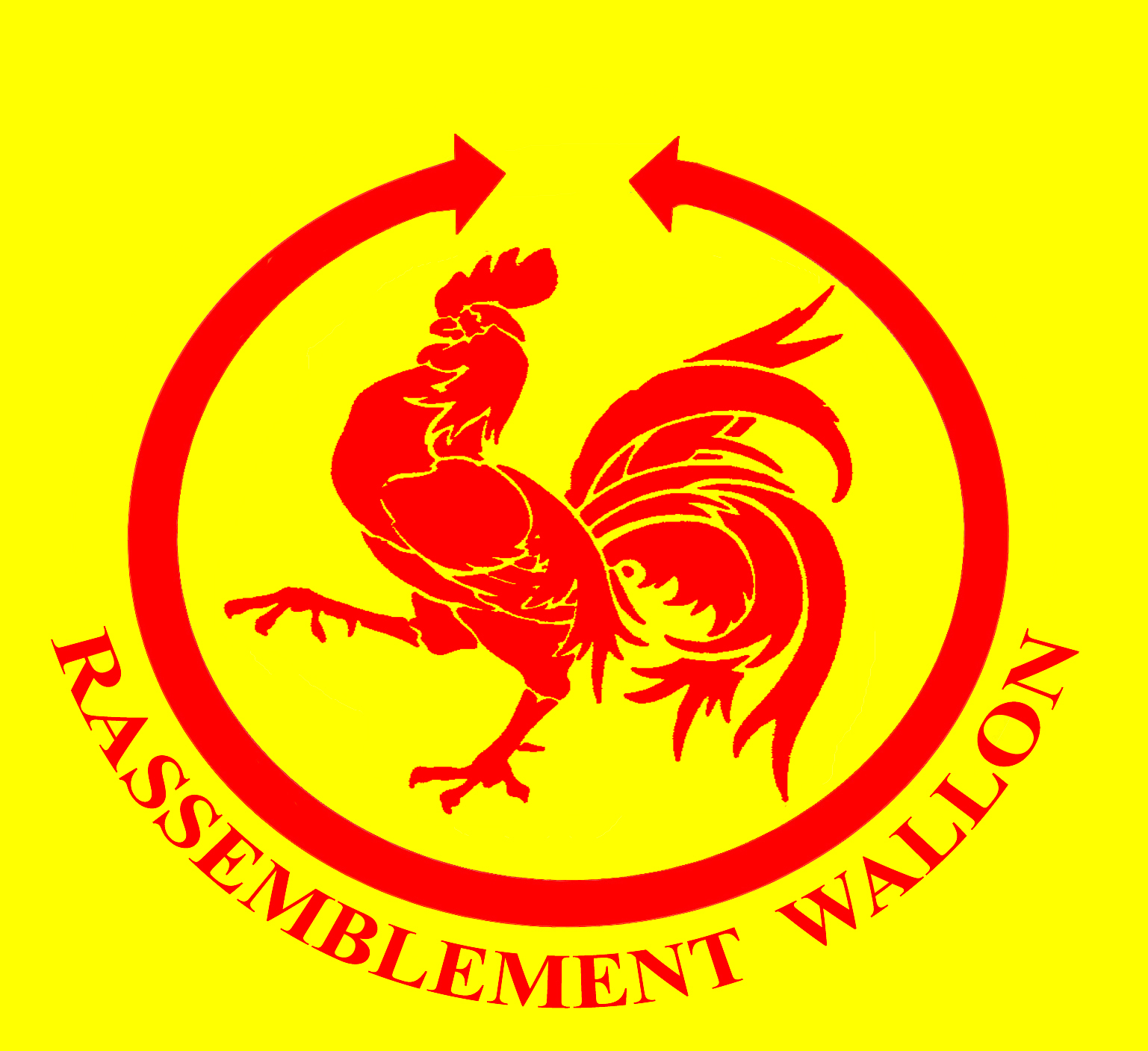
- Leader: Claude Thayse
- Founded: 1968
- Headquarters: Charleroi
- Ideology: Regionalism; Walloon independentism Rattachism
- Political position: Centre to centre-left

The Walloon Rally (French: Rassemblement wallon, pronounced [ʁasɑ̃bləmɑ̃ walɔ̃]; RW) is a regionalist political party in Belgium, active in Wallonia since 1968. The party favoured federalism and since 1985 independence.

Founded on 7 March 1968, the party contested the Belgian general election of 1968 in a coalition with the FDF, a Brussels-based francophone political party, receiving 5.9% of the vote nationally. The party's own results in elections to the Belgian Federal Parliament were as follows.

Election	1968	1971	1974	1977	1978	1981
Percentage of national vote	3.35	6.69	5.86	2.96	2.86	1.71
Seats	5	14	13	5	4	2

The increasing federalisation of Belgium, and the adoption of some of the party's policies by the traditional francophone parties, resulted in a sharp decline in electoral support from 1977 onwards. A split in the early 1980s created the Walloon Popular Rally, a more left-wing grouping, which later merged with the Socialist Party. The Wallonia-France Rally, which supports the union of Wallonia and France, was formed by the rump of the party's membership in 1999. Afterwards, the Walloon Rally left the WFR and formed Union For Wallonia with the France Party, Wallonia Social Democracy, Get Up Wallonia and the Brussels' Walloons.

In 2010, Union For Wallonia, which took part in June federal elections under the name W+, was renamed Walloon Rally, which was its largest component.

== See also ==
- 1960-1961 Winter General Strike
- Manifesto for Walloon culture
