= Wilfried Martens =

Belgian politician (1936–2013)

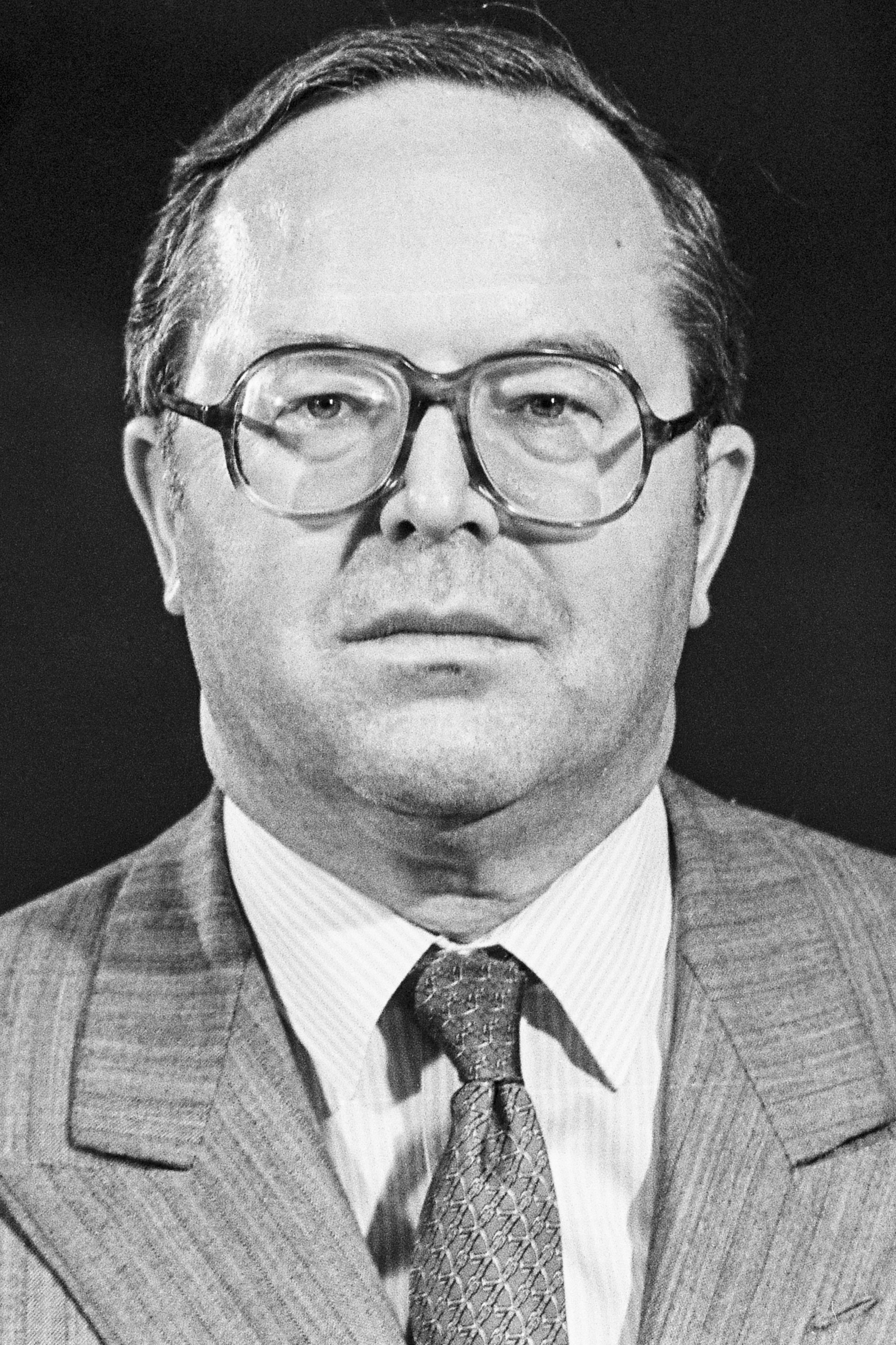
- Martens in 1987

Leader of the European People's Party-European Democrats
- In office 20 July 1994 – 20 July 1999
- Preceded by: Leo Tindemans
- Succeeded by: Hans-Gert Pöttering

President of the European People's Party
- In office 16 July 1990 – 9 October 2013
- Preceded by: Jacques Santer
- Succeeded by: Joseph Daul

Prime Minister of Belgium
- In office 17 December 1981 – 7 March 1992
- Monarch: Baudouin
- Preceded by: Mark Eyskens
- Succeeded by: Jean-Luc Dehaene
- In office 3 March 1979 – 6 April 1981
- Monarch: Baudouin
- Preceded by: Paul Vanden Boeynants
- Succeeded by: Mark Eyskens

Personal details
- Born: Wilfried Achiel Emma Martens; 19 April 1936 Sleidinge, Belgium
- Died: 9 October 2013 (aged 77) Lokeren, Belgium
- Party: Christian People's Party
- Spouses: Lieve Verschroeven (m. 1962; div. 1997) Ilse Schouteden (m. 1998; div. 2007) Miet Smet (m. 2008)
- Children: 5
- Education: Catholic University of Leuven
- Wilfried Martens's voice Martens refusing the second position on the Christian People's Party list in the 1999 European Parliament election Recorded 25 February 1999

Wilfried Achiel Emma Martens (Dutch: [ˈʋɪlfrit ˈmɑrtəns]; 19 April 1936 – 9 October 2013) was a Belgian politician who served as prime minister of Belgium from 1979 to 1992, except from April to December 1981. A member of the Flemish Christian People's Party, during his premiership he oversaw the transformation of Belgium into a federal state. He was one of the founders of the European People's Party.

During his time as prime minister, Martens led a series of centre-right and centre-left cabinets.

== Early life ==
Martens was born on 19 April 1936 in the village of Sleidinge, East Flanders, the son of modest small farmers. He studied law at the Catholic University of Leuven, graduating in 1960. Martens became active in the Flemish Movement as a student. He began to draw public attention in 1957 when, as president of the Flemish Youth Committee, he organized a march to protest the lack of Flemish presence in the 1958 Brussels World's Fair, and was subsequently arrested while protesting the opening of the exposition.

== Political career ==
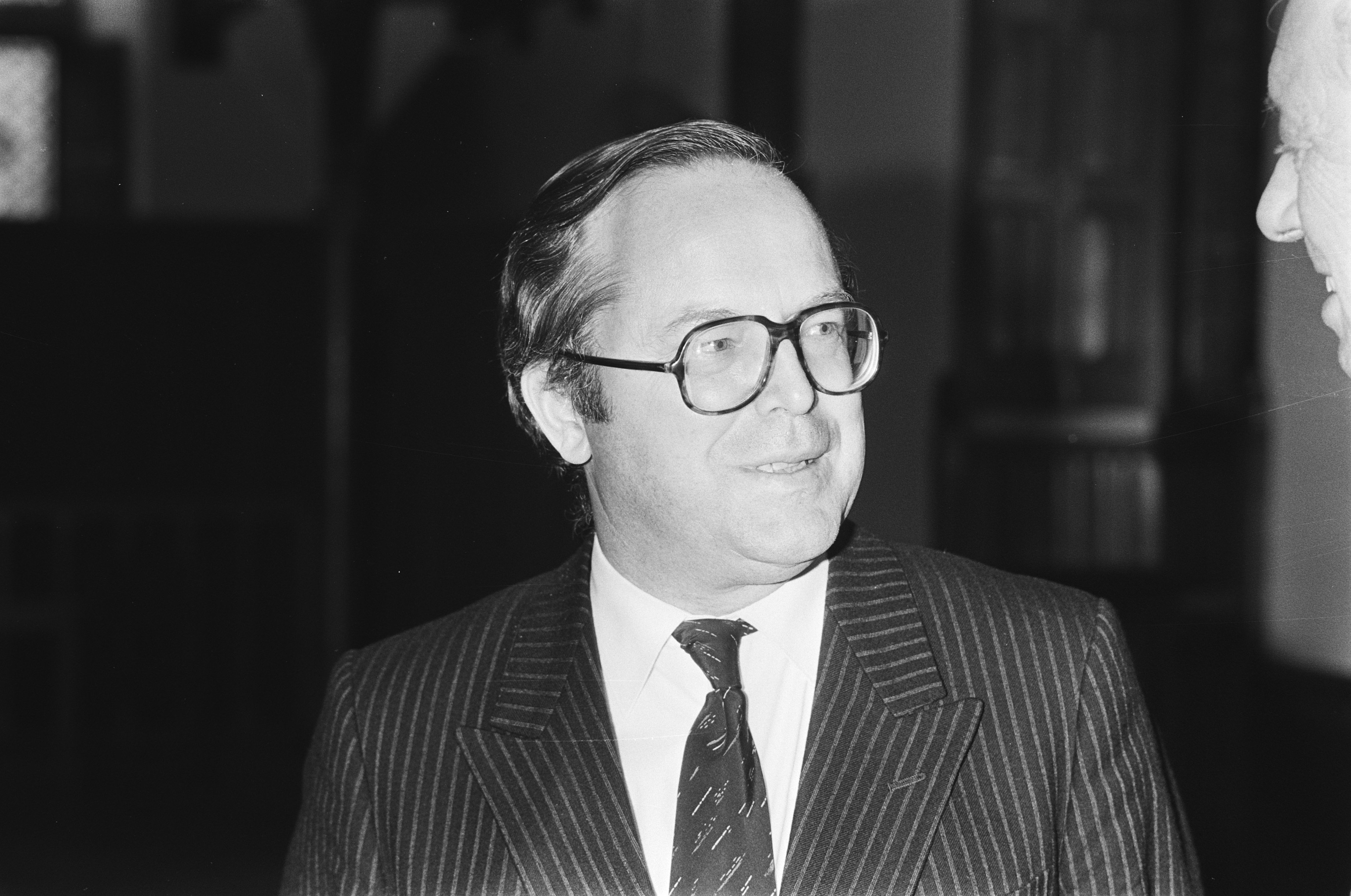
Martens in 1982

In 1965, Martens joined the Christian People's Party or CD&V, (since renamed to Christian Democratic and Flemish). He served as the party's chairman from 1972 to 1979, sitting as a deputy in the Chamber of Representatives from 1974 to 1991, and serving as a Senator from 1991 to 1994.

Wilfried Martens served as Prime Minister in nine coalition governments (Martens I-IX) from 3 April 1979 to 6 April 1981 and 17 December 1981 to 7 March 1992. His period in office was dominated by the economic crisis of the 1980s and the state reforms of 1980 and 1988 which set Belgium on a path to federalism.

He co-founded the European People's Party (EPP) in 1976 and was EPP President from 1992 until his death.

From 1993, he was President of the European Union of Christian Democrats (EUCD), until its merger with the EPP in 1996. Martens also negotiated with Finnish politician Sauli Niinistö the merger of the European Democrat Union (EDU) into the EPP (formally concluded in 2002). The successful fusion of all centre-right European organisations into the EPP – currently the largest transnational European political party with 75 member-parties from 40 countries – is widely recognised as an important achievement of his European political legacy.

From 1994 to 1998, he was a Member of the European Parliament, chairing the EPP Group.

From October 2000 to November 2001, he was also the President of the Christian Democrat International (CDI).

He re-appeared on the Belgian political stage on 22 December 2008 to help in the 2007–2011 Belgian political crisis.

Martens held a doctorate in law, a degree in notarial studies, as well as a baccalaureate in Thomistic philosophy from the Catholic University of Louvain. He also studied international political science at Harvard University. He practised law at the Ghent court of appeal.

Among numerous national and international distinctions, he was honoured in 1998 with the Charles V European Award for his contribution to European integration.

== Private life ==
Martens had five children: two from his first marriage with Lieve Verschroeven (Kris and Anne) and three with Ilse Schouteden (Sarah, Sophie and Simon). After the birth of their twins in 1997 they married on 13 November 1998. Ilse Schouteden has a son from her previous marriage. In 2007 he divorced his second wife. On 27 September 2008 he married Miet Smet, a former Belgian minister. It was his third marriage and her first. After the death of his first wife, Martens was able to celebrate the marriage to Miet Smet in the Catholic Church, on 27 April 2013.

== Death and tributes ==
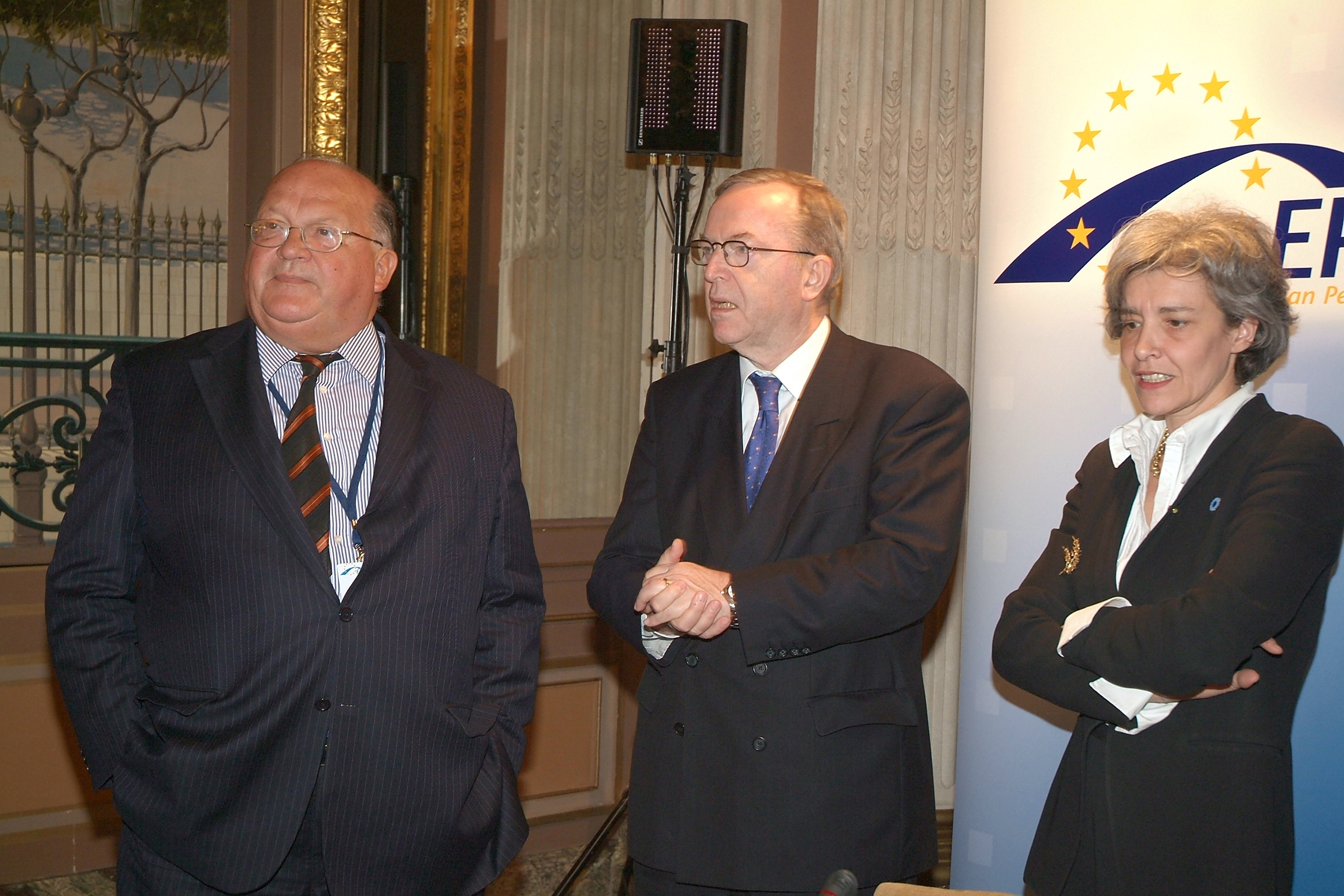
Wilfried Martens (center) with Jean-Luc Dehaene (left) and Claudie Haigneré (right) at a European People's Party (EPP) meeting in 2005

Martens suffered from pancreatic cancer and ended his life via euthanasia on the 9th of October, 2013 at his home in Lokeren; he was 77. Elio Di Rupo, the Belgian prime minister, described him as a "true statesman and one of the fathers of federal Belgium". Martin Schulz, president of the European Parliament, paid tribute to him as a "statesman of Belgium, Europe and an outstanding leader of European Parliament". Jerzy Buzek, EPP MEP and former prime minister of Poland, described him as "irreplaceable". He received a state funeral he was buried in the cemetery of Campo Santo.

The EPP think tank Centre for European Studies has been renamed after him, now being the "Wilfried Martens Centre for European Studies", a decision taken during the EPP Congress in Dublin held on 9 March 2014.

== Honours ==
- Belgium:
  - Minister of State, by Royal Decree.
  - Grand officer in the Order of Leopold
  - Grand Cross in the Order of Leopold II
  - Grand Cross in the Order of the Crown

=== Foreign honours ===
- Austria: Grand Decoration of Honour in Gold, Decoration of Honour for Services to the Republic of Austria (30 May 1985)
- France:
  - Knight Grand Cross in the National Order of Merit (28 February 1983)
  - Grand Officer in the Legion of Honour.
- Croatia: Grand Cross of the Grand Order of Queen Jelena (22 December 2006)
- Germany: Knight Grand Cross in the Order of Merit of the Federal Republic of Germany (7 February 1984)
- Greece: Knight Grand Cross in the Order of the Phoenix
- Iceland: Knight Grand Cross of the Order of the Falcon (16 October 1979)
- Italy: Grand Cross of the Order of Merit of the Italian Republic (20 February 1986)
- Mexico: "Banda" of the Order of the Aztec Eagle (14 June 1985)
- Portugal:
  - Grand Cross of the Order of Christ (10 December 1982)
  - Grand Cross in the Order of Prince Henry (31 October 1987)
- Spain: Knight Grand Cross in the Order of Isabella the Catholic (March 1980)
- Netherlands: Knight Grand Cross in the Order of Orange-Nassau.
- Luxemburg: Knight Grand Cross in the Order of the Oak Crown (20 June 1984)
- Grand Officer in the Ordre du Croissant vert, Commores (9 June 1982)

== See also ==
- Pierre Carette
- Wilfried Martens Centre for European Studies

== Publications ==
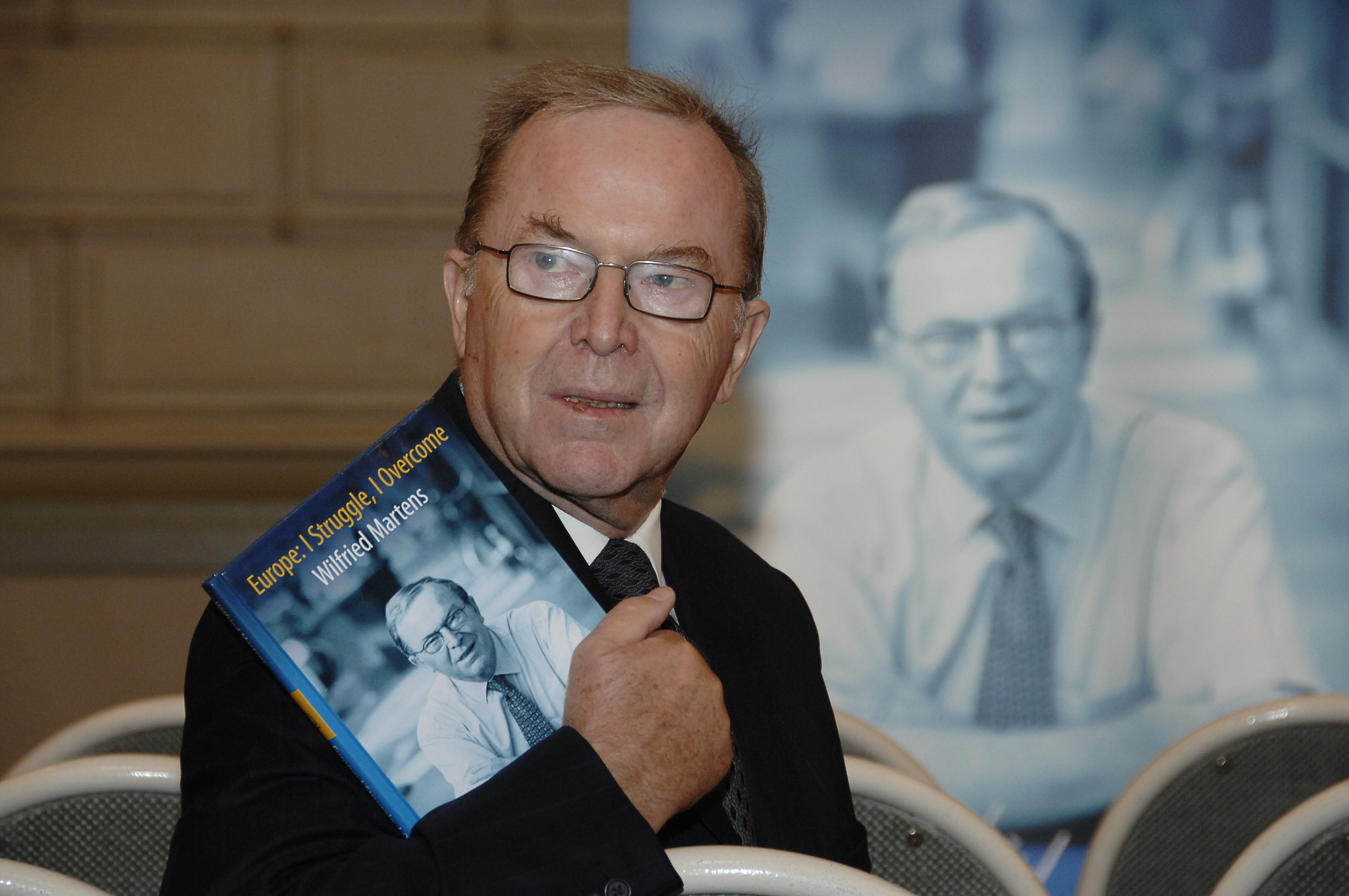
On 10 September 2009, Wilfried Martens presented his book Europe: I Struggle, I Overcome in a public event organized by the Centre for European Studies (CES), the official think-tank of the European People's Party.

- Een gegeven woord, Lannoo, Tielt, 1985.
- Europa voorbij Oost en West, Lannoo, Tielt, 1995.
- De Memoires, Luctor et Emergo, Lannoo, Tielt, 2006.
- Europe: I Struggle, I Overcome, Springer Science+Business Media, 2009.

Political offices
Preceded by Paul Vanden Boeynants	Prime Minister of Belgium; 1979–1981	Succeeded by Mark Eyskens
Preceded by Mark Eyskens	Prime Minister of Belgium; 1981–1992	Succeeded by Jean-Luc Dehaene
Party political offices
Preceded by Robert Vandekerckhove	President of the Christian People's Party; 1972–1979	Succeeded by Leo Tindemans
Preceded by Jacques Santer	President of the European People's Party; 1992–2013	Succeeded by Joseph Daul
Preceded by Leo Tindemans	Leader of the European People's Party; 1994–1999	Succeeded by Hans-Gert Pöttering
