= Anticapitalist Left (Belgium) =

Belgian political party

The Anticapitalist Left (French: Gauche anticapitaliste, GA), also known as Current for an Anticapitalist Project (Dutch: Stroming voor een Anticapitalistisch Project, SAP), is a Belgian Trotskyist political party. It is the Belgian section of the Fourth International. In the 2010 election, Front des gauches (CP, LCR, PSL and PH) received 1.15% of votes for the Senat.

The party was long led by Ernest Mandel. It publishes La Gauche and Rood.

== History ==
In May 1971, former members of the Confédération socialiste des travailleurs (Note: Created from the merger of the Parti wallon des travailleurs and the Union de la gauche socialiste) founded the Ligue révolutionnaire des travailleurs (LRT) (Dutch: Revolutionnaire arbeidersliga (RAL)) as the Belgian section of the Fourth International.

In February 1984, at its seventh congress, the LRT changed its name to Parti ouvrier socialiste (POS) (Dutch: Socialistische arbeiderspartij (SAP)). At the end of 2005, the POS decided to change its French name to the Ligue communiste révolutionnaire (LCR).

On 9 October 2017, the LCR decided to partially change its name in French to the Gauche anticapitaliste, while its Dutch name became Stroming voor een Antikapitalistisch Project (SAP).

== Electoral results ==
=== Federal Parliament ===
==== Chamber of Representatives ====
Election year	# of overall votes	% of overall vote	% of language group vote	# of overall seats won	# of language group seats won	+/-	Notes
1987	31,446	0.5		0 / 212			
1991	5,243	0.1		0 / 212		0	

==== Senate ====
Election year	# of overall votes	% of overall vote	% of language group vote	# of overall seats won	# of language group seats won	+/-	Notes
1987	32,187	0.5		0 / 70			
1991	6,485	0.1		0 / 70		0	
