= Party of German-speaking Belgians =

Belgian political party

Party of German-speaking Belgians Partei der Deutschsprachigen Belgier
- Abbreviation: PDB
- Founded: 1971 (as CUW)
- Dissolved: 2008
- Split from: Christlich Soziale Partei
- Merged into: ProDG
- Ideology: Christian democracy Regionalism
- Political position: Right-wing
- Regional affiliation: PJU–PDB (1995–2008)
- European affiliation: European Free Alliance; Federal Union of European Nationalities
- Most PDG MPs (1977–81): 7 / 25

Website
- www.pju-pdb.be

The Party of German-speaking Belgians (German: Partei der Deutschsprachigen Belgier [paʁˈtaɪ deːɐ̯ ˈdɔʏtʃˌʃpʁaːxɪɡn̩ ˈbɛlɡi̯ɐ]; PDB) was a regionalist political party active in the German-speaking Community of Belgium founded in 1971. The party was a founder member of the European Free Alliance in 1981.

The party has been accused of supporting irredentism and was involved in a scandal surrounding Hermann-Niermann-Stiftung which itself had ties to far-right groups.

In 2008 the party was succeeded by ProDG.
