= Nivelles (Chamber of Representatives constituency) =

Belgian political subdivision

Nivelles was a constituency used to elect a single member of the Belgian Chamber of Representatives between 1900 and 1999.

== Representatives ==
Election	Representative (Party)	Representative (Party)	Representative (Party)	Representative (Party)	Representative (Party)	Representative (Party)
1831	Jean-Baptiste Cols (Liberal)	Pierre Milcamps (Catholic)	Théodore Jonet (Liberal)	3 seats		
1833	Félix de Merode (Catholic)	Pierre Milcamps (Catholic)	Louis de Le Hoye (Liberal)	3 seats		
1837	Félix de Merode (Catholic)	Pierre Milcamps (Catholic)	Edouard Mercier (Liberal)	3 seats		
1841	Félix de Merode (Catholic)	Théodore Jonet (Liberal)	Edouard Mercier (Liberal)	3 seats		
1845	Félix de Merode (Catholic)	Théodore Jonet (Liberal)	Edouard Mercier (Liberal)	Hippolyte Trémouroux (Liberal)	4 seats	
1848	Félix de Merode (Catholic)	François Mascart (Liberal)	Edouard Mercier (Liberal)	Hippolyte Trémouroux (Liberal)	4 seats	
1852	Félix de Merode (Catholic)	François Mascart (Liberal)	Edouard Mercier (Liberal)	Hippolyte Trémouroux (Liberal)	4 seats	
1856	Charles Snoy (Catholic)	François Mascart (Liberal)	Edouard Mercier (Liberal)	Hippolyte Trémouroux (Liberal)	4 seats	
1857	Charles Snoy (Catholic)	Guillaume Nélis (Liberal)	Edouard Mercier (Liberal)	Louis de Chentinnes (Liberal)	4 seats	
1861	Charles Snoy (Catholic)	Guillaume Nélis (Liberal)	Adolphe Le Hardy de Beaulieu (Liberal)	François Mascart (Liberal)	4 seats	
1864	Charles Snoy (Catholic)	Guillaume Nélis (Liberal)	Adolphe Le Hardy de Beaulieu (Liberal)	François Mascart (Liberal)	4 seats	
1868	Charles Snoy (Catholic)	Guillaume Nélis (Liberal)	Adolphe Le Hardy de Beaulieu (Liberal)	Alexandre de Vrints Treuenfeld (Liberal)	4 seats	
1870	Léon T'Serstevens (Catholic)	Charles Snoy (Catholic)	Adolphe Le Hardy de Beaulieu (Liberal)	Alexandre de Vrints Treuenfeld (Liberal)	4 seats	
1874	Louis Mascart (Liberal)	Xavier Victor Olin (Liberal)	Adolphe Le Hardy de Beaulieu (Liberal)	Alexandre de Vrints Treuenfeld (Liberal)	4 seats	
1878	Louis Mascart (Liberal)	Xavier Victor Olin (Liberal)	Adolphe Le Hardy de Beaulieu (Liberal)	Alexandre de Vrints Treuenfeld (Liberal)	4 seats	
1882	Eugène Dumont (Catholic)	Georges Snoy (Catholic)	Jules de Burlet (Catholic)	Léon Pastur (Catholic)	4 seats	
1886	Eugène Dumont (Catholic)	Georges Snoy (Catholic)	Emile Henricot (Liberal)	Léon Pastur (Catholic)	4 seats	
1890	Eugène Dumont (Catholic)	Georges Snoy (Catholic)	Emile Henricot (Liberal)	Léon Pastur (Catholic)	4 seats	
1892	Jules de Burlet (Catholic)	Georges Snoy (Catholic)	Emile Henricot (Liberal)	Léon Pastur (Catholic)	4 seats	
1894	Emile de Lalieux de La Rocq (Catholic)	Georges Snoy (Catholic)	Jules Melchior Brabant (Catholic)	Louis Stouffs (Catholic)	4 seats	
1898	Emile de Lalieux de La Rocq (Catholic)	Georges Snoy (Catholic)	Jules Melchior Brabant (Catholic)	Louis Stouffs (Catholic)	4 seats	
1900	Alphonse Allard (PS)	Georges Snoy (Catholic)	Jules Melchior Brabant (Catholic)	Léon Jourez (Liberal)	4 seats	
1904	Alphonse Allard (PS)	Georges Snoy (Catholic)	Emile de Lalieux de La Rocq (Catholic)	Léon Jourez (Liberal)	4 seats	
1908	Alphonse Allard (PS)	Adolphe May (Liberal)	Emile de Lalieux de La Rocq (Catholic)	Léon Jourez (Liberal)	4 seats	
1912	Alphonse Allard (PS)	Maximilien Pastur (Catholic)	Paul Terlinden (Catholic)	Léon Jourez (Liberal)	4 seats	
1919	Alphonse Allard (PS)	Maximilien Pastur (Catholic)	Jules Mathieu (PS)	Léon Jourez (Liberal)	4 seats	
1921	Henri Delor (PS)	Pierre de Burlet (Catholic)	Jules Mathieu (PS)	Léon Jourez (Liberal)	4 seats	
1925	Henri Delor (PS)	Pierre de Burlet (Catholic)	Jules Mathieu (PS)	Henri Lepage (PS)	4 seats	
1929	Henri Delor (PS)	Pierre de Burlet (Catholic)	Jules Mathieu (PS)	Eugène Everaerts de Velp (Catholic)	4 seats	
1932	Henri Delor (PS)	Pierre de Burlet (Catholic)	Jules Mathieu (PS)	Henri Lepage (PS)	4 seats	
1936	Henri Delor (PS)	Louis Delvaux (Catholic)	Charles-Emmanuel Janssen (Liberal)	Henri Lepage (PS)	Paul Collet (REX)	5 seats
1939	Alphonse Clignez (PS)	Louis Delvaux (Catholic)	Charles-Emmanuel Janssen (Liberal)	Sylvain Sohest (PS)	Jean Borremans (PCB)	5 seats
1946	Gaston Baccus (BSP)	Jules Descampe (CVP)	Léon Ernest Deltenre (BSP)	Werner Marchand (UDB)	Jean Borremans (PCB)	5 seats
1949	Gaston Baccus (BSP)	Jules Descampe (CVP)	Léon Ernest Deltenre (BSP)	Léon Delhache (CVP)	Raymond Becquevort (Liberal)	5 seats
1950	Félix Georges Camby (BSP)	Jean Borremans (PCB)	Léon Ernest Deltenre (BSP)	Jean-Baptiste Junion (CVP)	Justin Peeters (BSP)	5 seats
1954	Auguste Baccus (BSP)	Léon Delhache (CVP)	Léon Ernest Deltenre (BSP)	Raymond Becquevort (Liberal)	Justin Peeters (BSP)	5 seats
1958	Auguste Baccus (BSP)	Léon Delhache (CVP)	Léon Ernest Deltenre (BSP)	Gaston Moulin (PCB)	Justin Peeters (BSP)	5 seats
1961	Auguste Baccus (BSP)	Léon Delhache (CVP)	Jules Bary (BSP)	Jean Lenoir (CVP)	Justin Peeters (BSP)	5 seats
1965	Auguste Baccus (BSP)	Léon Delhache (CVP)	Jules Bary (BSP)	Jean-Claude Ciselet (PVV)	Robert Fernand Hulet (PVV)	5 seats
1968	Jules Gendebien (PVV)	Pierre Rouelle (RW)	Jules Bary (BSP)	Jean-Claude Ciselet (PVV)	Robert Fernand Hulet (PVV)	5 seats
1971	Georges Maes (RW)	Pierre Rouelle (RW)	Alfred Scokaert (PSB)	Marcel Plasman (cdH)	René Basecq (PSB)	5 seats
1974	Georges Maes (RW)	Pierre Rouelle (RW)	Alfred Scokaert (PSB)	Marcel Plasman (cdH)	Geneviève Ryckmans-Corin (cdH)	5 seats
1977	Robert Fernand Hulet (PRL)	Pierre Rouelle (RW)	Alfred Scokaert (PSB)	Marcel Plasman (cdH)	Serge Kubla (PRL)	5 seats
1978	Louis Michel (PRL)	André Jandrain (PS)	Geneviève Ryckmans-Corin (cdH)	Raymond Langendries (cdH)	Serge Kubla (PRL)	5 seats
1981	Louis Michel (PRL)	Didier Bajura (PCB)	Mathilde Boniface (RW)	Valmy Féaux (PS)	Serge Kubla (PRL)	5 seats
1985	Louis Michel (PRL)	André Antoine (cdH)	Léon Walry (PS)	Valmy Féaux (PS)	Serge Kubla (PRL)	Yves-Jean du Monceau de Bergendal (cdH)
1988	Louis Michel (PRL)	André Antoine (cdH)	Léon Walry (PS)	Valmy Féaux (PS)	Serge Kubla (PRL)	André Lagasse (DéFI)
1991	Louis Michel (PRL)	Raymond Langendries (cdH)	Léon Walry (PS)	André Flahaut (PS)	Serge Kubla (PRL)	Marcel Cheron (Ecolo)
1995	Louis Michel (PRL)	Raymond Langendries (cdH)	Alberto Borin (PS)	Maurice Minne (PS)	Jacqueline Herzet (PRL)	5 seats
1999	Serge Van Overtveldt (PRL)	Raymond Langendries (cdH)	Maurice Dehu (PS)	Michèle Gilkinet (Ecolo)	Jacqueline Herzet (PRL)	5 seats
