= Dinant-Philippeville (Chamber of Representatives constituency) =

Belgian political subdivision

Dinant-Philippeville was a constituency used to elect members of the Belgian Chamber of Representatives between 1900 and 1991.

== Representatives ==
| Election | Representative (Party) | Representative (Party) | Representative (Party) | Representative (Party) |
| 1900 | Formed from a merger of Dinant and Philippeville | | | |
|---|---|---|---|---|
| 1900 | Albert d'Huart (Catholic) | Georges Cousot (Catholic) | Grégoire Horlait (PS) | Léon Hubert (Catholic) |
| 1904 | Emile Capelle (Liberal) | Georges Cousot (Catholic) | Grégoire Horlait (PS) | Léon Hubert (Catholic) |
| 1908 | Emile Capelle (Liberal) | Albert d'Huart (Catholic) | Grégoire Horlait (PS) | Léon Hubert (Catholic) |
| 1912 | Emile Capelle (Liberal) | Albert d'Huart (Catholic) | Grégoire Horlait (PS) | Valentin Brifaut (Catholic) |
| 1919 | Hector de Selys Longchamps (Liberal) | Georges Cousot (Catholic) | Jean-Baptiste Périquet (PS) | Valentin Brifaut (Catholic) |
| 1921 | Hyacinthe Housiaux (Catholic) | Georges Cousot (Catholic) | Jean-Baptiste Périquet (PS) | Valentin Brifaut (Catholic) |
| 1925 | Hyacinthe Housiaux (Catholic) | Edouard de Pierpont de Rivière (Catholic) | Jean-Baptiste Périquet (PS) | Hector de Selys Longchamps (Liberal) |
| 1929 | Hyacinthe Housiaux (Catholic) | Edouard de Pierpont de Rivière (Catholic) | Jean-Baptiste Périquet (PS) | Denis Henon (PS) |
| 1932 | Hyacinthe Housiaux (Catholic) | Edouard de Pierpont de Rivière (Catholic) | Jules Blavier (PS) | Denis Henon (PS) |
| 1936 | Hyacinthe Housiaux (Catholic) | Adelin Vermer (REX) | Jules Blavier (PS) | Denis Henon (PS) |
| 1939 | Charles d'Aspremont Lynden (Catholic) | Henri Lambotte (Catholic) | Jules Blavier (PS) | Roger Mattot (Liberal) |
| 1946 | Abel Charloteaux (CVP) | Henri Lambotte (Catholic) | Marcel Meunier (BSP) | Roger Rommiée (BSP) |
| 1949 | Abel Charloteaux (CVP) | Henri Lambotte (Catholic) | Mathieu Jacques (CVP) | Roger Rommiée (BSP) |
| 1950 | Abel Charloteaux (CVP) | Henri Lambotte (Catholic) | Mathieu Jacques (CVP) | Roger Rommiée (BSP) |
| 1954 | Auguste Peiffer (BSP) | Henri Lambotte (Catholic) | Mathieu Jacques (CVP) | Florent Mouvet (BSP) |
| 1958 | Albert Grégoire (BSP) | Julien Ernest Allard (CVP) | Mathieu Jacques (CVP) | Victor Barbeaux (CVP) |
| 1961 | Albert Grégoire (BSP) | Julien Ernest Allard (CVP) | Mathieu Jacques (CVP) | Albert Martin (BSP) |
| 1965 | Albert Grégoire (BSP) | Julien Ernest Allard (CVP) | Jean Coulonvaux (PVV) | |
| 1968 | Charles Cornet d'Elzius (PVV) | Antoine Humblet (CVP) | Jean Coulonvaux (PVV) | 3 seats |
| 1971 | Albert Grégoire (PSB) | Augustin Bila (RW) | Victor Barbeaux (cdH) | 3 seats |
| 1974 | Albert Grégoire (PSB) | Augustin Bila (RW) | Victor Barbeaux (cdH) | 3 seats |
| 1977 | Roger Delizée (PSB) | Charles Cornet d'Elzius (PRL) | Emile Wauthy (cdH) | 3 seats |
| 1978 | Roger Delizée (PSB) | Charles Cornet d'Elzius (PRL) | Emile Wauthy (cdH) | 3 seats |
| 1981 | Roger Delizée (PSB) | Charles Cornet d'Elzius (PRL) | Emile Wauthy (cdH) | 3 seats |
| 1985 | Roger Delizée (PSB) | Charles Cornet d'Elzius (PRL) | Michel Lebrun (cdH) | 3 seats |
| 1988 | Roger Delizée (PSB) | Charles Cornet d'Elzius (PRL) | Michel Lebrun (cdH) | 3 seats |
| 1991 | Jean-Marc Delizée (PS) | Guy Saulmont (PRL) | Michel Lebrun (cdH) | 3 seats |
| 1995 | Merged into Namur-Dinant-Philippeville | | | |
