= Communist Party of Belgium (1963) =

Belgian political party

- Founder: Jacques Grippa
- Founded: 1963
- Dissolved: 1976
- Split from: Communist Party of Belgium
- Newspaper: La Voix du Peuple
- Ideology: Anti-revisionism; Maoism; Marxism–Leninism
- Political position: Far-left

The Communist Party of Belgium (CPB; (Note: French: Parti communiste de Belgique; Dutch: Kommunistische Partij van België) also known as the Parti grippiste, 'Grippist Party') was a Belgian anti-revisionist political party founded in 1963 by Jacques Grippa with the support of the Chinese Communist Party (CCP). It was the first Maoist political party in Europe, although it was eventually abandoned by the CCP over disagreements regarding the Cultural Revolution. After losing international support, the party declined and fell to factionalism.

== History ==
The party was formed as a splinter of the Communist Party of Belgium (KPB-PCB) after a schism within the party regarding the Sino-Soviet split. The anti-revisionist faction first emerged within the KPB-PCB in 1962, with Grippa expelled from the party as the faction's leader for promoting a successful anti-Soviet resolution at a local party meeting in Brussels. Following his expulsion, Grippa and his faction established the Communist periodical La Voix du Peuple, whose third issue made clear their aim to organize a new anti-revisionist party. The CPB was thus founded at a national conference in December 1963, its main resolution declaring "the Communist Party of Belgium reconstituted on the national level, on the basis of Marxism–Leninism."

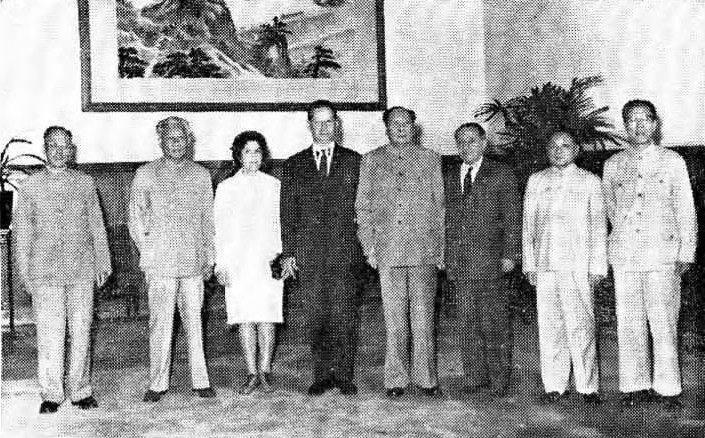
Mao and other CCP officials meeting with delegates from the CPB headed by Grippa in 1964

Grippa had prior contacts with Chinese Communist Party (CCP) officials during his time in the KPB-PCB, having been invited to Beijing in June 1956. He was seen as a promising leader by Kang Sheng for establishing pro-Chinese influence in Belgium, and was personally received in meetings with Liu Shaoqi and Mao Zedong. Although the CPB was initially materially backed by the Chinese government, Grippa maintained that the CPB was independent and eventually came to criticize the official Chinese narrative of the Cultural Revolution. He furthermore condemned the attack on Liu during the revolution, which sparked the "Rittenberg case" after prominent Maoist Sidney Rittenberg censured him in a pamphlet for his defense of Liu. The case soured Grippa's relations with the Chinese government under Mao and the Albanian government under Enver Hoxha. When Grippa returned to Beijing in the summer of 1966, he was scolded by Kang for leading his party too independently from the CCP. Kang ultimately ended Chinese support for the party in September that year, and Grippa was further denied support by Hoxha.

Grippa was subsequently ousted from the CPB by another faction within his party in December 1967, possibly with the involvement of the Albanian government. By early 1968, the Chinese government had transferred their support to the separate Marxist–Leninist Communist Party of Belgium. According to the Marxists Internet Archive, the CPB was dissolved in 1976. The party succumbed to factionalism, spawning other parties which further disintegrated into divided sub-groups.

== Ideology ==
Political scientists have described the Communist Party of Belgium as a Maoist political party with a primarily Belgian Francophone character, situated on the extreme left of the political spectrum. The CPB was the first Maoist party in Europe, being founded in Western Europe as Eastern Europe was under the Soviet sphere of influence. According to Benjamin I. Schwartz, "Grippa (a former Stalinist) [was] committed to the party not only as a moral entity but as a Leninist structure" and he attached great importance to communist party rules and organization as opposed to what Grippa condemned as a "cult or idolatry with regard to a leader". This, according to Schwartz, alienated Grippa's standing within Beijing.

== Election results ==
Election year	Votes		Seats	Change	Ref.
Election year	Number	Percentage	Seats	Change	Ref.
1965	10,590	0.20%	0 / 187	New	
1968	4,947	0.10%	0 / 187	Steady	
1971	2,304	0.04%	0 / 187	Steady	
