= Hector Denis (economist) =

Belgian politician (1842–1913)

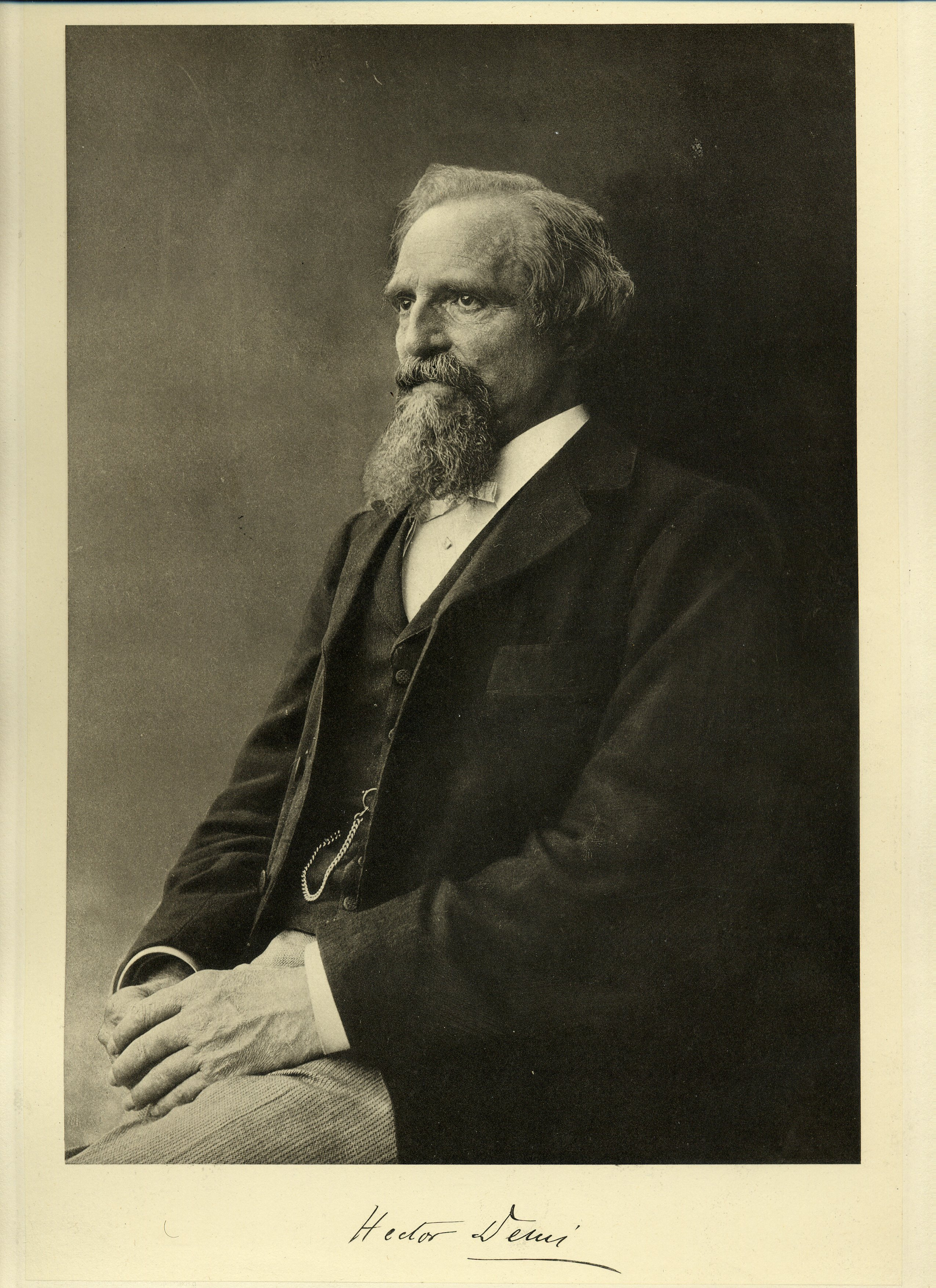

Hector Denis (29 April 1842 – 10 May 1913) was a Belgian politician, economist, sociologist and university professor.

== Life ==
Denis was initially trained as a lawyer but later changed his discipline to political economy and became a lecturer at the Free University of Brussels. In 1879 he was appointed extraordinary professor and in 1886 he became full professor. In 1868 he also obtained a doctorate in natural sciences with Professor Henri-Antoine-Joseph Lambotte (1816-1873) as his promoter. He later testified about the enduring influence Professor Lambotte had on him as student as a devoted educator. In 1892 he was elected rector, becoming the first socialist to hold this position. He resigned from the position of rector after the suspension the controversial anarchist Élisée Reclus who he had invited to give a lecture at the university.

From the beginning of the 20th-century, Denis started to teach sociology at the university, inspired by the positivism of Auguste Comte. In 1897, industrialist Ernest Solvay entrusted him with the task, together with Guillaume De Greef and Emile Vandervelde, to establish the Institute of Social Sciences, which the three socialists would lead until 1902.

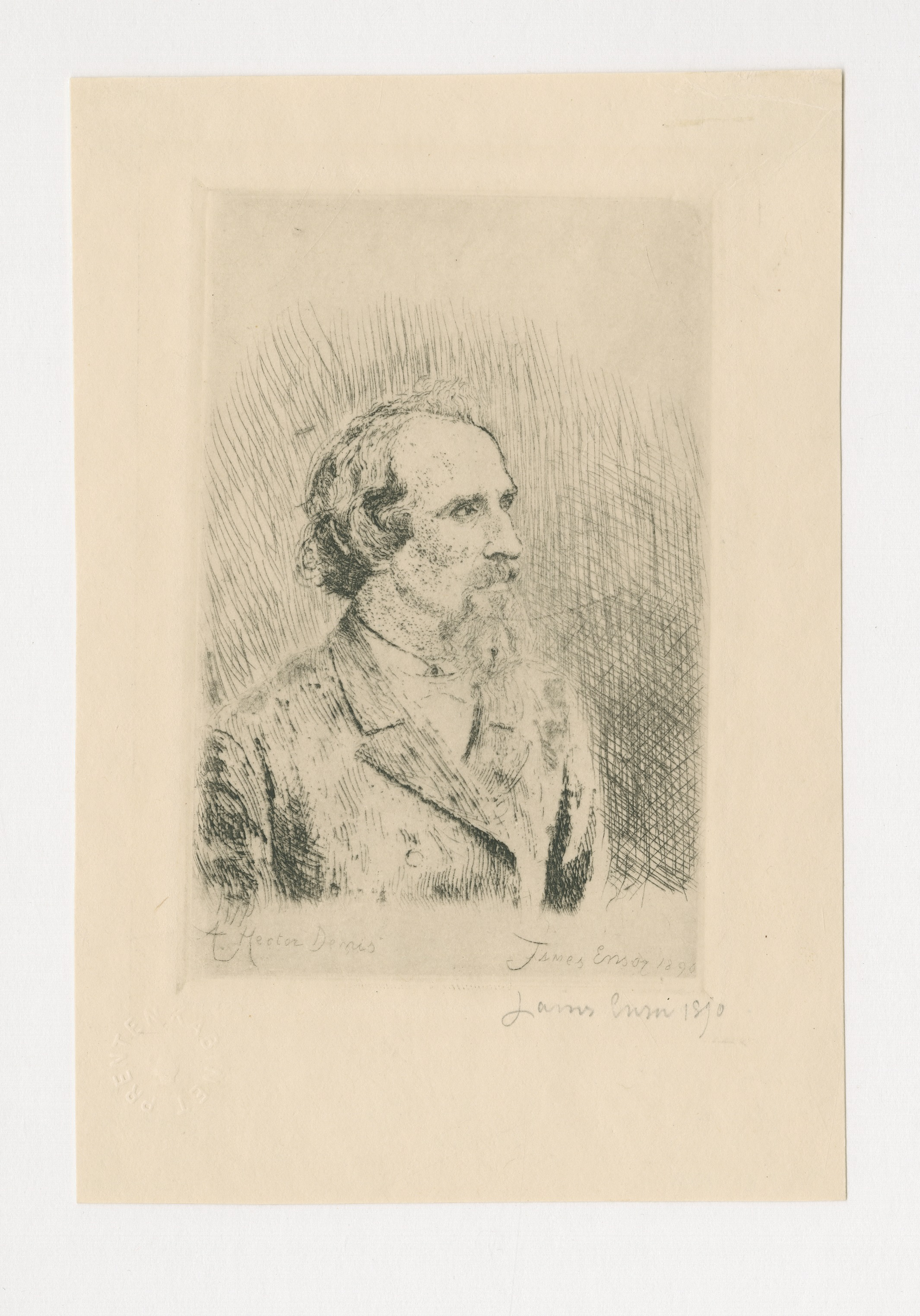
Portrait of Hector Denis by James Ensor

Universal plural voting was established in Belgium in 1893, through a political alliance between the organized working class and a progressive liberal-oriented middle class won over by a democratization of the political system and firm social measures, and linked by a radical anti-clericalism. This enabled the socialist Belgian Labour Party to build parliamentary representation and in the elections of October 1894, 28 socialist people's representatives were elected. Denis himself also decided to get involved in politics and was chosen from a cartel list of six socialists and five radical liberals in the district of Liège and would remain in the House until his death in May 1913.

Denis who was an active member of the parliament spoke out for the nationalization of the mines in the form of a cooperativerun by the miners themselves and was an advocate of women's suffrage and was one of the founders of the Belgian League for the Rights of Women. He also strongly criticized the appropriation of land by the Congo Free State authorities and the exploitation of the local population, but did not question the takeover of the Congo Free State by the Belgian state in 1908. As a member of the freethinkers movement, he also strove for a complete secularization of education.

== Works ==
- L'impôt, Brussel, 1889.
- L'organisation du suffrage universel, Brussel, 1892.
- La dépression économique et sociale et l'histoire des prix, Brussel, 1897.
- Histoire des systèmes économiques et socialistes, Brussel, 1897.
