= Marxist–Leninist Communist Party of Belgium =

Political party in Belgium (1967–1989)

The Communist Party (Marxist-Leninist) of Belgium (French: Parti Communiste (marxiste-léniniste) de Belgique, abbreviated P.C.(M.L.)B.) was a political party in Belgium.

== Foundation ==
P.C.(M.L.)B. was founded on 19 November 1967 at a national conference in La Louvière. 117 persons took part in the founding conference. Key leaders of the new party included Joseph Vanderlinden (Administrative Secretary of the Central Committee), Michel Graindorge, Henri Glineur, Fernand Lefebvre, Emile Remy and Xavier Relecom. The founders of the P.C.(M.L.)B. had broken away from the Communist Party of Belgium of Jacques Grippa (itself a splinter group of the main Communist Party of Belgium or P.C.B.), as they accused Grippa of having sided with the 'Chinese Khruschtev' Liu Shaoqi. The party was the largest of the splinter groups of Grippa's party.

P.C.(M.L.)B. started its own youth and students organizations. The party had around 130-150 members, concentrated in Centre, Borinage and Brussels.

== Mergers and splits ==
The party was the sole Belgian party to receive recognition from the Chinese Communist Party. As such it managed to amalgamate a number of other factions. In 1968 the Borain Communist Movement merged into P.C.(M.L.)B.. This group had emerged from a split in the P.C.B. in Pâturages and held 3 seats in the municipal council. The Pâturages group was led by Raoul Danhier.

A party cadre conference held on 28 June 1970 the name of the party was changed to the Marxist–Leninist Communist Party of Belgium (Parti communiste marxiste-léniniste de Belgique, abbreviated P.C.M.L.B.). Fernand Lefebvre was named second secretary of the party. The party was active within the 'Centre de diffusion et de documentation pour le Vietnam' and 'Comité national Palestine'.

Whilst P.C.M.L.B. called for blank vote in the 1970 municipal election, the party did allow the Pâturages branch to present a local list. The list won 3 seats in the municipal council.

In 1971 Lefebvre was elevated as the sole leader of the party. His exact title varied over the years, from Party Spokesperson, Central Committee Chairman to Central Committee Secretary.

In 1972 the 'Red Guard' faction, a spontanist group in Liège that had split away from P.C.(M.L.)B., reunited with the party. This group was led by Mazurkevitch Sarlet, Édouard Sarlet and Jean Derkenne. In the same year the Communist Party of Belgium (Marxist-Leninist) (P.C.B.(m.-l.) of Arnold Hauwaert began dialogue on unity with P.C.M.L.B.. The two parties merged on 9 June 1973. The publications of the two parties merged, now being published as Clarté et L'Exploité. Nevertheless, former P.C.B.(m.-l.) members broke away in 1976 and founded the Revolutionary Communist Party (Parti Communiste Revolutionnaire; P.C.R.), a Maoist-oriented communist party. PCR published L’Exploité (The Exploited). In 1982 PCR signed a manifest for “an independent, progressive and democratic Wallonia” together with PCBML and Pour le Socialisme..

In 1978 or 1979 the Communist Struggle (Marxist-Leninist) faction merged into P.C.M.L.B. That group emerged from the students movement in Liège in 1972. It published the magazine Lutte Communiste. In December 1978 it merged with the Marxist-Leninist Communist Party of Belgium, but by that time most of its members had deserted.

In January 1979 Clarté et l'Exploité was transformed into the bimonthly La Voix Communiste.

== Later years ==
By the early 1980s, the party had declined in influence, having merely a few dozen members. The party supported independence for the Wallon and Flemish peoples. In 1982 P.C.M.L.B. contested the municipal election. In Mons Fernand Lefebvre stood as a candidate on the 'Union démocratique et progressiste wallonne' list, along with candidates from P.C.B. and others.

In 1986 P.C.M.L.B. mutated into the Communist Party of Progressive Unity (Parti Communiste d'Unité Progressiste, P.C.U.P.). P.C.U.P. was disbanded after the Tiananmen square events in June 1989.

== Publications ==
P.C.(M.L.)B./P.C.M.L.B. published Clarté ('Clarity', weekly), Clarté et L'Exploité ('Clarity and the Exploited') and later La Voix communiste ('The Communist Voice') in French language and in Flemish language Klaarheid ('Clarity'), Vlaanderen Rood ('Red Flanders'), De Rode Waarheid ('The Red Truth') and De Kommunistische Stem ('The Communist Voice').
