= Jules Colbeau =

Belgian naturalist (1823–1881)

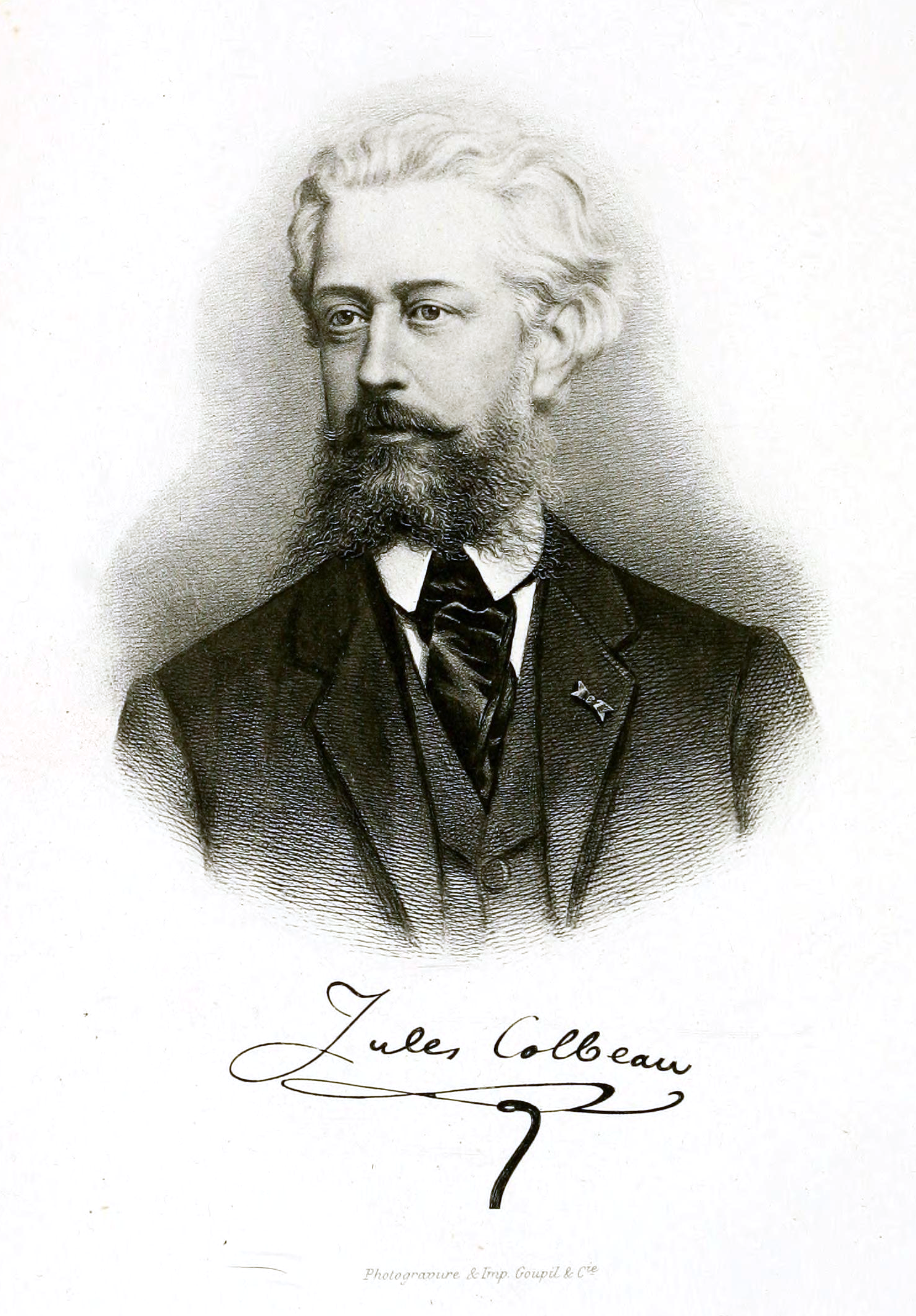
Engraving based on a photograph taken in 1872

Jules Alexandre Joseph Colbeau (1 July 1823 – 11 April 1881) was a Belgian naturalist and founder of the Malacological Society of Belgium (Société Malacologique de Belgique) which later became the zoological society. Colbeau was also involved in bringing together several scientific societies in Belgium under the federation of scientific studies. He was a mentor for the naturalist and artist François Roffiaen.

== Life and work ==
Colbeau was born in Namur where his father Alexandre-Joseph was an established merchant and municipal councilor while his mother Julie-Joséphine Grandgagnage was the sister of Joseph Grandgagnage (1797–1877). He went to study humanities at the Namur Athenaeum in 1835. He began to collect shells, butterflies, beetles and coins from an early age. He also studied music along with his brother Émile, following his mother's wishes, and took private lessons in art from F. Lambert. He went to study law at the University of Louvain and the family moved there. He made friends with the Louvain entomologists Charles Defré and Auguste Tennstedt who specialized in lepidoptera and beetles leading to his taking up an interest in the molluscs. His mother died in 1843 and his father died in 1857. Shortly after the death of his father, his brother Émile went on a journey to Germany, Italy and Greece and died in Rome. After this Colbeau increasingly spent time on natural history studies and moved to live in Brussels where he married. He was a founding member of the Entomological Society of Belgium in 1855. In 1861-62 he wrote to his friend that the entomological society was well established and no longer needed him and that a new society for the study of molluscs was needed. He noted that it was particularly important for the work of geologists to work out the layers of the earth. He then became the initiator and founder of the Malacological Society of Belgium in 1863 along with Henri Lambotte, Égide Fologne and Jules De la Fontaine. He served as its secretary until his death. In 1866 a joint exhibition of the Entomological and Malacological Society was held in the zoo. This led to a formation of the federation of scientific studies. It became a royal society in 1881 after the society held an exhibition as part of the National Exhibition of 1880, during the 50th anniversary of Belgian independence. Colbeau published several short notes on new species of molluscs in the region and in 1865 he wrote about the mollusc fauna of Belgium and considered a classification of the biogeographical regions based on the mollusc species compositions and the works of d'Omalius and Edmond de Selys-Longchamps. Shortly after the exhibition of 1880 Colbeau suffered from cancer of the tongue. In March 1881 he was made Knight of the Order of Leopold. Colbeau introduced the artist François Roffiaen (1820-1898) to natural history. Colbeau's collections of shells went to Roffiaen and they are now in the Royal Museum of Natural History.
