= Joseph Jacquemotte =

Belgian Communist politician

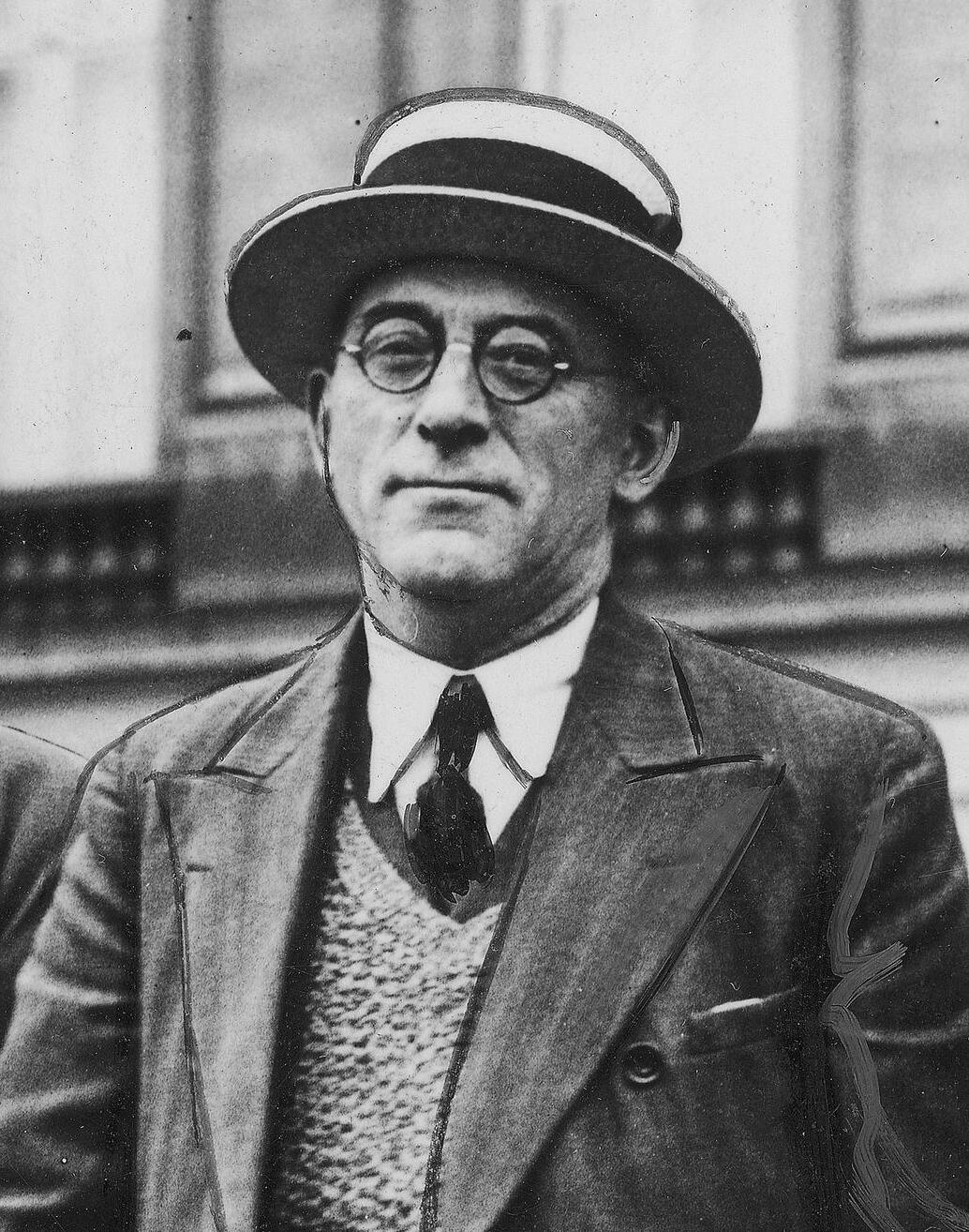
- Joseph Jacquemotte in May 1936

General Secretary of the Communist Party of Belgium
- In office 1934–1936

Member of the Chamber of Representatives
- In office 1925–1936

Molenbeek-Saint-Jean Municipal Councilor
- In office 1921–1924

Personal details
- Born: April 22, 1883 Brussels, Belgium
- Died: October 11, 1936 (aged 53) Brussels, Belgium
- Resting place: Saint-Gilles Cemetery, Brussels
- Party: Communist Party of Belgium; Belgian Labour Party (1906–1921)
- Occupation: Politician, journalist
- Known for: Founding member of the Communist Party of Belgium

Military service
- Allegiance: Belgium
- Branch/service: Belgian Army
- Rank: Corporal

Joseph Jacquemotte (French pronunciation: [ʒozɛf ʒakmɔt]; 22 April 1883 – 11 October 1936) was a Belgian anarcho-syndicalist and later communist activist who was a founding member and leader of the Communist Party of Belgium (KBP-PCB). He was the creator and editor of the newspapers L'Exploité (1911–1914 and 1918–1921), Le Drapeau rouge (1921–1936) and La Voix du Peuple (1936).

== Biography ==
Born in to a family of a non-commissioned officer of working-class origin in Brussels, in 1899 he graduated from the cadet school and served in the army for some time. Under the influence of his brother, he joined the Brussels cell of the Belgian Labour Party (BWP), of which he was a member in 1906–1921.

Appointed regional secretary of the Committee of the Union of Workers (Socialists), from 1910 to 1914 Jacquemotte led a number of strikes, including the first strike of employees in Belgium. He led the revolutionary syndicalist opposition in the reformist trade unions, seeking to rebuild it along the lines of the General Confederation of Labor in France.

Being member of the Bureau of the General Council of the BWP, he headed the left wing of the party, the internationalist group Amis d'exploité ("Friends of the Exploited"), formed in order to support the leftist weekly L'Exploité ("The Exploited").

In February 1921, Jacquemotte voted to join the Communist International and was expelled from the PWP. In September, together with War van Overstraten and other revolutionary leaders, he formed the basis for the creation of the Communist Party of Belgium (CPB), in which Jacquemotte was elected a member of the Central Committee. At the same time, he was the editor of the party organ Le Drapeau rouge ("The Red Flag"), a member of the International Secretariat of the International Red Aid and the Executive Committee of the Communist International from 1924.

His popularity, gained by working in trade unions, allowed him to be elected in 1925 at the same time as a municipal deputy in Molenbeek-Saint-Jean and a deputy of parliament from Brussels, which guaranteed him parliamentary immunity. Jacquemotte, in contrast to the Trotskyist theses of van Overstraten, was guided by the Comintern and the pro-Soviet course. In March 1928, Jacquemotte, among the majority, expelled Van Overstraten's supporters from the party.

A member of the Politburo of the Central Committee of the CPB from 1931, Jacquemotte played an important role in the major strikes of 1932, which brought the CPB an electoral breakthrough in the general election of that year, as a result of which Jacquemotte joined the communist deputies Julien Lahaut and Henri Glinier in the lower house. In 1934, Jacquemotte officially became the first general secretary of the CPB. In the spring of 1936, after another major strike, the CPB reached its first peak of popularity.

Jacquemotte, in his post, defended the unity of action between the communists and the socialists and other progressive forces, even to the point that he raised the issue of the collective entry of the CPB into the Belgian Labor Party in order to create a "formidable and cohesive bloc of the main currents of the working class". He died suddenly in October 1936, while on a train taking him back to Brussels from the printers of La Voix du Peuple, the party's daily newspaper that became the successor to L'Exploité.

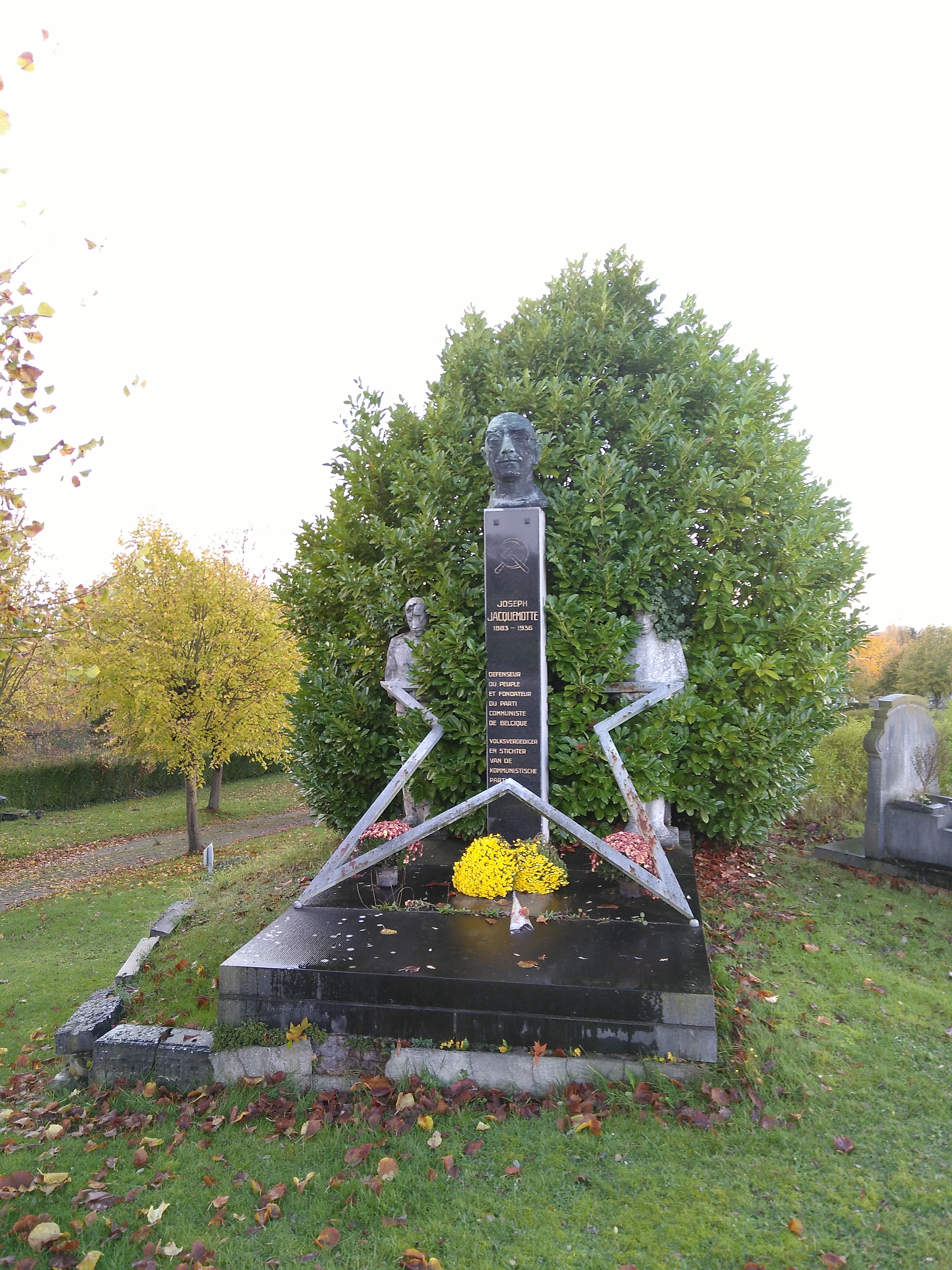
Grave of Joseph Jacquemotte at the Saint-Gilles Cemetery

His monumental grave is in the cemetery of Saint-Gilles.
