= Mathilde Boniface =

Belgian politician

Member of the Walloon Regional Council
- In office 23 December 1981 – 3 September 1985

Member of the Chamber of Representatives
- In office 27 November 1981 – 3 September 1985
- Constituency: Nivelles

Personal details
- Born: 20 December 1911 Mons, Belgium
- Died: 23 February 1986 (aged 74) Ottignies, Belgium
- Party: Walloon Rally
- Education: Université libre de Bruxelles

Mathilde Boniface (née Delobe; 20 December 1911 – 23 February 1986) was a Belgian politician and an activist in the Walloon Movement. She was a member of the Chamber of Representatives and the Walloon Regional Council from 1981 to 1985, and a founder and member of the Walloon Rally.

== Early life ==
Boniface was born on 20 December 1911 in Mons. She graduated from the Université libre de Bruxelles with a degree in mathematics, one of the few women at the university at the time. She also received a diploma in physiotherapy and after World War II, she began working as a physiotherapist in Bierges. She was an activist with the Communist Youth of Belgium and the Young Socialist Guards. While in Bierges, she joined the Wallonie Libre and became increasingly aware of the economic problems in Wallonia.

== Political career ==
Boniface was a member of the Walloon Party, which she joined in 1966, but left the party in 1968 when she helped to found the Walloon Rally (RW). She was elected as a municipal councillor of Bierges in 1971, a position she held until 1976. After the merger with Wavre, she became a municipal councillor in the new city from 1977 until her death in 1986. From 1977 to 1982, Boniface was alderman of the town. She was in charge of culture in the city during these years and created the Cultural and Artistic Circle of Wavre in December 1981. She was a delegate for the promotion of the province of Walloon Brabant. She became vice-president of the women's committee of the RW in 1973, which was chaired by Aimee Bologne-Lemaire.

In the 1981 general election, Boniface was elected as a member of the Chamber of Representatives for the constituency of Nivelles. She served from 27 November 1981 until 3 September 1985. Along with Henri Mordant, who was elected in Liège, they were the only elected representatives of the RW in the Chamber. Prior to the 1981 elections, the Walloon Popular Rally (RPW) split from the party because the faction did not agree with the partnership with the Democratic Front of Francophones (FDF). As a result, she automatically sat in the Walloon Regional Council from 23 December 1981 to 3 September 1985, where she served as the group leader of the RW from 1982 to 1985. She chaired a joint group with members of the Ecolo and the Communist Party of Belgium.

== Later life ==
Boniface died in Ottignies on 23 February 1986. A foundation was created in her name.
