= Jacques Grippa =

Belgian politician (1913–1990)

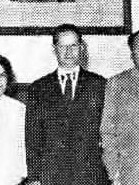
- Grippa in 1964
- Born: March 30, 1913; Grivegnée, Liége, Belgium
- Died: August 30, 1990 (aged 77); Forest, Belgium
- Education: University of Liège
- Occupations: Politician, member of the resistance during World War II and communist
- Parents: Jean Grippa (father); Stéphanie Becco (mother)

Jacques Grippa (March 30, 1913– August 30, 1990) was a Belgian politician, member of the resistance during World War II and communist.

== Biography ==
Grippa was the son of the Italian immigrant Jean Grippa (1886–1945) and the Belgian woman Stéphanie Becco (1888–1935). In 1930, he studied engineering at the University of Liège and became a member of the Belgian Communist Party.

During World War II, Grippa was a member of the resistance. In 1943, he was imprisoned as a political prisoner at Fort Breendonk. He was tortured, but refused to betray anybody and was therefore sent to Buchenwald.

After the war, he became head of cabinet at the ministry of War Victims, where he oversaw the treatment of political prisoners. He was also chief of cabinet for Jean Borremans, who worked for the Communist Minister of Civil Works.

In 1962, he was removed from the Belgian Communist Party because he was more endeared to Maoism. Together with fellow former members, he founded a new party of the same name, but which quickly faded out after only a few years.

In 1964, as Secretary of the Central Committee of the Communist Party of Belgium, he visited China, delivering a speech at the Central Party School of the Chinese Communist Party.

Grippa was married to the communist militant Magdeleine Chapellier (1914 - 21 August 2009), and together they had three children. She followed him in his opinion, and when they travelled to Beijing, they were greeted with warmth by Mao Zedong. She remained loyal to successive Maoist parties and splinter groups in Belgium.

== Publications ==
- 1967 Structural Reforms: A Neo-Reformist Mystification
