= Marc Drumaux =

Belgian politician (1922–1972)

Marc Élie Joseph Drumaux
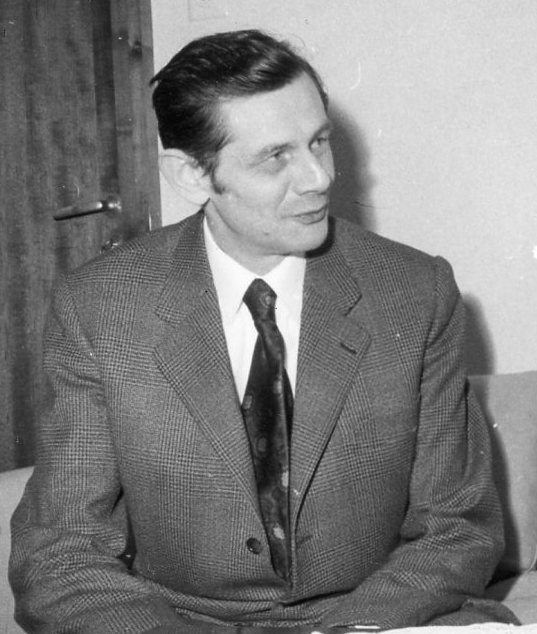

Chairman of the Communist Party of Belgium
- In office 1968–1972
- Preceded by: Ernest Burnelle
- Succeeded by: Louis Van Geyt

Member of the Chamber of Representatives
- In office 1961–1972

Personal details
- Born: 10 May 1922 Ath, Belgium
- Died: 15 November 1972 (aged 50) Uccle, Belgium
- Party: Communist Party of Belgium
- Occupation: Politician

Marc Drumaux (10 May 1922 – 15 November 1972) was a member of the Belgian Resistance, a leader of the Communist Party of Belgium (CPB) and a member of the Belgian federal parliament.

== Youth ==
Born into a large family of railway workers, after leaving school in 1941 he started working in the railways. He became an underground member of the Communist Party in 1942 and subsequently took part in the distribution of Resistance publications and armed actions during the Nazi occupation.

== Activist in the CPB ==
From the liberation of Belgium until 1959, Drumaux was a member of the Party Secretariat Committee for the Tournai region. In 1957 he became a member of the Central Committee and from April 1960 was a member of the party's politburo. From 1963 to 1965, he was also a member of the CPB Central Committee Secretariat. In December 1966, he was nominated to be Vice-President of the Party and President of the Walloon (French-speaking) wing of the Party. In September 1968, he succeeded Ernest Burnelle to become President of the CPB.

== Federal Parliament ==
In 1961, Drumaux was elected as a deputy to the Chamber of Representatives of the Federal Parliament for the electorate of Mons-Borinage. From 1965 to 1968 he was leader of the parliamentary communist group. He remained a member of parliament until his sudden death in 1972, when he was replaced by Noëlla Dinant.
