= Philippeville (Chamber of Representatives constituency) =

Belgian political subdivision

Philippeville was a constituency used to elect members of the Belgian Chamber of Representatives between 1831 and 1900.

== Representatives ==
Election	Representative (Party)	Representative (Party)
1831	Pierre Seron (Liberal)	1 seat
1833	Pierre Seron (Liberal)	1 seat
1837	Georges de Baillet Latour (Liberal)	1 seat
1841	Georges de Baillet Latour (Liberal)	1 seat
1845	Georges de Baillet Latour (Liberal)	1 seat
1848	Georges de Baillet Latour (Liberal)	1 seat
1852	Georges de Baillet Latour (Liberal)	1 seat
1856	Georges de Baillet Latour (Liberal)	1 seat
1857	Georges de Baillet Latour (Liberal)	1 seat
1861	Georges de Baillet Latour (Liberal)	1 seat
1864	Georges de Baillet Latour (Liberal)	Edouard Lambert (Liberal)
1868	Georges de Baillet Latour (Liberal)	Edouard Lambert (Liberal)
1870	Georges de Baillet Latour (Liberal)	Stéphane Mineur (Liberal)
1874	Georges de Baillet Latour (Liberal)	Stéphane Mineur (Liberal)
1878	Georges de Baillet Latour (Liberal)	Stéphane Mineur (Liberal)
1882	Joseph de Riquet de Caraman Chimay (Catholic)	Louis de Baré de Comogne (Catholic)
1886	Joseph de Riquet de Caraman Chimay (Catholic)	Louis de Baré de Comogne (Catholic)
1890	Joseph de Riquet de Caraman Chimay (Catholic)	Louis de Baré de Comogne (Catholic)
1892	Joseph de Riquet de Caraman Chimay (Catholic)	Louis de Baré de Comogne (Catholic)
1894	Charles Mincé du Fontbaré (Catholic)	Léon Hubert (Catholic)
1898	Charles Mincé du Fontbaré (Catholic)	Léon Hubert (Catholic)
1900	Merged into Dinant-Philippeville	
