= Ernest Burnelle =

Belgian politician (1908–1968)

Chairman of the Communist Party of Belgium
- In office 1954–1968
- Succeeded by: Marc Drumaux

Member of the Chamber of Representatives
- In office 1965–1968
- In office 1946–1949

Personal details
- Born: July 12, 1908 Liège, Belgium
- Died: August 5, 1968 (aged 60) Liège, Belgium
- Party: Communist Party of Belgium

Ernest Burnelle (12 July 1908 – 5 August 1968) was a Belgian politician, member of the Communist Party of Belgium (PCB), and part of the Walloon Movement.

The son of a worker who was an anarchist, Burnelle was first a teacher and then a conscientious scientific regent in Nivelles and Liège. He met Théo Dejace, who educated him on the subject of trade union action. He was secretary of the Central Liege Socialist Teachers and, in the 1960s, was part of the union Common Front in Liège.

After the outbreak of the Second World War, Burnelle joined the Resistance. He participated in the Battle of Belgium but escaped captivity (under the Flamenpolitik, the Germans decided to release all soldiers who passed a language test in Dutch). He was part of the Walloon Front for the Liberation of the country. He participated in the underground press, and became a companion of Julien Lahaut. He narrowly escaped arrest by the Germans, who imprisoned his father. He was a permanent member of the PCB underground and continued its struggle in the Borinage then in the region of Charleroi.

He was considered an anti-Stalinist in the line of René Beelen and became secretary of the Communist Party of Belgium in 1954 and its president in 1963. He was secretary of the Liège federation of PCB from 1946 to 1947, was responsible for the national party from 1947 to 1948, and the editor of Le Drapeau rouge from 1949 to 1950 during the Royal Question. From 1946 to 1949, he was an MP for Liège and supported the proposed bill to amend the Constitution filed by Marcel-Hubert Grégoire on behalf of the Walloon National Congress of 1945, confirmed by the Second Walloon National Congress.

He spoke at the Third Walloon National Congress of Brussels in 1948, where he said he was committed to propagate the idea of federalism in the masses. He entered the Walloon Popular Movement created after the Belgian general strike of 1960-61, was re-elected MP for Liège 1965 to 1968, and was again elected that year, but at a meeting organized jointly with the Belgian Socialist Party, the Walloon Popular Movement and the General Federation of Belgian Labour, he suffered a brain hemorrhage. He was replaced as head of the PCB by Marc Drumaux and in the House by Marcel Levaux which he also engaged in the Walloon movement, including Wallonia Region of Europe.

== Bibliography ==
- Encyclopédie du Mouvement wallon, Tome I, p. 216. Ernest Burnelle notice biographique par Jules Pirlot http://carcob.eu
