= Communist Party of Belgium (1989) =

Communist Party of Belgium Parti Communiste de Belgique Communistische Partij van België
- General Secretary: Arne Baillière
- Founded: 1989
- Headquarters: 4 rue Rouppe Bruxelles Belgique 1000
- Newspaper: Le Drapeau Rouge; Mouvements
- Ideology: Communism; Marxism–Leninism; Hard Euroscepticism
- Political position: Far-left
- International affiliation: IMCWP; World Anti-Imperialist Platform
- Colours: Red

Website
- www.particommuniste.be

The Communist Party of Belgium (French: Parti Communiste de Belgique, pronounced [paʁti kɔmynist də bɛlʒik], abbr. PCB) is a Marxist-Leninist party in Belgium. It was founded in Wallonia in 1989 as the Communist Party of Wallonia-Brussels (French: Parti communiste Wallonie-Bruxelles [paʁti kɔmynist walɔni bʁysɛl]) after the original Communist Party of Belgium was bifurcated along linguistic lines, and refounded as the PCB following the extinction of its counterpart in Flanders. Pierre Beauvois was the General Secretary of the party to 2006.

PC publishes Le Drapeau Rouge and Mouvements. It was part of the Party of the European Left until July 2018.
