= 1971 Belgian general election =

← 1968	7 November 1971	1974 →

All 212 seats in the Chamber of Representatives

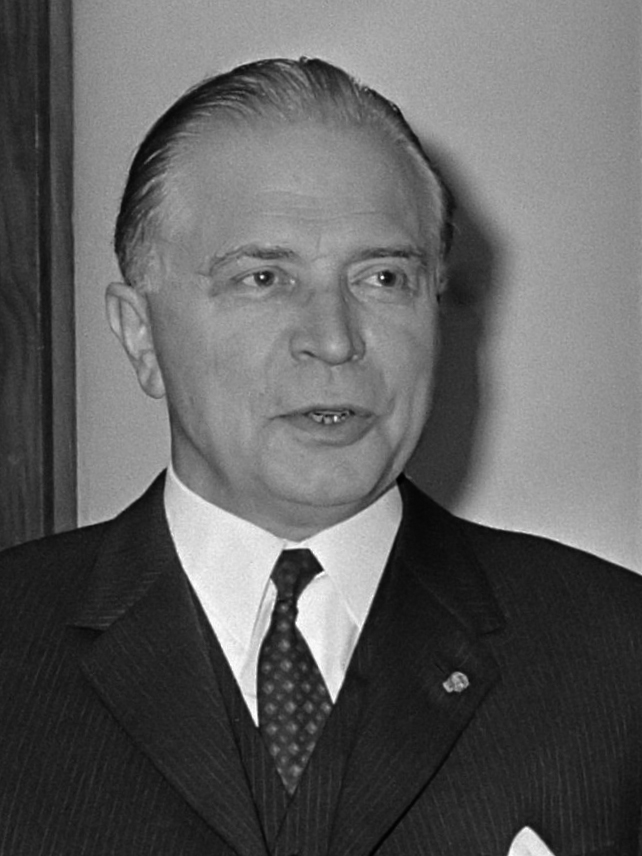

	First party	Second party	Third party
Leader	Jos Van Eynde; Edmond Leburton	Gaston Eyskens	Pierre Descamps
Party	Socialist	CVP	PVV-PLP
Last election	27.10%, 59 seats	–	20.87%, 47 seats
Seats won	57	40	34
Seat change	▼2	New	▼13
Popular vote	1,335,730	967,701	865,655
Percentage	25.29%	18.32%	16.39%
Swing	▼1.81pp	New	▼4.48pp
	Fourth party	Fifth party
Leader	Frans Van der Elst	Robert J. Houben
Party	VU	PSC
Last election	9.79%, 20 seats	–
Seats won	21	15
Seat change	▲1	New
Popular vote	586,917	327,393
Percentage	11.11%	6.20%
Swing	▲1.32pp	New
- Results by constituency for the Chamber of Representatives
Government before election
G. Eyskens V
CVP-PSC-BSP/PSB
Government after election
G. Eyskens V
CVP-PSC-BSP/PSB

General elections were held in Belgium on 7 November 1971. The result was a victory for the Christian People's Party, which won 40 of the 212 seats in the Chamber of Representatives and 34 of the 106 seats in the Senate. Voter turnout was 91.5%. Elections to the nine provincial councils were also held.

The linguistic issues led to the splitting of the major parties into separate Flemish and Francophone parties. Consequently the election returned a very fragmented parliament.

The election followed the first state reform, with the creation of three cultural communities. The newly elected members of parliament would thus also serve in the newly established cultural councils.

== Results ==
=== Chamber of Representatives ===
Party	Votes	%	Seats	+/–
Belgian Socialist Party	1,335,730	25.29	57	–2
Christian People's Party	967,701	18.32	40	New
Party for Freedom and Progress	865,655	16.39	34	–13
People's Union	586,917	11.11	21	+1
Christian Social Party	327,393	6.20	15	New
Walloon Rally	306,606	5.81	12	+6
PSC–CVP	292,101	5.53	12	−57
FDF–Walloon Rally	286,639	5.43	12	New
Communist Party	161,517	3.06	5	0
Red Lions	104,040	1.97	4	+4
Independent Liberal Party	21,919	0.42	0	New
Independent Christians	7,801	0.15	0	New
Liberal Flemish People's Party	2,740	0.05	0	New
Trotskyists	2,660	0.05	0	0
Kaganovemus	2,580	0.05	0	New
Van Meerhage	2,004	0.04	0	New
Z Kleur	1,547	0.03	0	0
Democratic and Progressive Union	1,534	0.03	0	New
Francophone Party	1,471	0.03	0	New
New Party	899	0.02	0	New
U Verbruik	640	0.01	0	New
Dieferenbes	633	0.01	0	0
De Keyzer	565	0.01	0	New
R D Wal	339	0.01	0	New
Total	5,281,631	100.00	212	0
Valid votes	5,281,631	91.99		
Invalid/blank votes	459,637	8.01		
Total votes	5,741,268	100.00		
Registered voters/turnout	6,271,240	91.55		
Source: Belgian Elections

=== Senate ===
Party	Votes	%	Seats	+/–
CVP–PSC	1,547,853	29.70	34	+5
Belgian Socialist Party	1,326,242	25.45	24	–9
Party for Freedom and Progress	776,514	14.90	15	−7
FDF–Walloon Rally	598,768	11.49	6	+1
People's Union	592,509	11.37	12	+3
Communist Party of Belgium	106,799	2.05	1	−1
BSP–Red Lions	97,371	1.87	0	New
Liberal Democrat and Pluralist Party	81,133	1.56	2	New
Democratic and Progressive Union	61,616	1.18	0	New
Independent Liberal Party	15,138	0.29	0	New
Kaganovemus	3,800	0.07	0	0
Liberal Flemish People's Party	3,159	0.06	0	New
Valentyn	513	0.01	0	New
Total	5,211,415	100.00	94	0
Valid votes	5,211,415	92.62		
Invalid/blank votes	415,246	7.38		
Total votes	5,626,661	100.00		
Registered voters/turnout	6,271,240	89.72		
Source: Belgian Elections
