= Louis Van Geyt =

Belgian politician (1927–2016)

Chairman of the Communist Party of Belgium
- In office 1972–1989
- Preceded by: Marc Drumaux
- Succeeded by: position abolished

Member of the Chamber of Representatives
- In office 1971–1981

Member of Flemish Parliament
- In office 1971–1981

Personal details
- Born: 24 September 1927 Antwerp, Belgium
- Died: 15 April 2016 (aged 88)
- Party: Communist Party of Belgium
- Education: Université libre de Bruxelles
- Occupation: Politician

Louis Van Geyt (24 September 1927 – 15 April 2016) was a Belgian politician.

Van Geyt was the last chairman of the Communist Party of Belgium, from 1972 to 1989. He was also the last MP of the party representing Brussels-Halle-Vilvoorde, from 1971 till the 1981 elections, and the last communist municipal councillor in the Brussels region (in the municipality of Brussels), till the 1982 elections.

== Sources ==
- A. Meynen, Van Praag 1948 tot Vilvoorde 1954: politiek-biografische gesprekken met Louis Van Geyt, Brussels, IMAVO-DACOB, 2001
