= François Roffiaen =

Belgian painter

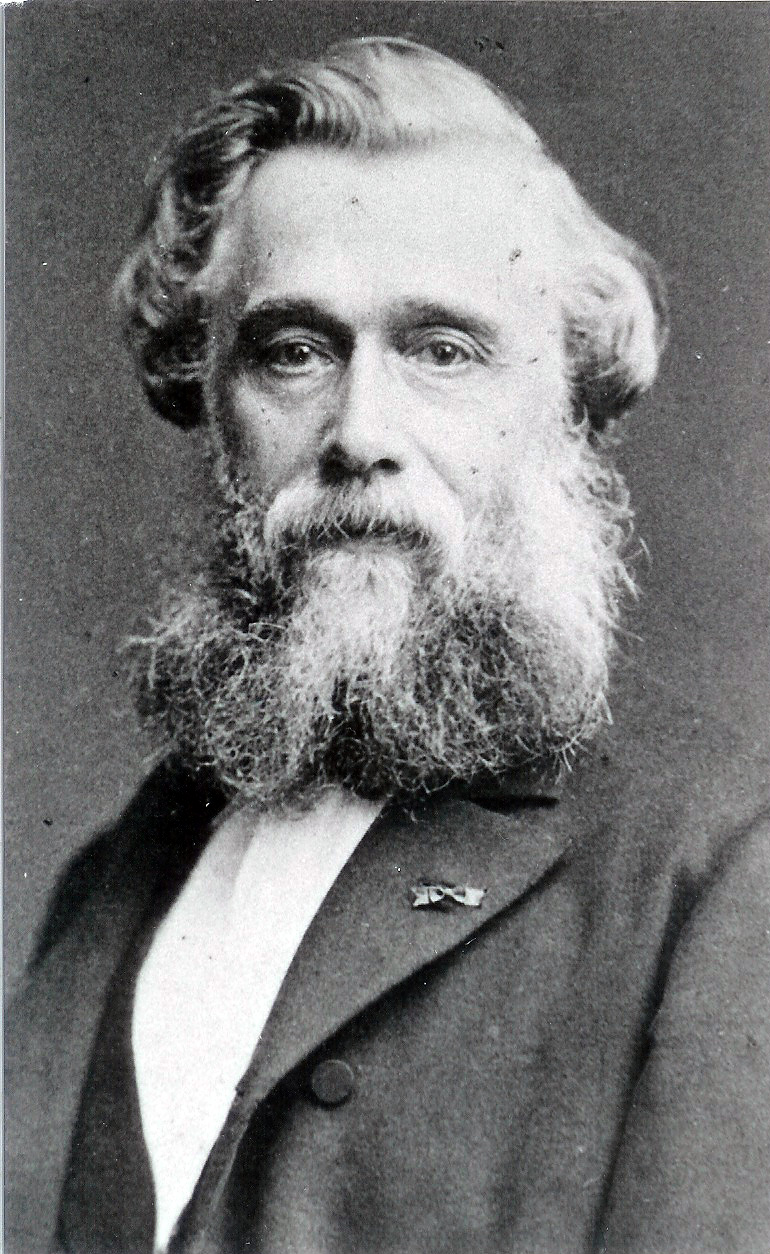
- François Roffiaen (Dechamps & Co., ca 1880)
- Born: Jean François Xavier Roffiaen; 9 August 1820; Ypres, West Flanders, United Kingdom of the Netherlands
- Died: 25 January 1898 (aged 77); Ixelles, Belgium
- Occupation: Painter
- Parent(s): Jean Francois and Victoire Félicité
- Relatives: Joseph-Louis-Augustin (uncle)

Jean François Xavier Roffiaen (9 August 1820 – 25 January 1898) was a Belgian landscape painter who specialised in painting Alpine landscapes.

== Early life and education ==
Roffiaen was born on 9 August 1820 in Ypres, West Flanders. His father's family came from modest origins. The men were day labourers, builders, innkeepers or saddlers and the women were dressmakers or lace makers. Jean Francois, his father (1794–1837) was an upholsterer and his mother, Victoire Félicité (1789–1870), was the daughter of a tradesman from Aire-sur-la Lys (France).

François Roffiaen was barely three years old, when for unknown reasons he went to live with his paternal uncle, Joseph-Louis-Augustin, who was a bookseller in the rue de l’Ange in Namur, the city where he spent, as he himself noted "the most beautiful years of his existence" and where he frequented the Atheneum, as well as the Academy of Painting (1835–1839) under the direction of Ferninand Marinus (1808–1890). Among his fellow students were Louis Bonet (1822–1894), Jean Baptiste Kindermans (1821–1876) and Joseph Quinaux (1822–1895).

He followed his artistic studies at the Academy of Brussels (1839–1842), notably under the famous vedutiste, François Bossuet (1789–1889) who was responsible for teaching him perspective and who was the authority on landscapes and city views. Then he attended the Brussels studio of Pierre-Louis Kühnen (1812–1877), a painter originating from Aix-la-Chapelle, specialised in painting romantic landscapes. Roffiaen received for that reason an annual subsidy of 600 francs, paid by the city of Ypres (1841–1845 or 1846). At the same time, he taught drawing at the college of Dinant.

== Career ==
One of the artist's favourite themes is the representation of Alpine landscapes. Deeply impressed by the canvases Alexandre Calame (1810 –1864) had sent to Belgian Salons, François Roffiaen indeed won a place at Geneva in the autumn of 1846 and stayed for six months beside this master, before discovering the mountains himself. He continued to familiarise himself with the landscapes of Switzerland, Austria, Upper Bavaria and the Haute-Savoie during several other journeys (1852, 1855, 1856, 1864, 1868, 1879). But the painter also liked to represent picturesque scenes of the valleys of the Meuse and the Ourthe, the Scottish lochs, discovered in 1862, or the extensive heather of Limbourg, which he travelled through from the middle of the preceding decade, so that like Edmond Tschaggeny (1818–1873), he became one of the pioneers of the Campine Painters (called the School of Genk), a school which has been unjustly forgotten.

The years 1850–1860 were those of his greatest success, including numerous sales in Belgium, in Great Britain and in the United States, having works acquired by the Shah of Persia, by the Belgian and British royal houses, a study tour of Scotland commissioned by Queen Victoria, but which unfortunately never took place because of the sudden death of Albert, Prince Consort (December 1861), and when he received the title of Chevalier de l’Ordre de Léopold (1869).

His painting, constructed according to indefinitely repeated formulae and each year becoming a little more tired, finished however by wearying the art chroniclers : "Critics of the press have often reproached him for the bias he shows in his painting. M Roffiaen has ignored them, he has continued to accumulate landscapes of Belgium, Scotland, Switzerland, Germany, Italy, what do I know, combing them without rest, using the same formula, making do with the same sky, the same trees, the same rocks, unconcerned by the latitudes, according to the taste of a special public, who buy all of that and pay him handsomely. Leave M. Roffiaen alone, gentlemen of the press, he paints his little nature scenes one demands of him and knows well the reason why." (G. H., L’Organe de Namur et de la Province, 1874).

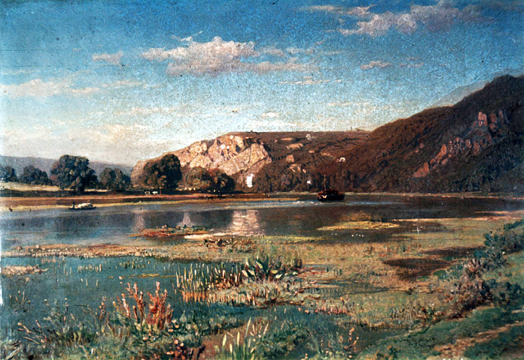
François Roffiaen, On the banks of the river Meuse at Waulsort (oil on panel, 1876)

However, on several occasions a critic like Gustave Lagye (1843–1908) attempted to emphasise the qualities of his art, both in its extreme delicacy and finesse and in its almost photographic detail. "Although opposed to M. Roffiaen for his manner of painting, dry and thin, I am obliged to admire him for the prodigious ability and above all for the exquisite art with which he holds grandiose panoramas in the narrowest of frames, where he chisels the smallest bump with the scruples of a miniaturist. Allow lovers of great painting to prefer in general large studies, executed in a day of fever and inspiration, but the tourist always prefers fine and complete pictorial photographs, where M. Roffiaen allows them to rediscover the scenes that he admired and details of the places themselves from an enthusiastic and curious point of view. His Borders of the Meuse, at Wauslort; his Marshes of Genck, at the approach of Sunset; his View into the Bernese Overland, are treated in a gothic manner, also in their perspective and their elegance. M. Roffiaen is a figure apart in the Belgian artistic movement and one should give him the justice he is due" (La Féderation artistique, 1877). The execution of certain animals or little characters which fill out his works have been left to others more expert than he in these matters, as is the custom in traditional artistic circles : Johannes Hubertus Leonardus de Haas (1832–1908), Adolf Dillens (1821–1877), Théodore Gérard (1829–1902), Louis Robbe (1806–1887), Paul Van der Vin (1823–1877), Frans Van Leemputten (1850–1914), Eugène Verboeckhoven (1799–1881) or again the brothers Edward (1819–1897) and Constant (1823–1867) Woutermaertens.

Initiated in April 1854 into the most important lodge in the kingdom, The True Friends of the Union and of Progress Reunited, François Roffiaen pushed his masonic career up to the 33rd and last degree of the Ancient and Accepted Scottish Rite, his name appearing in the List of Great General Inspectors for the Supreme Council of Belgium, of which he was Grand Master of Ceremonies for twenty eight years. In 1883, his involvement encouraged him to pay homage openly by dedicating one of his paintings to his Brother, General Antonio Guzmán-Blanco (1829–1899), president of the republic of Venezuela.

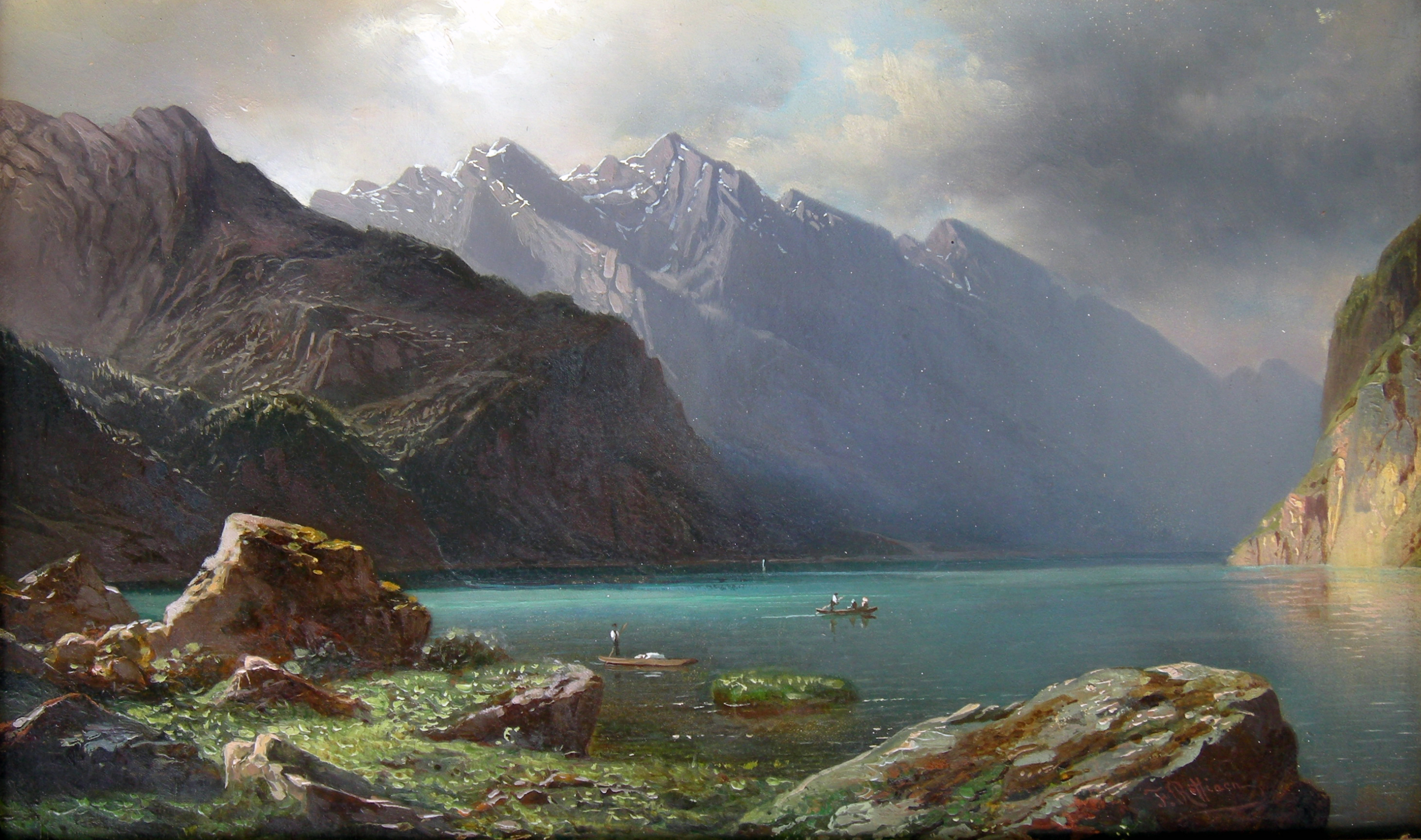
François Roffiaen, The Banks of the Königsee (Upper Bavaria) (oil on cardboard, not dated)

François Roffiaen was also illustrious in the domain of natural sciences, to which Jules Colbeau (1823–1881) introduced him in his youth. As children the two companions took delight in observing nature in the little property that Colbeau's parents owned in the suburbs of Namur. As adults, they took a journey together to Switzerland (1852) where they collected insects, butterflies and molluscs. In January 1863, their mutual passion for the last type of living creatures led them, with five other people, Firmin De Malzine, Egide Fologne, Henri Lambotte, Alexandre Seghers and Joseph Weyers – to found the Malacological Society of Belgium, to whose Annals Roffiaen made diverse contributions : "Notes conchyoliogiques" (French translation from an article in Italian by Dr Senoner (t.1); "Mollusques terrestres et fluviatiles recueillis en Suisse" and "Essais pour obtenir les Helix scalariformes" (t.3); "Coquilles recueillies à Hastière et à Chimay" (t. 6); "Mollusques observés dans la vallée de l’Ourthe" (t. 8); "Mollusques recueillis dans le Grand-Duché de Luxembourg" (t. 9); "Mollusques recueillis à Gand"; "Mollusques recueillis à Waulsor" (t. 10); "Mollusques recueillis dans les environs de Gand" (t. 11); "Notes sur des mollusques recueillis à Waulsort" (t. 12); "Jules Colbeau et la Société royale malacologique de Belgique" (t. 16); "Rapport sur l’assemble générale du 1er juillet 1882" (t. 17). He was the owner of a remarkable personal collection of molluscs, and also attended to the increase and the presentation of those of the Malacological Society. He invented a series of instruments used to extract the animals from their shells and constructed a cochlearium, a sort of vivarium used for the observation and raising of molluscs. A sign of the place he occupies in this little scholarly world of his time, two of the animals—one living and a fossil—even received his name, Planorbis Roffiaeni and Cyprina Roffiaeni respectively.

== Personal life and death ==
His first marriage took place in Ixelles on 19 November 1847 to Éléonore Bodson from Dinant (1792–1854) and on 14 October 1858 in Louvain he later married Marie Anne Tilly, who bore him a son named Hector (1859–1895). He lived in the Belgian capital from 1847, changing his address several times, from rue aux Herbes Potagères 30 to Saint-Josse-ten-Noode up to 1848, rue Goffart 28 in Ixelles until 1853, chaussée de Wavre 31, also in Ixelles until 1859, chaussée de Charleroi 131 in Saint-Gilles until 1863 and finally rue du Financier, which was renamed a little later to rue Godecharle 16 in Ixelles.

Roffiaen died on 25 January 1898 in Ixelles, Belgium.

== Legacy ==
To thank the city of his birth for the support they had given him, Roffiaen gave a Landscape with Hydraulic Mill (1844), a Waterfall of the Aar in the High Alps and a View from Grütli on Lake Geneva (1857) to the local museum. He also bequeathed a lot later a large Valley of Chamonix to the commune of Ixelles, of which he was on the board of directors since the time of its creation in 1892.

Some months after his death, the local authorities gave the name of François Roffiaen to a street in Ixelles. In 1907, an article was dedicated to him in the Biographie nationale, edited by the Royal Academy of Belgium. Madeleine Ley (1901–1981), his great-granddaughter (Prix Rossel 1940), called his image briefly to mind in her novel Olivia (Gallimard, 1936; re-edition Labor, 1986). But the character had already been forgotten. In the first half of the twentieth century his name was no longer cited except by chance, his case dismissed in a few hasty phrases and often scathingly, preferring a livelier form of art, one that was more personal, more "sincere", more "credible", in a word, more "modern" than his, as if this was understood once and for all. Since the years 1960–70, however, there has been a renewal of interest in the art of the "little masters" of the nineteenth century, to which there are more than one "folding away seat of some kind after the official armchair that many among them have occupied at the time of a triumphant academism and towards which certain people attempt to return, since the course of taste is in perpetual motion" (Gérald Schurr, 1979), and the work of Roffiaen is on the way to becoming rehabilitated. A first exhibition was especially dedicated to him at the communal Museum of Ypres, from 5 December 1998 to 4 April 1999.

== Bibliography ==
- 1907 : Joseph Nève, " Roffiaen (François Xavier) ", Biographie nationale (Brussels), t. 19, col. 685–687.
- 1989 : Luc Hiernaux, " François-Xavier Roffiaen, membre fondateur et ancien président de la Société malacologique de Belgique (1820–1898) ", Annales de la Société royale zoologique de Belgique (Brussels), t. 119, pp. 223–226.
- 1990 : Luc Hiernaux, " Tussen stad en schilder : François Roffiaen (1820–1898) en Ieper, zijn geboorte plaats", Iepers Kwartier (Ypres), t. 26, pp. 66–74.
- 1990 : Luc Hiernaux, " Meuse et pays mosan dans la vie et dans l'oeuvre de François-Xavier Roffiaen ", Annales de la Société archéologique de Namur (Namur), t. 66, pp. 299–328.
- 1994–95 : Luc Hiernaux, " Note à propos du voyage de François Roffiaen dans les Highlands d'Écosse en 1862 ", Bulletin des Musées royaux des Beaux-Arts de Belgique (Brussels), pp. 167–182.
- 1996 : Luc Hiernaux, " Roffiaen, Jean François Xavier, kunstschilder ", Nationaal biografisch woordenboek (Brussels), t. 15, col. 618–624.
- 1998 : Jan Dewilde, François Roffiaen (1820–1898), Schetsen uit de carrière van een landschapschilder, Ypres, Stedelijk Museum, 71 pp.
- 2009 : Luc Hiernaux and Jan Dewilde, François Roffiaen (1820–1898), Ypres, Stedelijk Museum, 239 pp.
