= Dinant (Chamber of Representatives constituency) =

Belgian political subdivision

Dinant was a constituency used to elect members of the Belgian Chamber of Representatives between 1831 and 1900.

== Representatives ==
Election	Representative (Party)	Representative (Party)
1831	François Pirson (Liberal)	1 seat
1833	François Pirson (Liberal)	1 seat
1837	François Pirson (Liberal)	1 seat
1841	Victor Pirson (Liberal)	1 seat
1845	Victor Pirson (Liberal)	Hadelin de Liedekerke Beaufort (Catholic)
1848	Xavier Victor Thibaut (Catholic)	Hadelin de Liedekerke Beaufort (Catholic)
1852	Xavier Victor Thibaut (Catholic)	Hadelin de Liedekerke Beaufort (Catholic)
1856	Xavier Victor Thibaut (Catholic)	Hadelin de Liedekerke Beaufort (Catholic)
1857	Xavier Victor Thibaut (Catholic)	Hadelin de Liedekerke Beaufort (Catholic)
1861	Xavier Victor Thibaut (Catholic)	Hadelin de Liedekerke Beaufort (Catholic)
1864	Xavier Victor Thibaut (Catholic)	Hadelin de Liedekerke Beaufort (Catholic)
1868	Xavier Victor Thibaut (Catholic)	Hadelin de Liedekerke Beaufort (Catholic)
1870	Xavier Victor Thibaut (Catholic)	Hadelin de Liedekerke Beaufort (Catholic)
1874	Xavier Victor Thibaut (Catholic)	Hadelin de Liedekerke Beaufort (Catholic)
1878	Xavier Victor Thibaut (Catholic)	Hadelin de Liedekerke Beaufort (Catholic)
1882	Xavier Victor Thibaut (Catholic)	Hadelin de Liedekerke Beaufort (Catholic)
1886	Xavier Victor Thibaut (Catholic)	Jules de Montpellier d'Annevoie (Catholic)
1890	Paul Marie Delvaux (Catholic)	Jules de Montpellier d'Annevoie (Catholic)
1892	Paul Marie Delvaux (Catholic)	Jules de Montpellier d'Annevoie (Catholic)
1894	Paul Marie Delvaux (Catholic)	Jules de Montpellier d'Annevoie (Catholic)
1898	Paul Marie Delvaux (Catholic)	Jules de Montpellier d'Annevoie (Catholic)
1900	Merged into Dinant-Philippeville	
