= Communist Party (Flanders) =

Communist Party Kommunistische Partij
- Leader: Jaak Perquy
- Founded: 1989
- Dissolved: 2009
- Split from: Communist Party of Belgium
- Headquarters: Brussels, Belgium
- Newspaper: Agora
- Youth wing: Jong-KP
- Ideology: Communism; Marxism-Leninism
- Colours: Red

The Communist Party (Dutch: Kommunistische Partij, pronounced [ˌkɔmyˈnɪstisə pɑrˈtɛi], often abbreviated KP) was a political party in Flanders, Belgium. It was founded in 1989 in the aftermath of the split of the Communist Party of Belgium along linguistic lines. The political secretary of the KP was Jaak Perquy. The KP was dissolved in 2009.

The KP published a newspaper, Agora. The youth wing evolved into Graffiti Jeugddienst, an apolitical youth association, in the early 1990s. Later on another youth wing, Jong-KP, was established.

== History ==
The party was formed after the split of the Communist Party of Belgium (KPB) in 1989; Ludo Loose, who had previously been chairman of the Flemish wing of the KPB, became its chairman. The French-speaking wing continued as the Communist Party of Wallonia-Brussels.

In September 1991, a document was drawn up by the party leadership regarding the future of the party and its potential transformation into an open Marxist organization. On September 10 of that year, the traditional press reported that the KP had ceased to exist.

Subsequently, a discussion erupted in both De Rode Vaan and the members' magazine Feiten en Argumenten regarding the document in question, in which the various views of prominent members, sympathizers, and branches were published. This led to a new resolution text that was approved at the Flemish Communist Party meeting on January 11, 1992, and entailed, among other things, that the party was moving away from the classic communist party organization, as well as creating room for cooperation with other movements and across party lines. However, it argued against any form of entryism. After three discussion sessions at the 4th Flemish Communist Party Congress in May 1992, at which Ludo Loose, Ludo Abicht, John Kennes and Filip Delmotte, among others, spoke, this led to the drafting of a resolution containing two important elements: the reaffirmation of the party's communist identity and the transformation of the party.

In the 1990s, the party was a part of the Regenboog (REGEBO) political coalition and the Red-Green Movement (RGB), together with the Trotskyist SAP as well as some independent trade unionists and pacifists. REGEBO participated in elections three times in 1989, 1991, and 1994. In addition, the party was also active in the Left Ecological Forum (LEF), in which the SAP, Left Ecological Unity Front (LEEF), and Sta Op (a group around Raf Verbeke), among others, were also active.

In 2009 the party was dissolved and transformed into a political think tank. That same year, the Antwerp branch of the Communist Party called for people to vote for Peter Mertens of the Workers' Party of Belgium (PVDA), arguing that this would not divide left-wing progressive votes. This position, which was taken both on the website and in Agora (the party's magazine), was a break with the past in which both parties had been rigidly opposed towards each other.

== Electoral results ==
=== Chamber of Representatives ===
Election	Votes	%	Seats	+/−	Government	Elected members of parliament
1991	11,994	0.19	0 / 212	New	Extra-parliamentary	

=== Senate ===
Election	Votes	%	Seats	+/−	Government	Elected members of parliament
1991	12,150	0.2	0 / 212	New	Extra-parliamentary	

=== European Parliament ===
Election	List leader	Votes	%		Seats	+/−	EP Group
Election	List leader	Votes	D.E.C.	Overall	Seats	+/−	EP Group
1989	26,472	0.43 (#12)	0.72	0 / 24	0	New	
1994	15,549	0.26 (#19)	0.42	0 / 24	0	−	
