= Red Lions (political party) =

Political party

- Split from: Belgian Socialist Party
- Merged into: Socialistische Partij
- Ideology: Socialism
- Political position: Left-wing

The Red Lions (Dutch: Rode Leeuwen) was a socialist political party in Belgium.

== History ==
The party first contested national elections in 1968, but failed to secure a seat after winning less than 1% of the vote. In the 1971 general elections it received 2% of the national vote and won four seats in the Chamber of Representatives. In the Senate elections it allied with the Belgian Socialist Party, but failed to win a seat.

For the 1974 general elections the party allied with the Socialist Party for the elections to both houses. It lost its four seats in the Chamber, but gained two seats in the Senate. The party did not contest any further elections.

== Election results ==
=== Chamber of Representatives ===
Election	Votes	%	Seats	+/–
1968	46,065	0.89	0 / 212	New
1971	104,040	1.97	4 / 212	▲4
1974	86,929	1.65	0 / 212	▼4

=== Senate ===
Election	Votes	%	Seats	+/-
1968	45,097	0.88	0 / 106	New
1971	97,371	1.87	0 / 106	0
1974	82,959	1.60	2 / 106	▲2
