= War Van Overstraeten =

Flemish communist activist and painter

Eduard (War) Van Overstraeten (8 May 1891, Wetteren – 9 December 1981, Bruges) was a Flemish communist activist and painter. He was one of the founders of the Communist Party of Belgium.

At the end of the First World War, he was a member of the Young Socialist Guard. In 1920 he attended the 2nd World Congress of the Comintern where he defended Left Communist positions. He participated in the founding of Kultintern

He also attended the 3rd World Congress of the Comintern in 1921, where he was elected to the Executive Committee of the Communist International.

In 1923 he was imprisoned for four months for his opposition to the occupation of the Ruhr. In 1925 he was elected as a Communist deputy to the Belgian Chamber of Representatives. However in 1927 he organised a majority of the Belgian Communist Party in opposition to the expulsion of Trotsky and Zinoviev. He was then purged in 1928 as a trotskyist. He remained active for a few years as a dissident communist before giving up political activity in the thirties.

He subsequently focussed on painting and retired in Bruges.
