= Jean Borremans =

Belgian politician

Jean Louis Ghislain Borremans (14 May 1911, in Kasteelbrakel – 8 February 1968, in Brussels) was a Belgian politician from the communist party PCB.

Borremans was a labourer and communist Member of Parliament. He was arrested in April 1941 with another Brussels delegate of the party, Jules Vanderlinden, and deported to a concentration camp. He survived the war and returned to politics in the 1950s.

== Political career ==
- 1939 - 1949: Representative for the electoral district Nijvel
- 1946 - 1947: Minister of Public Works
- 1950 - 1954: Representative for the electoral district Nijvel
