= 1974 Belgian general election =

- 10 March 1974

212 seats in the Chamber of Representatives
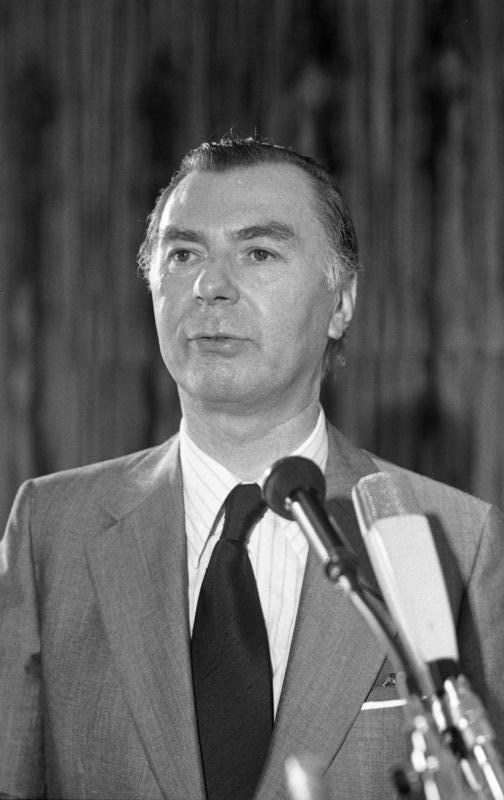

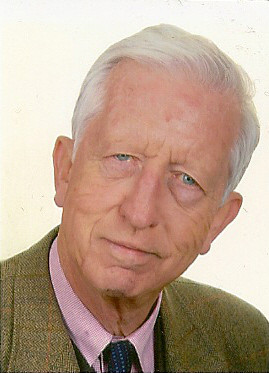

	First party	Second party	Third party
Leader	Edmond Leburton	Leo Tindemans	Frans Grootjans
Party	Socialist	CVP	Open Vld
Leader since	Candidate for PM	Candidate for PM	1973
Last election	25 seats, 10.40%^{[a]}	40 seats, 18.32%	16 seats, 7.42%
Seats won	59	50	30
Seat change	▲34	▲10	▲14
Popular vote	1,401,725	1,222,646	798,818
Percentage	26.66%	23.25%	15.19%
Swing	▲16.26%	▲4.91%	▲7.77%
	Fourth party	Fifth party	Sixth party
Leader	Frans Van der Elst	Charles-Ferdinand Nothomb	André Lagasse
Party	VU	cdH	DéFI
Leader since	1955	1972	1972
Last election	21 seats, 11.11%	15 seats, 6.20%	12 seats, 5.43%
Seats won	22	22	14
Seat change	▲1	▲7	▲2
Popular vote	536,287	478,209	301,303
Percentage	10.20%	9.09%	5.73%
Swing	▼0.91%	▲2.89%	▲0.30%
- Results by constituency for the Chamber of Representatives
Government before election
Leburton II
BSP/PSB-CVP-PSC-PVV-PRL
Government after election
Tindemans I
CVP-PSC-PVV-PRL

General elections were held in Belgium on 10 March 1974. The Belgian Socialist Party emerged as the largest faction in the Chamber of Representatives with 59 of the 212 seats. Voter turnout was 90.3%. Elections were also held for the nine provincial councils, as well as for the Council of the German Cultural Community for the first time.

== Results ==
=== Chamber of Representatives ===
Party	Votes	%	Seats	+/–
Belgian Socialist Party	1,314,796	25.00	59	+2
Christian People's Party	1,222,646	23.25	50	+10
Party for Freedom and Progress	798,818	15.19	30	+4
People's Union	536,287	10.20	22	+1
Christian Social Party	478,209	9.09	22	+7
FDF–PDLP	301,303	5.73	14	New
Walloon Rally	269,455	5.12	11	−1
Communist Party of Belgium	107,481	2.04	2	New
BSP–Red Lions	86,929	1.65	0	New
Democratic and Progressive Union	58,527	1.11	2	+2
All Power to the Workers	19,794	0.38	0	New
United Feminist Party	18,511	0.35	0	New
Party for the Middle Classes and Independents	9,184	0.17	0	New
Party of German-speaking Belgians	8,700	0.17	0	New
Walloon Liberal Party	6,846	0.13	0	New
FDP	4,729	0.09	0	New
Democratic and Progressive Union–New Democracy	3,623	0.07	0	New
Rex Fr	2,764	0.05	0	New
Return to Liège	1,810	0.03	0	New
Kaganovemus	1,678	0.03	0	0
SAP	1,445	0.03	0	New
Diependale	1,229	0.02	0	New
A74	979	0.02	0	New
PRS	905	0.02	0	New
Zwartberg	665	0.01	0	New
Trotskyists	645	0.01	0	New
Belgian Radical Union	389	0.01	0	New
PUR	184	0.00	0	New
Total	5,258,531	100.00	212	0
Valid votes	5,258,531	92.07		
Invalid/blank votes	453,108	7.93		
Total votes	5,711,639	100.00		
Registered voters/turnout	6,323,027	90.33		
Source: Belgian Elections

=== Senate ===
Party	Votes	%	Seats	+/–
Belgian Socialist Party	1,301,722	25.11	27	New
Christian People's Party	1,219,811	23.53	27	New
Party for Freedom and Progress	755,694	14.58	16	+1
FDF–RW–PDLP	589,553	11.37	13	New
People's Union	545,215	10.52	10	New
Christian Social Party	430,512	8.30	10	New
Communist Party of Belgium	115,007	2.22	1	0
BSP–Red Lions	82,959	1.60	2	+2
Democratic and Progressive Union	60,400	1.16	0	0
Party for Freedom and Progress (Wallonia)	21,782	0.42	0	New
All Power to the Workers	16,744	0.32	0	New
Party of German-speaking Belgians	15,624	0.30	0	New
United Feminist Party	11,910	0.23	0	New
Party for the Middle Classes and Independents	5,918	0.11	0	New
Iependael	2,784	0.05	0	New
Zwartberg	2,149	0.04	0	New
Kaganovemus	1,903	0.04	0	0
PMO–Belgian Radical Union	1,078	0.02	0	New
A74	942	0.02	0	New
Walloon Liberal Party	597	0.01	0	New
PUR	156	0.00	0	New
Other parties	2,255	0.04	0	–
Total	5,184,715	100.00	106	0
Valid votes	5,184,715	90.77		
Invalid/blank votes	527,014	9.23		
Total votes	5,711,729	100.00		
Registered voters/turnout	6,323,027	90.33		
Source: Belgian Elections

=== Council of the German Cultural Community ===
In this election, the new Council of the German Cultural Community (Rat der deutschen Kulturgemeinschaft) was directly elected for the first time; members of the council had been appointed a year earlier. The council is the precursor to the Parliament of the German-speaking Community.

Party	Votes	%	Seats	+/–
Christian Social Party		46.90	12	–1
Party of German-speaking Belgians		25.40	6	+3
Partei für Freiheit und Fortschritt		14.90	4	–2
Belgian Socialist Party		12.10	3	0
Other parties		15.10	0	–
Total			25	0
Source: PDG
