= Edmond Leburton =

Belgian politician (1915–1997)

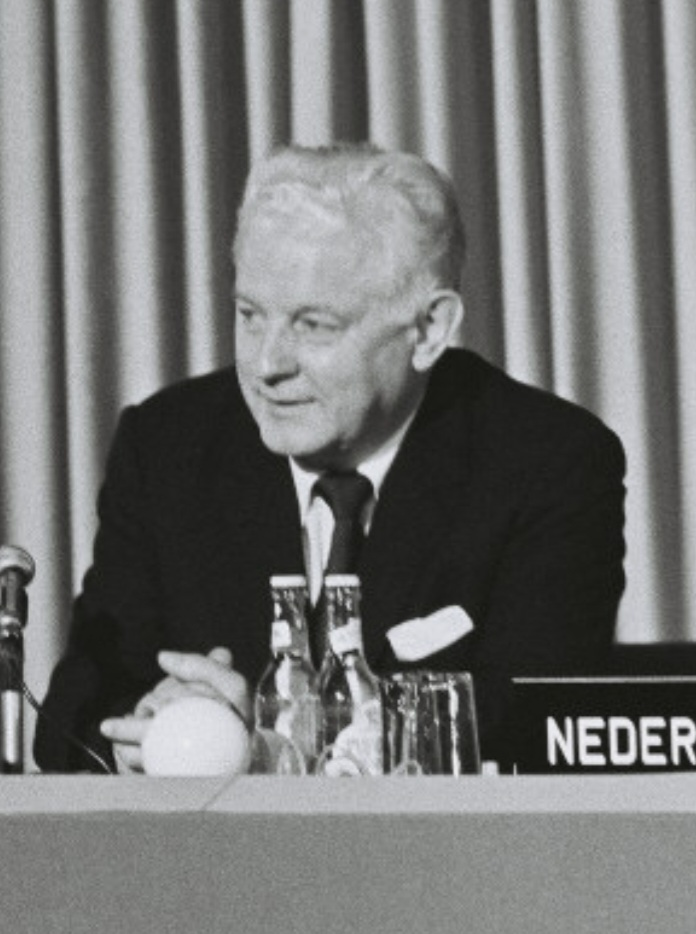
- Leburton in 1973

Prime Minister of Belgium
- In office 26 January 1973 – 25 April 1974
- Monarch: Baudouin
- Preceded by: Gaston Eyskens
- Succeeded by: Leo Tindemans

President of the Chamber of Representatives
- In office 7 June 1977 – 3 April 1979
- Preceded by: André Dequae
- Succeeded by: Charles-Ferdinand Nothomb

Personal details
- Born: 18 April 1915 Waremme, German-occupied Belgium
- Died: 15 June 1997 (aged 82) Waremme, Belgium
- Political party: Socialist Party
- Spouse: Charlotte (Joniaux) Leburton (m. 1947)
- Children: Jean-Pierre Leburton

Edmond Jules Isidore Leburton (18 April 1915 – 15 June 1997) was a Belgian politician who served as the prime minister of Belgium from 1973 to 1974.

He first entered Parliament representing Huy, Belgium.

== Prime Minister of Belgium ==
Leburton served as the Prime Minister of Belgium from January 1973 to April 1974. A number of reforms were carried out under Leburton's government, including a law on 'prolonged minority' (June 1973) to safeguard people with mental disabilities, the introduction of annual adjustments to pensions to the level of economic prosperity (March 1973), and the passage of an Act which strengthened the rights of tenants (November 1973). In addition, improvements were made to various social welfare benefits. He was the last native French speaker to hold that office, disregarding the bilingual Paul Vanden Boeynants from Brussels, until Elio Di Rupo took office in December 2011. He was a member of the Socialist Party. Leburton was also the last member of that party to hold the office of Prime Minister until Elio Di Rupo.

== Personal life ==
On 20 December 1947, Leburton married Charlotte (Joniaux) (20 August 1922 – 17 September 2020) and had two sons, Jean-Pierre (born 4 March 1949), and Eddy (born 28 July 1951). He died on 15 June 1997 in Waremme, aged 82.

== Honours ==
The list of all Honours is published on the carte de Deuil, 1997.

- Belgium : Minister of State, by Royal Decree.
- Belgium : Grand Cordon in the Order of Leopold, by Royal Decree of 16.04.1977.
- Belgium : Grand Cross in the Order of Leopold II.
- Belgium : Croix de Guerre.
- Knight Grand Cross in the Order of Merit of the Italian Republic
- Knight Grand Cross in the Order of Orange-Nassau.
- Knight Grand Cross in the Order of the Oak Crown.
- Knight Grand Cross in the Order of the Aztec Eagle.
- Knight Grand Cross in the Order of Isabella the Catholic.
- Knight Grand Cross in the Order of King Abdul Aziz.
- Grand Officer in the Legion of Honour

== See also ==
- Politics of Belgium

Political offices
Preceded by Gaston Eyskens	Prime Minister of Belgium; 1973–1974	Succeeded by Leo Tindemans
Preceded by André Dequae	President of the Chamber of Representatives; 1977–1979	Succeeded by Charles-Ferdinand Nothomb
