= Henri Lambotte =

Belgian entomologist and zoologist (1816–1873)

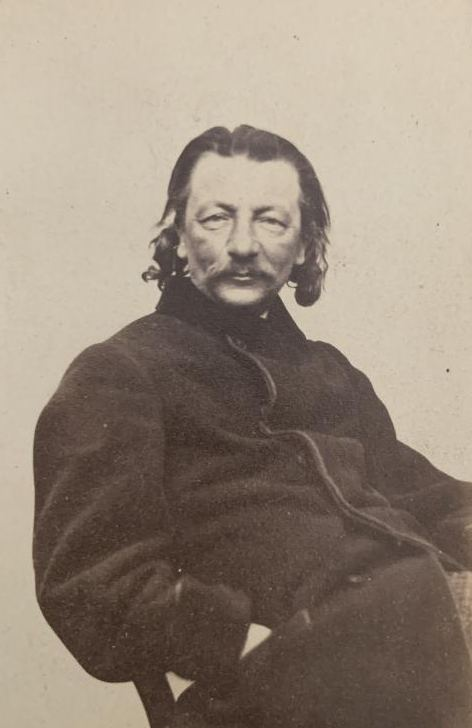

Henri-Antoine-Joseph Lambotte (1816 – 17 October 1873) was a Belgian comparative zoologist who worked at the University of Liège before shifting to geology at the Namur school of mines. He was among the first to establish cutaneous respiration in amphibians. He also studied minerals and took an interest in geology and chemistry. He was involved in the founding of the Malacological Society of Belgium.

== Biography ==
Lambotte was born in Namur and studied humanities at the college of Namur before joining the University of Liège. He studied under Vincenz Fohmann, working on preparing specimens for comparative anatomy. When the prosector of anatomy fell ill, he took the place for nearly two years. The collections of human and animals were separated after the death of Fohmann and the comparative anatomy specimens were put under the curatorship of Lambotte.

He received his doctorate in 1837 and as curator of the collections he prepared nearly 300 specimens. In 1837 he wrote a thesis on the respiration of tadpoles, identifying cutaneous respiration as well as the connection between the branchial and abdominal cavities. He then suggested that the respiration of mammal embryos would also have the same cutaneous adaptations. He also suggested that light might have a role in the development of the respiratory organs, suggesting that the developmental arrest of the salamander Proteus in underground lakes in Carniola might likewise be due to the lack of light. He also studied a spider Theridion malmignatte. In 1839 he studied blood cells and their response to carbon dioxide.

In 1840 he tried to apply ideas from organic chemistry in anatomical and physiological research (Nouvelle théorie de Chimie organique). In 1841 he examined the anatomy of Nymphea lutea. He was appointed to teach comparative anatomy at Liege but in 1842 he took a position at Namur to take up a vacancy caused by the death of François-Philippe Cauchy (1795–1842). Here he shifted to mineralogy and geology. He worked on the identification of minerals using physical and chemical properties. He examined igneous intrusions in sedimentary rocks. He also studied coal deposits but the Namur school of mines was closed in 1851.

In 1856 he examined the development of the thyroid gland in vertebrates. He considered it to be the remnants of the temporary gills of amphibians. In 1862 he was involved in establishing the Malacological Society of Belgium. He was interested in the development of the nervous system in molluscs. In 1863 he was appointed as a professor of zoology, comparative anatomy, mineralogy and geology at the University of Brussels.

His son Albin Lambotte (1866–1955) became a pioneer of orthopedic surgical intervention, while his older son Elie Lambotte (1856–1912) became a surgeon.
