= 1968 Belgian general election =

- 31 March 1968

212 seats in the Chamber of Representatives
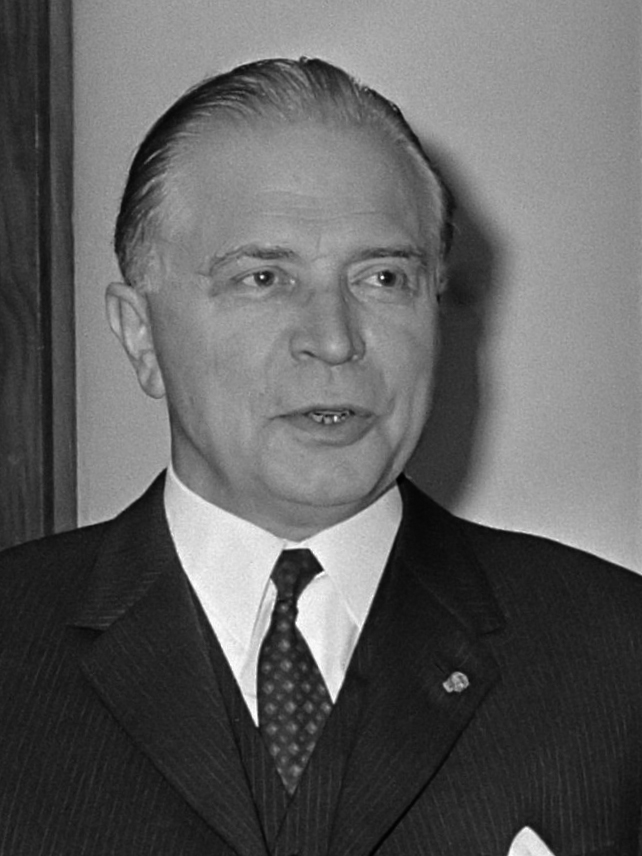

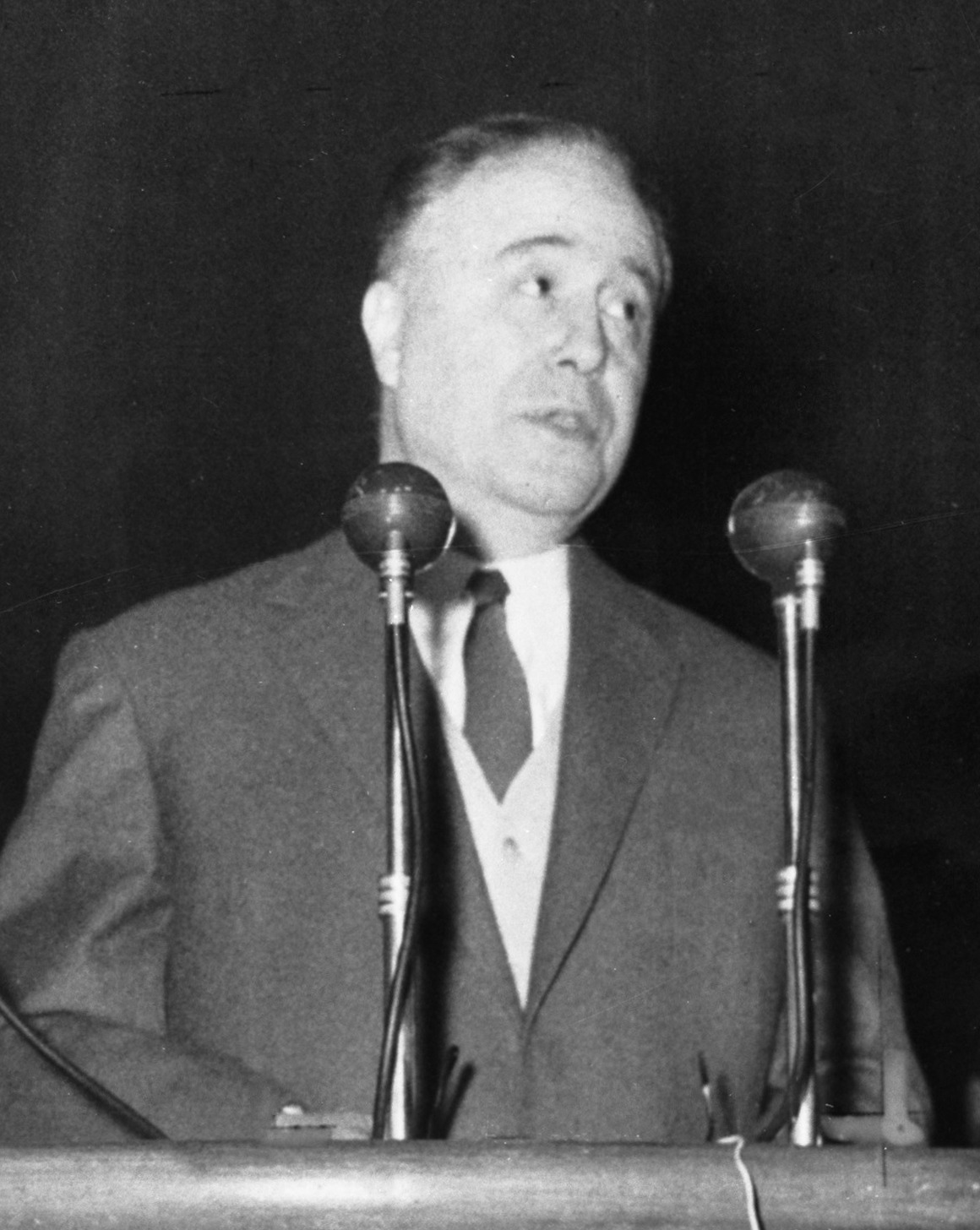

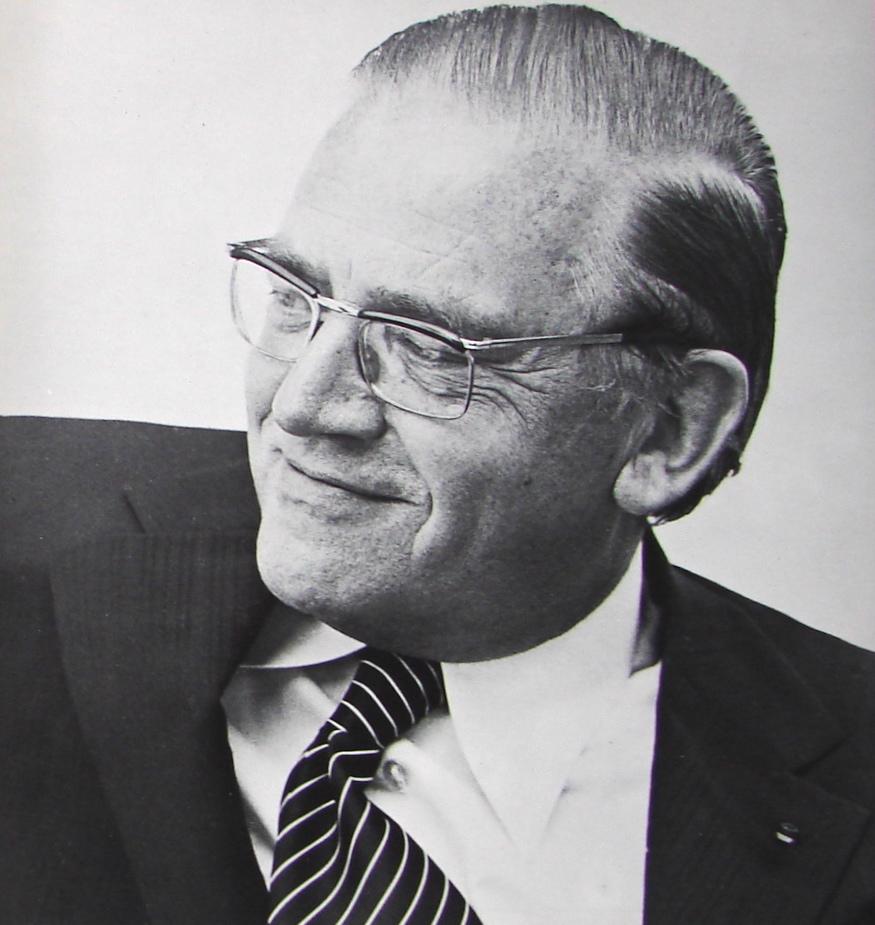

	First party	Second party	Third party
Leader	Gaston Eyskens	Léo Collard	Omer Vanaudenhove
Party	Christian Social	Socialist	Freedom and Progress
Leader since	Candidate for PM	1959	1961
Last election	77 seats, 34.45%	64 seats, 28.28%	48 seats, 21.61%
Seats won	69	59	47
Seat change	▼8	▼5	▼1
Popular vote	1,643,785	1,403,107	1,080,894
Percentage	31.75%	27.10%	20.87%
Swing	▼2.65%	▼1.18%	▼0.74%
	Fourth party	Fifth party	Sixth party
Leader	Frans Van der Elst	Albert Peeters
Party	VU	FDF	RW
Leader since	1955	1967
Last election	12 seats, 6.69%	3 seats, 1.33%	New
Seats won	20	6	6
Seat change	▲8	▲3	New
Popular vote	506,697	154,023	151,421
Percentage	9.79%	2.92%	2.92%
Swing	▲3.10%	▲1.59%	New
- Chamber seat distribution by constituency.
Government before election
Vanden Boeynants I
CVP/PSC-PVV/PLP
Government after election
G. Eyskens V
CVP/PSC-BSP/PSB

General elections were held in Belgium on 31 March 1968. The Christian Social Party remained the largest party. Voter turnout was 90.0%. Elections for the nine provincial councils were also held.

The snap elections were called after the government, a coalition of the Christian Social Party and the liberal Party for Freedom and Progress led by Christian Democrat Paul Vanden Boeynants, fell due to the Leuven Crisis.

The linguistic crisis would trigger the split of the dominant Christian Social Party into a Flemish and French-speaking party. The two other main parties would follow suit. The crisis also caused the rise of small linguistic, federalist parties, such as the People's Union on the Flemish side and the Democratic Front of the Francophones and Walloon Rally on the French-speaking side.

== Results ==
=== Chamber of Deputies ===
Party	Votes	%	Seats	+/–
Christian Social Party	1,643,785	31.75	69	–8
Belgian Socialist Party	1,403,107	27.10	59	–5
Party for Freedom and Progress	1,080,894	20.87	47	–1
People's Union	506,697	9.79	20	+8
Communist Party of Belgium	170,625	3.30	5	–1
Democratic Front of the Francophones	154,023	2.97	6	+3
Walloon Rally	151,421	2.92	6	New
Red Lions	46,065	0.89	0	New
Walloon Workers	3,474	0.07	0	New
Pro-Peking Communists	3,119	0.06	0	New
ULS	2,694	0.05	0	New
Return to Liège	1,933	0.04	0	New
Flemish Social Movement	1,922	0.04	0	New
Kaganovemus	1,634	0.03	0	0
Dierenbes	1,608	0.03	0	New
Walloon Communists	964	0.02	0	New
Z. Kleur	723	0.01	0	New
Flemish Communists	702	0.01	0	New
FU Pop	572	0.01	0	New
Trotskyists	289	0.01	0	New
SH	198	0.00	0	New
RJB	161	0.00	0	New
Independents	1,342	0.03	0	0
Total	5,177,952	100.00	212	0
Valid votes	5,177,952	93.22		
Invalid/blank votes	376,700	6.78		
Total votes	5,554,652	100.00		
Registered voters/turnout	6,170,167	90.02		
Source: Belgian Elections

=== Senate ===
Party	Votes	%	Seats	+/–
Belgian Socialist Party	1,410,617	27.60	33	+2
Christian Social Party	1,398,065	27.35	29	–15
Party for Freedom and Progress	1,073,860	21.01	22	–1
People's Union	513,342	10.04	9	+5
FDF–RW	293,433	5.74	5	+4
Communist Party of Belgium	180,130	3.52	2	–1
Vanden Boeynants Kartel	183,171	3.58	6	New
Red Lions	45,097	0.88	0	New
Walloon Workers	3,777	0.07	0	New
Pro-Peking Communists	3,452	0.07	0	New
Kaganovemus	2,694	0.05	0	0
ULS	2,364	0.05	0	New
Flemish Communists	801	0.02	0	New
Walloon Communists	520	0.01	0	New
FU Pop	495	0.01	0	New
Total	5,111,818	100.00	106	0
Valid votes	5,111,818	92.05		
Invalid/blank votes	441,379	7.95		
Total votes	5,553,197	100.00		
Registered voters/turnout	6,170,167	90.00		
Source: Belgian Elections,
