= Communist Party of Belgium =

Political party in Belgium (1921–1989)

Communist Party of Belgium Dutch: Kommunistische Partij van België French: Parti Communiste de Belgique
- Abbreviation: KPB-PCB
- Historical leaders: Joseph Jacquemotte; Julien Lahaut; Louis Van Geyt
- Founders: Joseph Jacquemotte; War Van Overstraeten
- Founded: September 3, 1921
- Dissolved: 1989
- Merger of: Communist Party; Belgian Communist Party
- Succeeded by: Kommunistische Partij; Parti Communiste
- Headquarters: Brussels
- Newspaper: De Roode Vaan (Flemish); Le Drapeau Rouge (French)
- Youth wing: Communist Youth of Belgium
- Paramilitary wing: Partisans Armés (1940–43)
- Membership (1965): 11,000 (peak)
- Ideology: Communism; Eurocommunism (From 1970s)
- Political position: Far-left
- European Parliament group: Communist and Allies Group (1973–1989)
- International affiliation: Comintern (1919–1943); Cominform (1947–1956)

The Communist Party of Belgium (Dutch: Kommunistische Partij van België, pronounced [ˌkɔmyˈnɪstisə pɑrˈtɛi vɑm ˈbɛlɣijə], KPB; French: Parti Communiste de Belgique, pronounced [paʁti kɔmynist də bɛlʒik], PCB) was a political party in Belgium from 1921 to 1989. The youth wing of KPB/PCB was known as the Communist Youth of Belgium. The party published a newspaper known as Le Drapeau Rouge in French and De Roode Vaan in Dutch.

== History ==
The Communist Party of Belgium was formed at a congress in Anderlecht, Brussels on 3–4 September 1921. KPB/PCB was formed through the unification of two groups, the Communist Party led by War Van Overstraeten and the Belgian Communist Party led by Joseph Jacquemotte, following a split from the Belgian Workers Party. At the time of its foundation, KPB/PCB had around 500 members.

The first activists, including the leadership of the party, were most often only in their early twenties. Coming from working-class backgrounds, most were workers or unemployed. A few, such as Joseph Jacquemotte and his comrades, who came from social-democratic trade unionism, were somewhat older.

KPB/PCB became the Belgian section of the Communist International. The party gained parliamentary presence in 1925, as both Van Overstraeten and Jacquemotte were elected to the Chamber of Representatives. By 1935 KPB/PCB had 9 deputies in the Chamber and 4 members in the Senate. In 1938 it had a membership of about 8,500.

Communists faced constant repression at universities, in the army, but above all in factories. Activists were placed on blacklists that circulated among major employers. To track them more effectively, employers founded a secret network in 1925, the “Society for Political, Economic and Social Studies,” and carried out large-scale registration of rebellious workers. As a result, many activists experienced unemployment.

The miners’ strike of 1932 enabled the PCB to establish itself and build its first strongholds. However, mistakes by communist activists—and above all strong police and employer repression—prevented the communists from consolidating their gains. Their publishing materials and typewriters were seized during numerous raids, and dozens of activists were arrested, including many leaders. Some were later prosecuted. A young worker, Louis Tayenne, was killed by a gendarme in Roux. The army occupied the rebellious working-class neighborhoods. The communists were disorganized and lost their gains. This very fierce class struggle ended on a mixed note for the party, but it paved the way for 1936 and its social gains, notably the introduction of the first week of paid leave.

During the Second World War, the party had to go underground during German occupation. Communist leaders, including Julien Lahaut, organized the “strike of the 100,000,” aimed at slowing down production and weakening the German war effort. The party was also closely affiliated with the Partisans Armés, a resistance group during the occupation, however in 1943 much of the party leadership was arrested by German forces. After the end of the war, the party was strengthened and won 23 seats in the parliamentary elections. The party participated in a coalition government with the socialists and the liberals from 1946 to 1947. In the aftermath of the Liberation, the PCB called for severe repression of collaborators, before later showing a certain leniency toward minor collaborators, whom it considered victims of an overly harsh justice system, while the most significant collaborators, drawn from wealthy circles, most often escaped punishment.

On 18 August 1950 the party chairman, Julien Lahaut, was assassinated. No one was ever sentenced for the murder. In 2015, however, a team of Belgian historians concluded that it had been orchestrated by anti-communist elements inside the intelligence services, with a prominent role for the agent André Moyen.

In the mid 1960s the U.S. State Department estimated the party membership to be approximately 9,890.

The party briefly flirted with the Eurocommunist tendency in the 1970s, but retained an ambiguous relationship with Eurocommunism: it did not entirely reject the Soviet model and remained sceptical towards the formation of a Western European power bloc.

KPB/PCB lost its parliamentary presence in 1985.

In 1989 KPB/PCB was divided into two separate parties, Kommunistische Partij in Flanders and Parti Communiste in Wallonia.

Several foreign communist parties, American, British, German, French and Dutch, had branches in Belgium.

== Chairmen of KPB/PCB ==
- Julien Lahaut 1945–1950
- Ernest Burnelle 1954–1968
- Marc Drumaux 1968–1972
- Louis Van Geyt 1972–1989

== General Secretaries of KPB/PCB ==
- Joseph Jacquemotte 1935–1936
- Georges Van den Boom, Georges Van den Boom and Julien Lahaut 1936-1943
- Edgar Lalmand 1943–1954

== Notable members ==
- Célestin Demblon
- Bert Van Hoorick
- Edward Gierek
- Andrée Grandjean
- René Magritte
- Albert Marteaux
- Charles Plisnier
- Paul Nougé

== Communist burgomasters (mayors) ==
- Marcel Levaux (1926–2006), last mayor of Cheratte (Liège province) from April 1971 to December 1976 (in 1977 this commune was absorbed into Visé), deputy from 1968 to 1981
- René Noël, last mayor of Cuesmes (Hainaut province) from 1965 to 1971 (in 1972 this commune was absorbed into Mons), senator from 1949 to 1950, then again from 1954 to 1974
- Marcel Mereau, mayor of Hensies (Hainaut province)
- Elie Hoyas, mayor of Le Roeulx (Hainaut province) from 1976 to 1982
- Marcel Couteau, mayor of Le Roeulx (Hainaut province) from 1982 to 1985, deputy from 1968 to 1974
- Henri Glineur, mayor of Roux (now a part of Charleroi, Hainaut province) from 1947 to 1950, senator from 1946 to 1954
- René Mathy, last mayor of Vyle-et-Tharoul (in 1977 this commune was absorbed into Marchin, Liège province)
- Paul Carette, mayor of Warchin (in 1977 this commune was absorbed into Tournai, Hainaut province)

== Election results ==
Election year	Votes		Seats	Change
Election year	Number	Percentage	Seats	Change
1925	34,149	1.64%	2 / 187	Steady
1929	43,237	1.94%	1 / 187	1
1932	64,552	2.90%	3 / 187	▲2
1936	143,223	6.06%	9 / 202	▲6
1939	90,856	4.65%	9 / 202	Steady
1946	300,099	12.69%	23 / 202	▲14
1949	376,765	7.49%	12 / 212	11
1950	234,541	4.75%	7 / 212	5
1954	184,108	3.57%	4 / 212	3
1958	100,145	1.89%	2 / 212	2
1961	162,238	3.08%	5 / 212	▲3
1965	247,311	4.77%	6 / 212	▲1
1965	247,311	4.77%	6 / 212	▲1
1968	170,625	3.30%	5 / 212	1
1971	91,726 67,487 159,213	1.74% 1.28% 3,02%	4 / 212 1 / 212 5 / 212^{[a]}	Steady
1974	107,481	2.04%	2 / 212^{[b]}	3
1977	37,104 62,410 99,514	0.67% 1.12% 1,79%	2 / 212 0 / 212 2 / 212^{[a]}	Steady
1978	180,234	3.26%	4 / 212	▲2
1981	138,978	2.31%	2 / 212	2
1985	71,695	1.18%	0 / 212	2
1987	51,046	0.80%	0 / 212	Steady

^{a} In the 1971 and 1977 General Elections, the Communist Party used separate lists for both Flanders and Wallonia, despite remaining a single party
^{b} It is unclear whether the Communist Party decided not to run separate lists for the 1974 General Election or the data for regional lists is simply not available

== See also ==
- Communist Struggle (Marxist–Leninist)

== Sources ==
- Geschiedenis van de Belgische KP (in Dutch)
- 1928: Splitsing tussen trotskisten en stalinisten in Belgische KP
