= February 1965 =

Month of 1965

| << | February 1965 | | | | | >> |
| Su | Mo | Tu | We | Th | Fr | Sa |
| | 1 | 2 | 3 | 4 | 5 | 6 |
| 7 | 8 | 9 | 10 | 11 | 12 | 13 |
| 14 | 15 | 16 | 17 | 18 | 19 | 20 |
| 21 | 22 | 23 | 24 | 25 | 26 | 27 |
| 28 |

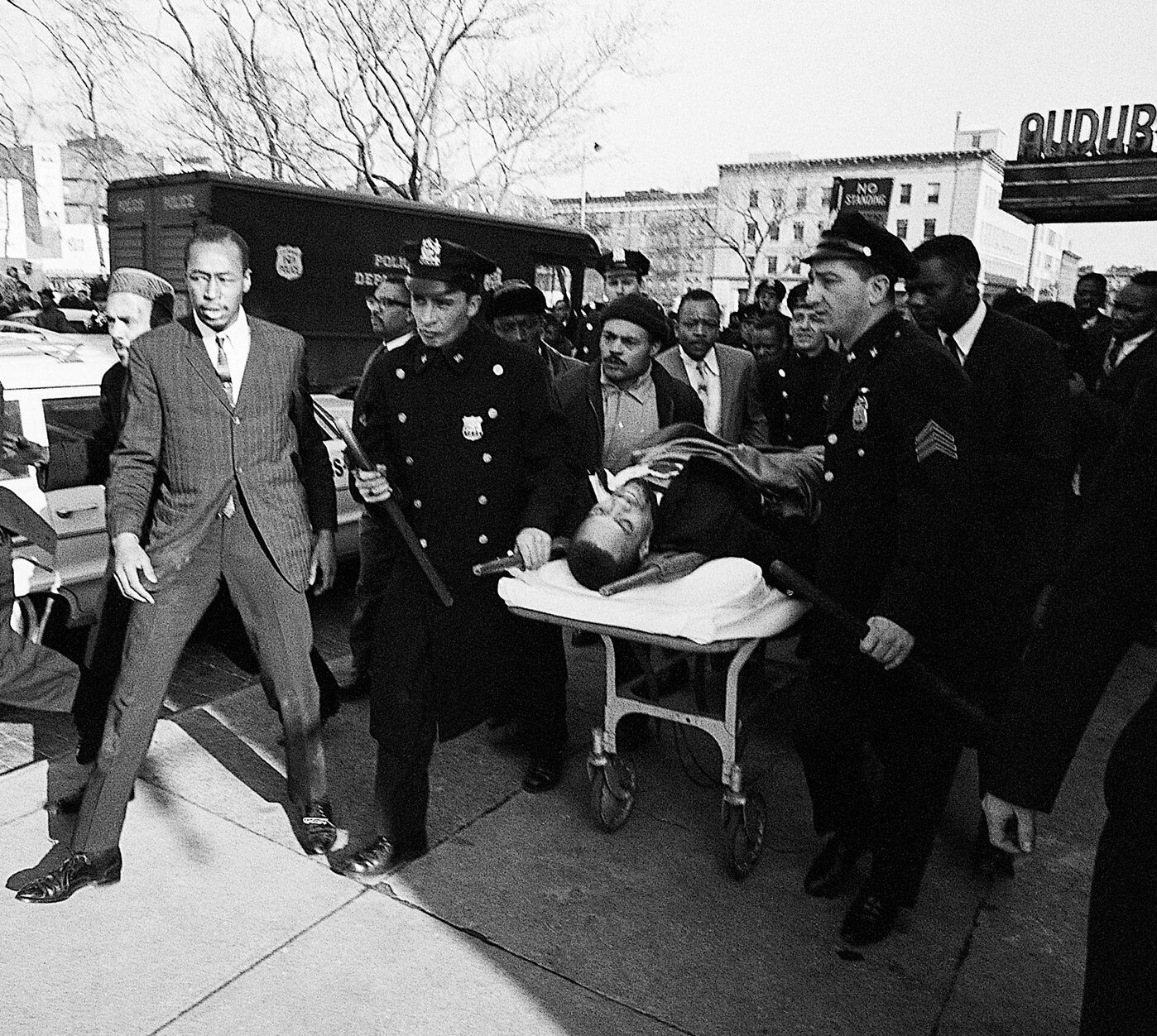
February 21, 1965: Malcolm X is shot and killed by Nation of Islam members before his prepared scheduled speech

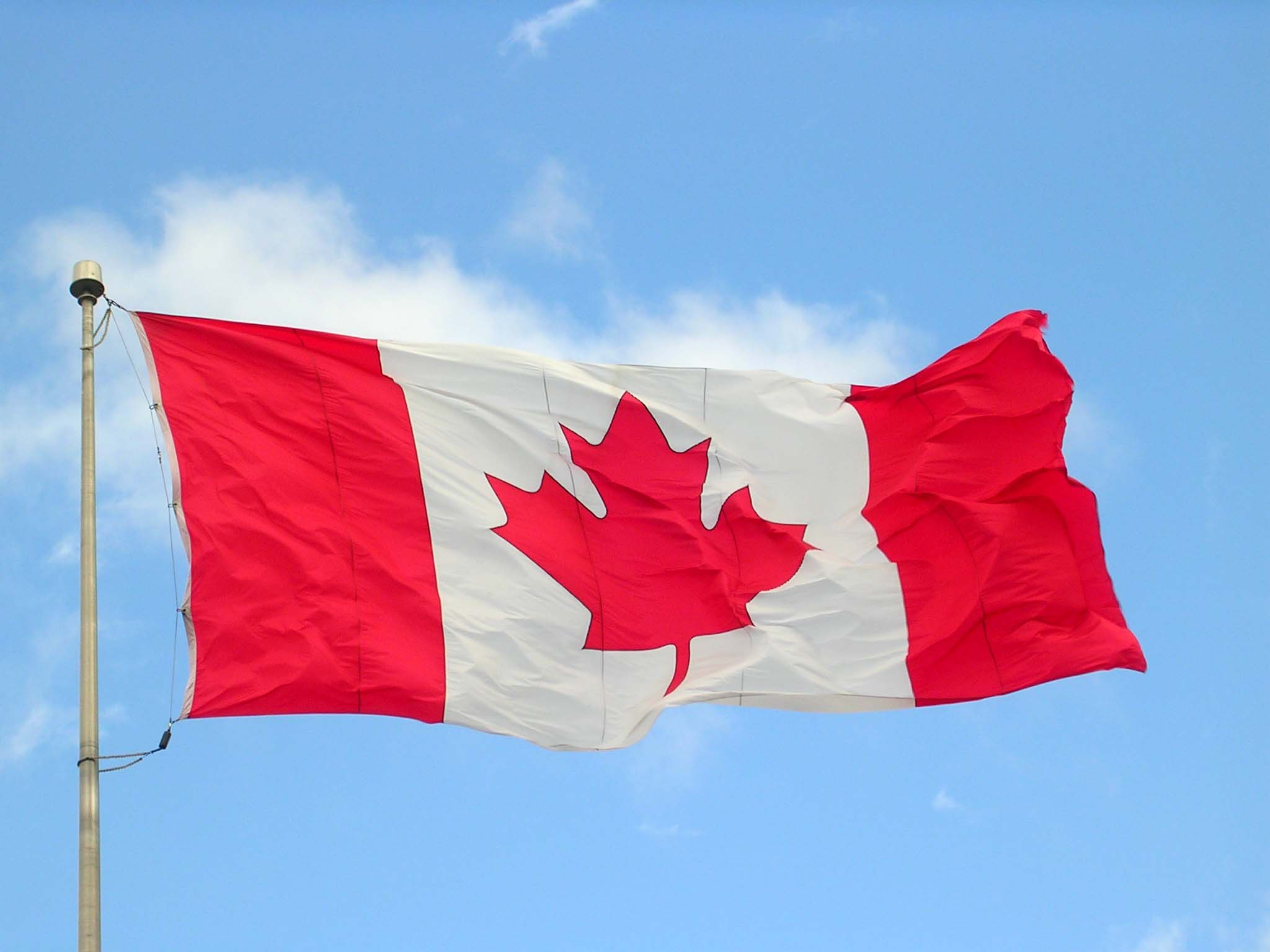
February 15, 1965: The maple leaf becomes the new flag of Canada...

... and the old Canadian flag is retired

The following events occurred in February 1965:

== February 1, 1965 (Monday) ==
- Law enforcement officers in Selma, Alabama, arrested 768 people (nearly all of them African-Americans, including Martin Luther King Jr.) who were marching to protest the impediments to voter registration within Selma and Dallas County. Sheriff Jim Clark charged the group with "parading without permit". Sheriff Clark would arrest another 150 marchers, mostly high school students, later in the week.
- Television commercials were shown by the Swiss Broadcasting Corporation for the first time. Initially, the government limited total TV advertising to a maximum of 12 minutes per day.
- Manned Spacecraft Center (MSC) received the first qualification configuration extravehicular life-support system (ELSS) chest pack. Tests of this unit and the ELSS umbilical assembly were being conducted at MSC. Meanwhile, AiResearch was preparing for systems qualification tests. Zero-gravity flight tests of the ELSS had shown that egress and ingress while wearing a chest pack could readily be done by properly trained astronauts.
- John P. McConnell replaced Curtis LeMay as Chief of Staff of the United States Air Force.
- Born:
  - Brandon Lee, Chinese-American actor, son of Bruce Lee and Linda Lee Cadwell; in Oakland, California (died in on-set accident, 1993)
  - Princess Stéphanie of Monaco, daughter of Prince Rainier III and Princess Grace; in Monte Carlo
  - Sherilyn Fenn, American film and TV actress; in Detroit

== February 2, 1965 (Tuesday) ==
- Missing salesman Lawrence Joseph Bader was spotted at the National Sporting Goods Show in Chicago, United States, by a former classmate almost 8 years after he had vanished. Bader had been missing since May 15, 1957, and had been declared legally dead in 1960, enabling his wife to collect $40,000 of life insurance. Shortly after his disappearance in 1957, he had become known in Omaha, Nebraska, as John Francis "Fritz" Johnson, had married again, and had become a sportscaster at the KETV television station. After multiple confirmations of his identity, Johnson still denied having any memory of being Lawrence Bader, and offered to have his fingerprints compared to Bader's army record; the prints were a match and specialists concluded that he had suffered from amnesia for eight years. He died of cancer, in Omaha, on September 16, 1966.
- British Prime Minister Harold Wilson announced to the House of Commons that the Cabinet had voted to cancel three expensive defense projects. Two were for aircraft capable of vertical takeoffs and landings (VTOL): the Armstrong Whitworth AW.681 was a large military transport plane, and the Hawker Siddeley P.1154 was a supersonic fighter aircraft. The third, the British Aircraft Corporation TSR-2 was a high-speed attack and reconnaissance jet. Wilson said that the cost of the research and development for the TSR-2 alone had already reached 750,000,000 British pounds, more than eight times the original forecast, and that each of the 150 planned TSR-2s would cost four million pounds apiece.
- A vote on a Conservative Party motion of no confidence in the government of Prime Minister Wilson, made in the House of Commons and intended to remove Wilson from office, failed by 17 votes. Voting along party lines, the parties disapproved the censure motion, a resolution describing Wilson's decisions in his first 100 days as premier as "hasty and ill-considered", with 289 Conservative members voting in favor, and 306 Labour members against. The nine MPs from the Liberal Party abstained.
- The U.S. National Science Foundation announced that a team of scientists, led by Keith A.J. Wise of the Bishop Museum of Hawaii, had discovered living animals "in a miniature garden high above a desolate Antarctic icecap 309 miles from the South Pole". The tiny mites, only one quarter of a millimeter (or 1/100 of an inch) in length, were discovered in soil in the Queen Maud Mountains.
- Police in Selma, Alabama, jailed an additional 520 African-American protesters, bringing the total number of people to 1,288.
- Born: Catherine Elizabeth "Cady" Huffman, Tony Award-winning American stage actress; in Santa Barbara, California
- Died: G. N. Watson, 79, English mathematician best known for Watson's lemma

== February 3, 1965 (Wednesday) ==
- An 8.7 magnitude earthquake struck Alaska's Rat Islands at 7:01 p.m. local time (0501 UTC on 4 February 1965) in the western Aleutian Islands of the U.S., and would prove to be the last of the major Pacific quakes of the 20th century. Its epicenter was at 51.3° N, 178.6° E, 20 miles (32 km) south of the uninhabited Amchitka Island, and there were no fatalities despite its large magnitude.
- Abdul Kahar Muzakkar, the 44-year-old leader of the Darul Islam rebellion against the Indonesian government in South Sulawesi, was tracked down and killed by an Indonesian Army patrol, bringing an end to the rebellion.
- U.S. President Lyndon B. Johnson received the "America's Democratic Legacy" award from the Anti-Defamation League of B'nai B'rith.
- Renny Ottolina launched his new show, Renny Presenta..., on Venezuelan television.
- Born: Maura Tierney, American film and TV actress; in Boston

== February 4, 1965 (Thursday) ==
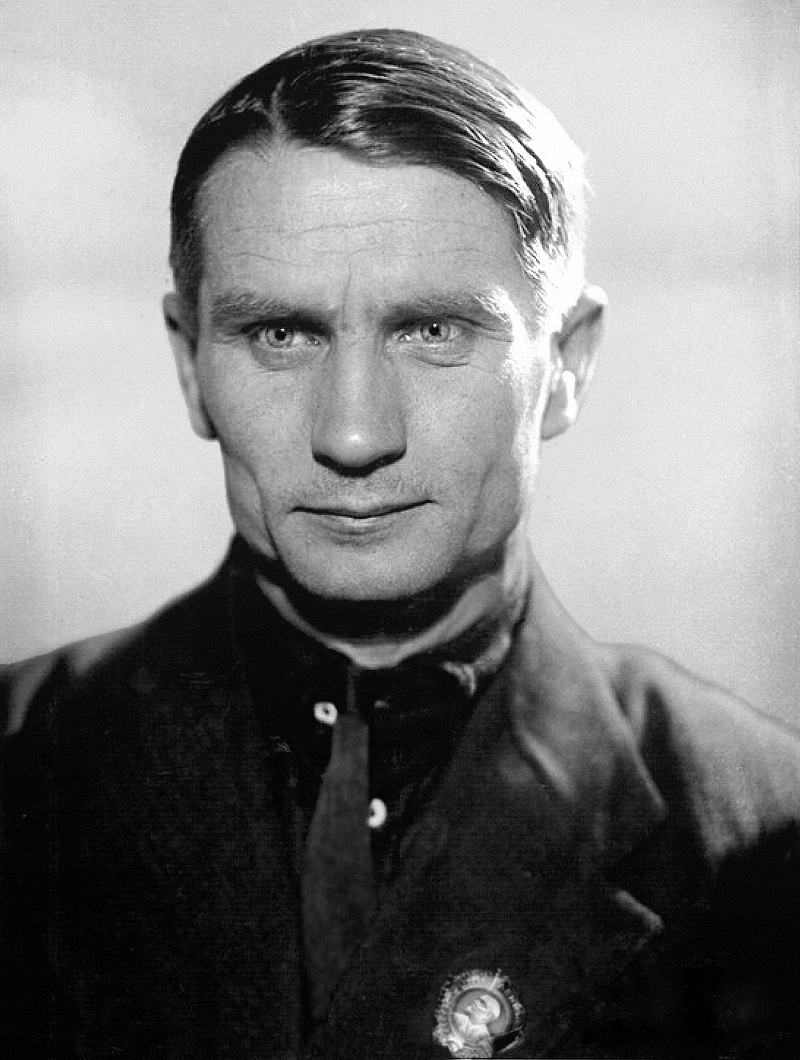
Lysenko

- Trofim Lysenko, whose opinions on genetics and biology held Soviet research isolated from the rest of the world scientific community, was dismissed from his position as Director of the Institute of Genetics at the Soviet Academy of Sciences. Lysenko, who had been made Director in 1940 by Joseph Stalin, was removed after Academy Director Mstislav Keldysh condemned his policies.
- At a press conference in Paris, French President Charles de Gaulle called for an end to the Bretton Woods system that had been in force since 1958, and a worldwide return to the gold standard. Over the next two years, de Gaulle would lobby for transfer payments between nations to be made in gold and would ultimately abandon the idea in favor of closer cooperation with France's European partners.
- Queen Elizabeth II of the United Kingdom was given the "Freedom of the City" honor (referred to in the United States as the "key to the city") in a ceremony at Addis Ababa City Hall during her visit to Ethiopia.
- The Confederation of British Industry was founded.
- Died: J. B. Danquah, 69, Ghanaian independence leader who had run for president against Kwame Nkrumah, died of a heart attack while in solitary confinement at Medium Prison in Nsawam.

== February 5, 1965 (Friday) ==
- Prime Minister Zhou Enlai of the People's Republic of China hosted Prime Minister Alexei Kosygin of the Soviet Union at a banquet, in the first visit by a Soviet leader to China since a rift had developed between the two Communist nations. Kosygin then departed Beijing the next day for a visit to North Vietnam.
- The Walt Disney studio bought the Disneyland theme park along with the WED Enterprises name.
- Born: Gheorghe Hagi, Romanian soccer football midfielder, Romanian national team starter from 1983 to 2000 and participant in three World Cups; in Săcele
- Died: Irving Bacon, 71, American character actor in 509 films and 33 television series over a 50-year period

== February 6, 1965 (Saturday) ==
- All 87 persons aboard LAN Chile Flight 107 were killed when the DC-6B airliner crashed into the Andes Mountains, a few minutes after taking off from Santiago in Chile to Buenos Aires in Argentina. The dead included 22 players and staff of Santiago's Antonio Varas soccer football team, who were on their way to Uruguay for a match against the Camadeo team in Montevideo; the DC-6B plane was only 20 minutes into its flight, and at an altitude of 13,000 feet (4,000 m), when it struck the dormant San Jose volcano.
- Congolese Prime Minister Moise Tshombe and Belgian Foreign Minister Paul-Henri Spaak signed an agreement in Brussels, with Belgium paying off $250 million worth of interest on Congo's pre-independence debts of nearly one billion dollars. In return, Congo would compensate the Belgian owners of mines that had been nationalized by the government. "From today, the Congo is independent", Tshombe told reporters, adding "We will achieve our program of economic reconstruction."
- Partap Singh Kairon, the former Chief Minister of the Indian state of Punjab, was assassinated after meeting with Prime Minister Shastri. Kairon, who had been a leader of the Punjabi independence movement in India, was being driven from Delhi on his way back to his home at Amritsar. He was passing through the village of Resni when four men with rifles attacked his car, killing him, his chauffeur, his private secretary and a former state cabinet aide.
- Five days after his 50th birthday, Sir Stanley Matthews became the oldest person ever to play a game in England's highest-level soccer Football League, when he assisted Stoke City in its 5–1 win at home over Fulham. Matthews, who had been knighted earlier as part of the New Year Honours, had made his debut for Stoke City almost 33 years earlier, in March, 1932, and retired from competition after the game.
- Soviet Prime Minister Alexei Kosygin arrived in Hanoi for a state visit to North Vietnam.

== February 7, 1965 (Sunday) ==
- McGeorge Bundy, National Security Advisor to U.S. President Lyndon B. Johnson, delivered a memorandum, "Re: A Policy of Sustained Reprisal", that followed up on his January 27 recommendation that the United States begin the bombing of North Vietnam. In the second statement, Bundy told the President, "We believe that the best available way of increasing our chance of success in Vietnam is the development and execution of a policy of sustained reprisal against North Vietnam... Once a program of reprisals is clearly underway, it should not be necessary to connect each specific act against North Vietnam to a particular outrage in the South..." Although Bundy conceded the odds of success "may be somewhere between 25% and 75%", he added, "What we can say is that even if it fails, the policy will be worth it. At a minimum it will damp down the charge that we did not do all that we could have done, and this charge will be important in many countries, including our own." Author Charles Lemert would later comment, "Bundy's sustained reprisal memorandum defined Johnson's fatal policy. By December 1965, 200,000 troops had replaced the 20,000 or so advisers in Vietnam at the beginning of the year. And by 1968 Johnson's presidency and his Great Society program would be in ruins..."
- Lester Maddox closed his popular Pickrick Restaurant in Atlanta, one day after he had begrudgingly announced that he would relent to a court order and serve African-American customers, rather than face a daily $200 fine for contempt of court. At noon, when a young black man named Jack Googer arrived to be the first customer, Maddox announced that he was closing the business. "I cannot betray my vow to my God" (to not serve Negro customers), he told reporters. "Dollars are unimportant to me." Maddox then placed a sign on the door, announcing that the Pickrick was "out of business, resulting from an act passed by the U.S. Congress, signed by President Johnson and inspired and supported by deadly and bloody Communism."
- The Broadway musical Kelly, with lyrics by Eddie Lawrence and music by Mark Charlap, had its opening night performance at the Broadhurst Theatre and then closed, making history as the most expensive Broadway failure up to that time. The loss to investors in 1965 was $650,000, equivalent to almost $4.9 million fifty years later.
- A mortar and small arms attack by the Viet Cong, on the Camp Holloway U.S. station adjacent to the airport at Pleiku, killed eight American advisers and wounded 126 others. The attackers also destroyed six Huey helicopters and a Caribou transport plane and damaged 15 other aircraft.
- President Johnson responded by launching Operation Flaming Dart, sending 49 U.S. Navy bombers to bomb North Vietnamese army barracks in Đồng Hới and other targets around North Vietnam's Gulf of Tonkin.
- Born: Chris Rock, African-American comedian; in Andrews, South Carolina
- Died:
  - Lee Hoi-chuen, 64, Chinese opera singer and film actor; father of Hong Kong-American martial artist and actor Bruce Lee
  - Nance O'Neil, 90, American stage and silent film actress nicknamed "the American Bernhardt"

== February 8, 1965 (Monday) ==
- Twenty-four Republic of Vietnam Air Force bombers, personally led by General Nguyễn Cao Kỳ, crossed from South Vietnam and struck targets in and around the Quảng Bình Province of North Vietnam, and the crews returned to a heroes' welcome. The act became symbolic of South Vietnam's determination to fight for its own defense against Communism, and contributed to President Johnson's decision at a meeting of his National Security Council later that day. Thereafter, sustained bombing of North Vietnam would become a "continuing action" rather than one of occasional reprisals. Support in the United States for an increased fight in Vietnam was evident from newspapers reporting on Operation Flaming Dart. The Washington Post said in an editorial the next day, "withdrawal from South Vietnam would not gain peace, but only lead to another war", and added, "The United States Government has taken the only course available to it, if it does not wish to surrender."
- All 84 people on board Eastern Air Lines Flight 663 were killed when the plane crashed into the Atlantic Ocean, moments after taking off from New York's John F. Kennedy International Airport. The Eastern Airlines flight was forced to make an unusually steep turn in order to avoid a collision with an incoming airliner, Pan Am Flight 212. The doomed plane, a Douglas DC-7B, went down approximately 7 miles (11 km) away off the coast of Long Island's Jones Beach State Park.
- The city of Empire, Oregon, population 3,917, ceased to exist and became part of Coos Bay, making Coos Bay the largest city on the Oregon coast. Voters in Empire had approved the merger and the surrender of their city charter on December 7, 1964, by a vote of 463 to 387, while Coos Bay residents had approved the merger overwhelmingly on January 8, 1965, by a margin of 1,329 to 181.
- On the same day as the Eastern Air Lines crash, a Scandinavian Airlines DC-7 burst into flames as it was attempting to take off from Tenerife in the Canary Islands on a flight to Copenhagen. All 91 people aboard were evacuated, 84 of them uninjured, just prior to the plane being consumed by flames.
- The Manned Spacecraft Center announced the selection of L. Gordon Cooper, Jr., as command pilot and Charles Conrad, Jr., as pilot for the seven-day Gemini 5 mission. The backup crew was announced as Neil A. Armstrong and Elliot M. See, Jr.
- Queen Elizabeth II of the United Kingdom continued her African state visit, moving on from Ethiopia, where her host was Emperor Haile Selassie, to Sudan, where she was greeted by President al-Mahi.
- Born: Dicky Cheung (stage name for Cheung Wai-kin), Cantopop singer and actor; in Hong Kong
- Died: Wayne Estes, 21, American college basketball star for Utah State University, was killed in a freak accident less than two hours after leading a 91–62 win over Denver University and scoring 48 points (including the 2000th point of his career). As he walked back to campus, he brushed against a high voltage wire that had been knocked down by a car, and was electrocuted. At the time of his death, Estes was the second-most prolific scorer in major college basketball, averaging 33.7 points a game behind Rick Barry but head of Bill Bradley, and was considered to be a likely first round NBA draft pick.

== February 9, 1965 (Tuesday) ==
- As the U.S. bombing of North Vietnam continued, the People's Republic of China issued a statement that, "We warn U.S. imperialism: You are overreaching yourselves in trying to extend the war with your small forces in Indochina, Southeast Asia, and the Far East. To be frank, we are waiting for you in battle array." On the same day, U.S. National Security Adviser McGeorge Bundy told Senator Mike Mansfield that the Johnson administration "was willing to run the risk of a war with China" if an invasion of North Vietnam was deemed necessary.
- A mob of about 3,000 Asian and Russian students who were protesting against the American bombing of North Vietnam attacked the U.S. Embassy in Moscow. Two reporters, Adam Clymer of The Baltimore Sun and Bernard Ullman of the Agence France-Presse news agency, were injured, and more than 200 windows in the ten-story building were shattered before Moscow police intervened.
- The first twenty of 1,819 wives and children of South Vietnam-based American civilian and military personnel departed that nation, by order of President Johnson. The rest, including the dependents of Ambassador Maxwell Taylor and General William Westmoreland, would depart over the next 15 days.
- Voting began for the next president of the 1.2 million member United Steelworkers of America (USWA) labor union, at 3,300 union offices, plants and other locations. In a close election, I. W. Abel defeated incumbent President David J. McDonald by only 6,228 votes.
- President Tito of Yugoslavia was awarded the Grand Star of the Decoration for Services to the Republic of Austria.
- Born: Omar Yaghi, Jordanian-born Palestinian and American chemist who received the 2025 Nobel Prize in Chemistry, which he shared with Richard Robson and Susumu Kitagawa, for his pioneering work in reticular chemistry;;in Amman
- Died: Khan Bahadur Ahsanullah, 91, Bengali educator who assisted in the formation of the University of Dhaka; the Ahsanullah University of Science and Technology, founded in 1995 by the Dhaka Ahsania Mission that he had established, would be named in his honor.

== February 10, 1965 (Wednesday) ==
- The first "one-shot" vaccine against the measles was made available to American physicians, the day after its approval by the U.S. Food and Drug Administration. Although vaccinations against the measles had first been introduced in the U.S. in 1963, they had required children to receive several injections in order for immunity against the virus to be obtained. The new measles shot, using a greatly-weakened strain of the measles virus, was 99% effective in providing a lifelong immunity to the illness.
- Three days after their attack on the U.S. Army barracks at Pleiku, the Viet Cong staged an attack on another barracks at Qui Nhơn, killing 23 American soldiers, two VC and seven civilians leading to even heavier U.S. air strikes against North Vietnam. McGeorge Bundy would tell a reporter later, "Pleikus are like streetcars", in that it could be expected that after each incident, the U.S. could expect that another one would arrive when the time was right.
- Died: Admiral Arthur C. Davis, 71, naval aviation pioneer who perfected dive bombing techniques

== February 11, 1965 (Thursday) ==
- India's Prime Minister Lal Bahadur Shastri announced that his government was abandoning plans, announced on January 26, to have Hindi replace English as the nation's official language. The decision followed more than two weeks of rioting in southern India and the deaths of over 100 people in clashes with police. "For an indefinite period", Shastri said in a nationwide address, "I would have English an associate language... I do not wish the people of the non-Hindi areas to feel that certain doors of advancement are closed to them." The "indefinite period" never expired, and India would later have 23 official languages, with English as the lingua franca.
- On his way back to Moscow from Hanoi, Soviet Prime Minister Alexei Kosygin stopped in Beijing for the second time in less than a month, and met with China's Communist Party General Secretary, Mao Zedong, with a suggestion that the two nations help the United States to "find a way out of Vietnam" that would end the continuing war there; Mao's response was a warning that the Soviets should not use Vietnam as a bargaining issue in negotiations with the U.S., and refused to agree.
- Operation Flaming Dart II began as 99 U.S. Navy carrier aircraft attacked enemy logistics and communications at Chanh Hoa barracks in southern North Vietnam near the DMZ.

== February 12, 1965 (Friday) ==
- Yaroslav Golovanov, the science editor for the Soviet youth newspaper Komsomolskaya Pravda, was approved for cosmonaut training for the Soviet space program, along with two other journalists with engineering backgrounds, Mikhail Rebrov of the Defense Ministry newspaper Krasnaya Zvezda and Yuri Letunov of Gosteleradio, the government-owned radio network. After the death a year later of their mentor, Soviet space program chief Sergei Korolev, the three were dropped from the program. It would not be until 25 years later, in 1990, that a member of the press, Toyohiro Akiyama of the Tokyo Broadcasting System, would become the first journalist to be launched into outer space.
- Plans for the U.S. Head Start program, for early education for underprivileged children, were given massive publicity by Lady Bird Johnson, the First Lady, when she hosted prominent women as guests for a tea party at the White House. Women from business and entertainment were invited, along with the wives of high-ranking federal government officials, the wives of some state governors, and a few men, "primarily church leaders". Mrs. Johnson addressed the need for early education for all preschoolers, and the reporting of her party on the "society pages" of newspapers brought a favorable response for Head Start and for the War on Poverty.
- OCAM (Organization Commune Africaine et Malgache), the African and Malagasy Common Organization, was formed at Nouakchott, Mauritania, as a successor to the Afro-Malagasy Union for Economic Cooperation (Union Africaine et Malgache de Coopération Économique; UAMCE), formerly the African and Malagasy Union (Union Africaine et Malgache; UAM)). The 13 initial members were all former French colonies (Cameroon, the Central African Republic, Congo-Brazzaville, Dahomey, Gabon, the Ivory Coast, Madagascar, Mauritania, Niger, Senegal, Togo and Upper Volta).
- The refueling reactor on the Soviet nuclear submarine K-11 became overheated and exploded, causing radiation contamination but no deaths. A furfurol-based polymer would be used to seal the reactor, which would then be dumped into the Abrosimova fjord in the Kara Sea within the Arctic Ocean, at a depth of 20 metres (66 ft).
- Twenty-nine activists set out on the Aboriginal Freedom Ride to protest against racial discrimination in Australia.
- Christopher C. Kraft, Jr., NASA's Director of Flight Operations told the Manned Spacecraft Center staff that the Gemini 3 mission might be flown between March 22 and 25, ahead of its scheduled launch in April, May or June. Kraft was right, and Gemini 3 was launched on March 23.
- Born: Mia Frye, American choreographic dancer; in New York City
- Died: John Hays Hammond Jr., 76, American electrical engineer and inventor of radio control for remote guidance of missiles, unmanned combat vehicles, drones and other "RC" devices.

== February 13, 1965 (Saturday) ==
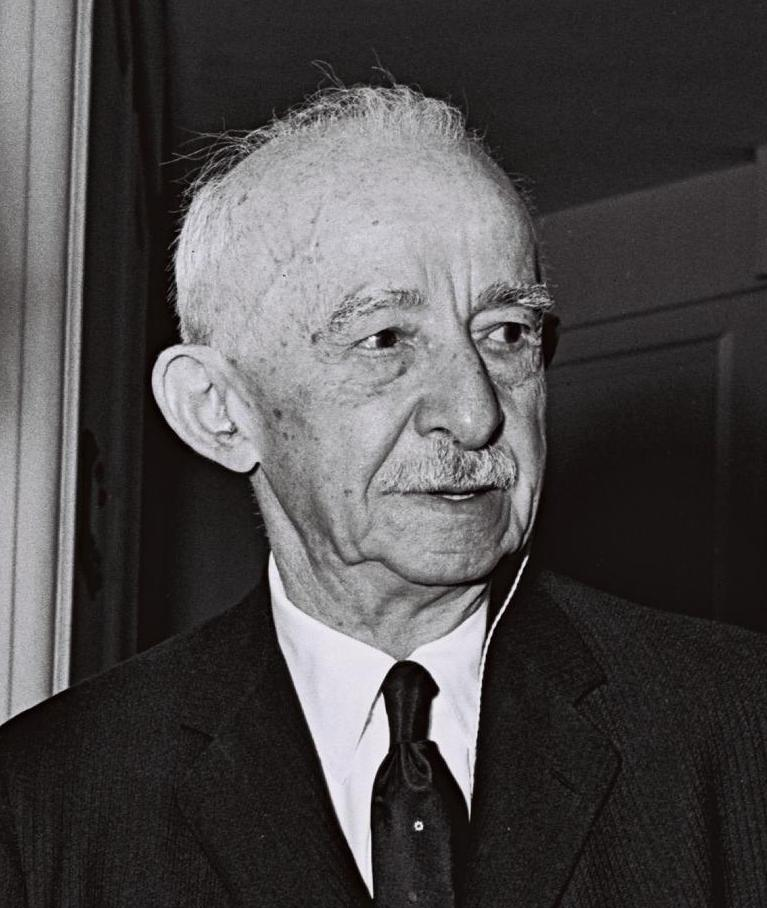
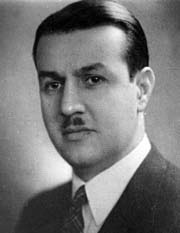
İsmet İnönü and Suat Hayri Ürgüplü
- By a margin of 225 to 197, İsmet İnönü, the longtime leader of Turkey as president and later as Prime Minister, lost a vote of no confidence in the Turkish National Assembly and was forced to resign. Suat Hayri Ürgüplü would form a new government on February 20.
- Congolese military aircraft bombed the villages of Paidha and Goli, Uganda, located on the African nation's border with the Democratic Republic of the Congo, prompting Ugandan Prime Minister Milton Obote to activate all former Ugandan Army members and to call on the citizens to defend the country. In response to the Ugandan charges, the Congo government in Leopoldville said that Ugandan troops had assisted Congolese rebels in attacking the Congolese town of Mahagi on February 5. By the end of the year, the Ugandan Army would more than double in size, to 4,500 men.
- U.S. President Lyndon B. Johnson agreed with advisers that a campaign of sustained reprisal in air strikes against North Vietnam would be necessary in order to end the war there. The attacks, described officially as "a program of measured and limited air action jointly" with South Vietnam, would be ordered by the President on February 24 as Operation Rolling Thunder, and would begin on March 2, the first of many over the rest of the decade.
- King Hussein chose Wasfi al-Tal as the new Prime Minister of Jordan. Hussein dismissed Bahjat Talhouni from the job after concluding that Talhuni had conceded too much in summits with Egypt's President Nasser, and chose al-Tal, who was "anti-Egyptian and "anti-PLO".
- American members of the International Longshoremen's Association returned to work after reaching a settlement in their 33-day-long strike, which had started on January 11.
- Nicholas Katzenbach was sworn in as U.S. Attorney General.
- Died:
  - General Humberto Delgado, 58, a former Portuguese Air Force commander who had been exiled and was an opponent of the regime of Portugal's dictator, António de Oliveira Salazar, was kidnapped and murdered by PIDE secret police forces near the border town of Olivenza. Murdered also was Delgado's Brazilian secretary, Arajaryr Moreira de Campo.
  - Gloria Morgan Vanderbilt, 60, Swiss-born American socialite and mother of Gloria Vanderbilt

== February 14, 1965 (Sunday) ==
- A qualifying match in the 1965 African Cup of Nations football tournament between Kenya and Ethiopia was awarded to Ethiopia as a walkover, after the Confederation of African Football (CAF) upheld a protest by Ethiopia because Kenya had fielded two players, Moses Wabwayi and Stephen Baraza, who were ineligible because they had represented Uganda previously. Ethiopia qualified and the two players were suspended for one year after Uganda stated that they were still registered with the Uganda F.A.
- The home of African American civil rights advocate Malcolm X (who used the surname Shabazz), in the Elmhurst neighborhood of Queens, New York City, was firebombed by Molotov cocktails while he, his wife and their four children were inside. The family escaped unharmed, but the house was seriously damaged; Malcolm X would be assassinated a week later.

== February 15, 1965 (Monday) ==
- Methamphetamine inhalers, formerly available in the United States as an over-the-counter drug, were barred from sale by the U.S. Food and Drug Administration (FDA) except by doctor prescription. In announcing the new rules, FDA Commissioner George P. Larrick said that he had received 153 reports of meth abuse in 1964, compared with 54 in 1963 and only five a year in 1960, 1961 and 1962.
- Cyrus Vance, the Deputy U.S. Secretary of Defense, ordered the Departments of the Army and the Air Force to amend their regulations regarding individual state National Guard units, so as to prevent any racial discrimination as a requirement of association with the U.S. military. Such regulations were ordered to be implemented "to ensure that the policy of equal opportunity and treatment is clearly stated"; the new requirements would be quickly accepted by the states, and by the end of 1965, there would not be a single segregated national guard unit in any of the fifty states.
- TWW, the independent British television network covering south Wales and west England, inaugurated its new service, reviving the Teledu Cymru broadcasting that had halted a year earlier. Local programming, including Welsh music and some Welsh-language shows, was directed on four channels at St Hilary, near Cardiff (Channel 7), Preseli (Channel 8), Arfon (Channel 10) and Moel-y-Parc (near Wrexham) (Channel 11).
- Three prominent public officials of the Republic of the Congo— Joseph Pouabou (Chief Justice of the Supreme Court of the Congo), Lazare Matsocota (Attorney General and chief prosecutor), and Massouémé Anselme (Director of the Congolese Information Agency)— were kidnapped from Brazzaville and murdered.
- The new United Artists epic film The Greatest Story Ever Told, starring Max von Sydow as Jesus Christ, premièred at the Warner Cinerama Theatre in New York City. Despite an all-star cast including Charlton Heston (as John the Baptist), Sidney Poitier (as Simon of Cyrene), Robert Blake (as Simon the Zealot), David McCallum (as Judas Iscariot), Telly Savalas (as Pontius Pilate), Martin Landau (as Caiaphas), (Claude Rains as King Herod), and John Wayne, Shelley Winters, and other well-known actors in smaller roles, the film did poorly at the box office.
- A new red and white maple leaf design was inaugurated as the flag of Canada, replacing the Union Flag and the Canadian Red Ensign. At noon, the new banner was raised first on the Peace Tower of the Parliament Building in Ottawa.
- In Sofia, an angry mob of 300 students broke through a cordon of 100 police who were protecting the American legation to Bulgaria and wrecked the first floor of the building.

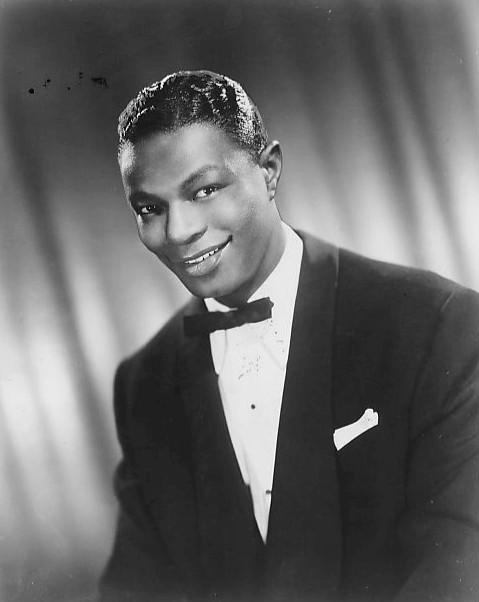
Nat King Cole in 1952

- Died: Nat King Cole, 45, American singer and jazz pianist, died from lung cancer.

== February 16, 1965 (Tuesday) ==
- Flying along the coast of central South Vietnam, 1st Lt. James S. Bowers, a United States Army officer flying a MEDEVAC helicopter, spotted and sank an enemy naval trawler camouflaged with trees and bushes. The 130-foot (40 m) North Vietnamese trawler, "Vessel 143", was sunk, leading to the discovery of 100 tonnes (98 long tons; 110 short tons) of Soviet and Chinese-made war material, including 3,500 to 4,000 rifles and submachine guns, one million rounds of small arms ammunition, 1,500 grenades, 2,000 mortar rounds, and 500 pounds (230 kg) of explosives. News of the event was summarized in a U.S. State Department White Paper, released to the press at month's end, titled Aggression from the North: The Record of North Viet-Nam's Campaign to Conquer South Viet-Nam; in the opinion of one war historian, "The position paper was clearly designed to justify a U.S. military response" which would come in the form of increased bombing of North Vietnam.
- The first Pegasus satellite was launched by the United States to determine the extent of potential damage in orbit by micrometeoroids. Once in orbit, Pegasus unfolded wings "to a span greater than a four-engine airliner" in order to provide "a huge target for the tiny, almost invisible particles it seeks to catch". All strikes were recorded on a data collector. As the third largest satellite up to that time, Pegasus was visible at night as a pinpoint of light as it passed over an area within its orbit.
- Frank McNamee, the Chief Justice of the Supreme Court of Nevada, was found near death in his apartment near Lake Tahoe, after apparently being severely beaten by a robber. Phillippe Denning would be arrested at a St. Louis bus station the next day with stolen items, and would later be convicted of attempted murder. McNamee would never recover from his head injuries, and would pass away three years later.
- Radio Moscow, the official English-language broadcasting station of the Soviet Union, warned that American bombing raids on North Vietnam could lead to a world war. "The flames of war starting in one place could easily spread to neighboring countries and, in the final count, embrace the whole world", the broadcast noted, and admonished that "responsibility for the dire consequences of such a policy rests with America."
- U.S. Navy divers Fred Jackson and John Youmans were killed in a decompression chamber fire at the Experimental Diving Unit in Washington, D.C., shortly after additional oxygen was added to the chamber's atmospheric mix.
- Phan Huy Quát was sworn in as the new civilian Prime Minister of South Vietnam, although effective control of the nation remained with two generals, Nguyễn Văn Thiệu and Nguyễn Cao Kỳ.
- The Rolling Stones concluded their Far East Tour (which was commenced on January 22) with a concert at Badminton Hall, Singapore.
- Aboriginal activists in Australia conducted a sit-in to challenge de facto segregation of a Sydney hotel.

== February 17, 1965 (Wednesday) ==
- U.S. Senator Frank Church of Idaho became the first member of Congress to begin an open debate about American involvement in Vietnam, delivering a speech titled "We Are in Too Deep in Asia and Africa", based on an article that he had written for The New York Times Magazine. Of him, it would be written later, "no senator had a longer career of opposition to the Vietnam War or a greater impact on American foreign policy than Frank Church."
- Academy Award-winning actress Patricia Neal suffered two near-fatal strokes at the age of 39, shortly after coming home for the day from filming of the movie 7 Women, and was rushed into emergency brain surgery. After being in a coma for weeks, she survived, and, on August 4, would give birth to the daughter she had been carrying, Lucy Dahl. After years of recovery, Neal would return to acting.
- The U.S. Department of Defense reported a record number of American casualties for the week of February 14 to February 20. The 37 Americans killed were more than had died in the first two years of American involvement in Vietnam; 32 had died in 1961 and 1962. Twenty-three of the men killed had died in the bombing of the Qui Nhơn barracks.
- A bomb blast in Vatican City heavily damaged the building occupied by the Swiss Guard, bodyguards for the Pope. Actor Claudio Volonté, the brother of Gian Maria Volonte, producer of the controversial play The Deputy, was arrested the next day and charged with being one of the two younger men who had planted the bomb.
- The lunar probe Ranger 8 was launched from Cape Kennedy. The photographs it transmitted would help select landing sites for future Apollo missions.
- Police clashed with 400 black students outside the Brooklyn Board of Education, as a boycott of New York City schools continued to grow.
- The Syrian government expelled U.S. diplomat Walter Snowdon, saying he had offered bribes for information to military officers.
- Born: Michael Bay, American film director; in Los Angeles
- Died:
  - Joan Merriam Smith, 28, American aviator who had made a solo flight around the world in 1964 along the 1937 flight plan of Amelia Earhart, but who finished second to Jerrie Mock, who was attempting the feat at the same time. Smith and magazine writer Trixie Anne Schubert, were killed when their Cessna 100 plane crashed and exploded on Blue Ridge in the San Gabriel Mountains in California.
  - Tadeusz Lehr-Spławiński, 73, Polish scholar and academician

== February 18, 1965 (Thursday) ==
Flag of Gambia

- Gambia, at 11,295 square miles (29,250 km^{2}) the smallest nation in Africa, became independent from the United Kingdom, with the lowering of the British Flag at midnight and the raising of the new Gambian flag at McCarthy Square in Bathurst (now Banjul). Sir Dawda Jawara continued as Prime Minister, and Sir John W. Paul, a British colonial administrator who had served as the Governor since 1962, became the first Governor-General of The Gambia. It would become a presidential republic on April 24, 1970, with Jawara as the first president. On July 22, 1994, after 29 years as a parliamentary democracy, the Gambia would be ruled by a military government. The nation, only 29 miles (47 km) wide and surrounded on all sides by the former French colony of Senegal, except for its coastline, would continue to have British support, with 25 British officers assisting transition as part of the nation's civil service.
- Archaeologist Margherita Guarducci announced in Rome that she had located and identified the remains of Saint Peter, the chief apostle of Jesus Christ. "Today, everything is clear", Guarducci told the Vatican press service. "The original tomb was empty because at the time of the Emperor Constantine, Peter's bones had been transferred to a secret place. This hiding place was inside a wall with inscriptions, which was then closed in the monument put up by Constantine in honor of the apostle." Shimon Bar-Yona, later designated as Simon Peter and honored as the first Pope of the Roman Catholic Church, was believed to have been crucified not long after the Great Fire of Rome in AD 64, and Guarducci concluded that the skeletal remains were those of an individual between the ages of 60 and 70.
- At 9:57 in the morning, an avalanche of snow buried the Leduc Camp in British Columbia, killing 27 copper miners working for the Newmont Mining Corporation and destroying several buildings. Another 42 of the 68 people buried were rescued on the same day, while a carpenter, Einar Myllyla, was saved three days later from the ruins of a collapsed building. "To their everlasting credit", author Jay Robert Nash would write later, "rescuers refused to abandon their search until every man in the camp had been accounted for."
- President Johnson hosted prominent American bankers and investment leaders (including David Rockefeller, Sidney Weinberg and Thomas S. Gates Jr.) at a White House meeting and asked them to voluntarily limit foreign lending in order to reduce the American balance of payments deficit. "The bankers acted against their own profit motives and for the economic strength of the United States", an author would later note, "possibly for the last time in American history..."
- Hastings Banda, the Prime Minister of Malawi and its Minister of Defence and Public Security, announced new regulations to increase his dictatorial power over the African nation. He designated a new group, the Malawi Young Pioneers, to be his "eyes and ears" in every village in Malawi, gave the police and his public security forces the power to detain suspects indefinitely, and authorized his agents to shoot suspected dissidents if they resisted arrest.
- Sinoite, which does not occur naturally on Earth, but which has been found in meteorites, was first identified as a distinct new mineral. A team of scientists working at Moffett Field in California said that the mineral, a silicon oxynitride, had been isolated from a meteorite that had fallen in Pakistan in 1926. The name itself was coined from the chemical designation (Si_{2}N_{2}O) and meteorite.
- In Marion, Alabama, Jimmie Lee Jackson, an unarmed African-American protester, was shot by an Alabama Highway Patrol trooper, James Bonard Fowler. Jimmie would succumb to his wounds eight days later.
- NASA's Associate Administrator for Manned Space Flight George E. Mueller briefly outlined the space agency's immediate post-Apollo objectives in testimony before the House Committee on Science and Astronautics during hearings on NASA's Fiscal Year 1966 budget. Mueller spoke about what the Apollo program would operate after achieving the goal of a manned lunar landing and "will enable us to produce space hardware and fly it for future missions at a small fraction of the original development cost" as part of what would become known as the Apollo Applications Program.
- Born:
  - Masaki Saito, Japanese baseball pitcher for the Tokyo Yomiuri Giants, three time winner of the Eiji Sawamura Award (similar to the Cy Young Award in the U.S.) and inductee to the Japanese Baseball Hall of Fame; in Kawaguchi, Saitama Prefecture
  - Dr. Dre (stage name for Andre Young), American rapper; in Compton, California

== February 19, 1965 (Friday) ==
- A coup was attempted in South Vietnam at 1:00 p.m. local time. Units of the Army of the Republic of Vietnam (ARVN) commanded by General Lâm Văn Phát and Colonel Phạm Ngọc Thảo launched the coup against the nation's head of state, General Nguyễn Khánh. Fifty tanks and a combination of infantry battalions, led by Colonel Dương Hiếu Nghĩa, seized control of the post office and radio station in Saigon, cutting off communication lines. The home of General Khanh, and Gia Long Palace, the residence of head of state Suu, were surrounded. The coup collapsed when the U.S., in collaboration with Generals Nguyễn Chánh Thi and Cao Văn Viên, assembled units hostile to both Khanh and the current coup into a Capital Liberation Force. Saigon was recaptured "without a shot" the next day by loyal troops, and Khanh was restored to power, but would remain in office only two more days.
- The U.S. Senate unanimously (72–0) approved the proposed Twenty-fifth Amendment to the U.S. Constitution, providing for appointment and confirmation to fill any vacancy in the office of Vice President of the United States, as well as allowing the Vice President to serve as Acting President if the incumbent was "unable to discharge the powers and duties of his office". The U.S. House of Representatives would approve the amendment, with changes, on April 13 by a vote of 368 to 29.
- At Luanda in the Portuguese West African colony of Angola, 27 children were fatally poisoned and six others in critical condition when they ate supper at the Sisters of the Misericordia orphanage. The deaths of the children, who ranged in age from 6 to 10 years old, were traced to insecticide used to prevent weevils from damaging beans served with the evening meal.
- U.S. President Johnson decided, after a meeting with his National Security Council, to make continuous and regular bombing strikes against North Vietnam. Robert S. McNamara, at the time the Secretary of Defense, would note later that Johnson refused to announce his decision publicly and that "This judgment would eventually cost him dearly."
- The massive Dutch cargo ship MV Sophocles caught fire and exploded when its cargo of fertilizer ignited, then sank in the Atlantic Ocean, drowning three of her crew of 44. Another Dutch ship, MV Ulysees, rescued the 41 survivors.
- Died: Forrest Taylor, 81, American character actor in film and television

== February 20, 1965 (Saturday) ==
- Ranger 8 photographed potential landing sites on the Moon for the Apollo program crewed missions before crashing into the surface. The probe "took a shallow trajectory that crossed the central highlands en route to the Sea of Tranquility, east of lunar meridian", the area favored by the constraints of Apollo's projected west to east orbit. As it steadily dropped in altitude, its cameras were turned on during the last 23 minutes of flight, and the probe transmitted 7,137 high resolution photos, gradually descending until it impacted, at 4:57 a.m. Eastern Standard Time, at a location 125 miles (201 km) east of the Sabine crater, "finally impacting 60 km [38 miles] northeast of where Apollo 11 would land four and a half years later."
- Over 5,000 students from the Central University of Madrid marched in a silent protest after a planned lecture on cultural repression was prohibited by the Rector. Despite the peaceful nature of the defense, police forcibly dispersed the marchers and seriously injured some of them. The harsh response would lead to even more protests, including a boycott of classes by 17,000 students at the University of Barcelona.
- The United Nations and Belgium entered into a global settlement of all claims brought by Belgian citizens for damages arising out of United Nations operations during the Congo Crisis, with $15 million paid by the international organization.
- At Luluabourg (later renamed Kananga), the Congolese National Convention was formed by 49 tribal organizations, in association with the CONAKAT political party led by Moïse Tshombe, in order to win the 1965 legislative elections.
- In Australia, Freedom Ride participants, including Charles Perkins, were ejected from the municipal swimming baths at Moree, New South Wales, after protesting against their segregationist policy of not admitting Aborigines.
- Suat Hayri Ürgüplü was named as the new Prime Minister of Turkey, to form an interim government until new elections for the National Assembly could be conducted on October 10.
- President Julius Nyerere concluded a visit to the People's Republic of China with the signing of the Chinese-Tanzanian Treaty of Friendship.

== February 21, 1965 (Sunday) ==
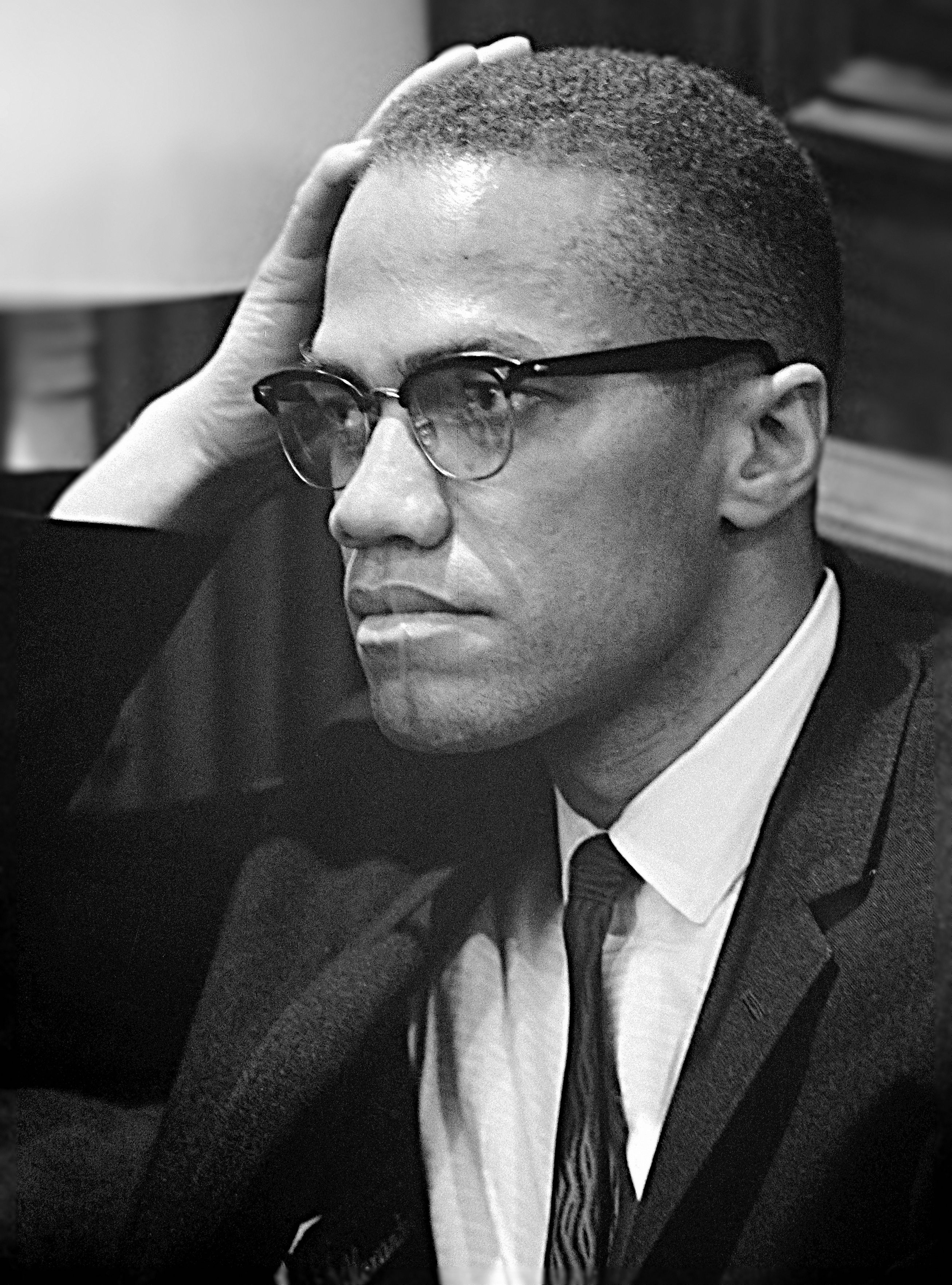
Malcolm X

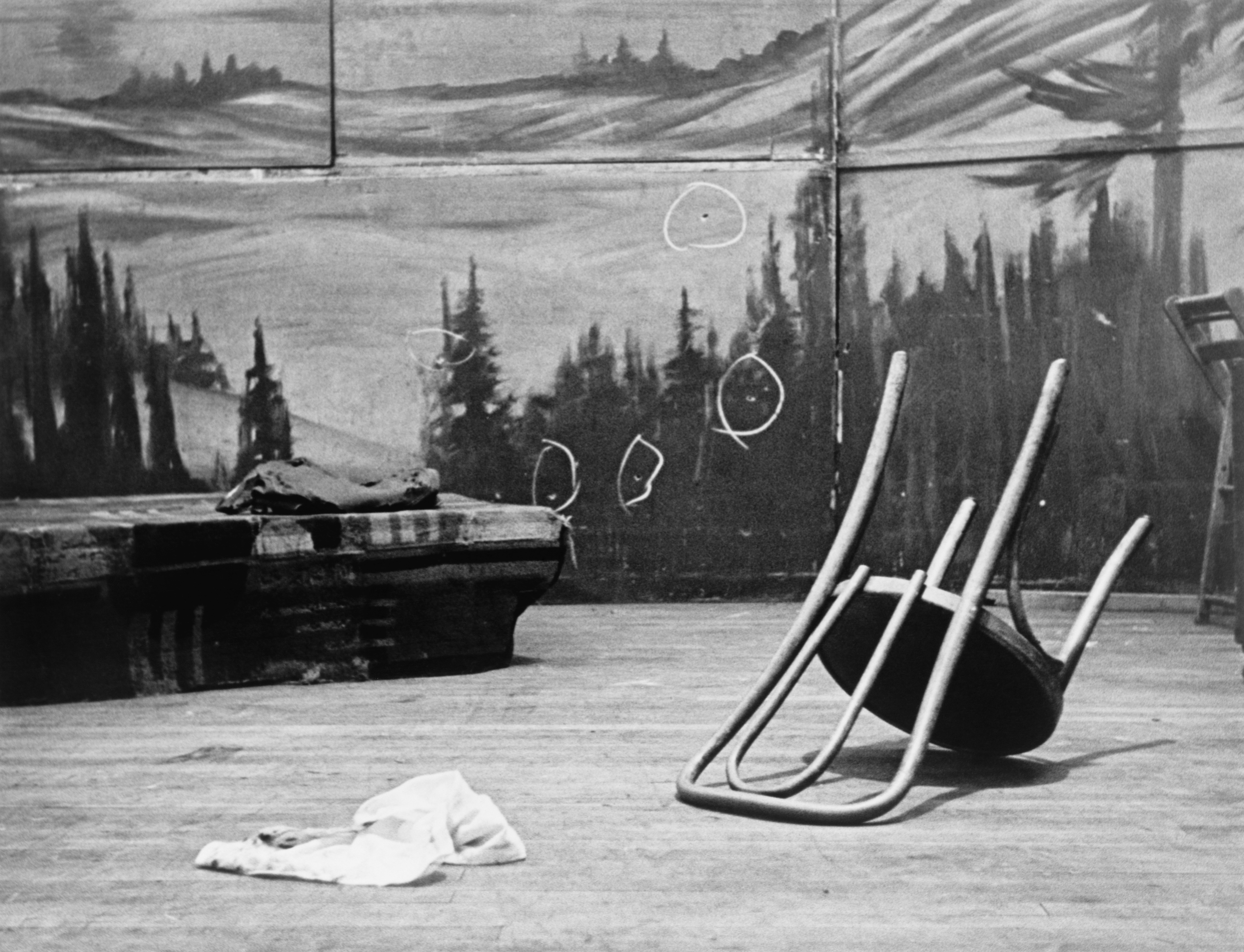
Bullet holes in the back of the Audubon Ballroom, where Malcolm X was shot

- Malcolm X was assassinated at Manhattan's Audubon Ballroom at 564 West 166th Street in Washington Heights. Shortly before 3:10 p.m., as he was preparing to deliver a speech to the Organization of Afro-American Unity, he opened with the greeting As-Salaam Alaikum and the audience acknowledged with Wa-Alaikum-Salaam. At that moment, a man in the crowd shouted "Nigger! Get your hand outta my pocket!" to a person sitting next to him, an apparent signal for four other spectators to stage a fight. Malcolm said, "Hold it. Let's cool it, brothers", and was shot in the chest by a man who approached the stage with a Luger pistol. As a second man fired from a sawed-off shotgun, a third fired multiple times with a pistol. In all, Malcolm X was shot 16 times at close range, and was pronounced dead at the nearby Vanderbilt Clinic at Columbia Presbyterian Hospital at 3:30 p.m. Although the myth persists that the identity of the assassins was "never determined", the third gunman, Thomas Hagan (a.k.a. Talmadge Hayer), was shot and wounded by one of Malcolm's bodyguards, arrested at the ballroom, and confessed to the crime. Two other men, Norman 3X Butler and Thomas 15X Johnson, would be arrested later and convicted of Malcolm's murder, although Hagan testified that they were not involved and may not have even been at the Audubon at all. Born as Malcolm Little in Omaha, Nebraska, in 1925, Malcolm X, described as "arguably the most important contributor to the Black Power movement and a leading figure in American history", died at the age of 39.
- The Soviet Union's ruling Communist Party announced a liberalization of its former policy of discouraging creativity and an end to what it described as former Secretary Nikita Khrushchev's campaign against the "intelligentsia". Speaking through Alexei M. Rumyantsev, then editor-in-chief of Pravda, the party issued a statement that "genuine scientific creativity" was "possible only under conditions of search and experiment, free expression and the clash of opinions... different schools and trends, different styles and genres, competing with each other and united at the same time by their common dialectical-materialistic outlook and unity of the principles of socialist realism." The policy, however, did not extend to free expression of criticism of the Communist Party's political decisions.
- East Germany's radio network confirmed that the Soviet Union was publicly acknowledging that Nazi German dictator Adolf Hitler had, as believed, committed suicide on April 30, 1945, by shooting himself in the head, and that Hitler's charred body had been identified beyond any doubt after its recovery from the burial site within the garden of the Chancellery in Berlin.
- The 15 generals comprising South Vietnam's High National Council — Nguyễn Văn Thiệu, Nguyen Van Cao and Nguyễn Cao Kỳ — voted to remove General Nguyễn Khánh from leadership as Prime Minister, and replaced him with a caretaker civilian premier, Trần Văn Hương.
- NASA officials announced that Vanguard 1, the American satellite launched on March 17, 1958, had finally stopped transmitting after nearly seven years, but that it would continue to orbit the Earth. No other satellite had continued to function for that period of time, and by transmitting data, it had "paid rich scientific dividends" during its operation, including "the startling fact that the earth is not round, but pear-shaped".
- The Gemini 3 crew began egress training from a capsule in the Gulf of Mexico. After half an hour of post-landing cockpit checks with the hatches closed, astronauts Virgil I. Grissom and John W. Young escaped through the command pilot's hatch after first heaving their survival kits into the water.

== February 22, 1965 (Monday) ==
- The Soviet Union launched the uncrewed Kosmos 57 space capsule in preparation of the Voskhod 2 crewed mission. In its first orbit, the capsule successfully tested its airlock, opening its outer hatch, then closing and pressurizing the interior. However, when space program director Nikolai Kamanin left the control room, "everything went terribly wrong"; the Tyuratam-based trackers and the ground stations lost contact with the Kosmos spacecraft as it entered its third orbit. They soon realized that the ship's automatic self-destruct system had somehow triggered and destroyed the spacecraft, which "was tracked in 168 detectable pieces, which re-entered Earth's atmosphere between 31 March and 6 April 1965."
- A new, revised, color production of Rodgers and Hammerstein's Cinderella was broadcast on American television by CBS, with Lesley Ann Warren making her TV debut in the title role. The show would become an annual tradition for eight years, last broadcast in 1974. Although panned by some critics, the first broadcast drew an estimated 70 million viewers.
- Prince Philip, Duke of Edinburgh, opened the Royal Australian Mint in Canberra. The Prince, husband of Queen Elizabeth II and a coin collector, "pushed two small green buttons to set in operation the minting of the first decimal coins" at the Australian Mint, and then picked one of the one-cent pieces from a wooden bowl to be placed in a proof set.
- The Black Arts Movement was launched by LeRoi Jones (later Amiri Baraka) at a press conference in New York City, the day after the assassination of Malcolm X. Jones's first project was BARTS, the Black Arts Movement Theater and School.
- U.S. Army General William C. Westmoreland requested the first American combat troops for South Vietnam, asking for 3,500 U.S. Marines from the 9th Marine Expeditionary Brigade, to be sent to guard the Da Nang Air Base.
- Israeli spy Ze'ev Gur-Aryeh, who posed as a West German businessman using his original German name of Wolfgang Lotz, was arrested in Egypt, along with his wife Waldrud.
- Died: Felix Frankfurter, 82, Austrian-born jurist who served as a U.S. Supreme Court justice from 1939 to 1962, died from a stroke.

== February 23, 1965 (Tuesday) ==
- The first naturally occurring neutrino was detected by a team of physicists, led by Frederick Reines of Case Western Reserve University in a project with the University of the Witwatersrand in South Africa, using a liquid scintillator at an underground laboratory within the Proprietary Gold Mine near Johannesburg. In accepting the Nobel Prize for Physics thirty years later, Reines explains that "natural" in this case meant "it did not arise from a man-made nuclear reactor", and that the team recorded 167 total events.
- The government of Syria executed two men convicted of spying for the United States. Farhan Atassi, a naturalized American citizen, was hanged in public at Al Marja Square in Damascus, and Syrian Army Colonel Abdel Moeen Hakimi was shot by a firing squad. Syria had accused both men of working for Walter Snowdon, the second secretary of the U.S. Embassy. Snowdon had been expelled from the country six days earlier.
- The remains of Irish nationalist Roger Casement, who had been executed by British authorities on August 3, 1916, after participating in the Easter Rising, were reburied in a state funeral in Glasnevin, Ireland. Casement's body had been buried in the Pentonville Prison in Great Britain after his hanging.
- MGM Studios announced that it would begin filming of Stanley Kubrick's science fiction movie, Journey Beyond the Stars, in Cinerama. Three years later, the film, retitled 2001: A Space Odyssey, would be released to theaters under a different wide-screen format, Super Panavision 70.
- Two mosques of the Nation of Islam, one in Harlem in New York City, and the other in San Francisco, were firebombed, in an apparent retaliation for the assassination two days earlier of Malcolm X. Six FDNY firemen were injured when the front of the Harlem mosque collapsed.
- The Beatles began filming of their movie Help! on New Providence island in the Bahamas.
- Born:
  - Michael Dell, American billionaire computer entrepreneur who founded the Dell computer company in 1984; in Houston
  - Kristin Davis, American actress and producer; in Boulder, Colorado
  - Sylvie Guillem, French ballet dancer; in Paris

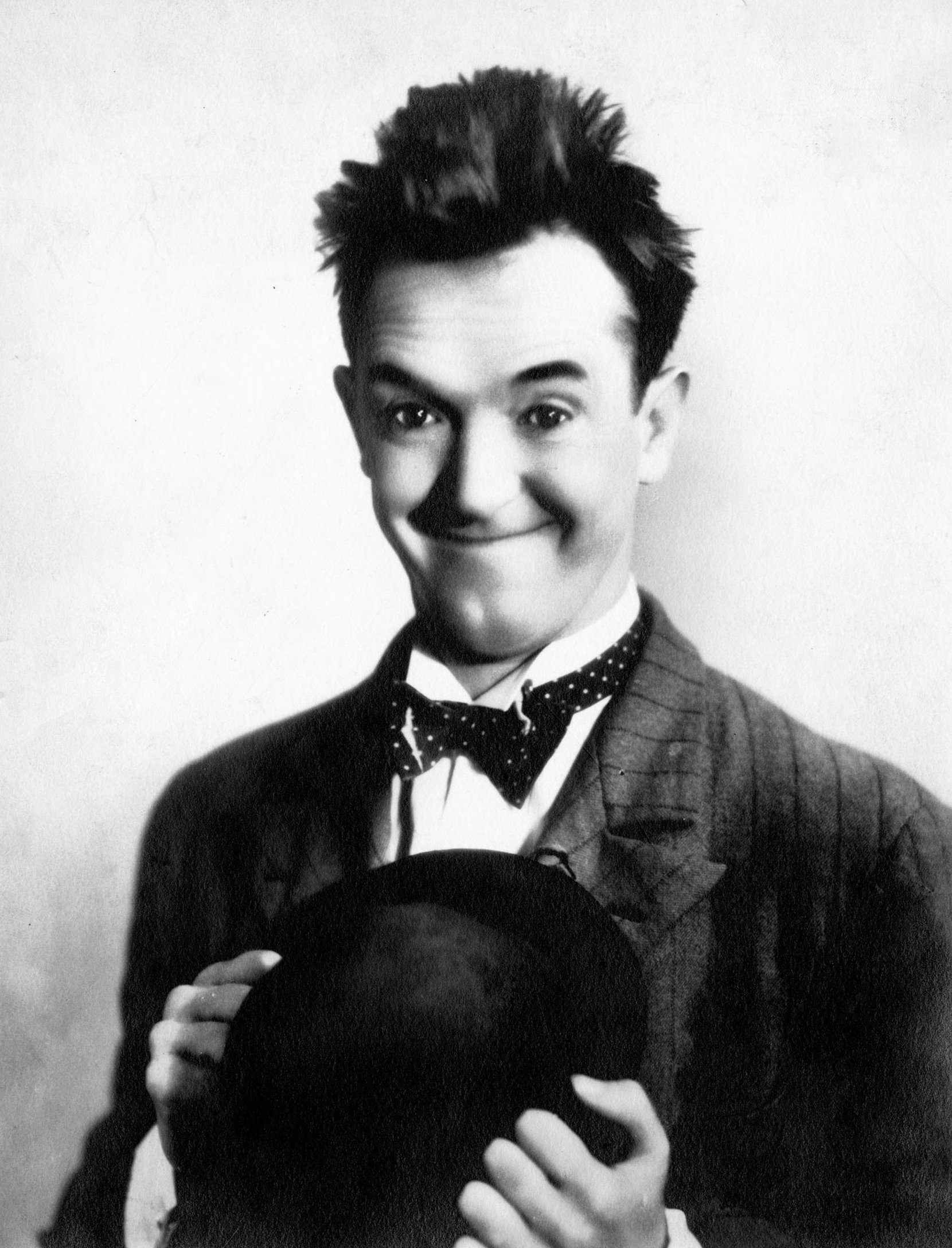
Stan Laurel c. 1920

- Died: Stan Laurel, 74, American film comedian and half of the duo of Laurel and Hardy, died of a heart attack almost eight years after the 1957 death of his partner, Oliver Hardy.

== February 24, 1965 (Wednesday) ==
- Paul Bellesen, who was both an African-American and Roman Catholic, lost his job as the Great Titan for the National Knights of the Ku Klux Klan for the state of Idaho, one day after he had received his membership card and had shown it to reporters. "I just figured they might do something like that", he told the press. Bellesen, the operator of a janitorial service in Nampa, Idaho, commented, "It was a great challenge to me to see just how secret the Klan is and if I could get in. I did." He noted that he had also applied to the Imperial Wizard of the United Ku Klux Klan, but that "He asked for my photograph." When Imperial Wizard James R. Venable received the news, his only comment was "His membership is hereby revoked." Bellesen admitted that he had signed a statement saying that he was a "white, Anglo-Saxon Protestant", but that "Being a Negro and supposedly unable to read anyway, I signed it.
- Spanish police attacked 5,000 University of Madrid students with batons and water hoses. According to one report, "A bugle sounded and hundreds of policemen jumped out of the jeeps with rubber truncheons drawn. The water hoses were turned on the students but they remained seated. When the bugle sounded again, the police charged, beating the students. Men and women students were hustled into the jeeps. Later, many of the students threw stones at the policemen. The police charge was believed to be one of the most brutal against students in Madrid since the Civil war."
- The cabinet of West Germany's Chancellor Ludwig Erhard reversed their previous decision of November 11 not to seek an extension of the statute of limitations on Nazi war crimes beyond May 8, 1965, the 20th anniversary of Germany's surrender. A feature of Germany's constitutions for the past century had been that indictments could not be made for any crime more than 20 years after it had been committed.
- Gaspar DiGregorio was identified by U.S. Department of Justice authorities as the new overlord of New York City's "Five Families" of the American Mafia. DiGregorio was summoned before a federal grand jury to answer for the October disappearance of Mafia boss Joseph Bonanno.
- Pio Gama Pinto, the publisher of the official newspaper of the Kenya African National Union political party and a member of the Kenyan House of Representatives, was shot and killed outside of his home in Nairobi.
- U.S. President Johnson gave the go-ahead orders for Operation Rolling Thunder, the continuing bombing of North Vietnam. By the end of 1965, there would be 55,000 missions flown.
- The Canadian province of New Brunswick adopted a new flag, shortly after the new national flag of Canada was inaugurated.
- Richard Rodney Bennett's first full-length opera, The Mines of Sulphur, premiered at Sadler's Wells Theatre, London.
- Born: Alessandro Gassman, Italian actor and son of Vittorio Gassman and Juliette Mayniel; in Rome

== February 25, 1965 (Thursday) ==
- In Meridian, Mississippi, federal judge William Harold Cox dismissed the felony indictments against 17 of the 18 men accused of the 1964 murders of Chaney, Goodman, and Schwerner, finding insufficient evidence of a conspiracy to deprive the victims of their rights. Misdemeanor charges remained in place for Neshoba County Sheriff Lawrence A. Rainey, Deputy Cecil Price, and a city policeman, Richard Willis, for "participating in a conspiracy under color of law to inflict summary punishment". The case would be appealed to the U.S. Supreme Court and proceed as United States v. Price. Seven defendants would eventually be convicted and would receive federal prison terms ranging from 3 to 10 years.
- In East Berlin, the Volkskammer of the German Democratic Republic (East Germany) passed the "Law on the Unified Socialist Educational System", setting common curricula for various levels, including pre-school education, a polytechnic high school with ten classes, vocational schools, preparatory classes for universities, engineering and technical colleges, liberal arts universities, and continuing education for workers and employees. Under the law, the unifying policy was that all students were "to be educated to love the GDR and to be proud of her social achievements and to be ready to place all their strength at the disposal of society, to strengthen the socialist state, and to defend it."
- A federal grand jury in Washington, D.C., brought criminal charges against the Communist Party USA (CPUSA) for failing to register its members as members of a subversive organization, as required by the Subversive Activities Control Act, with fines of up to $10,000 for each of 12 counts. The new indictment included the charge of declining to register "even though it knew there was a volunteer willing to register on behalf of the party." A federal appeals court had dismissed an earlier conviction against the CPUSA because registration would have violated the American constitutional right against self-incrimination.
- The National Association of Broadcasters issued restrictions on the format of U.S. television commercials for beer and wine, declaring that such advertising was "acceptable only when presented in the best of good taste and discretion"; conduct barred including "guzzling, smacking of lips, or bobbing of the adam's apple" so as to suggest the "quaffing" of alcohol.
- Rudie Liebrechts of the Netherlands broke the world record for the men's 3000 meter speed skating, finishing three kilometers (almost two miles) in less than four and a half minutes (4:26.8) in an event at the Bislett Stadion in Oslo, Norway. The old record had been held for a year by Estonian Ants Antson of the Soviet Union.
- The U.S. Federal Reserve Bank announced that the supply of gold decreased in January by $262 million.

== February 26, 1965 (Friday) ==
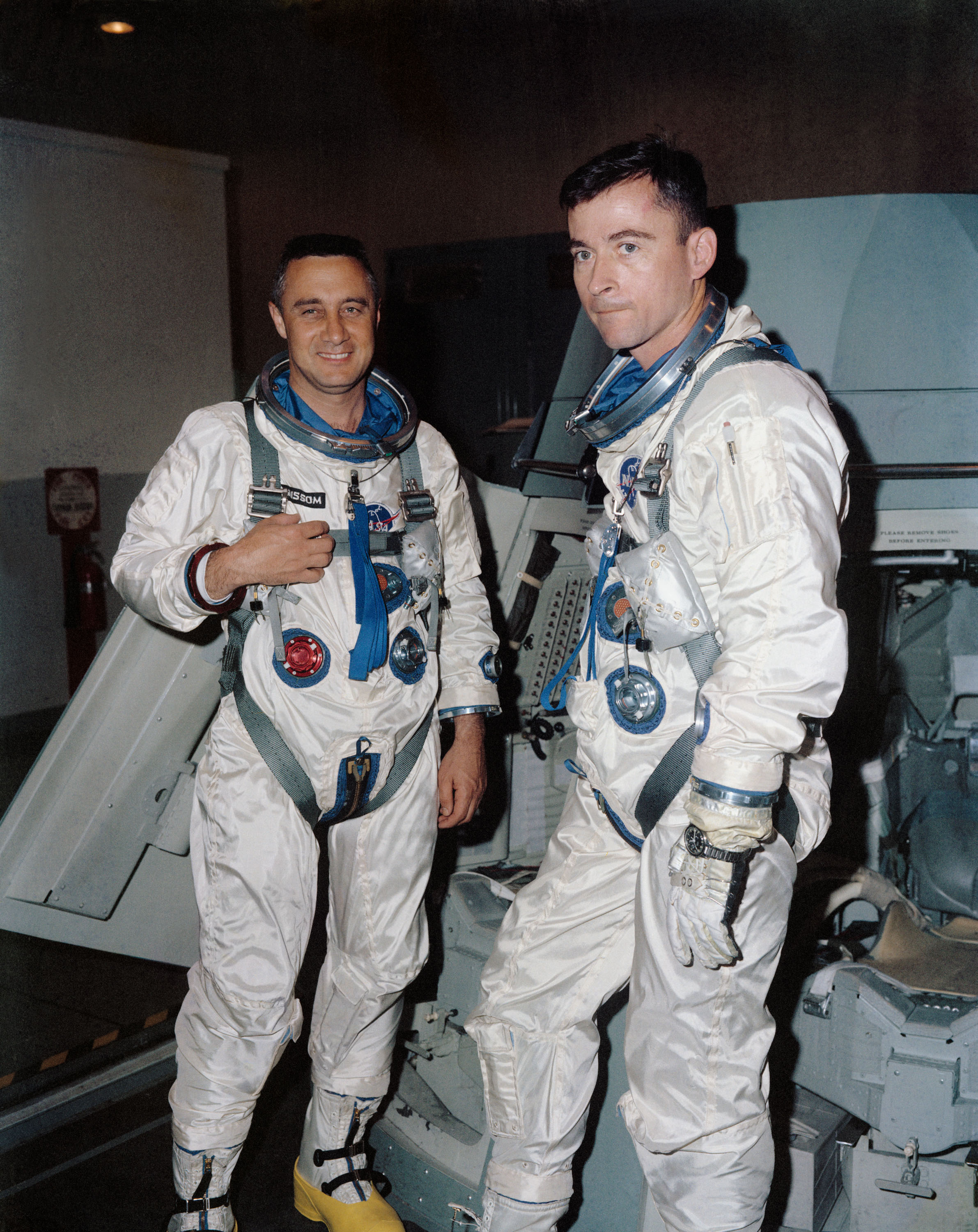
February 26, 1965: The Gemini 3 flight crew at NASA's Mission Control Center in Houston, Texas

- A full-scale rehearsal of the flight crew countdown for Gemini 3 was conducted at the launch site at Complex 16 at Cape Kennedy. Complete flight crew suiting operation in the ready room, the transfer to Complex 19, and crew ingress into the spacecraft were practiced. Practice countdown proceeded smoothly and indicated that equipment and procedures were flight ready.
- U.S. Navy Lt. (j.g.) Larry Cooper was killed after a surface-to-air missile shot down his A-4 Skyhawk attack plane off the coast of California. Cooper, who had taken off from the USS Midway, had inadvertently flown into a restricted zone during "Exercise Silver Lance". The American missile frigate USS Preble, operating 150 miles (240 km) southwest of San Diego, tracked his plane on radar and fired two Terrier missiles at him.
- François Perin established a new political party in Belgium, the Walloon Workers' Party, on the premise that the Kingdom of Belgium should be a federation between the French-speaking Walloons and the Dutch-speaking Flemings. During the party's brief existence, it would win one seat in Belgium's Chamber of Representatives and then merge with the Walloon Front on June 26.
- The European Social Charter, opened for signature on October 18, 1961, became effective on February 26, 1965, after West Germany had become the fifth nation (after Norway, Sweden, the United Kingdom and Ireland) to ratify it. By 1991, the Charter would be effective in 20 nations which had ratified it, and by 2011, there would be 43 parties to a Revised Charter.
- Norman 3X Butler was arrested at his home in the Bronx, and charged with being one of the three gunmen who had shot Malcolm X earlier in the week. The arrest was made on the basis of statements by three witnesses who said that Butler had been present at the Audubon Ballroom at the time.
- Died: Jimmie Lee Jackson, 26, African-American civil rights protester, died eight days after being shot in Selma, Alabama.

== February 27, 1965 (Saturday) ==
- The U.S. Department of State issued a white paper to the press, Aggression From the North: The Record of North Viet-Nam's Campaign to Conquer South Viet-Nam, as part of the U.S. government's effort to justify the escalation of the role of the United States in the Vietnam War. As a CIA employee and National Security Council staff member would note later, the paper "proved to be a dismal disappointment... the only hard information we had about North Vietnamese participation and supplies and so forth came from information that was much too highly classified to include, and the only information that was of sufficiently low classification was pretty thin gruel." Among other things, the paper asserted that "In Vietnam a Communist government has set out deliberately to conquer a sovereign people in a neighboring state... North Vietnam's commitment to seize control of the South is no less total than was the commitment of the regime in North Korea in 1950... the planners in Hanoi have tried desperately to conceal their hand. They have failed and their aggression is as real as that of an invading army."
- Without warning, all 47 West German military personnel in Tanzania withdrew from the African nation and flew home, after West Germany's cabinet decided to terminate military aid to the African nation in retaliation for Tanzania's opening of diplomatic relations with East Germany. "The effect of this forceful display was instantly undermined, however, by a brilliant gesture" by Tanzanian President Julius Nyerere, a historian would write later, who "proclaimed that since the Federal Republic was so insistent on abusing its military aid for political ends, his country would forgo all forms of West German aid... Nyerere's announcement resonated as an example of principled resistance to foreign manipulation." Since the West German decision was made at the same time as the visit of East German leader Walter Ulbricht to Egypt, the unintended consequence would be that Egypt and other nations in Africa and the Middle East would forge closer ties to West Germany's eastern enemy.
- In Paris, Paul Gérin-Lajoie, the Minister of Education for the French-speaking Canadian province of Quebec, signed an agreement on educational cooperation with the government of France. After Gérin-Lajoie returned to Canada, Quebec's Premier, Jean Lesage, presented the agreement "as a major advance in Quebec's quest for an international role". Paul Martin, Canada's Minister of External Affairs, would warn France's ambassador that "only Canada had the authority to speak for Canadians on the international stage", and that the Canadian government, not the Quebec provincial government, had the sole power to sign agreements with foreign nations.
- The Antonov An-22, nicknamed Antaeus and the largest turboprop airplane ever built, flew for the first time. The Soviet cargo plane could carry a payload of 85,000 tonnes (84,000 long tons; 94,000 short tons), had room for 290 passengers, and could reach speeds of up to 460 miles per hour (740 km/h).
- The 1965 Bandy World Championship was won by the Soviet Union. The Soviets had effectively clinched the championship with the defeat of Norway, 4–0, on February 24.

== February 28, 1965 (Sunday) ==
- An 8-year-old boy was killed and eight other people injured when a stock car, driven by NASCAR champion Richard Petty, flew off a drag strip and into a crowd of spectators. The accident, which happened at the Southeastern International Dragway in Dallas, Georgia, happened when a tie rod broke on Petty's Plymouth Barracuda dragster while he was moving at 130 miles per hour (210 km/h). Most of the fans were able to get out of the way, but Wayne Dye of Austell died when the car struck him.
- James T. Aubrey was fired from his job as President of the CBS Television Network. An announcement by CBS, Inc. President Frank Stanton praised Aubrey's "outstanding accomplishments" and said that Aubrey had resigned, but gave no explanation for the dismissal; press reports noted that "it was understood in the industry that the resignation had not been voluntary".
- U.S. aircraft made their first attack on the Mu Gia Pass, the major supply route for the Viet Cong into South Vietnam, as Skyraider planes and Skyhawk jet bombers from the USS Coral Sea made a massive strike.
- As a result of the American announcement, North Vietnam's leaders ordered the evacuation of children and elderly residents from Hanoi and other major cities.
- The United States and South Vietnam announced that sustained bombing of North Vietnam, Operation Rolling Thunder, would begin during the coming week.
- Born:
  - Colum McCann, Irish novelist; in Dublin
  - Park Gok-ji, South Korean film editor
- Died: Adolf Schärf, 74, President of Austria since 1957. Chancellor Josef Klaus became the Acting President. New presidential elections would take place and Franz Jonas would be sworn in on June 9.
