= Han Sang-jin (sociologist) =

South Korean sociologist (born 1945)

Han Sang-Jin
- 한상진
- Born: Imshil, Korea
- Occupations: Sociologist, Professor
- Spouse: Shim Young-Hee

Academic background
- Education: Southern Illinois University
- Thesis: Discursive Method and Social Theory: Selectivity, Discourse and Crisis: A Contribution to a Reflexive Sociology Critical of Domination (1979)
- Doctoral advisor: Charles Lemert

Academic work
- Discipline: Sociologist
- Institutions: Seoul National University
- Website: http://www.joongmin.org/

Han Sang-jin (Korean: 한상진; born February 1945) is a South Korean sociologist in the tradition of critical theory, known for his Joongmin theory. He is professor emeritus at the department of sociology, Seoul National University, Korea, and a distinguished visiting professor at Peking University, China. He has lectured as visiting professor at Columbia University in New York, United States, School for Advanced Studies in the Social Sciences in Paris, France, the University of Buenos Aires in Argentina, and Kyoto University in Japan. His major areas of interest are: social theory, political sociology, human rights and transitional justice, middle class politics, participatory risk governance, Confucianism and East Asian development.

== From childhood to college years ==
Han was born in a small rural village in Imshil, North Jeolla Province, Korea in February, 1945. The village he was born in was famous for the upbringing of intellectuals and was called "doctors' village" because it produced many Ph.D.'s in various fields. The year 1945 was the time when Korea was liberated from the colonial rule of Japan. As one of the so-called "emancipation babies" he later served as the executive chairman of the committee for the 1960s commemoration of Gwangbok (Regaining light and liberation) in 2005 and began to explore the complex meaning of Gwangbok. His life was inevitably intertwined with the turbulent history of Korea.

Han experienced the Korean War (1950–53) in his early childhood and the April student revolution (1960) when he had just entered high school. In 1963, he became a student of sociology at Seoul National University. From 1964 a strong nationalist movement against the Korea-Japan normalization treaty swept over university campuses. While supporting such opposition to the Japanese colonial legacy, he felt the need to explore the constructive goal of development for the future of Korea and thus founded a "Study Group of the Korean Thought" with classmates of social sciences in 1965. Later when he became a graduate student, he led the student movement for academic freedom and autonomy against the dictatorial regime of President Park Chung Hee. Just before the presidential election in 1971 he was arrested and put in jail and prosecuted for the violation of the Anti-communist law after severe investigation. But he was found innocent and acquitted.

Such experiences of hardship helped him realize the harsh reality of national division and ideological conflict and paved a way for him towards an academic life as a critical sociologist with a sense of balance between practice and theory.

== A search for a new critical theory ==
Han's interest in critical theory can be traced back to the late 1960s when he was fascinated by Habermas' "Erkentniss and Interesse" and translated it into Korean. But the core of his own ideas began to be formulated in the late 1970s while he was writing his Ph.D. dissertation at Southern Illinois University, US. In 1996 when he taught at Seoul National University, he invited Habermas to Korea and organized an intensive two-week program of conferences and seminars and public lectures in many cities. Since then he often visits Habermas at his residence in Starnberg, Germany whenever he travels to Europe even now.

Han came to be interested in Foucault through his doctoral advisor Prof. Charles Lemert. When he attempted to link Habermas and Foucault in his dissertation in 1979, the overall academic atmosphere was that the two were so different that linking them was thought to be impossible. Against this, Han proposed an idea of "discursive methodology,' and "discursive social science" and argued that Foucault and Habermas can and should be linked. The basic idea was that discursive social science is composed of discursive analysis and discursive testing, with the former from Foucault and the latter from Habermas. So combining them, he presented discursive social science as an alternative to the outmoded versions of critical theory originating from the Marxist traditions. He spent two years at Bielefeld University, Germany as a postdoctoral researcher and there, collaborated with Claus Offe. After this, he became a professor at the department of sociology at Seoul National University (SNU).

== Formulating Joongmin (中民) Theory in Korean society ==
While teaching at SNU, Han sparked off the debate on bureaucratic-authoritarian (BA) state and it helped clarify the dynamics of the state-led rapid industrialization and its consequences upon class structures and political democratization as well. The mid-1980s was the well acknowledged period of system transition. Deeply influenced by the 1980 Gwangju popular upsurge and June 10 democratization movement of 1987, Han attempted to combine critical theory with empirical studies on the newly emerging middle classes and the working class as well in order to comprehend the major agents of social change.

In this vortex period of social transformation Han proposed the theory of Joongmin originating from intensive public debates. To describe it simply, Joong(中) refers to the middle class and min(民) refers to popular forces. By deliberately combining these two words, each with profound meanings, Han identified the major agent of social change from those who share the identity of grassroots people as members of the middle classes. Han argued that the BA regime in Korea was not only successful in steering continuous economic growth but also produced more and more the modernized social forces, like Joongmin, who would destroy this regime demanding for democratization and social reform. In fact, his theory gained public recognition when a great number of white collars, professionals, and students came out to the street to join the democratic movement in 1987.

As to the method of social transformation, he clearly rejected the models of polarization strongly advocated by radical intellectuals and activists of the day. Instead, he supported what he called a center-expanding strategy by the principle of democracy, which is close to a middle-way progressive transformation. He also offered a three-stage program of transition starting from the external pressure for change by social movement through democratizing state power to socio-economic democracy.

== Human rights and transitional justice in East Asia ==
Han began to expand his research to East Asia in 1991 when he taught at Columbia University in New York as visiting professor. It helped him realize the importance of comparative study between the West and the East, on the one hand, and among the East Asian countries, on the other. Later he became president of the Academy of Korean Studies (1998–2000) and he pursued global dialogues. In particular, he became deeply interested in human rights and transitional justice in East Asia and published many papers on the Gwangju democratization movement of 1980.

While pursuing global dialogue, however, Han kept distance from the West-centered presuppositions in social sciences. Instead, he introduced a reconstructed Confucian framework of understanding. For instance, he argued for a balance between individual empowerment and community wellbeing and also between retributive justice and reconciliation. A good case in point is his study of the Gwangju democratic movement with the focus on the experience of self-rule by citizens as an instance of communitarian human rights.

Transitional justice in East Asia is full of ambiguities and contradictions today. Many have asked Japan to follow the German pathway. Japan has refused, however. In this situation, Han offered a communicative approach by paying sympathetic attention to the war memories of the Japanese citizens. The ordinary people of Japan were kept from the information of the crimes committed by their imperial army abroad while heavily exposed to the pains and sacrifices of war, especially the catastrophic outcomes of atom bombs dropped on Hiroshima and Nagasaki. Thus they developed the identity of the victim rather than that of a perpetrator or aggressor. This is the last position most Korean and Chinese citizens would take. In this context, the communication approach suggested by Han is an attempt to get out of the trap of antagonism led by politicians in terms of national interests and open up a cosmopolitan horizon of mutual understanding at the level of civil society. All factors considered, Han thinks that the current dilemma may find a threshold to solution when the USA became a partner in transitional justice, reflecting on the war crimes and sacrifices for which she is also responsible as Japan is.

== Risk society and East Asia ==
Han first wrote about risk society in 1995 when many disasters broke out simultaneously in Korea as unintended consequences of compressed modernity, Han has since attempted to deepen critical theory into the analysis of complex risks that East Asia faces and conducted empirical survey researches to assess the extent of the public perception of risks and social responses to them. The best example is the 2012 citizen survey in Seoul, Beijing, and Tokyo that he conducted with Li Qiang of Tsinghua University, China.

Han closely cooperated with Ulrich Beck in many respects. He often joined the "Cosmo-climate" ERC workshops Beck organized in Europe and invited Beck to Korea twice in 2008 and 2014 for public lectures, conferences and seminars. Beck offered valuable insights and concepts for the future of East Asia. After his sudden death on 1 January 2015, Han organized a memorial symposium and ceremony in Seoul in March and Mayor of Seoul Metropolitan Government, Park Won-soon, delivered a touching tribute address.

In addition, Han has collaborated actively with many Chinese sociologists, particularly with the research groups of Tsinghua University to lay the foundation for a theory of second-modern transformation in East Asia. He has offered the views that the idea of risk society fits better to East Asia than Europe today, that individualization should be understood in close connection to the changing patterns of community networks, and that the Chinese Confucian concepts of Tianxia and Tianxiaweigong can be reconstructed as a solid basis for Beck's concept of cosmopolitan risk community and governance.

== Han's life as public intellectual ==
Han has been active as a public intellectual. He has been known as a famous columnist since the 1980s and wrote many columns in major daily newspapers. Particularly, in the period of democratic transition and consolidation during the 1980s and 1990s, he wielded considerable influence on public opinion.

Han began to openly help the opposition party of Korea, the Democratic Party from 1988. Later he served as the chair of Presidential Commission on Policy Planning during the Kim Dae-jung government from 2001 to 2002 and played an important role in assisting President Kim for policy-making. He also served as the president of the Academy of Korean Studies from 1998 to 2000 and acted as the civil negotiation representative of Korea for the return of the Oegyujanggak Royal books taken by the French navy in 1866. In 2005 he also served as the executive chairman of the committee for the 60's commemoration of Gwangbok.

Recently, right after the defeat of the Democratic Party in the presidential election in December 2012, Han was invited and served as the chairman of the Committee for the Evaluation of the Presidential Election of the party and sorted out main causes of defeat from the perspective of citizens rather than of the party leadership. The final report opened up tense debate with public attention. In 2016 Han served as the chairman of the Preparation Committee of the third party, namely People's Party which was successful in gaining up to 38 seats out of the total 300 seats in the general election in April, 2016.

Though he has served in various public positions, Han has tried to balance himself between political engagement and critical sociology. His intention is to keep himself as a public intellectual and keep engaging himself politically within this identity, when the historical situation calls for it.

== Recent activities ==
After his retirement from Seoul National University in 2010, Han established the Joongmin Foundation for Social Theory (JMF) in order to go back to the point where he started his intellectual life. He also established the Europe-Asia Research Network (EARN) in 2014 together with Beck. Based on these, Han has been supporting and initiating various kinds of research and activities to promote cosmopolitan dialogues and cooperation.

== Publications ==
- 2026 —Critical Theory: The Debate with Habermas in Seoul. Joongmin Publishers. ISBN 979-11-94667-05-6
- 2025 —Discovery and Growth of Joongmin: From the 1980s to Global Metamorphosis in the 21th Century. Joongmin Publishers (in Korean). ISBN 979-11-94667-05-6
- 2022 —Dialogue with Habermas. Joongmin Publishers (in Korean) ISBN 979-11-966142-6-3
- 2019 — Confucianism and Reflexive Modernity, Leiden & Boston: Brill. ISBN 9789004352551
- 2018 — Asian Tradition and Cosmopolitan Politics, edited by Han Sang-Jin, Rowman & Littlefield: Lexington Books.
- 2017 — Beyond Risk Society: Ulrich Beck and the Korean Debate, edited by Han Sang-Jin, Seoul National University Press.
- 2015 — Joongmin Theory and Korean Society [e-book], Joongmin Publishers (in Korean). ISBN 9791195588800
- 2015 — Politics is Conviviality, collaborated with Choe, Jong-Suk, Medici Media (in Korean). ISBN 9791157060238
- 2012 — Divided Nations and Transitional Justice: What Germany, Japan and South Korea can Teach the World. Former President of South Korea Kim Dae Jung and former President of Germany Richard von Weizsäcker, edited by Han Sang-Jin, Boulder: Paradigm Publisher. ISBN 9781594519017
- 2010 — World at Risk and the Future of Family, co-edited with Shim, Young-Hee, Saemulgyul (in Korean). ISBN 9788955592832
- 2007 — The Global Forum on Civilization and Peace, co-edited with Yun, Duck-Hong, Academy of Korean Studies. ISBN 9788971056134
- 2007 — Human Rights in North Korea, co-edited with Park, Kie-Duck, Seoul: Sejong Institute. ISBN 9788974295103
- 2006 — Dynamic Balance and the Future of Korea 1: Democratic Politics and Balanced International Relations, co-edited with Lim, Dongwon et al. * Seoul: Nanam (in Korean). ISBN 9788930081627
- 2006 — Dynamic Balance and the Future of Korea 3: Social Integration and Balanced Growth, co-edited with Song, Ki-do, et al. Seoul: Nanam (in Korean). ISBN 9788930081641
- 2003 — 386 Generation: Its Brightness and Dark Side, Seoul: Munhaksasang (in Korean). ISBN 8970124950
- 2003 — The Key to the Trust between Management and Labor, edited by Han Sang-Jin, Seoul: Nanam (in Korean). ISBN 9788930039666
- 2000 — Facticity and Validity (Jürgen Habermas, Faktizität und Geltung), co-translated with Park, Young-Do, Seoul: Nanam (in Korean). ISBN 9788930082266
- 1998 — Habermas and the Korean Debate, Seoul National University Press ISBN 9788970963235
- 1998 — Modern Society and Human Rights, edited by Han Sang-Jin, Seoul: Nanam (in Korean). ISBN 9788930036467
- 1998 — Towards the World with Asian Perspective: Kim, Dae-Jung's Lecture in Seoul National University on Human Rights and Discussion, edited by Han Sang-Jin, Seoul: Nanam (in Korean). ISBN 9788930036535
- 1998 — The Third Way (A translation of The Third Way by Anthony Giddens), co-translated with Park, Chan Wook, Seoul, Saenggakoe Namu (in Korean). ISBN 9788988045336
- 1997 — Habermas: Planning for Rational Society: its Logic and Ethic, Seoul: Nanam (in Korean). ISBN 9788930035613
- 1996 — The New Horizon of Modernity: Habermas' Lectures in Korea, edited by Han Sang-Jin, Seoul: Nanam (in Korean). ISBN 9788930035019
- 1995 — Nunca Mas, Never Again, Seoul: Chaeksesang (in Korean). ISBN 9788970130590
- 1992 — Korea: In Search of a Third Way, Seoul: Chaeksesang (in Korean). ISBN 9788970130019
- 1992 — Social Movement and Social Reform, Seoul: Jeonyewon (in Korean).
- 1991 — Searching for A Theory of 'Joongmin' (Middling Grassroots), Seoul: Munjisa (in Korean).
- 1991 — Marxism and Democracy, edited by Han Sang-Jin, Seoul: Samunyeon (in Korean).
- 1990 — Claus Offe on State and Crises, edited by Han Sang-Jin, translated by Seo, Gyu-Hwan & Park, Young-Do, Seoul: Jeonyewon (in Korean).
- 1990 — Studies on Michel Foucault, edited by Han Sang-Jin, Seoul: Hanwool-sa (in Korean).
- 1990 — Sociology of Systems Comparison (A translation of Western Capitalism and State Socialism by H. Davis & R. Scase, Oxford: Basil Blackwell), Seoul, Nuetinamu-sa (in Korean).
- 1990 — Lessons from Europe and the Third World (Dieter Senghaas, von Europa Lernen, Suhrkamp, 1982), co-translated with Yu-Palmu, Seoul: Nanam (in Korean).
- 1988 — Bureaucratic Authoritarianism in Korean Society, Seoul: Munjisa (in Korean).
- 1988 — Who Are the Carriers of Social Transformation? Seoul: Dong-A Ilbo-sa (in Korean).
- 1987 — Social Scientific Approaches to 'Minjung'(Grassroots) co-edited with Yang, Jong Hoe, Seoul: Munjisa (in Korean).
- 1984 — The Theories of Social Classes and Stratification, edited by Han Sang-Jin, Seoul: Munjisa (in Korean).
- 1984 — Social Theories and Ideology (A translation of The Concept of Ideology by J. Larrain, London: Hutchinson, 1979), co-translated with Shim, Young-Hee, Seoul: Hanwool-sa (in Korean).
- 1984 — Bureaucratic Authoritarianism and corporation (Gillermo O'Donnell, Bureaucratic Authoritarianism and corporation), Seoul: Hanwool-sa (in Korean).
- 1984 — Bureaucratic Authoritarianism in the Third World, edited by Han Sang-Jin, Seoul: Hanwool-sa (in Korean).
- 1983 — Korean Society, Where is it Going?, Hyundai Sahoe Yeonguso (in Korean).
- 1983 — Critical Sociology (A. Giddens, "Sociology: A Brief but Critical Introduction," London: Macmillan, 1982), Seoul: Hyunsanggwa Inshik (in Korean).
