= Diocese of Dungu–Doruma =

Roman Catholic diocese in the Democratic Republic of the Congo

Coordinates: 3.6023°N 28.5671°E

Diocese of Dungu–Doruma Dioecesis Dunguensis-Dorumaensis

Location
- Country: Democratic Republic of the Congo
- Metropolitan: Kisangani

Statistics
- Area: 44,000 km^{2} (17,000 sq mi)
- Population: Total; Catholics: (as of 2004); 200,000; 105,000 (52.5%)

Information
- Rite: Latin Rite

Current leadership
- Pope: Leo XIV
- Bishop: Emile Mushosho Matabaro

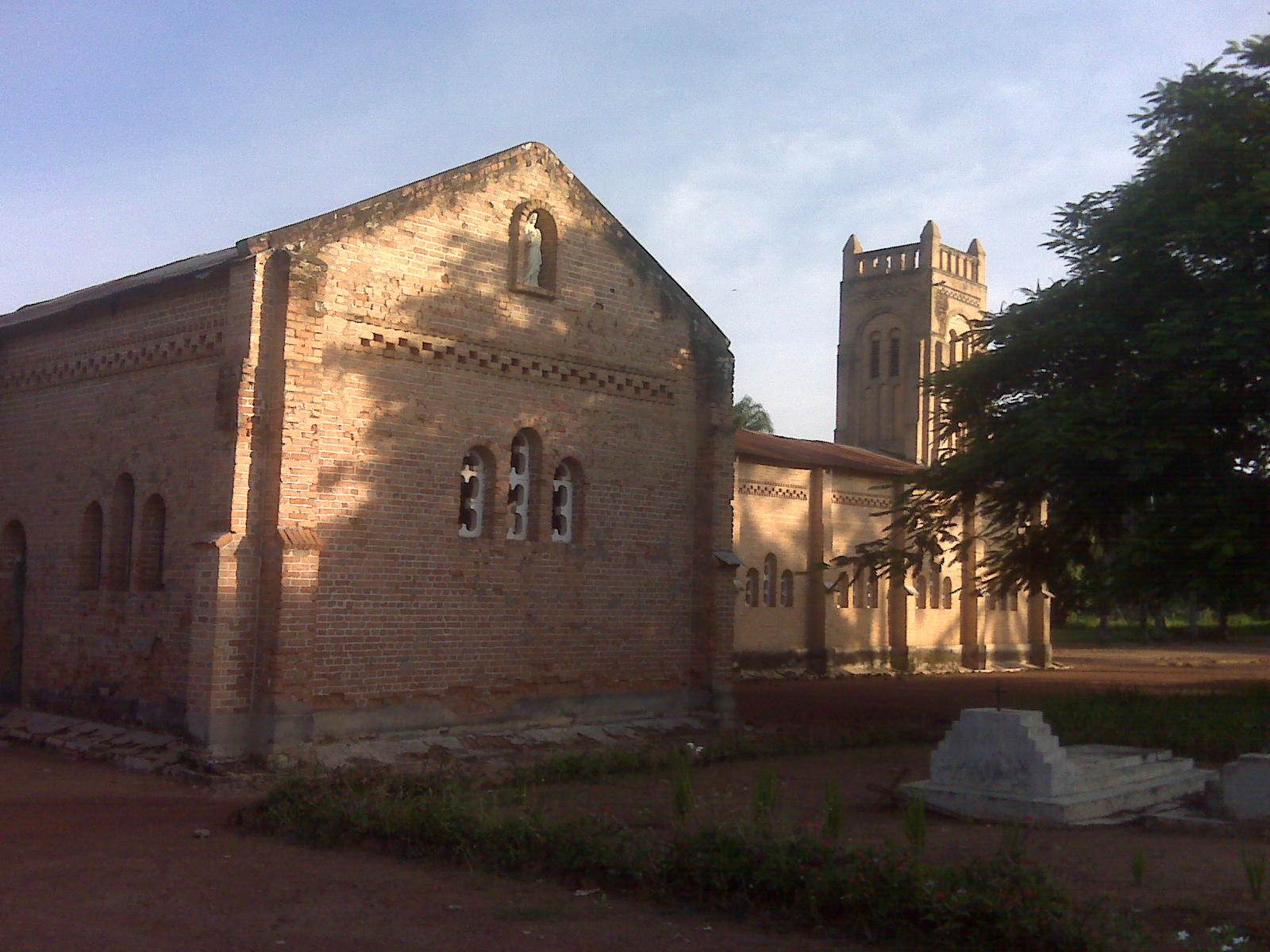

The Roman Catholic Diocese of Dungu–Doruma (Latin: Dunguen(sis) – Dorumaën(sis)) is a diocese located in the city of Dungu in the ecclesiastical province of Kisangani in the Democratic Republic of the Congo.

== History ==
- 24 February 1958: Established as Apostolic Prefecture of Doruma from the Apostolic Vicariate of Niangara
- 26 September 1967: Promoted as Diocese of Doruma
- 3 July 1970: Renamed as Diocese of Doruma – Dungu
- 8 November 2023: Renamed as Diocese of Dungu – Doruma

== Bishops ==
=== Ordinaries, in reverse chronological order ===
- Bishops of Doruma–Dungu (Latin Rite), below
  - Bishop Emile Mushosho Matabaro (24 October 2022 – present)
  - Bishop Richard Domba Mady (14 March 1994 – 3 July 2021)
  - Bishop Emile Aiti Waro Leru’a (7 May 1983 – 25 September 1989)
  - Bishop Guillaume van den Elzen, O.S.A. (3 July 1970 – 7 May 1983); see below
- Bishop of Doruma (Latin Rite), below
  - Bishop Guillaume van den Elzen, O.S.A. (26 September 1967 – 3 July 1970); see above & below
- Prefect Apostolic of Doruma (Latin Rite), below
  - Father Guillaume van den Elzen, O.S.A. (13 November 1958 – 26 September 1967); see above

=== Coadjutor bishop ===
- Emile Aiti Waro Leru’a (1978–1983)

== See also ==
- Roman Catholicism in the Democratic Republic of the Congo
