= Sosthène Ayikuli Udjuwa =

Congolese Catholic prelate (born 1963)

The Most Reverend Sosthène Ayikuli Udjuwa
- Bishop of Mahagi-Nioka, Democratic Republic of the Congo
- Church: Catholic Church
- Archdiocese: Roman Catholic Archdiocese of Kisangani
- See: Roman Catholic Diocese of Mahagi-Nioka
- Appointed: 16 November 2010
- Installed: 12 January 2011
- Predecessor: Marcel Utembi Tapa
- Successor: Incumbent

Orders
- Ordination: 15 July 1993
- Consecration: 12 January 2011 by Marcel Utembi Tapa
- Rank: Bishop

Personal details
- Born: Sosthène Ayikuli Udjuwa; 7 July 1963 (age 63) Faradje, Diocese of Niangara, Haut-Uele, DR Congo
- Motto: "Formetur Christus in vobis" (May Christ be formed in you)

Styles of Sosthène Ayikuli Udjuwa
- Reference style: Your Lordship; The Most Reverend
- Spoken style: His Lordship
- Religious style: Bishop

Sosthène Ayikuli Udjuwa (born 7 July 1963) is a Congolese Catholic prelate who is the Bishop of the Roman Catholic Diocese of Mahagi-Nioka in the Democratic Republic of the Congo since 16 November 2010. Before that, from 15 July 1993 until he was appointed bishop, he was a priest of the Roman Catholic Diocese of Mahagi-Nioka in the DR Congo. He was appointed bishop on 16 November 2010 by Pope Benedict XVI. He was consecrated as bishop at Mahagi on 12 January 2011 by Archbishop Marcel Utembi Tapa, Archbishop of Kisangani.

== Background and education ==
He was born on 7 July 1963 at Faradje, Diocese of Isiro-Niangara, Haut-Uele, DR Congo. He studied in his home area for his elementary school education. He studied at Tadu for his secondary school education. He continued with his secondary school studies at the Rungu Minor Seminary from 1978 until 1984. He studied philosophy in Kisangani from 1985 until 1988. He then studied theology in Bunia from 1988 until 1993. He holds a Master's degree in Canon Law awarded by the Catholic University of the Congo in Kinshasa. He also graduated with a Doctorate in Canon Law from the Pontifical Lateran University in Rome, Italy in 2009 having studied there since 2002.

== Priest ==
On 15 July 1993 he was ordained a priest of the Roman Catholic Diocese of Mahagi-Nioka, in the Democratic Republic of the Congo. He served as a priest until 16 November 2010.

While a priest, he served in various roles including as:

- Professor at the Jean XXIII Minor Seminary in Vida, Mahagi-Nioka Diocese from 1993 until 1997.
- Professor at the Theologate of Saint Cyprien in Bunia from 1999 until 2001.
- Assistant priest in Ariwara from 2001 until 2002.
- Assistant priest in the Diocese of Palestrina in 2009.
- Diocesan Administrator of Mahagi- Nioka Diocese from 2009 until 2010.

== Bishop ==
Pope Benedict XVI appointed him Bishop of Mahagi-Nioka on 16 November 2010.He was consecrated and installed at Mahagi on 12 January 2011 by the hands of Archbishop Marcel Utembi Tapa, Archbishop of Kisangani assisted by Bishop Richard Domba Mady, Bishop of Doruma-Dungu and Bishop Julien Andavo Bule Ahuba Mbia, Bishop of Isiro-Niangara.

On 3 August 2024 Bishop Sosthène Ayikuli Udjuwa, the Local Ordinary of Mahagi-Nioka, DR Congo, was appointed the Apostolic Administrator of the Roman Catholic Diocese of Wamba. That administratorship ended on 15 September 2024.

== See also ==
- Catholic Church in the Democratic Republic of the Congo

== Succession table ==
Catholic Church titles
Preceded by Marcel Utembi Tapa (16 October 2001 - 28 November 2008)	Bishop of Mahagi-Nioka (since 16 November 2010)	Succeeded by Incumbent
