= Richard Domba Mady =

Congolese Roman Catholic prelate (1953–2021)

- Bishop of Doruma–Dungu
- Church: Catholic Church
- Diocese: Diocese of Doruma–Dungu
- In office: 14 March 1994 – 3 July 2021
- Predecessor: Emile Aiti Waro Leru’a
- Successor: Emile Mushosho Matabaro

Orders
- Ordination: 14 September 1980
- Consecration: 31 July 1994 by Laurent Monsengwo Pasinya

Personal details
- Born: 10 January 1953 Aba, Orientale Province, Belgian Congo, Belgian Empire
- Died: 3 July 2021 (aged 68) Kinshasa, Democratic Republic of the Congo

Richard Domba Mady (10 January 1953 – 3 July 2021) was a Congolese Roman Catholic prelate. He served as the third Bishop of the Roman Catholic Diocese of Doruma–Dungu, located in northeast Democratic Republic of the Congo, from his installation on 31 July 1994 until his death on 3 July 2021. During his tenure, his diocese endured a series of attacks during the numerous conflicts affecting the eastern Democratic Republic of Congo, including the First Congo War, the Second Congo War, and the aftermath of these wars.

Richard Domba Mady died at the HJ Hospital in Kinshasa on 3 July 2021, at the age of 68. His death was announced by Marcel Utembi Tapa, the Archbishop of the Roman Catholic Archdiocese of Kisangani and President of the Episcopal Conference of the Democratic Republic of the Congo (Cenco).
