= Diocese of Mahagi–Nioka =

Roman Catholic diocese in the Democratic Republic of the Congo

Diocese of Mahagi–Nioka Dioecesis Mahagiensis-Niokaensis Diocèse catholique romain de Mahagi-Nioka

Location
- Country: Democratic Republic of the Congo
- Metropolitan: Kisangani

Statistics
- Area: 18,490 km^{2} (7,140 sq mi)
- Population: Total; Catholics: (as of 2004); 1,563,633; 858,789 (54.9%)

Information
- Rite: Latin Rite

Current leadership
- Pope: Leo XIV
- Bishop: Sosthène Ayikuli Udjuwa

The Roman Catholic Diocese of Mahagi–Nioka (Latin: Romano-Catholicae Dioecesis Mahagi-Nioka, French: Diocèse catholique romain de Mahagi-Nioka) is a diocese located in the territories of Mahagi–Nioka, Ituri Province, in the ecclesiastical province of Kisangani in the Democratic Republic of the Congo.

== History ==
- 2 July 1962: Established as Diocese of Mahagi from the Diocese of Bunia
- 30 October 1967: Renamed as Diocese of Mahagi – Nioka

== Bishops ==
=== Ordinaries, in reverse chronological order ===
- Bishops of Mahagi–Nioka (Latin Rite), below
  - Bishop Sosthène Ayikuli Udjuwa (16 November 2010 – present)
  - Bishop Marcel Utembi Tapa (16 October 2001 – 28 November 2008), appointed Archbishop of Kisangani
  - Bishop Alphonse-Marie Runiga Musanganya (4 September 1980 – 16 October 2001)
  - Bishop Thomas Kuba Thowa (30 October 1967 – 10 October 1979); see below
- Bishop of Mahagi (Latin Rite), below
  - Bishop Thomas Kuba Thowa (2 July 1962 – 30 October 1967); see above

=== Other priest of this diocese who became bishop ===
- Etienne Ung'eyowun Bediwegi, appointed Bishop of Bondo in 2008

== See also ==
- Roman Catholicism in the Democratic Republic of the Congo

== Sources ==
- GCatholic.org
- Catholic Hierarchy
