= 1965 Belgian general election =

- 23 May 1965

212 seats in the Chamber of Representatives
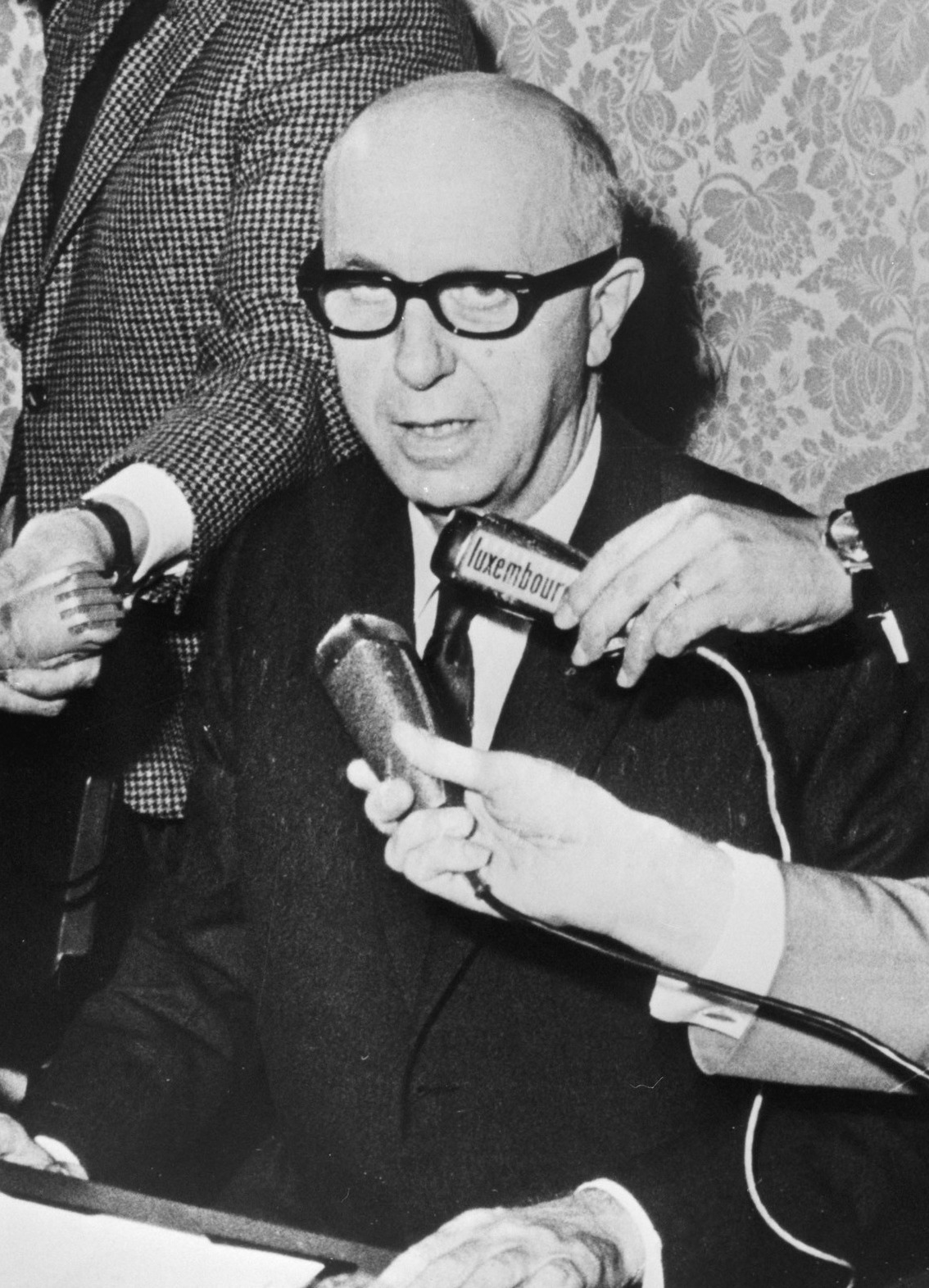

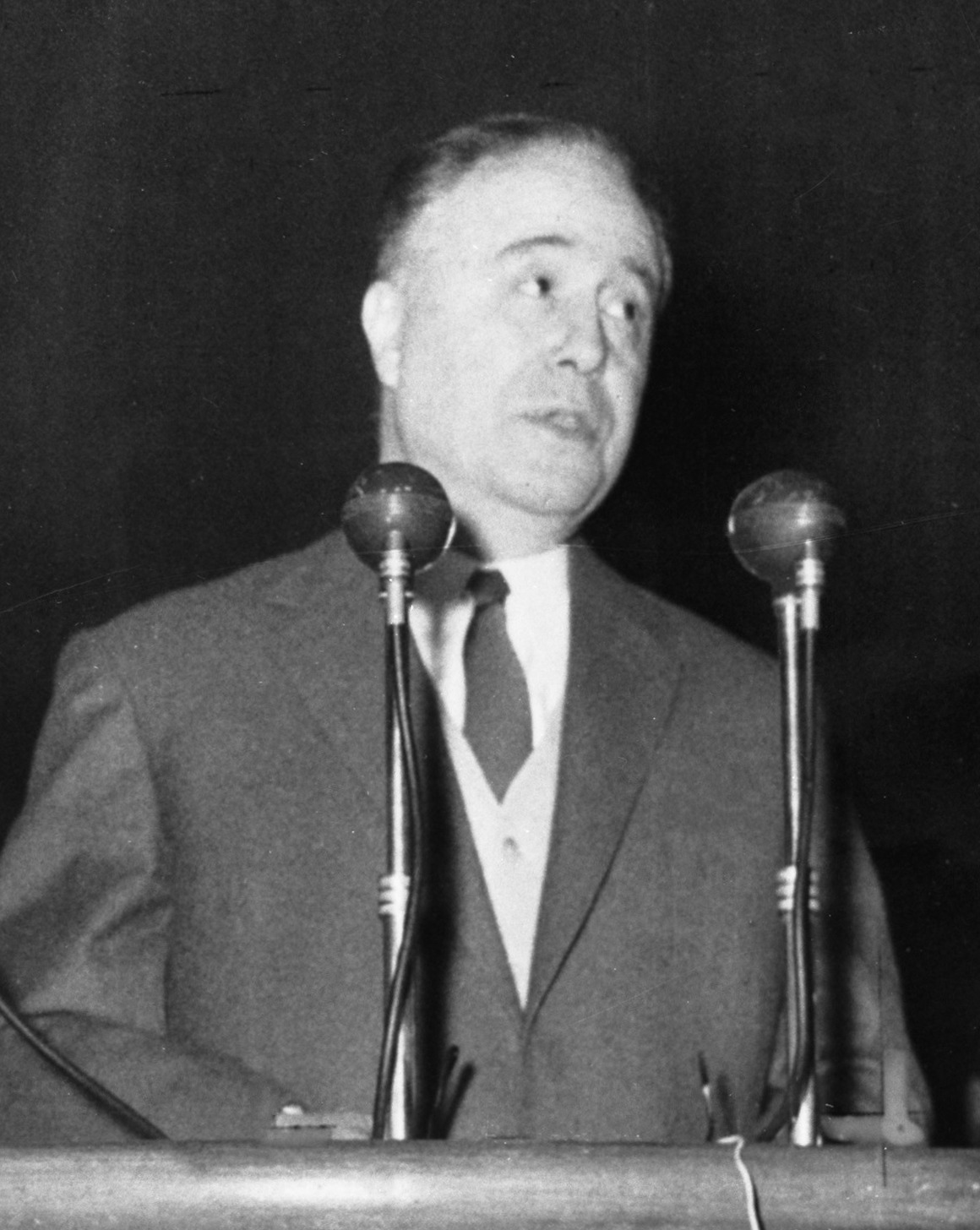

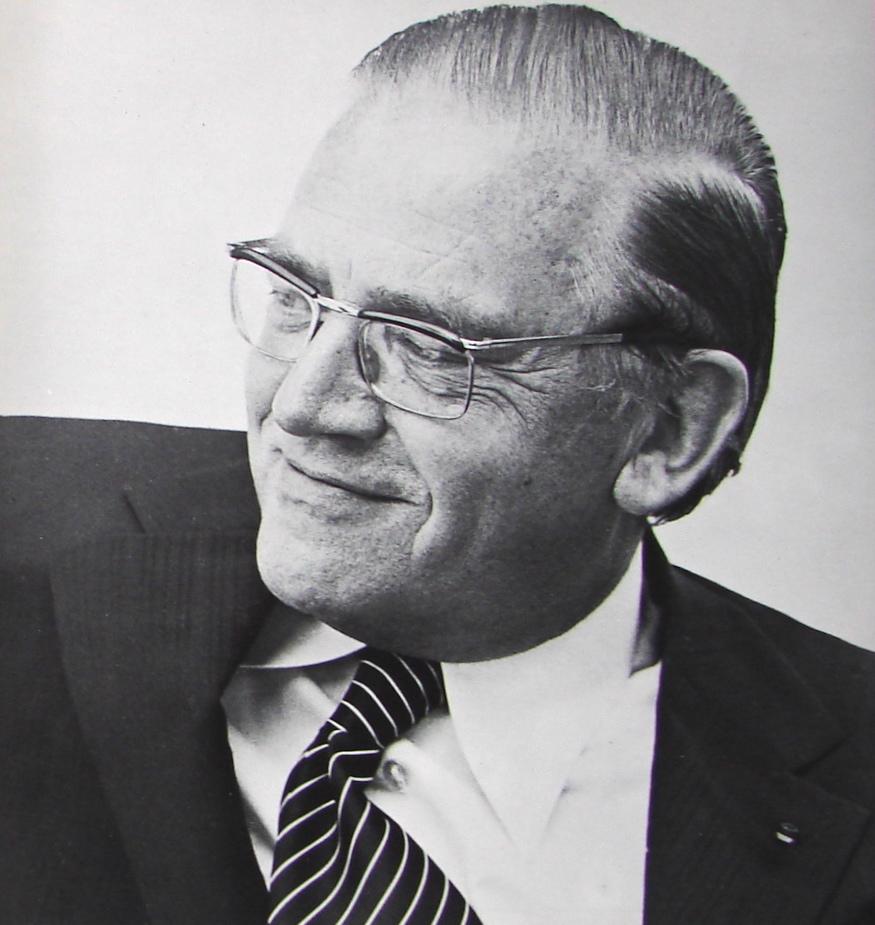

	First party	Second party	Third party
Leader	Pierre Harmel	Léo Collard	Omer Vanaudenhove
Party	Christian Social	Socialist	Freedom and Progress
Leader since	Candidate for PM	1959	1961
Last election	96 seats, 41.46%	84 seats, 36.72%	New
Seats won	77	64	48
Seat change	▼19	▼20	New
Popular vote	1,785,211	1,403,107	1,119,991
Percentage	34.45%	28.28%	21.61%
Swing	▼7.01%	▼8.44%	New
	Fourth party	Fifth party	Sixth party
Leader	Frans Van der Elst	Ernest Burnelle	Paul Brien
Party	VU	Communist	DéFI
Leader since	1955	1954	1964
Last election	5 seats, 3.46%	5 seats, 3.08%	New
Seats won	12	6	3
Seat change	▲7	▲1	New
Popular vote	346,860	247,311	68,966
Percentage	6.69%	4.77%	1.33%
Swing	▲3.23%	▲1.69%	New
- Chamber seat distribution by constituency
Government before election
Lefèvre
CVP/PSC-BSP/PSB
Government after election
Harmel
CVP/PSC-BSP/PSB

General elections were held in Belgium on 23 May 1965. The result was a victory for the Christian Social Party, which won 77 of the 212 seats in the Chamber of Representatives and 44 of the 106 seats in the Senate. Voter turnout was 91.6%. Elections for the nine provincial councils were also held.

The elections followed the implementation of the 1962 language laws. As a result, the Flemish nationalist People's Union made big gains, as well as the new Democratic Front of the Francophones which was founded as a response to the language laws.

The election also followed the founding of the Party for Freedom and Progress, succeeding the Liberal Party. The new party aimed to reach a broader voter base, in which it succeeded by more than doubling its number of seats.

Despite both government parties losing seats, they retained their sizeable majority and continued governing.

== Results ==
=== Chamber of Representatives ===
Party	Votes	%	Seats	+/–
Christian Social Party	1,785,211	34.43	77	–19
Belgian Socialist Party	1,465,503	28.27	64	–20
Party for Freedom and Progress	1,119,991	21.60	48	+28
People's Union	346,860	6.69	12	+7
Communist Party of Belgium	236,721	4.57	6	+1
Democratic Front of the Francophones	68,966	1.33	3	New
Walloon Front	24,245	0.47	1	New
Walloon Workers' Party	23,582	0.45	1	New
de Socialist	14,937	0.29	0	New
Catholic Party	14,007	0.27	0	New
Flemish People's Party	13,451	0.26	0	New
Walloon Communist Party	13,321	0.26	0	New
Independent Social Party	9,493	0.18	0	New
Independent Workers Union	8,680	0.17	0	New
Flemish Democrats	7,983	0.15	0	New
Walloon Democratic Front	5,709	0.11	0	New
Afzonderlijk	4,762	0.09	0	New
Francophone Union	3,776	0.07	0	New
Independent National Party	3,089	0.06	0	New
Animal Protection	2,543	0.05	0	New
Belgian Workers' Party	2,237	0.04	0	New
Independent Rally	2,213	0.04	0	New
National Party	1,889	0.04	0	0
Return to Liège	1,552	0.03	0	New
Union of Independents	1,014	0.02	0	New
Independent Middle Class	958	0.02	0	New
Kaganovemus	890	0.02	0	New
Trotsky Communists	385	0.01	0	New
New Resistance Movement	309	0.01	0	New
Independents	493	0.01	0	–1
Total	5,184,770	100.00	212	0
Valid votes	5,184,770	92.89		
Invalid/blank votes	396,941	7.11		
Total votes	5,581,711	100.00		
Registered voters/turnout	6,091,534	91.63		
Source: Belgian Elections

=== Senate ===
Party	Votes	%	Seats	+/–
Christian Social Party	1,785,191	34.89	44	–3
Belgian Socialist Party	1,449,482	28.33	31	–14
Party for Freedom and Progress	1,111,894	21.73	23	+12
People's Union	338,770	6.62	4	+2
Communist Party of Belgium	249,796	4.88	3	+2
Democratic Front of the Francophones	68,397	1.34	1	New
Walloon Democratic Front	27,215	0.53	0	New
Walloon Workers' Party	21,511	0.42	0	New
Independent Social Party	12,180	0.24	0	New
Walloon Communist Party	11,600	0.23	0	New
Francophone Union	7,656	0.15	0	New
Independent Rally	7,456	0.15	0	New
Independent Workers Union	6,448	0.13	0	New
Catholic Party	5,226	0.10	0	New
Belgian Workers' Party	4,207	0.08	0	New
Independent National Party	4,066	0.08	0	New
National Party	2,885	0.06	0	0
Kaganovemus	1,739	0.03	0	New
Independent Middle Class	831	0.02	0	New
Flemish Democrats	475	0.01	0	New
Total	5,117,025	100.00	106	0
Valid votes	5,117,025	91.73		
Invalid/blank votes	461,584	8.27		
Total votes	5,578,609	100.00		
Registered voters/turnout	6,091,534	91.58		
Source: Belgian Elections

== Constituencies ==
The distribution of seats among the electoral districts was as follows for the Chamber of Representatives. Seats were reapportioned among the districts due to population growth, which was stronger in Flanders than in Wallonia, and due to several municipalities having been changed to another province following the 1962 language laws. For example, the Comines-Warneton municipalities were transferred from Ypres (West Flanders) to the newly created arrondissement of Mouscron (Hainaut), causing Ypres to lose one seat and Tournai-Ath-Mouscron to gain one seat.

Province	Arrondissement(s)	Chamber	Change
Antwerp	Antwerp	20	–
Antwerp	Mechelen	6	–
Antwerp	Turnhout	7	+1
Limburg	Hasselt	6	+1
Limburg	Tongeren-Maaseik	7	+1
East Flanders	Aalst	6	–
East Flanders	Oudenaarde	3	–
East Flanders	Gent-Eeklo	13	–
East Flanders	Dendermonde	4	–
East Flanders	Sint-Niklaas	4	–
West Flanders	Bruges	5	–
West Flanders	Roeselare-Tielt	5	–
West Flanders	Kortrijk	6	–
West Flanders	Ypres	2	–1
West Flanders	Veurne-Diksmuide-Ostend	5	–
Brabant	Leuven	8	+1
Brabant	Brussels	33	+1
Brabant	Nivelles	5	–
Hainaut	Tournai-Ath-Mouscron	7	+1
Hainaut	Charleroi	11	–
Hainaut	Thuin	3	–1
Hainaut	Mons	6	–1
Hainaut	Soignies	4	–
Liège	Huy-Waremme	4	–
Liège	Liège	14	–
Liège	Verviers	5	–1
Luxembourg	Arlon-Marche-Bastogne	3	–
Luxembourg	Neufchâteau-Virton	2	–1
Namur	Namur	5	–
Namur	Dinant-Philippeville	3	–1
Total		212	–
