= Emile Mushosho Matabaro =

Congolese Catholic prelate (born 1967)

The Most Reverend Emile Mushosho Matabaro
- Bishop of Doruma-Dungu, Democratic Republic of the Congo
- Church: Catholic Church
- Archdiocese: Roman Catholic Archdiocese of Kisangani
- See: Roman Catholic Diocese of Doruma-Dungu
- Appointed: 24 October 2022
- Installed: 8 December 2022
- Predecessor: Richard Domba Mady
- Successor: Incumbent
- Other post(s): Apostolic Administrator of Doruma-Dungu (12 July 2021 - 24 October 2022)

Orders
- Ordination: 17 September 2000
- Consecration: 8 December 2022 by Marcel Utembi Tapa
- Rank: Bishop

Personal details
- Born: Emile Mushosho Matabaro; 5 March 1967 (age 58); Bukavu, Archdiocese of Bukavu, South Kivu, DR Congo

Styles of Emile Mushosho Matabaro
- Reference style: Your Lordship; The Most Reverend
- Spoken style: His Lordship
- Religious style: Bishop

Emile Mushosho Matabaro (born 5 March 1967) is a Congolese Catholic prelate who is the bishop of the Roman Catholic Diocese of Doruma-Dungu, Democratic Republic of the Congo since 24 October 2022. Before that, from 17 September 2000 until he was appointed bishop, he was a priest of the Catholic Archdiocese of Bukavu. He was appointed bishop by Pope Francis on 24 October 2022. He was consecrated and installed at Dungu on 8 December 2022 by Archbishop Marcel Utembi Tapa, Archbishop of Kisangani. While still a priest, he served as the Apostolic Administrator of the Diocese of Doruma-Dungu from 12 July 2021 until 24 October 2022.

== Background and education ==
He was born on 5 March 1967 in Bukavu in the Archdiocese of Bukavu, South Kivu, DR Congo. He studied philosophy and theology at seminary. He studied from 2007 until 2012 at the San Damaso Ecclesiastical University in Madrid, Spain where he graduated with a Licentiate in theology. The same university awarded him a Doctorate in theology following his studies there from 2013 until 2017.

== Priest ==
He was appointed a priest of the Roman Catholic Archdiocese of Bukavu on 17 September 2000 at the Cathedral of Notre-Dame de la Paix in Bukavu, 17 September 2000.

As a priest, he served in various roles including as:

- Parish Vicar of Ciherano Parish from 2000 until 2003.
- Parish priest of Ciherano Parish from 2000 until 2003.
- Parish Priest of Saint Pierre Parish in Cibimbi from 2003 until 2007.
- Parish priest of Bagira Parish in 2011.
- Director of the Diocesan Office for Social Works and Development from 2011 until 2012.
- President of the Union of Diocesan Clergy from 2011until 2013.
- Bursar and moderator of the Diocesan Commission for Assets from 2017 until 2018.
- Episcopal Vicar in-charge of economic affairs and chancellor from 2018 until 2019.
- Vicar General of the Archdiocese of Bukavu from 2019 until 2021.
- Apostolic Administrator of the diocese Doruma-Dungu, DRC from 12 July 2021 until 24 October 2022.

== As bishop ==
On 24 October 2022, Pope Francis appointed him Bishop of Doruma-Dungu, in the Democratic Republic of the Congo. He was consecrated and installed at Dungu on 8 December 2022 by the hands of Archbishop Marcel Utembi Tapa, Archbishop of Kisangani assisted by Archbishop François-Xavier Maroy Rusengo, Archbishop of Bukavu and Bishop Julien Andavo Mbia, Bishop of Isiro-Niangara.

== See also ==
- Catholic Church in the Democratic Republic of the Congo

== Succession table ==
Catholic Church titles
Preceded by Richard Domba Mady (14 March 1994 - 3 July 2021)	Bishop of Doruma-Dungu (since 24 October 2022)	Succeeded by Incumbent
