= Walloon Front =

The Walloon Front for the Unity and Freedom of Wallonia (French: Front Wallon pour l'Unité et la Liberté de la Wallonie, FW) was a political party in Belgium.

== History ==
The FW was established by former Belgian Socialist Party member Robert Moreau on 19 January 1964. In the 1965 general elections the party received 0.5% of the vote and won a single seat in the Chamber of Representatives. On 26 June 1965 it merged with the Walloon Workers' Party, the Walloon Democratic Rally and the Wallon Democratic Front to form the Walloon Party, the forerunner to the Walloon Rally.

In 2013 a new Walloon Front party was established to participate in the 2014 elections.
