= Walloon Workers' Party =

The Walloon Workers' Party (French: Parti Wallon des Travailleurs, PWT) was a political party in Belgium.

== History ==
The PWT was established by François Perin on 26 February 1965. In the May 1965 general elections the party received 0.5% of the vote and won a single seat in the Chamber of Representatives. On 25 June 1965 it merged with the Walloon Front, the Walloon Democratic Rally and the Wallon Democratic Front to form the Walloon Party, the forerunner to the Walloon Rally.
