= Charles Lemert =

American sociologist

Charles Lemert (born 1937) is an American born social theorist and sociologist. He has written extensively on social theory, globalization and culture. He has contributed to many key debates in social thought, authoring dozens of books including his text Social Things: An Introduction to the Sociological Life, 5th edition (Rowman & Littlefield, 2011). From 1982 to 2010, he taught at Wesleyan University in Middletown, Connecticut.

Lemert is distinguished as a theorist in the US, most notably for introducing French theory to American sociology. His first book Sociology and the Twilight of Man: Homocentrism and Discourse in Sociological Theory (Southern Illinois University Press, 1979) drew from theoretical contributions of the likes of Michel Foucault and Jacques Derrida in order to critique humanism in sociological theory. Lemert is also known for his instructional texts: Social Theory: The Multicultural and Classic Readings (Westview Press, 2004) and Thinking the Unthinkable: The Riddles of Classical Social Theories (Paradigm Publishers, 2007).

He wrote a column called "Slow Thoughts for Fast Times" for the online journal Fast Capitalism and edits the Great Barrington Books series for Paradigm Publishers and New Social Formations series for Rowman & Littlefield.

== Career ==
Education

Lemert received his PhD from Harvard University in 1972 after completing work at Andover Newton Theological School and Miami University in Ohio. While a graduate student in the Harvard Department of Social Relations, Lemert studied with Talcott Parsons and Robert Bellah. His dissertation advisor was the theologian Harvey Cox. At the time he completed his dissertation he was a fellow of the Center for Urban Studies (a joint center with MIT and Harvard). He also received an honorary doctorate from the University of the West of England in 2004.

Positions

Lemert is John C. Andrus Emeritus Professor of Sociology at Wesleyan University, where he taught from 1982 to 2010. Currently, he is Senior Fellow of the Center for Comparative Research at Yale University and he teaches at the Boston Graduate School of Psychoanalysis.

In 2014, he was appointed the inaugural Vice Chancellor's Professorial Fellow at the University of South Australia, where he contributes to the Hawke Research Institute. He has delivered numerous public lectures and masterclasses at the Hawke Research Institute, University of South Australia's flagship research institute in the social sciences, humanities and creative arts. Some of his lectures have appeared on programs broadcast by the Australian Broadcasting Corporation (ABC).

Previously, he was Professor of Sociology at Southern Illinois University at Carbondale from 1977 to 1981. He has also held several visiting scholarships at various institutions, including Centre de Sociologie Européenne: Education et Culture, Maison des Sciences de l'Homme, Centre d'Etudes Sociologiques, Trinity College (Connecticut), Columbia University, and MIT. He is a member of the Connecticut Academy of Arts and Sciences.

He is currently Pastoral Associate for the Homeless, Trinity Church on the Green, an Associate in Community Relations and board member, at Neighborhood Housing Services of New Haven, a Vice-Chancellor's Professorial Fellow at The Hawke Institute, University of South Australia, Adelaide, and Senior Research Scholar, Sociology, Yale University.

== Bibliography ==
- Durkheim's Ghosts: Cultural Logics and Social Things (Cambridge University Press, 2006) ISBN 9780521842662
- Thinking the Unthinkable: The Riddles of Classical Social Theories (Paradigm Publishers, 2007) ISBN 9781594511851
- (with Anthony Elliott, Daniel Chaffee, Eric L. Hsu) Globalization: A Reader (Routledge, 2010) ISBN 9780415464772
- The Structural Lie: Small Clues to Global Things (Paradigm, 2011) ISBN 9781594515323
- Why Niebuhr Matters (Yale University Press, 2011) ISBN 9780300175424
- Uncertain Worlds: World-Systems Analysis in Changing Times with Immanuel Wallerstein and Carlos Aguirre Rojas, (Paradigm, 2013) ISBN 9781594519789
- The Souls of W.E.B. Du Bois, with Alford A. Young Jr., Jerry G. Watts, Manning Marable & Elizabeth Higginbotham (Boulder & London: Paradigm Publishers, 2006)
- (with Anthony Elliott) Deadly Worlds: The Emotional Costs of Globalization
  - (Rowman & Littlefield NA, 2006
  - world rights as The New Individualism (Routledge UK, 2005 and 2009) ISBN 9780415560702
  - Rowman & Littlefield, 2005 ISBN 9780742542389
  - Italian: Il nuovo individualismo: I costi emozionali della globalizzazione (Piccola biblioteca Einaudi)
- Social Things (Rowman & Littlefield, 2005; 3e revised & enlarged; 2005). 2e 2001; 1e 1997. ISBN 9781442211629
  - German and Danish editions, 2004
- Postmodernism Is Not What You Think (Paradigm Publishers, 2005
  - second edition (Routledge, 2005) ISBN 9781594511523
  - Portuguese/Brazilian Edition, 2001; with a new preface
- Sociology After the Crisis (Paradigm Publishers, 2004; 2e revised & enlarged). Original publisher: Perseus Books, 1995–2002
- (with Anthony Elliott) Introduction to Contemporary Social Theory (Routledge, 2014) ISBN 9780415525725
- Globalization: An Introduction to the End of the Known World (Routledge/Paradigm, 2015) ISBN 9781612058269
- Americans Thinking: An Introduction to American Social Theory (Routledge/Paradigm, 2018) ISBN 9781138629745
- Uncertain Futures: Theories of Capitalism, (Routledge/Paradigm, 2018).
- (with Kristin Plys), Capitalism and Its Uncertain Future (Routledge, 2021) ISBN 9781032056050
- Silence and Society (Routledge, 2025) ISBN 9781032335490
