= Marcel Utembi Tapa =

Congolese Catholic archbishop

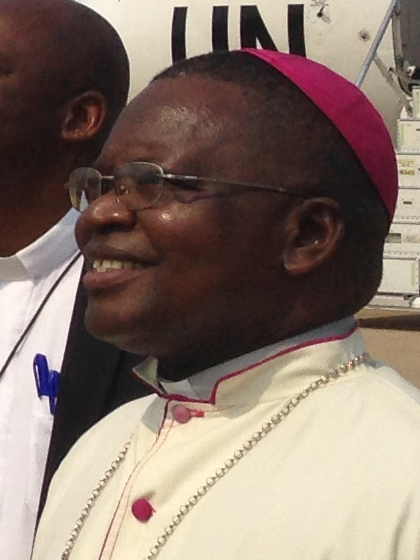
- Archbishop Marcel Utembi Tapa in September 2017.

Personal life
- Born: 7 January 1959 (age 67) Democratic Republic of the Congo

Religious life
- Religion: Roman Catholic

Senior posting
- Present post: Archbishop of the Roman Catholic Archdiocese of Kisangani
- Post: 2008-present
- Previous post: Bishop of the Roman Catholic Diocese of Mahagi–Nioka (2001-2008)

Marcel Utembi Tapa (born 7 January 1959) is a Congolese Roman Catholic prelate who has served as the Archbishop of the Roman Catholic Archdiocese of Kisangani since 28 November 2008. He is also the President of the Episcopal Conference of the Democratic Republic of the Congo (Cenco) since 2016.

Previously, Utembi Tapa has served as the Bishop of the Roman Catholic Diocese of Mahagi–Nioka from 2001 to 2008.
