= Blokwatch =

Belgium-based news website

- Available in: Dutch
- Founded: June 2004
- Dissolved: 2007
- Headquarters: {{{location_country}}}
- No. of locations: Flanders
- Founder: Marc Spruyt
- Key people: Jan Blommaert; Rik Pinxten
- Commercial: No
- Launched: 6 June 2004; 22 years ago
- Current status: Defunct

Blokwatch was the name of a Belgian news site, a virtual archive and documentation centre, and meeting point for research on and about the far right in Flanders. Most of its attention is focuseded on Vlaams Belang (VB; formerly called Vlaams Blok, hence the name "BlokWatch"). Among other things, the site provided the complete version (in Dutch) of the VB party's statutes (Flemish: Basisbeginselen) and the notorious 70-point plan.

It is an independent volunteer initiative, founded by Marc Spruyt (a.k.a. Blokwatcher), author of a number of works on the VB (Grove Borstels, Wat het Vlaams Blok verzwijgt) and who is generally considered the expert on the Far Right in Flanders.

== History ==
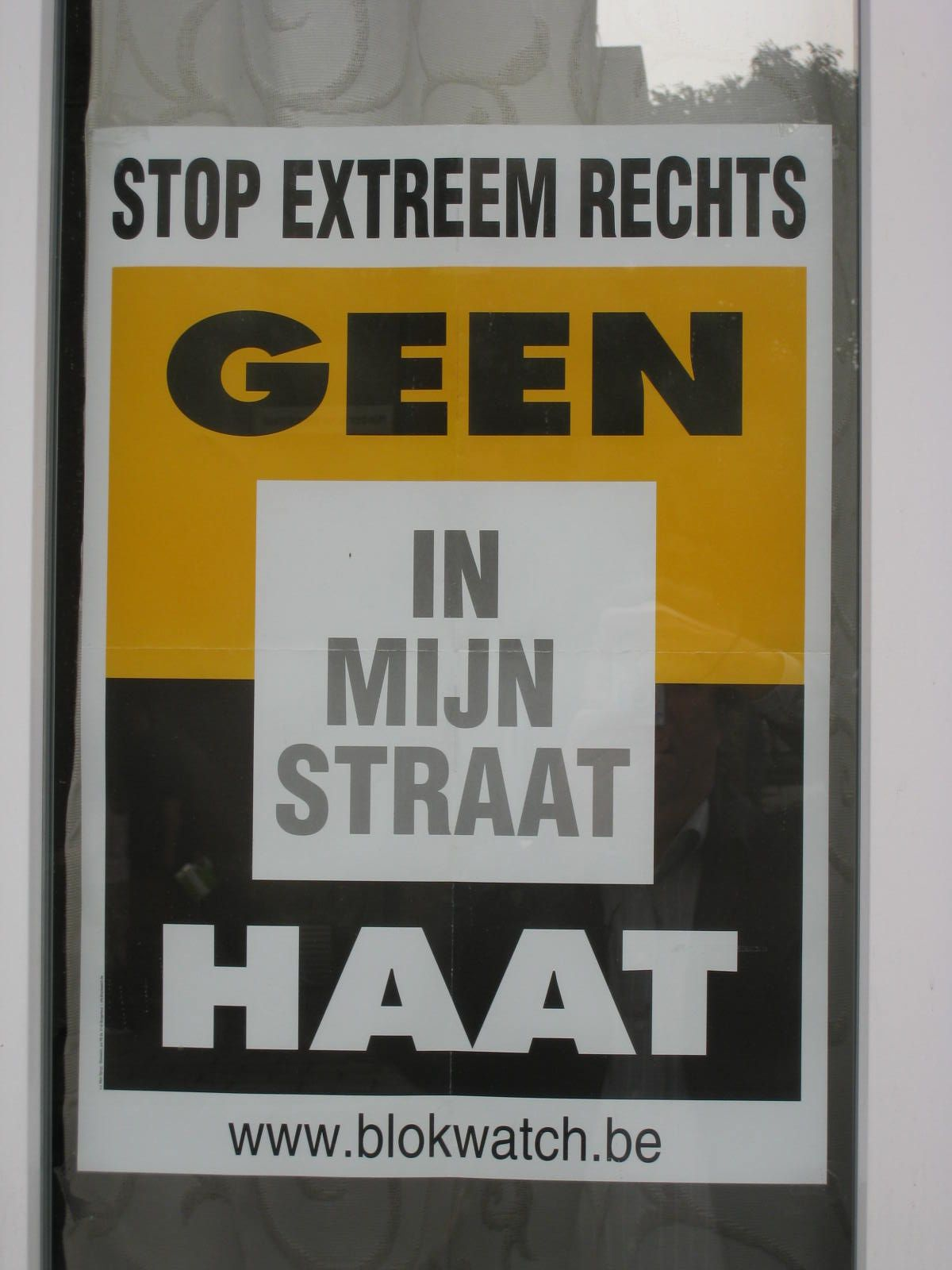
Blokwatch poster

Blokwatch started around June 6, 2004 (one week before the elections of 13 June 2004) as a weblog. It soon became one of the ten most visited Skynet blogs in Belgium.

In early October 2004, an appeal was launched for new cooperators. Eventually, a team of 12 people was assembled that - after consolidating the Blokwatch web log with 3 other web logs (Baron Jéan de Sélys-Longchamps, antifa and vlaamsblok.blogspot) - re-launched the site on 7 January 2005.

On October 2007, Spruyt announced that the Blokwatch site would cease being updated.

== Protection committee ==
The site had a protection committee consisting of:

- Jan Blommaert (professor African languages and cultures University of Ghent, study group Language, Power and Identity Wetenschappelijke Onderzoeksgemeenschap Vlaanderen)
- Ronald Commers (professor Philosophy and Moral sciences University of Ghent, director Center for Ethics and Value Inquiry)
- Dirk Jacobs (professor Groupe d'études sur l'Ethnicité, le Racisme, les Migrations et l'Exclusion (GERME), Sociological Institute, ULB)
- Human Rights League
- Rik Pinxten (professor Comparative Sciences University of Ghent, president Humanistisch Verbond)
- Pieter Saey (professor Geography University of Ghent, Study group World-System analysis)
- Sami Zemni (professor study of the third world University of Ghent, president Centre for Islam in Europe)

== Awards ==
- Democracy Award 2005
  Blokwatch ended third, and received this citation form the organisations "vzw Trefpunt" and "Democratie 2000" that presented the award on July 21, 2005 : "Blokwatch is today the most important source of information on the anti-democratic operation of the far right, especially since a number of quality newspapers have given up their research journalism in this domain."
- Le Prix Raymond Aron pour la démocratie
  Blokwatch received this prize on August 26, 2005 in the Parliament of the French Community of Belgium. It was awarded by the "Centre de Recherche et d’Etudes Politiques" (CREP), a pluralistic and independent foundation because of the receiver's engagement for democracy.

== See also ==
- Anti-fascist research group Kafka, a comparable research and documentation group on right-wing extremism in the Netherlands
