= Belgian Anti-Racism Law =

Anti-Racism Law
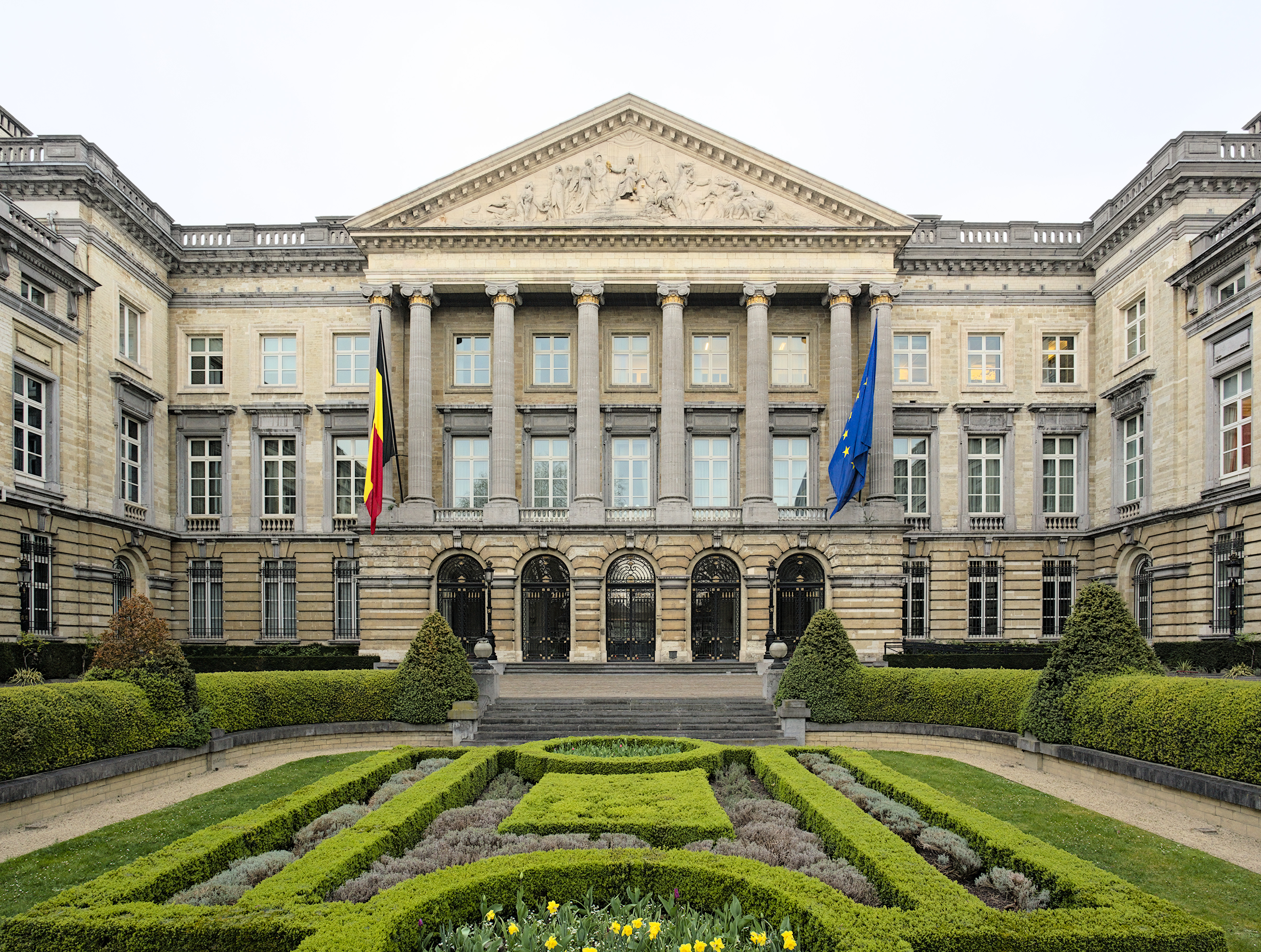

Belgian Federal Parliament
- Long title: Law of 30 July 1981 on the punishment of certain acts inspired by racism or xenophobia
- Citation: Belgian official journal
- Passed by: Chamber of Representatives
- Passed: 12 February 1981
- Passed by: Senate
- Passed: 24 July 1981
- Royal assent: 30 July 1981
- Commenced: 18 August 1981

Legislative history

Initiating chamber: Chamber of Representatives
- Bill title: Law proposal on the punishment of certain acts inspired by racism or xenophobia
- Bill citation: Chamber of Representatives
- Introduced by: Ernest Glinne
- Introduced: 28 June 1979
- Committee report: Report by the Commission for Justice

Revising chamber: Senate
- Bill title: Law proposal on the punishment of certain acts inspired by racism or xenophobia
- Bill citation: Senate
- Received from the Chamber of Representatives: 12 February 1981
- Member(s) in charge: Sent over by the Chamber of Representatives

Keywords
- Criminal law, racism
- Status: Current legislation

The Belgian Anti-Racism Law, in full, the Law of 30 July 1981 on the punishment of certain acts inspired by racism or xenophobia, is a law against hate speech and discrimination passed by the Federal Parliament of Belgium in 1981 which made certain acts motivated by racism or xenophobia illegal. It is also known as the Moureaux Law, as it was proposed to the Parliament by Justice Minister Philippe Moureaux.

== Historical context ==
The first Belgian law proposal against racism was introduced in the wake of the signature by Belgium of the 1965 Convention on the Elimination of All Forms of Racial Discrimination at the Chamber of deputies by the Socialist MP Ernest Glinne on December 1, 1966, at the request of the MRAX (Movement against racism, antisemitism and xenophobia, Belgian equivalent of the French MRAP) which had prepared the proposal. The law proposal was introduced twice in 1966–1967 and again twice in 1968–1969.

On July 20, 1980, a terrorist attack against Jewish children took place in Antwerp (Lamorinièrestraat), then a French-Algerian man was killed on December 4 in Brussels by members of the extreme right wing Front de la jeunesse, and a large antiracist demonstration took place in Brussels. The Justice Minister took the opportunity of this public mood to introduce the law project before the Parliament without consulting the prime minister, and only a few right-wing MPs opposed it, according to him "the far right, some right-wing liberals and a group of Flemish Christian Democrats MPs who had closed links with the South African apartheid regime".

== Content of the law ==
Among others, the following acts were made illegal by the Anti-Racism Law:

- Incitement to discrimination, hatred or violence against a person on account of race, colour, origin or national or ethnic descent, in the circumstances given in Article 444 of the Belgian Penal Code;
- Incitement to discrimination, segregation, hatred or violence against a group, community or its members on account of race, colour, origin or national or ethnic descent, in the circumstances given in Article 444 of the Belgian Penal Code; and
- Announcing the intention to commit any of the aforementioned offences, in the circumstances given in Article 444 of the Belgian Penal Code.

The circumstances given in Article 444 of the Belgian Penal Code are as follows: either in public meetings or places; or in the presence of several people, in a place that is not public but accessible to a number of people who are entitled to meet or visit there; or in any place in the presence of the offended person and in front of witnesses; or through documents, printed or otherwise, illustrations or symbols that have been displayed, distributed, sold, offered for sale, or publicly exhibited; or finally by documents that have not been made public but which have been sent or communicated to several people.

== Evolution of the legislation ==
Main: Law of July 30, 1981 on the punishment of certain acts inspired by racism or xenophobia, published in the Moniteur Belge (M.B.) of August 8, 1981

Further related legislation:

1. Law of February 15, 1993 creating a Centre for Equal Opportunities and Opposition to Racism (M.B. February 19, 1993)
2. Law of April 12, 1994 modifying the Law of July 30, 1981 (M.B. May 14, 1994)
3. Law of March 23, 1995 tending to repress negation, minimization, justification or approbation of the genocide committed by the German National-Socialist regime during the Second World War (Belgian Holocaust denial law)
4. Law of May 7, 1999 modifying the law of July 30, 1981 and the law of March 23, 1995 (M.B. June 25, 1999)
5. Law of June 26, 2000 concerning the introduction of euro in the legislation pertaining to matters referred to in article 78 of the Constitution (M.B. July 29, 2000)
6. Law of January 20, 2003 concerning the reinforcement of legislation against racism (M.B. February 12, 2003 and erratum May 14, 2003)
7. Law of January 23, 2003 concerning the matching of legal dispositions in force with the July 10, 1996 law abolishing death penalty and modifying criminal penalties (M.B. March 13, 2003)
8. Law of May 10, 2007 modifying the July 30, 1981 law concerning marital status, sexual orientation, family background, financial status,... (M.B. May 30, 2007, addendum June 5, 2007)

== Condemnations based on the Law of July 30, 1981 ==
Wim Elbers, a higher police officer who was also a municipal councillor for the far-right Vlaams Blok since 1994 in Brussels, was condemned on December 22, 1999, to a 2,500 Euro fine and a six-month suspended sentence for propagating hate mail on usenet.

The Vlaams Blok itself, through three of its linked associations (Nationalistische Omroep Stichting, Nationalistisch Vormingsinstituut and Vlaamse Concentratie), was condemned on April 21, 2004, by the Ghent court of appeal. Each association was condemned to a fine of 12,394,67 Euro. The civil parties were the Centre for Equal Opportunities and Opposition to Racism and the Human Rights League. The judgment was confirmed on November 9, 2004, by the Court of Cassation, and the party shortly after reorganised itself as the Vlaams Belang.

== See also ==
- List of anti-discrimination acts
- Hate speech
- Hate crime
