= Lode Claes =

Belgian politician (1913–1997)

Senator
- In office 1968–1978

Personal details
- Born: June 1913 Borgerhout
- Died: February 1997 (aged 83) Cadzand
- Party: Volksunie (before 1978); Flemish People's Party (1978-1979); Vlaams Blok (1979)

Lode Claes (June 1913 – February 1997) was a Belgian economics author, journalist and politician who was active within the Flemish nationalist movement.

== Biography ==
Claes studied political and social sciences and law at the Catholic University of Leuven and began training as a lawyer in Antwerp and Munich during the late 1930s. Upon returning to Belgium in 1940, he was drafted into the Belgian army. Following the German invasion of Belgium (1940), Claes was appointed as a civil servant at the National Agriculture and Food Corporation but went into hiding in 1944. After the Second World War, he was accused of being a collaborator due to his work in the civil service during the Nazi occupation and was sentenced to 15 years in prison, but was released early.

=== Politics ===
In 1965, Claes became a member of the Volksunie and was elected as a councilor in Brussels. In 1968, he was elected to the Senate as a directly elected senator for the Brussels arrondissement. In the Senate, he was mainly concerned with financial and economic issues, in which he had an outspoken neoliberal vision In 1975 he ran for the leadership of the Volksunie but lost to Hugo Schiltz. Due to dissatisfaction with the Egmont Pact and disagreements with Schiltz, he left the Volksunie in 1977 and founded his own party: the Flemish People's Party (VVP). His split with the Volksunie coincided with Karel Dillen who had founded the Flemish National Party. The VVP took a more national liberal discourse whereas Dillen's party was seen as radical conservative. Despite the differences, the two formed a cartel (electoral alliance) under the banner Vlaams Blok. Both parties subsequently merged to form Vlaams Blok as a political party. Claes took part in the 1979 European Parliament election under the Flemish People's Party ticket but was not elected and left politics soon after.

=== Later career ===
After politics, Claes initially worked in journalism as a columnist and a director for the Belgian financial-economic magazine Trends. In the early 1990s, he founded a think-tank One October Group. The objective of the think-tank was to create a new party of conservative Christian Democrats, Flemish nationalists and classical liberals. A number of well-known Flemish political and academic figures such as Edwin Truyens, Paul Belien, Raoul Bauer, Boudewijn Bouckaert, Chris Van Sumeren, Jaak Gabriels, Gerolf Annemans and Guy Verhofstadt became members of the think-tank and it had ties to the Party for Freedom and Progress and later set the groundwork for forming the Open VLD party, although Claes did not take part in founding the VLD and did not become a member.

Claes died in 1997.
