= 1989 Brussels regional election =

Regional election in Brussels, Belgium

1989 Brussels Regional Council election
- 18 June 1989

75 seats to the Brussels Regional Council

A regional election was held in Belgium on 18 June 1989 to elect representatives to the first Brussels Regional Council, which replaced the Brussels Agglomeration Council as a result of the creation of the Brussels-Capital Region. Elections to the European Parliament were held on the same day.

A total of 75 seats were up for election, of which 64 went to French-speaking parties and 11 to Dutch-speaking parties.

== Background ==
The constitutional revision of 1970 provided for three Regions: the Flemish Region, the Walloon Region and the Brussels Region. However, no regional institutions were created until 1980, when the Flemish Council and the Flemish Executive were created for the Flemish Region and the Walloon Council and Walloon Executive for the Walloon Region. A Brussels Agglomeration comprising the 19 municipalities which today form the Brussels Region had already been established in 1971, but no regional institutions were created for Brussels until 1989 because of political disagreements on the subject.

The Brussels Regional Council was the first of the three Regional Councils to be directly elected, as the Flemish Council and the Walloon Council consisted, respectively, of the Flemish and the Walloon members of the Belgian Federal Parliament, however, the Council of the German-speaking Community had already been directly elected since 1974. The first direct elections for the Flemish and Walloon Councils took place in 1995, since then all regional elections are held on the same day and once every 5 years.

== Results ==
Party	Votes	%	Seats
Socialist Party	96,189	21.95	18
Liberal Reformist Party	83,011	18.94	15
Democratic Front of Francophones	64,489	14.72	12
Christian Social Party	51,904	11.85	9
Ecolo	44,874	10.24	8
Christian People's Party	18,523	4.23	4
National Front	14,392	3.28	2
Party of Freedom and Progress	12,143	2.77	2
Flemish Socialist Party	11,710	2.67	2
People's Union	9,053	2.07	1
Flemish Block	9,006	2.06	1
Agalev	4,821	1.10	1
Party of New Forces	4,190	0.96	–
LIBRE	3,976	0.91	–
VERS.G.A.	2,558	0.58	–
LA	2,290	0.52	–
PTB	1,283	0.29	–
POS	1,229	0.28	–
BRU	832	0.19	–
Workers' Party of Belgium	519	0.12	–
PFU	405	0.09	–
PLI	402	0.09	–
SAP	393	0.09	–
Total	438,192	100.00	75
Valid votes	438,192	91.73	
Invalid/blank votes	39,497	8.27	
Total votes	477,689	100.00	
Registered voters/turnout	582,947	81.94	
Source: Belgian Elections
