= Ignace Lowie =

Belgian politician (born 1958)

Municipal Councillor of Bruges
- Incumbent
- Assumed office 2018

Member of the Chamber of Representatives
- In office 21 May 1995 – 13 June 2010

Personal details
- Born: 2 June 1958 (age 67) Roeselare, Belgium
- Party: Vlaams Belang (2004-2010, 2018-)
- Other political affiliations: Volksunie (before 1985); Vlaams Blok (1985-2010); CD&V (2010-2017)

Ignace Lowie (born 2 June 1958) is a Belgian politician, economist, journalist and former parliamentarian of the Vlaams Blok and successor Vlaams Belang party in the Chamber of Representatives.

== Biography ==
Lowie was born in Roeselare. His father worked as a carpenter. After leaving high school, he obtained a bachelor's degree in economics and worked as a civil servant at the Belgian Ministry of Finance.

He became a supporter of the Volksunie party as a teenager. In 1990 he joined the Flemish linguistic rights group Were Di and became a politics and economics reporter and then editor for the nationalist magazine Dietsland-Europe. In 1985 he joined the Vlaams Blok due to disagreements with the Volksunie's course. He left his job as a civil servant in 1990 to work as a secretary for the Vlaams Blok's group on the Flemish council (now the Flemish Parliament). In the 1995 Belgian federal election, he was elected to the Chamber of Representatives for Vlaams Blok and then its successor Vlaams Belang. He was also a councilor in Berchem for the VB from 1993 to 2001. He lost his seat in parliament in 2010 and left the Vlaams Belang due to internal instability in the party. Afterwards, he announced his intention to join the CD&V party and was elected as a candidate for them in Antwerp before moving to Bruges. In 2018, he rejoined the Vlaams Belang and is a councilor for the party in Bruges.
