= 1995 Belgian federal election =

← 1991	21 May 1995	1999 →
- Chamber of Representatives
- All 150 seats in the Chamber of Representatives; 76 seats needed for a majority
- Turnout: 91.15%
Party	Leader	Vote %	Seats	+/–
CVP	Jean-Luc Dehaene	17.18	29	−10
VLD	Guy Verhofstadt	13.15	21	−5
Socialistische	Philippe Busquin	12.56	20	−8
Socialiste	Louis Tobback	11.87	21	−14
PRL–FDF	Louis Michel	10.26	18	−5
Vlaams Blok	Karel Dillen	7.83	11	−1
PSC	Gérard Deprez	7.73	12	−6
People's Union	Bert Anciaux	4.67	5	−5
Agalev	Johan Malcorps	4.43	5	−2
Ecolo	Olivier Deleuze	4.01	6	−4
National Front	Daniel Féret	2.28	2	+1
This lists parties that won seats. See the complete results below.
- Senate
- 40 of the 71 seats in the Senate; 36 seats needed for a majority
- Turnout: 91.15%
Party	Vote %	Seats
CVP	16.85	12
VLD	13.29	10
Socialistische	13.23	9
Socialiste	12.76	11
PRL–FDF	11.23	9
Vlaams Blok	7.74	5
PSC	7.25	7
People's Union	5.31	3
Ecolo	4.32	3
Agalev	3.73	2
This lists parties that won seats. See the complete results below.

Government before	Government after election
Dehaene I CVP-PSC-PS-SP	Dehaene II; CVP-PSC-PS-SP

Federal elections were held in Belgium on 21 May 1995 to elect members of the Chamber of Representatives and Senate. The Christian People's Party (CVP) kept its position as largest party in Flanders and overall in Belgium, and Jean-Luc Dehaene (CVP) continued as Prime Minister.

On the same day, regional elections were also held. These were the first elections after the new 1993 Belgian Constitution, which turned Belgium formally into a federal state. The new Constitution also reduced the number of seats in the Chamber (from 212 to 150) and in the Senate (from 70 to 40 directly elected senators).

== Results ==
=== Chamber of Representatives ===
Party	Votes	%	Seats	+/–
Christian People's Party	1,042,933	17.18	29	–10
Flemish Liberals and Democrats	798,363	13.15	21	–5
Socialistische Partij	762,444	12.56	20	–8
Parti Socialiste	720,819	11.87	21	–14
Liberal Reformist Party–Democratic Front of Francophones	623,250	10.26	18	–5
Vlaams Blok	475,677	7.83	11	–1
Christian Social Party	469,101	7.73	12	–6
People's Union	283,516	4.67	5	–5
Agalev	269,058	4.43	5	–2
Ecolo	243,362	4.01	6	–4
National Front	138,496	2.28	2	+1
BANAAN	40,098	0.66	0	New
Aging with Dignity (Wallonia)	26,227	0.43	0	New
Aging with Dignity (Flanders)	25,195	0.41	0	New
Workers' Party of Belgium (Flanders)	20,997	0.35	0	0
Agir	15,374	0.25	0	0
Unitarist and Centrist	13,878	0.23	0	New
Workers' Party of Belgium (Wallonia)	13,250	0.22	0	0
Belgium–Europe–Belgium	10,186	0.17	0	0
Flemish People's Party	8,480	0.14	0	New
WALLON	6,462	0.11	0	New
Communist Party	6,277	0.10	0	0
Natural Law Party	5,314	0.09	0	New
Youth	5,243	0.09	0	New
Party of German-speaking Belgians	4,426	0.07	0	New
EMPLOI	3,812	0.06	0	New
PSP	2,939	0.05	0	New
Employment is Investing in the Future	2,936	0.05	0	New
Workers' Party of Belgium	2,852	0.05	0	0
Parti Communautaire National-Européen	2,554	0.04	0	0
Solidarity, Universality, Human Rights–BEB	2,412	0.04	0	0
White	2,410	0.04	0	New
Rally for the Freedom of the Belgians	1,892	0.03	0	New
PLUS	1,705	0.03	0	New
Renovators	1,606	0.03	0	New
General Union of Total Independents	1,603	0.03	0	New
PLN	1,478	0.02	0	New
D	1,471	0.02	0	New
General Association of the Elderly	1,274	0.02	0	New
List for Europe, Workers and Democracy	1,270	0.02	0	New
Democratic Union of the Francophones	1,179	0.02	0	New
Union and Democratic Renewal	1,009	0.02	0	New
UL	907	0.01	0	New
Radical Alliance	882	0.01	0	New
ADM	831	0.01	0	New
LIGUE	808	0.01	0	New
Front regional wallon	750	0.01	0	New
Volksnationalitische Partij	670	0.01	0	New
RVM	566	0.01	0	New
DSA	536	0.01	0	New
United Feminist Party	533	0.01	0	New
ADD	506	0.01	0	New
DLL	450	0.01	0	New
Parti Communautaire National-Européen	441	0.01	0	0
BEBEL	393	0.01	0	New
Protection of the Animals	329	0.01	0	New
National Interest	311	0.01	0	New
Referendum	310	0.01	0	New
Total	6,072,051	100.00	150	–72
Valid votes	6,072,051	92.53		
Invalid/blank votes	490,098	7.47		
Total votes	6,562,149	100.00		
Registered voters/turnout	7,199,440	91.15		
Source: Belgian Elections, Global Elections Database

=== Senate ===
Party	Votes	%	Seats			
Party	Votes	%	Won	Community	Co-opted	Total
Christian People's Party	1,009,656	16.85	7	3	2	12
Flemish Liberals and Democrats	796,154	13.29	6	2	2	10
Socialistische Partij	792,941	13.23	6	2	1	9
Parti Socialiste	764,610	12.76	5	4	2	11
Liberal Reformist Party–Democratic Front of Francophones	672,798	11.23	5	3	1	9
Vlaams Blok	463,896	7.74	3	1	1	5
Christian Social Party	434,492	7.25	3	3	1	7
People's Union	318,453	5.31	2	1	0	3
Ecolo	258,635	4.32	2	1	0	3
Agalev	223,355	3.73	1	1	0	2
Aging with Dignity (Wallonia)	32,913	0.55	0	0	0	0
BANAAN	31,956	0.53	0	0	0	0
SAMUEL	31,392	0.52	0	0	0	0
VLAAMS	22,632	0.38	0	0	0	0
Workers' Party of Belgium (Flanders)	21,607	0.36	0	0	0	0
HOERA	20,790	0.35	0	0	0	0
Aging with Dignity (Flanders)	20,426	0.34	0	0	0	0
Workers' Party of Belgium (Wallonia)	16,667	0.28	0	0	0	0
United Left	15,994	0.27	0	0	0	0
Party of German-speaking Belgians	13,762	0.23	0	0	0	0
Parti Communautaire National-Européen	10,058	0.17	0	0	0	0
D	7,567	0.13	0	0	0	0
Flemish People's Party	7,187	0.12	0	0	0	0
Natural Law Party	4,384	0.07	0	0	0	0
Total	5,992,325	100.00	40	21	10	71
Valid votes	5,992,325	91.32				
Invalid/blank votes	569,783	8.68				
Total votes	6,562,108	100.00				
Registered voters/turnout	7,199,440	91.15				
Source: Belgian Elections, IPU
