= Herman Suykerbuyk =

Belgian politician (1934–2026)

- Suykerbuyk in 1993

Member of the Senate of Belgium for Antwerp Province
- In office 13 December 1987 – 20 May 1995

Member of the Chamber of Representatives of Belgium
- In office 31 March 1968 – 12 December 1987

Member of the Flemish Council/Flemish Parliament
- In office 7 November 1981 – 12 June 1999

Cultural Council for the Dutch Cultural Community
- In office 7 December 1971 – 7 November 1981

Personal details
- Born: 5 January 1934 Kapellen, Belgium
- Died: 21 February 2026 (aged 92) Essen, Belgium
- Party: CVP
- Education: Catholic University of Leuven
- Occupation: Civil servant

Herman Suykerbuyk (5 January 1934 – 21 February 2026) was a Belgian politician of the Christian People's Party (CVP).

== Life and career ==
Born in Kapellen on 5 January 1934, Suykerbuyk studied law at the Catholic University of Leuven from 1952 to 1957, when he was a member of the Katholiek Vlaams Hoogstudentenverbond. He was first elected to the Chamber of Representatives in 1968, where he served until 1987. He was also a member of the Cultural Council for the Dutch Cultural Community from 1971 to 1981, which became the Flemish Council and later the Flemish Parliament. He served there until 1999. He was also a Senator from 1987 to 1995.

In the Flemish Parliament, Suykerbuyk was most well known for the controversial "Suykerbuyk decree", which sought to provide reparations for Nazi collaborationists punished in the aftermath of World War II and others harmed by repression. The decree was approved by the People's Union, Vlaams Blok, and the CVP, which broke the cordon sanitaire to support the measure, though it was overturned by the Court of Arbitration in 1999. In the Senate, he abstained from the 1995 vote on the Belgian Holocaust denial law.

Suykerbuyk died in Essen on 21 February 2026, at the age of 92.
