= Hugo Schiltz =

Belgian lawyer and politician (1927–2006)

- Born: 27 October 1927; Borsbeek, Belgium
- Died: 5 August 2006 (aged 78); Antwerp, Belgium
- Occupation(s): Lawyer, politician

Hugo Schiltz (27 October 1927 – 5 August 2006) was a Belgian lawyer and politician. He was Belgian MP from 1965 to 1988 and senator from 1992 to 1995. He was also twice minister, from 1981 to 1985 in the first Flemish Government and between 1988 and 1991 in the Belgian federal government Martens VIII. He was further president of the Flemish political party Volksunie between 1975 and 1979.

He was one of the founders of federalism in Belgium. After the dissolution of the Volksunie, he chose the new party Spirit.

== Career ==
During World War II Schiltz was a member of the Nationaal-Socialistische Jeugd Vlaanderen (National Socialist Youth Flanders). This led to him being jailed for some months after the war.

He studied law, economic science and Thomistic philosophy at KU Leuven, where he became a member of the Katholiek Vlaams Hoogstudentenverbond (Catholic Flemish Students Union). In 1953 he became a lawyer and an economics teacher.

In 1958, he was elected member of the Antwerp municipal council, which he would remain until 1998.

After a short period with the Christian People's Party, he became a member of the Volksunie in 1963. From 1975 to 1979 he was party president. During that time, he steered the party into a more social liberalism direction. He participated in drawing up the 1977 Egmont pact, which was seen as treason by more hard line advocates from the Flemish Movement. The Belgian government didn't survive the disapproval of the pact in parliament.

The new, more liberal direction of the Volksunie, and the cooperation in the Egmont pact were the reason for the creation by the more radical, right wing-conservative part of the Volksunie, of two new small parties, the Vlaams Nationale Partij (Flemish National Party, VNP), and the Vlaamse Volkspartij (Flemish Popular Party, VVP). Later, both parties merged into the Vlaams Blok.

Together with Wilfried Martens and Jean-Luc Dehaene, Hugo Schiltz was instrumental in the ongoing State reform in Belgium (five constitutional updates during Shiltz's lifetime, continued thereafter), which saw some of the basics of the defunct Egmont past enacted, making Belgium a federal state recognizing the communities, regions and language areas of Belgium.

From 1994 to 1998, Schiltz was alderman for finances in Antwerp in an anti-Vlaams Blok coalition.

In 1995 he received the honorary title of Minister of State from Albert II of Belgium.

After the dissolution of the Volksunie into the New Flemish Alliance and Sociaal-Liberale Partij in 2001, Schiltz became a member of the latter. In that year, he resumed practising law, first with Ernst & Young and Peeters Advocaten, later he founded Laurius-Schiltz-Verschoeven ADVC.

Willem-Frederik Schiltz, his son by his second marriage, is an Open Flemish Liberals and Democrats politician who has served as a Belgian Senator and as a member of the Flemish Parliament (a language/community based parliament that emerged from the state reforms the senior Schiltz helped introduce).

== Death ==
Hugo Schiltz died 5 August 2006 in Antwerp of leukemia.
