= Belgian Holocaust denial law =

The Belgian Negationism law (or Belgian Revisionism law), passed on 23 March 1995, bans public denial of Nazi genocide war crimes like the Holocaust. Specifically, this law against negationism makes it illegal to publicly "deny, play down, justify or approve of the genocide committed by the German National Socialist regime during the Second World War". Prosecution is led by the Belgian Centre for Equal Opportunities. The offense is punishable by imprisonment of up to one year and fines of up to 2,500 EUR.

== Legislative history ==
The negationism bill, drafted by Claude Eerdekens and Yvan Mayeur of the Parti Socialiste, was introduced in the Chamber of Representatives by Eerdekens (PS), Marcel Cheron (Ecolo), Marcel Colla (SP), Yvan Mayeur (PS), Luc Dhoore (CVP), Raymond Langendries (CDH), Louis Michel (MR) and Mieke Vogels (Agalev) on 30 June 1992.

The bill passed the Chamber of Representatives on 2 February 1995, with 194 votes in favour, 0 against and 0 abstentions.

The bill passed the Senate on 14 March 1995, with 131 votes in favour, 0 against and 1 abstention of Senator Herman Suykerbuyk (CVP), author of a 1996 Flemish decree placing on the same level victims of the Nazi occupation and "victims" of the post World War II repression.

The Flemish ultranationalist political party Vlaams Blok, the predecessor of Vlaams Belang, voted for the law, "out of a desire for respectability and to break out of its political isolation", even though its leadership "contained Holocaust deniers".

King Albert II signed and promulgated the bill on 23 March 1995. The Act was published in the Belgian Official Journal on 30 March 1995 and entered into force on the same day.

== Freedom of expression ==
In the past, adversaries of the law have argued that this law restricts the freedom of expression, which is a basic human right. In a decision of 24 June 2003, the European Court of Human Rights (ECtHR) stated that "denying or minimising the Holocaust must be seen as one of the acutest forms of racial slandering and incentives to hatred towards the Jews. The negation or the revision of historical facts of this type call into question the values which found the fight against racism and anti-semitism and is likely to seriously disturb law and order. Attacks against the rights of others of this kind are incompatible with democracy and human rights and their authors incontestably have aims that are prohibited by article 17 of the Convention." The court concludes that in application of article 17 of the ECHR, the plaintiff can't appeal to the protection of article 10 ECHR, insofar that he wants to use the freedom of expression to dispute crimes against humanity.

== Convictions ==
On 14 April 2005, the Antwerp Court of Appeal convicted Siegfried Verbeke to 1 year imprisonment and a fine of 2,500 EUR, based on this law. The court also suspended his civic rights for a period of 10 years. The Centre for Equal Opportunities and the Belgian Auschwitz Foundation each received symbolic damages of 1 EUR.

In February 2021 started the prosecution of members of the Flemish nationalist youth organization "Schild & Vrienden" for violations on the Antiracism Act, the Negationism Act and the Arms Act in Belgium. In their chatrooms they were sharing sexist, racist, anti-Semitic and violent content. On 12 March 2024 seven defendants on trial were found guilty of violations on the Racism and Negationism Act. Their leader Dries Van Langenhove was also convicted of violations on the Arms Act. He received up to one year of effective imprisonment and a fine of 16,000 euros. In addition, Van Langenhove was disqualified from his political rights for 10 years. An employee of Vlaams Belang in the European Parliament, who had previous convictions, received eight months in prison with a suspended sentence and a fine of 8,000 euros. Joeri Van Olmen, local Vlaams Belang chairman in the city of Sint-Niklaas, and three other convicts received a one-year prison sentence with a six-month reprieve and a fine 8,000 euro, half of which was suspended. One convict received a suspension of sentence because he showed genuine remorse and apologised for his actions, which he explicitly renounced.

== Possible expansions ==
In June 2005, a reform of the law was debated in the Belgian Senate in order to extend its scope to the negation of other genocides, e.g. the Armenian genocide and the Rwandan genocide. Due to political and public controversy about the legal qualification of the Armenian genocide, the reform was postponed. Negation of the Armenian genocide has been systematically used as an electoral campaigning tool by Turkish candidates (from all parties) and organisations during Belgian elections since 1999, making it electorally difficult for some parties to take a clear stance on making it illegal.

== See also ==
- Holocaust denial
- Historical revisionism (negationism)
