= Robert Steuckers =

Belgian far-right activist and writer

- Born: 8 January 1956 (age 70); Uccle, Belgium
- Occupations: Activist; writer
- Movement: European New Right

Robert Steuckers (born 8 January 1956) is a Belgian writer and political activist on the far right, associated with the European New Right. He is a former member of GRECE and formed his own organisation Synergies européennes in 1994. He promotes pan-European nationalism and has been described as close to the Identitarian movement.

== Life and political activity ==
Robert Steuckers was born in Uccle, Belgium, on 8 January 1956. He is Flemish but nearly bilingual in Dutch and French. He joined Alain de Benoist's French New Right organisation GRECE in 1973 and left it for the first time in 1981 to found his own similar group, Études, recherches, et orientations européennes (lit. 'European studies, research, and orientations').

From 1983 to 1999, Steuckers published the journal Vouloir (lit. 'Will'). In 1985, he and the fellow New Rightists Guillaume Faye and Pierre Freson wrote the brochure Little Lexicon of the European Partisan that was distributed by the far-right groups Third Way and Forces Nouvelles. Around 1990, Steuckers functioned as a link between the European New Right and the Russian far-right thinker Aleksandr Dugin. Dugin was influenced by articles in Steuckers' journals Orientations and Vouloir. The two met in July 1990, and it was Steuckers who introduced Dugin to geopolitics and the term National Bolshevism.

Having left GRECE for a second time in 1993, Steuckers founded the organisation Synergies européennes (SE; lit. 'European synergies') in 1994 and was joined by other New Rightists who had fallen out with de Benoist. SE promotes a Eurasianist ideology distinct from Dugin's Russian project, envisioning a political axis of Paris, Berlin and Moscow. A prominent member became the Romanian Jean Parvulesco, who envisioned a political union of white people. SE has never attracted the same media attention as GRECE, but figured in public discussions when some of its academic members were accused of having created a New Right faculty at the Jean Moulin University Lyon 3. Steuckers operates the associated website Euro-Synergies, which publishes articles and essays in favour of pan-European nationalism and against liberalism and globalism. He describes himself as a métapolitologue, with which he means a metapolitical political scientist. For periods, Steuckers was close to the Belgian far-right parties, New Belgian Front and Vlaams Blok.

== Views ==
The scholar José Pedro Zúquete describes Steuckers' positions as having moved from the New Right to become closer to the Identitarian movement. He is known for his interest in the Conservative Revolution of interwar Germany. He co-wrote works with Armin Mohler, a writer associated with the Conservative Revolution, whom he considers to be his mentor.

In the Little Lexicon of the European Partisan, Steuckers promotes tragedy as a central component of the "pagan conception-of-the-world" he subscribes to. The book describes the tragic sensibility as distinct from pessimism, and defines it as a view of human existence as "random, risky, threatened by death and devoid of any other finality than the one imprinted upon it, through combat and challenges faced, by human will".

Steuckers opposes the existence of immigrant communities in Europe, describing them as "ethnic groups passing through, not assimilated because there are too many of them, [and who] develop parallel economies in order to survive, which, unfortunately, too often lead to Mafia networks."

Steuckers has criticised de Benoist and GRECE for several reasons. He says their conception of metapolitics is sterile and detached from reality. His view of geopolitics and jurisprudence as central to concrete political organisation differs from GRECE's project. He is critical of de Benoist's acceptance of permanent immigrant communities in Europe. Fluent in German, he has criticised French New Rightists for having a lack of understanding of the language despite relying heavily on German sources.
