= Dutch Block =

Dutch Block Nederlands Blok
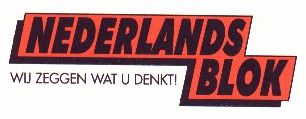
- Chairman: Wim Vreeswijk
- Founded: 1992
- Dissolved: ~2000
- Ideology: Dutch nationalism Right-wing populism
- Colours: Vermilion

The Dutch Block (Dutch: Nederlands Blok, NB) was a Dutch nationalist political party espousing an anti-immigrant program. It was founded by Alfred Vierling, Ton Steemers en Hans Lindenburg, modeled on the Flemish Block and later taken over by Wim Vreeswijk, who became council member in Utrecht.

The party was founded in 1992. It had a seat in the municipal council of Utrecht from 1994 to 2000, where Wim Vreeswijk was elected. From 1994 to 1997, it also had a seat in Almelo. The elected councillor there, Henry Oudendijk, was originally a member of Centrum Democraten, but changed parties after two months; in March 1997, he left Nederlands Blok and continued as an independent member.

== Sources ==
- (in Dutch) Anti-fascist research group Kafka documentation on the Dutch Blok
