= 1994 European Parliament election in Belgium =

- 12 June 1994

25 seats to the European Parliament
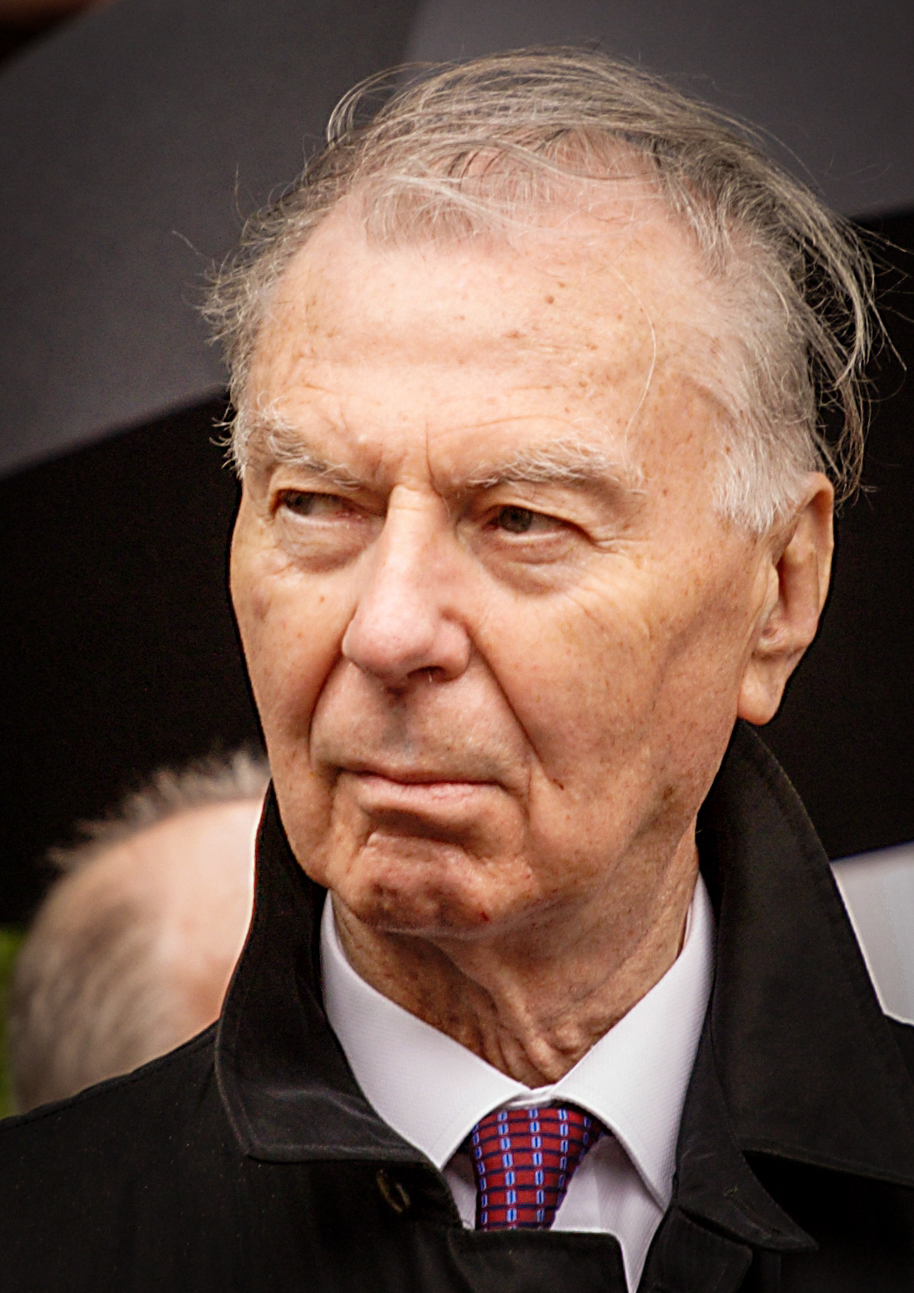

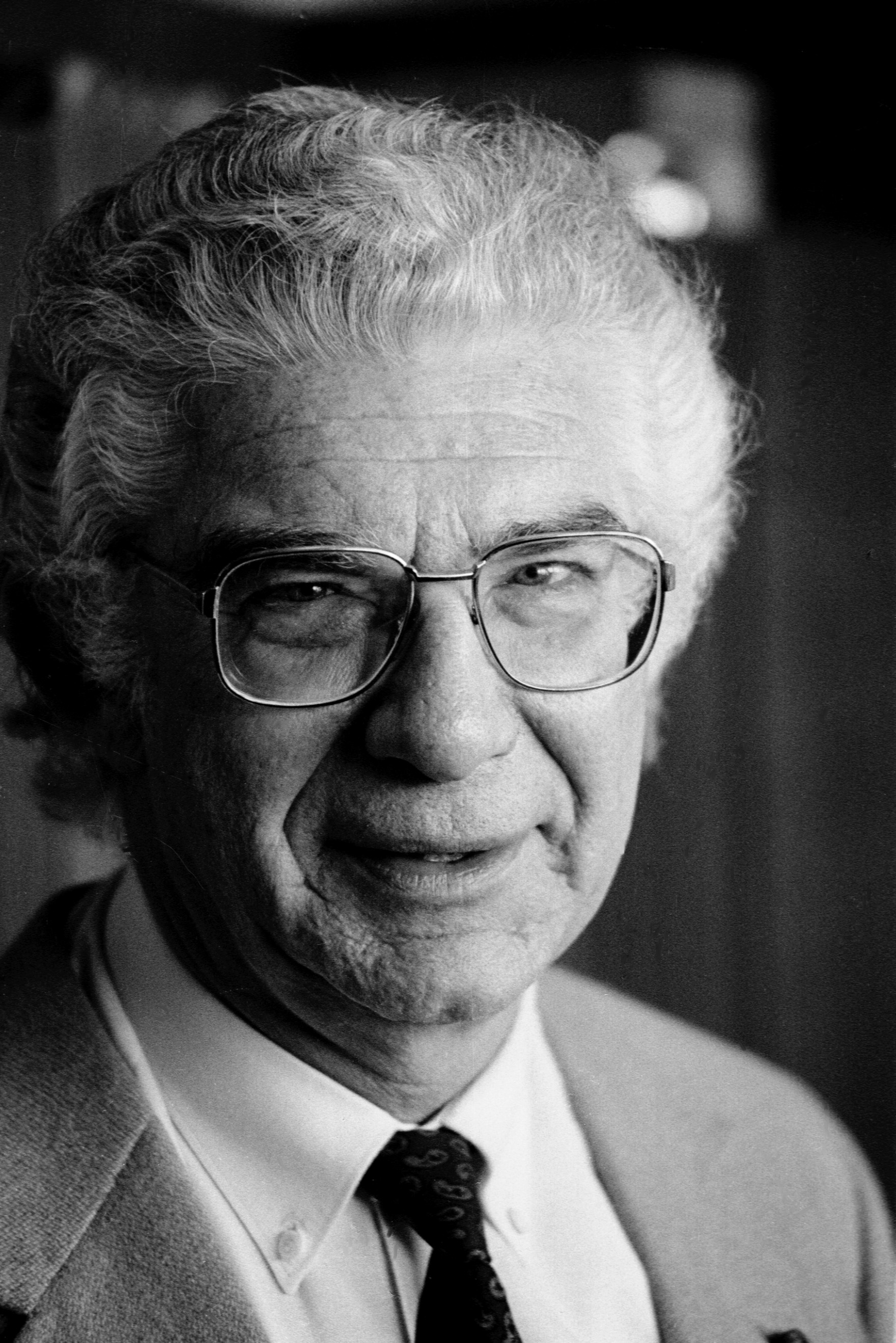

	First party	Second party
Leader	Leo Tindemans	José Happart
Party	CVP	PS
Alliance	EPP	PES
Last election	4 seats, 21.14%	5 seats, 14.48%
Seats won	4	3
Seat change	Steady	▼2
Popular vote	1,013,266	680,142
Percentage	16.98%	11.40%
Swing	▼4.16%	▼3.08%
	Third party	Fourth party
Leader	Willy De Clercq	Freddy Willockx
Party	Open Vld	Flemish Socialist Party
Alliance	ALDE	PES
Last election	2 seats, 10.60%	3 seats, 12.43%
Seats won	3	3
Seat change	▲1	Steady
Popular vote	678,421	651,371
Percentage	11.37%	10.92%
Swing	▲0.77%	▼1.51%

Elections to the European Parliament were held in Belgium on 12 June 1994. The Dutch-speaking electoral college elected 14 MEPs, the French-speaking electoral college elected 10 MEPs and the German-speaking electoral college elected 1 MEP.

== Results ==
Party	Votes	%	Seats
French-speaking electoral college
Socialist Party	680,142	30.44	3
Liberal Reformist Party	541,724	24.25	3
Christian Social Party	420,198	18.81	2
Ecolo	290,859	13.02	1
National Front	175,732	7.87	1
Agir	42,917	1.92	0
United Left	35,977	1.61	0
Workers' Party of Belgium	17,454	0.78	0
Solidarity, Universality, Human Rights	14,054	0.63	0
List for Europe, Workers and Democracy	8,822	0.39	0
Humanist Party	6,385	0.29	0
Total	2,234,264	100.00	10
Dutch-speaking electoral college
Christian People's Party	1,013,266	27.43	4
Flemish Liberals and Democrats	678,421	18.36	3
Flemish Socialist Party	651,371	17.63	3
Vlaams Blok	463,919	12.56	2
Agalev	396,198	10.73	1
People's Union	262,043	7.09	1
Aging with Dignity	127,504	3.45	0
Workers' Party of Belgium	41,816	1.13	0
Belgium–Europe–Belgium	24,132	0.65	0
Natural Law Party	19,930	0.54	0
Red–Green Movement	15,549	0.42	0
Total	3,694,149	100.00	14
German-speaking electoral college
Christian Social Party–European People's Party	11,999	31.29	1
Partei für Freiheit und Fortschritt	7,690	20.06	0
Party of German-speaking Belgians	5,945	15.51	0
Ecolo	5,714	14.90	0
Socialist Party	4,820	12.57	0
Juropa	1,969	5.14	0
Workers' Party of Belgium	205	0.53	0
Total	38,342	100.00	1
Valid votes	5,966,755	91.26	
Invalid/blank votes	571,213	8.74	
Total votes	6,537,968	100.00	
Registered voters/turnout	7,211,311	90.66	
Source: Belgian Elections
