= Agir (Belgium) =

- Founder: Willy Freson; Robert Destordeur; Robert Steuckers
- Founded: 1989
- Dissolved: 1997
- Succeeded by: Front National
- Headquarters: Wallonia, Belgium
- Ideology: Cultural nationalism Identity politics
- Political position: Far-right

Agir (Act) was a Belgian far-right political party active in Wallonia. The party existed from 1989 to 1997 and elected representatives at a provincial and municipal level.

The initial base of Agir was the Liège branch of the Parti des forces nouvelles (PFN). The PFN had endured poor electoral results as well as adverse publicity following a brawl with police at the Brussels International Book Festival, resulting in the Liège going their own way in 1989. The three founding leaders of Agir were Willy Freson, a one-tine leading activist in the Front de la Jeunesse, Robert Destordeur, a member of the PFN secretariat and Robert Steuckers, the main ideologue of the Nouvelle droite tendency in Belgium.

The party belonged to an authoritarian and xenophobic ideology of the far-right, eschewing the neoliberalism that was growing in importance at the time. The party however rejected the biological racism of its PFN predecessor, preferring instead to emphasise cultural nationalism and identity politics. It strongly supported the repatriation of immigrants. They described themselves as an "opposition popular party" and rejected the label of extreme right.

Agir were ideologically close to the Groupement de recherche et d'études pour la civilisation européenne (GRECE) and members of the party took place in a number of GRECE conferences. Although of a firmly Walloon identity Agir also sought good relations with the Vlaams Blok. Externally, the party established connections with the German League for People and Homeland and the French National Front as well as individual activists within the neo-Nazi subculture.

The party held seats in the Liège Provincial Council as well as the Municipal Councils within the region. The 4.7% of the vote they captured in the 1991 Provincial election was enough to ensure that Freson captured a seat. However, never operating outside its Liège stronghold, in 1997 the group merged with the Front National (FN). With the FN in disarray at the time, the arrival of the Agir activists led to something of a revival in that party's fortunes.
