= Daniel Féret =

Belgian politician

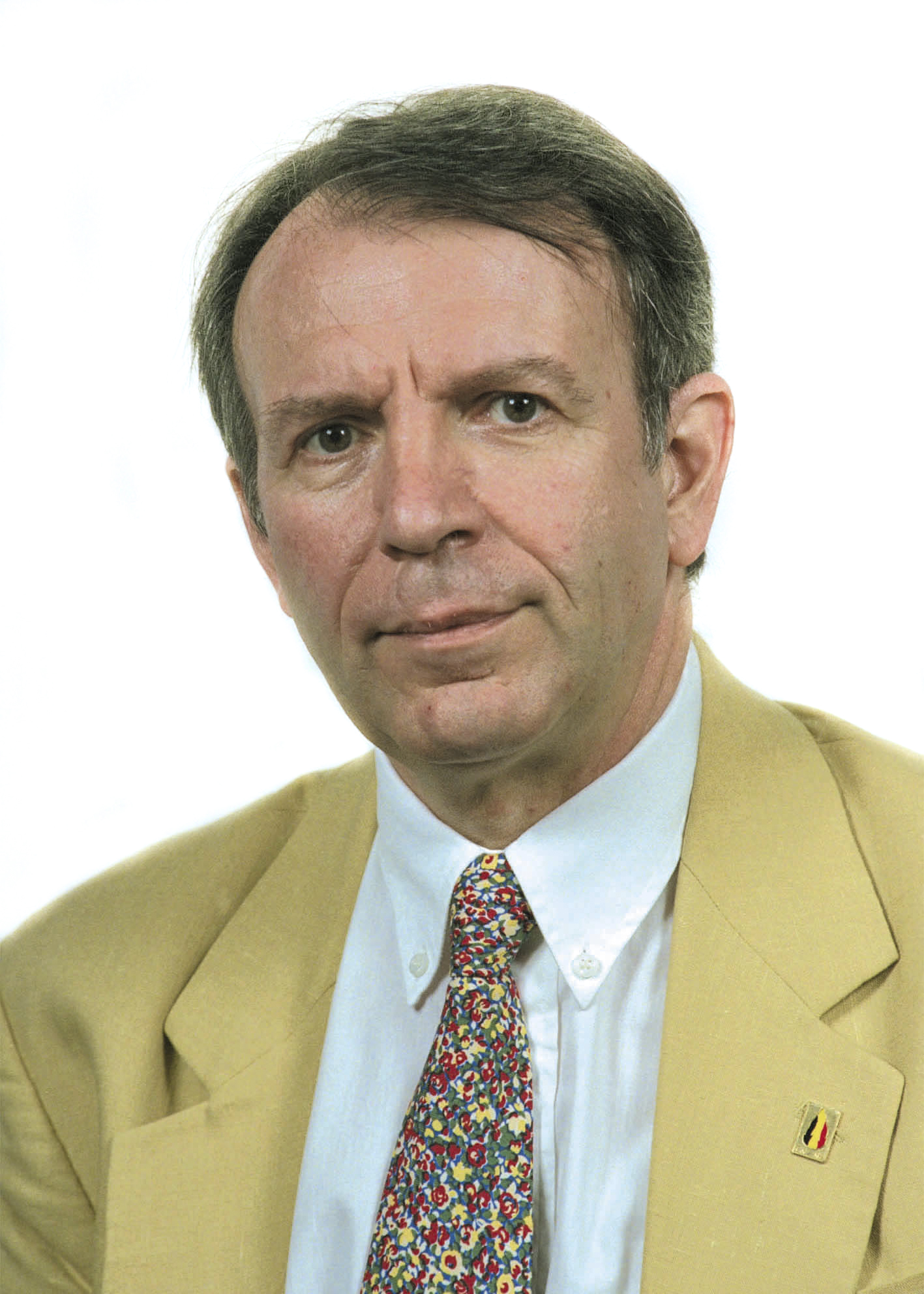
- Féret in 1994

Member of the European Parliament
- In office 19 July 1994 – 20 July 1999
- Constituency: French-speaking electoral college

Personal details
- Born: 7 August 1944 (age 81) Momignies, Belgium
- Party: National Front
- Other political affiliations: Jeune Europe; UDT

Daniel Féret (French pronunciation: [danjɛl feʁɛ]; born 7 August 1944) is a Belgian politician most noted as founder and long-term leader of the National Front. Féret worked as a physician.

In his youth Féret was a member of the far-right Jeune Europe and subsequently the populist Democratic Union of Labour. He was not a leading member in either group however and did not become well-known figure until later.

He established the National Front in 1985. He was elected a member of the European Parliament in 1994, holding the seat until 1999. His personal political philosophy was inspired almost wholly by that of the French National Front, which he sought to copy, although his own party attracted an eclectic membership of extremists, ranging from populists to neo-Nazis.

On 18 April 2006 he was sentenced to 250 hours of community service for the incitement to hatred, discrimination and segregation in the party's flyers and website. As a result of this case he was prohibited from standing for parliamentary elections for ten years.

He remained party leader from its foundation until 2008. He was eventually forced out by disgruntled party members who accused him variously of deliberately retarding the development of party organisation in order to ensure his personal control and of using the party as a personal source of wealth.
