= Alfred Vierling =

Dutch politician

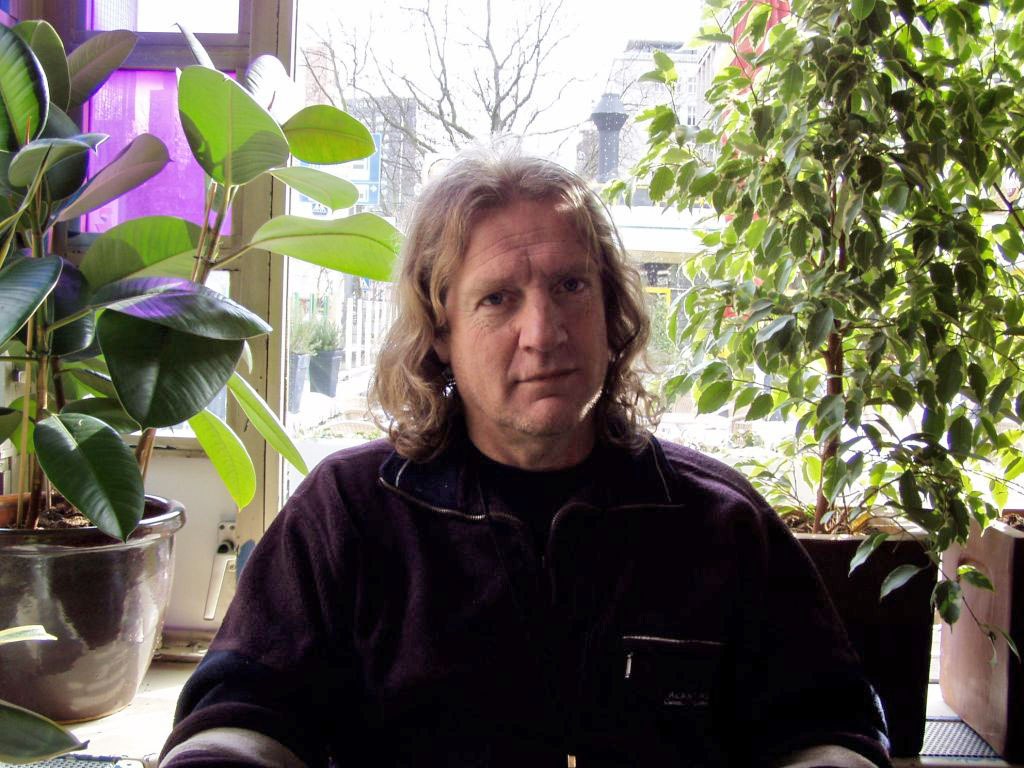
- Alfred Vierling in Rotterdam on 6 March 2005

Municipal Councillor in Schiedam
- In office 1 May 1990 – 10 October 1990

Personal details
- Born: 3 July 1949 (age 76) Voorburg, Netherlands
- Party: Centre Party, Centre Democrats, Dutch Block
- Education: Leiden University (drs.)
- Website: Official website

Alfred Vierling (/viːrlɪnŋ/; born 3 July 1949) is a Dutch politician and activist. In the 1980s he was active as a politician in the far-right Centre Party and Centre Democrats. In the 1990s he briefly served as a municipal councillor for the latter and was co-founder of the nationalist Dutch Block. In the 2000s and later he was an activist, writer and video maker and he was involved with and collaborated with groups and individuals, some of which were white nationalists.

== Politics ==
Vierling was active in the 1980s in the Dutch far-right nationalist Centre Party (for which he won 134,877 votes during the European elections in 1984) and Centre Democrats, for which he wrote a report on immigration and integration.

In 1990 Vierling was elected in the municipal council of Schiedam, he was a council member until October of that year. In 1992 he co-founded the Dutch Block.

Since then he is active for several "eurocentrist" (European identity advocating) groups, wrote articles for various magazines and websites and made a video interview series with far-right figures such as David Duke, Horst Mahler and Guillaume Faye.

Later Vierling had ties with white nationalist movements such as Voorpost and Erkenbrand.

== Other activities ==
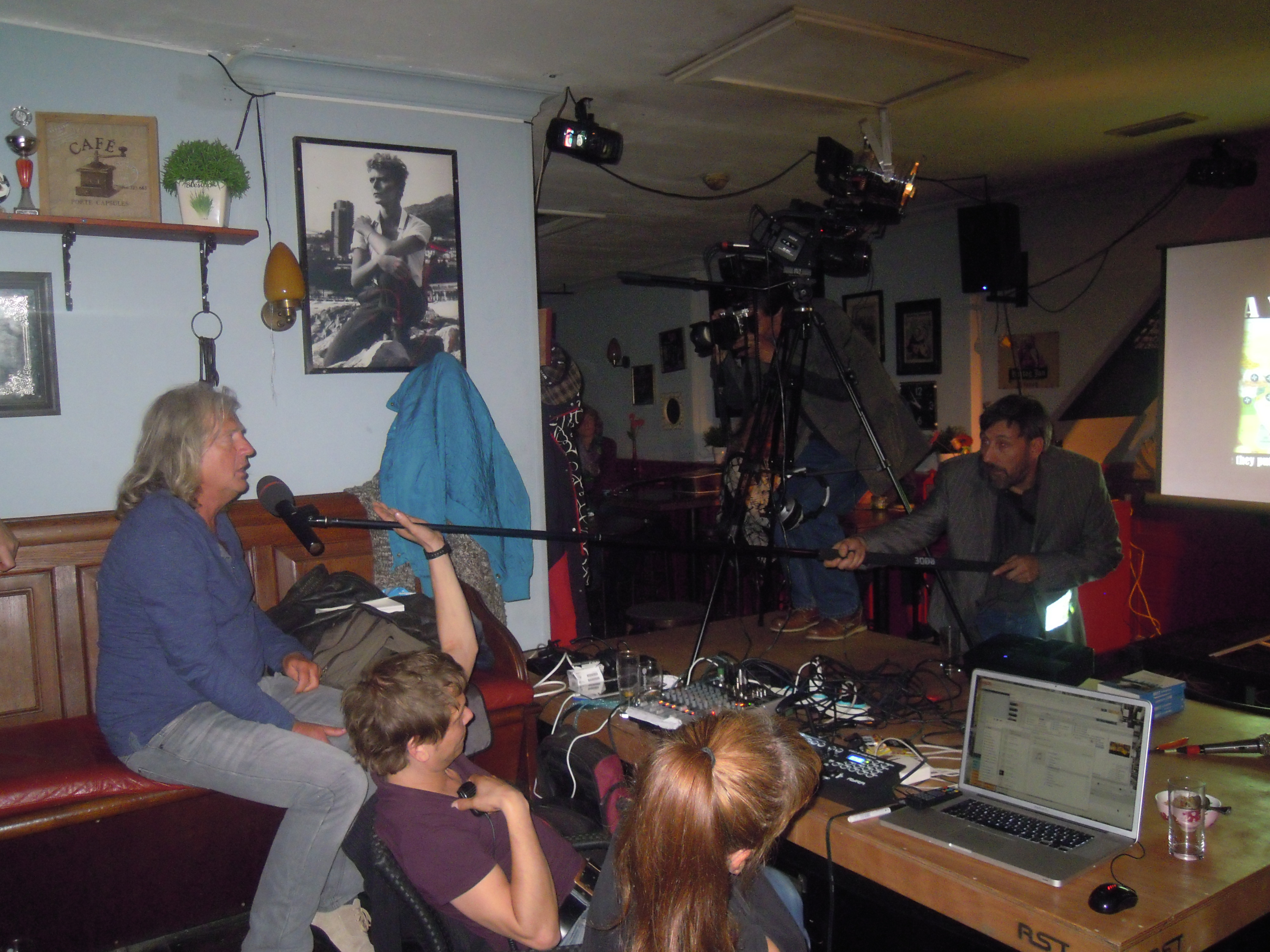
Vierling asks a question at a lecture in 2015

Vierling has long been an environmentalist as well as an animal protector. He was active in board of the Reinwater foundation (an activist group for protecting the river Rhine) until 11 July 1979, he was active as representative of Milieudefensie to the European Environmental Bureau in Brussels and he was president of the Ecological Movement in the Netherlands until 12 February 1983.

He has been scientific collaborator at Leiden University (International Environmental Law), the Free University of Amsterdam (Nuclear Strategies) and UNISA, University of Pretoria (Asian Studies). Also he has been Secretary of the Dutch Inter-Ministerial Commission for Migrants from Suriname and the Dutch Antilles before he became active in the anti-immigration Centre Party/Centre Democrats.

On 12 October 1999 Vierling submitted a complaint against three members of the Dutch government regarding war crimes committed by it within the framework of NATO bombings on Yugoslavia at the International Criminal Tribunal for the former Yugoslavia in The Hague. In the July–September 2010 issue n^{o} 4 of Ab Aeterno (Journal of the Academy of Social & Political Research) Vierling published an article about the Netherlands in world context entitled The Netherlands, a Failed State in a Failed Continent.

Vierling is openly gay and defends homosexuality.

== Gallery ==
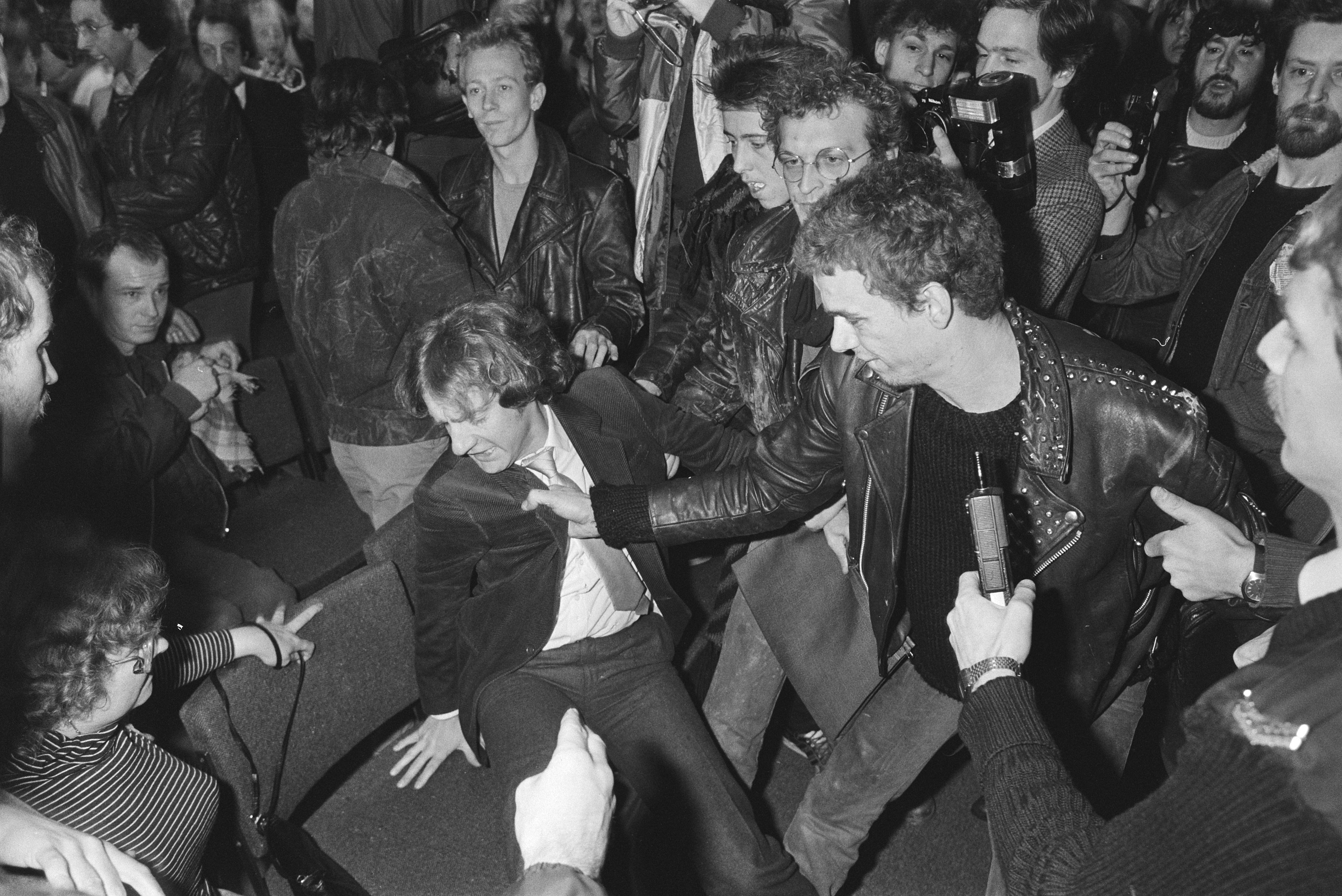
Vierling is removed from the Almere municipal council chambers during the installation of two Centre Party council members in 1984

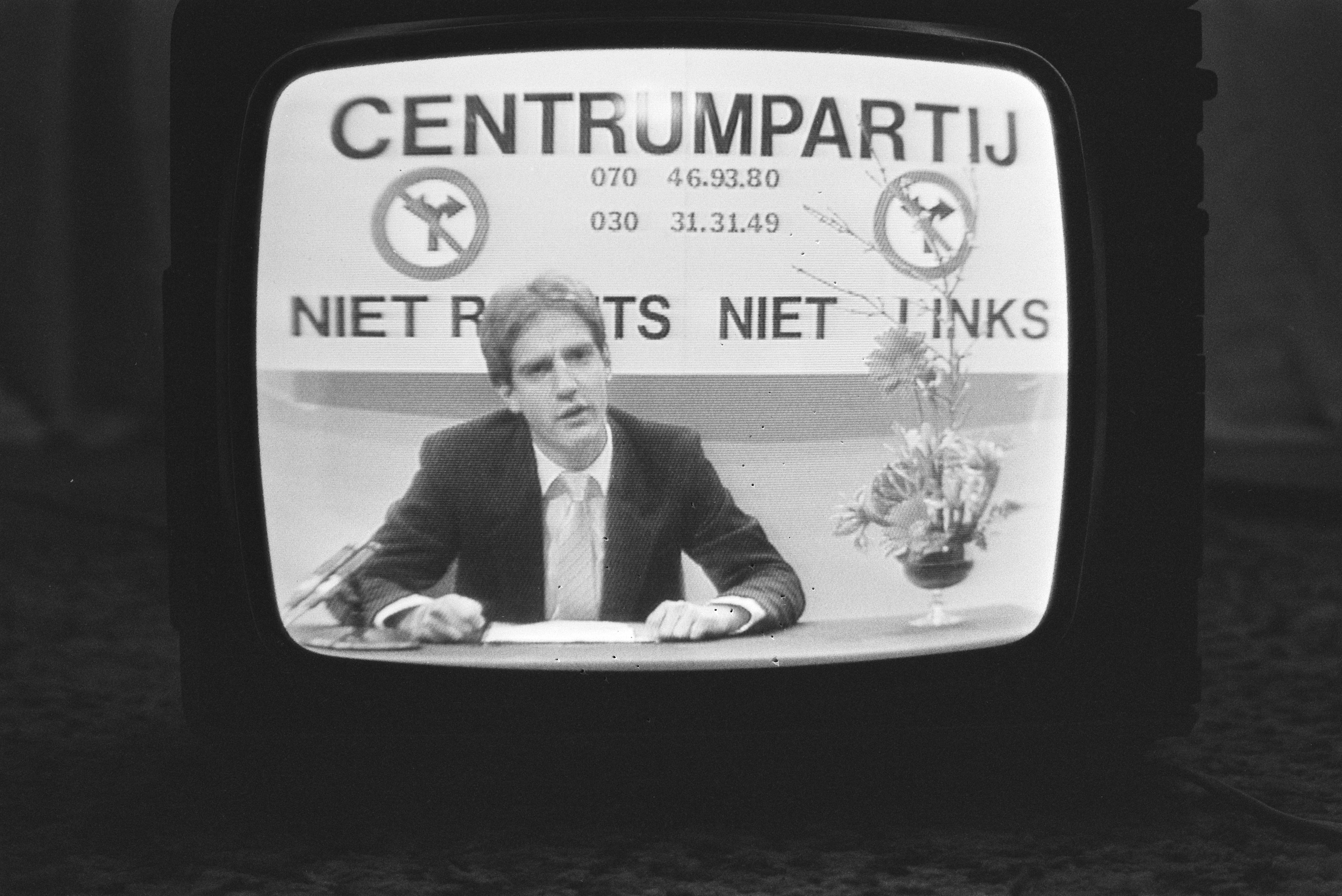
Alfred Vierling in a party political broadcast for the Centre Party in 1984

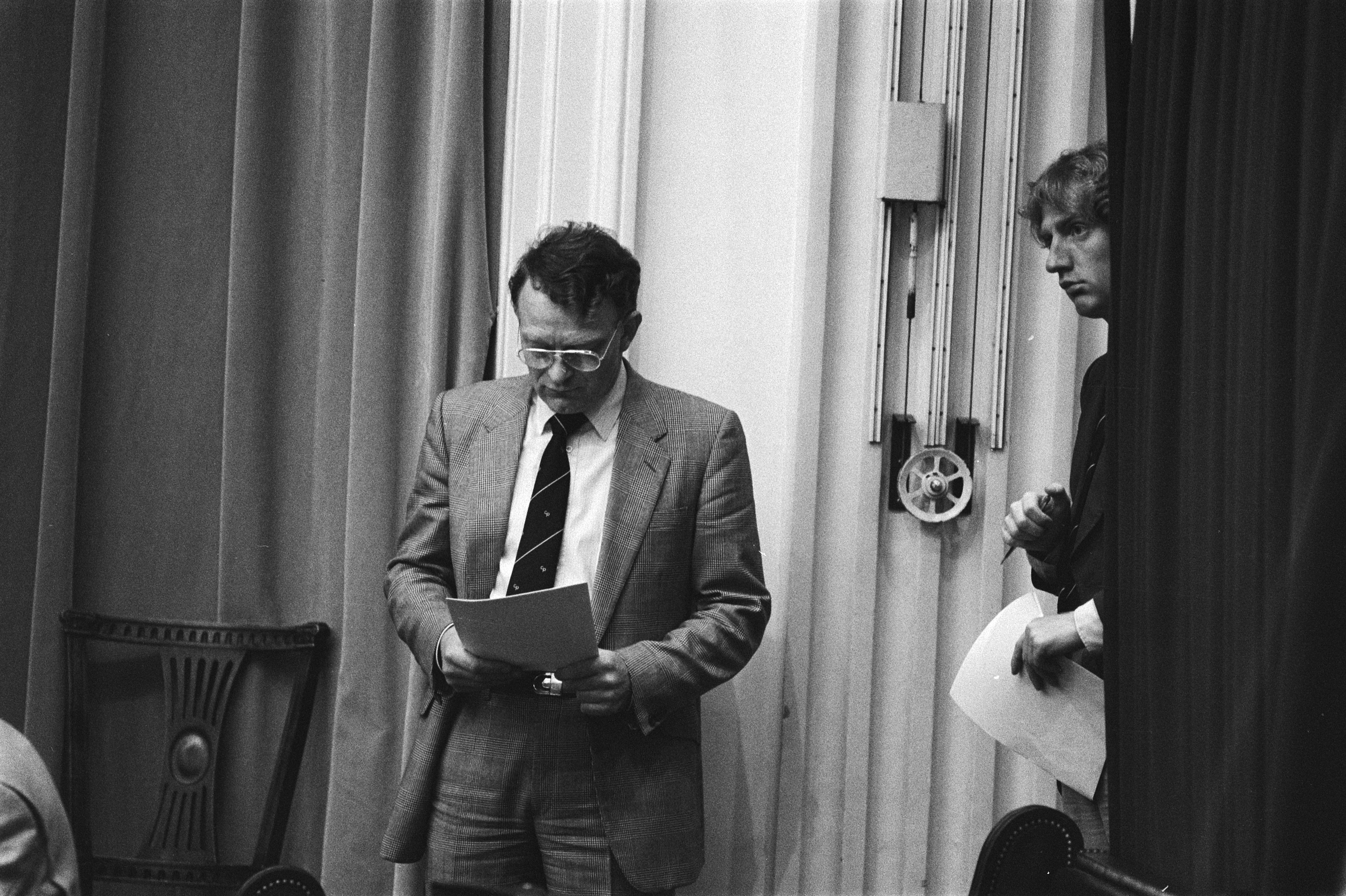
Vierling with Hans Janmaat, leader of the Centre Party, in 1984

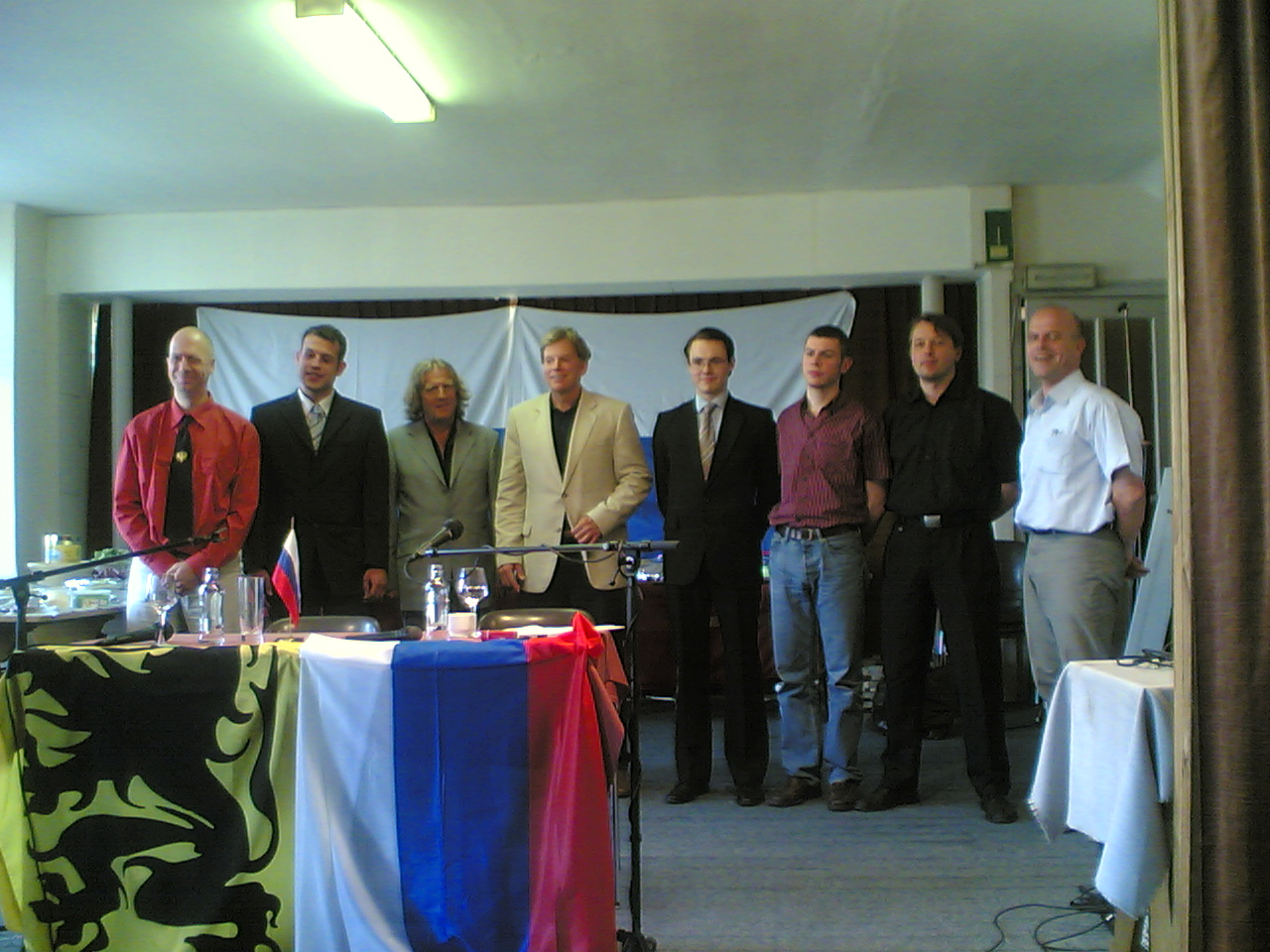
Vierling next to David Duke at Euro-Rus in Dendermonde, Belgium in 2008
