= 70-point plan (Belgium) =

The 70-point plan (Dutch: 70-puntenplan) was a proposal drafted in 1992 by the Belgian political party Vlaams Blok as an "answer to the problem of immigrants." The full title of the plan was "Immigration: the solutions. 70 proposals for the solution of the problem of aliens" (Immigratie: de oplossingen. 70 voorstellen ter oplossing van het vreemdelingenprobleem).

The first version of the 70 steps plan was presented on 6 June 1992, by Filip Dewinter during the colloquium "Immigration: the West has to choose." It wanted to prove that a policy of return of immigrants could be realised. The plan was inspired by Frenchman Jean-Marie Le Pen's "Fifty Measures to Help Manage the Problem of Immigrants."

The plan was heavily criticised because it was considered to be in breach of the European Convention on Human Rights (ECHR). In October 1996 the Vlaams Blok published a revision of the 70 steps plan, which according to the party was completely in line with the ECHR. The new plan softened the radical stance of the party by opening for the possibility of assimilation of non-European immigrants.

The Vlaams Blok discarded the 70 steps plan in 2000, although it did not make any proposals to specifically distance itself from the content of the plan.

The Belgian Centre for Equal Opportunities and Opposition to Racism, in retrospect, has called the 70 steps plan "a strategy of aggressive expulsion in order to create a mono-ethnic state."

Despite the cordon sanitaire excluding Vlaams Blok (and its successor Vlaams Belang) from participation in governments, critics of the party claim the 70-point plan has been influential on public discourse concerning immigration and multiculturalism in Belgium, and that many of its points are no longer taboo for mainstream parties with the subsequent adoption of certain policies by successive governments.
