= Rik Pinxten =

Belgian anthropologist

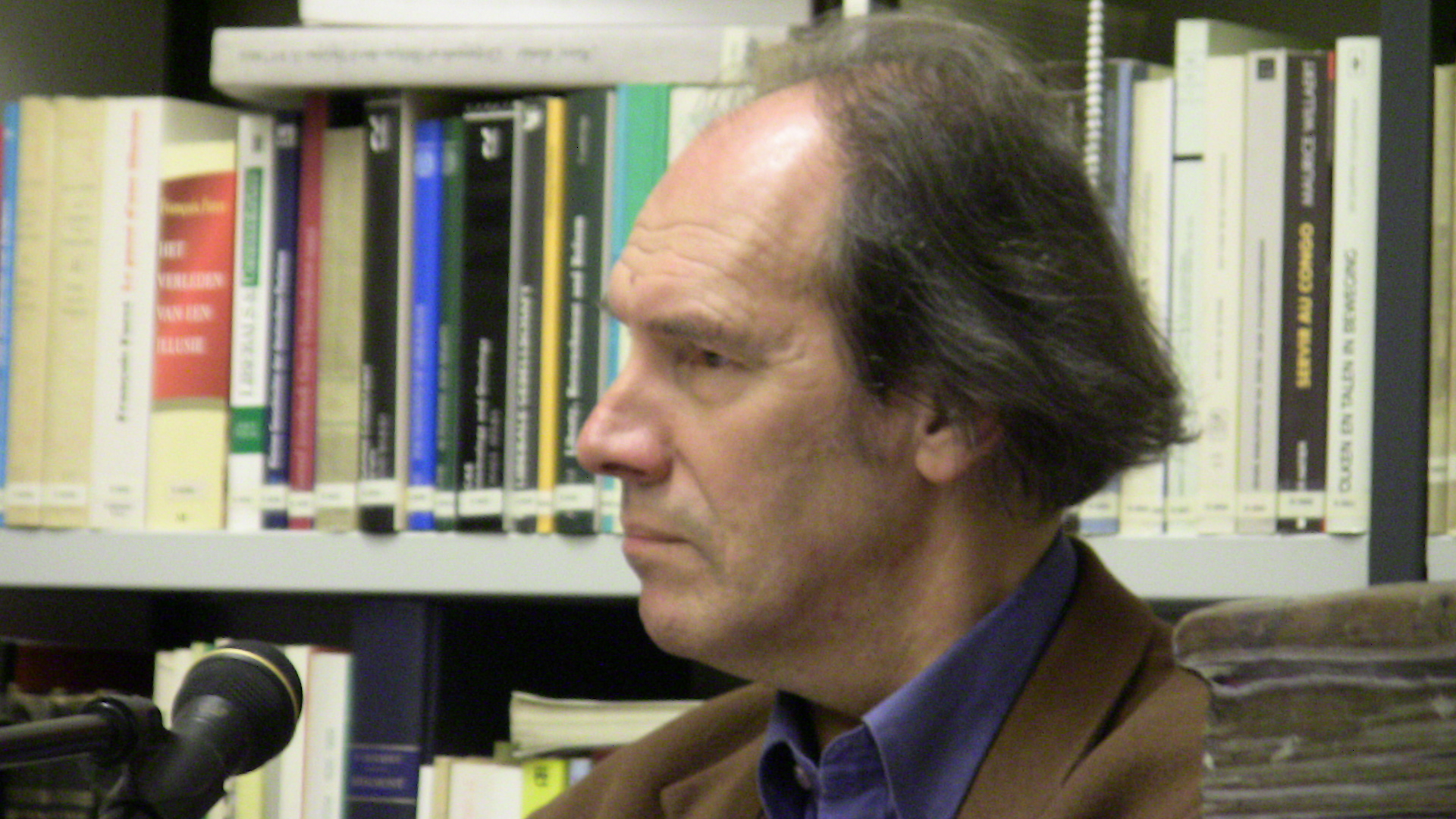
- Portrait of Pinxten during a debate at the Liberal Archive, 2008
- Born: Hendrik Pinxten; 1947 (age 78–79); Antwerp, Flanders, Belgium
- Occupation: Anthropologist
- Awards: Ark Prize of the Free Word

Academic background
- Education: Ethics
- Alma mater: Ghent University
- Doctoral advisor: Etienne Vermeersch

Academic work
- Discipline: Anthropology
- Sub-discipline: Cultural anthropology
- Website: Rik Pinxten publications on Academia.edu

Rik Pinxten (born 1947 in Antwerp) is a professor and researcher in cultural anthropology at Ghent University (UGent). Between 2003 and 2010 he was chairman of the Liberal Humanist Association of Flanders, the Flemish section of The Humanist Association (Belgium). He is chairman of the Center for Intercultural Communication and Interaction (CICI) of UGent. Together with Gerard Mortier, he was an advocate for the creation of the progressive Music Forum "The Krook" in Ghent. In 2004, he received the Ark Prize of the Free Word for his book The Artistic Society.

Pinxten conducted his fieldwork with the Navajo people. He is an advocate for interculturalism over multiculturalism, arguing for dialogue and interaction between different communities based on a strong identity.

== Bibliography ==
- 2009 DIY democracy, Ghislain Verstraete, eds, EPO, ISBN 978-90-6445-552-0
- 2009 People. An introduction to cultural anthropology, Lannoo, ISBN 978-90-209-8574-0
- 2007 The stripes of the zebra: a militant secular humanism, Houtekiet, ISBN 978-90-5240-965-8
- 2007 The great transition: conversations between a doctor and an anthropologist without believing God, Lannoo, ISBN 978-90-209-7304-4
- 2006 The Cultural century Houtekiet, ISBN 90-5240-887-4
- 2003 The artistic community: the influence of art on democracy, Houtekiet, ISBN 90-5240-723-1
- 2000 Divine fantasy about religion, learning and identity, Houtekiet, ISBN 90-5240-564-6
- 2006 Racism in Metropolitan Areas
- 1999 Cultures die slowly: on intercultural communication, Houtekiet, ISBN 90-5240-552-2
- 1998 Culture and power: on identity and conflict in a multicultural world - including Ed Rik Pinxten ... [Et al], Houtekiet, ISBN 90-5240-488-7
- 1997 Culture in Comparative Perspective - by Ed Rik Pinxten ... [Et al], Flemish Association for Cultural Studies, ISBN 90-289-2506-6
- 1993 Give to Caesar ... : About religion and politics - having edited by Pinxten, Rik, Kritak, ISBN 90-6303-462-8
- Initiations 1986, death - ed Pinxten, R., Communication and Cognition, ISBN 90-70963-14-0
