= National Democracy (Belgium) =

National Democracy Démocratie Nationale
- Leader: Daniel Féret (1985–2007); Michel Delacroix (2007–2008); Daniel Huygens (2008–2012); Marco Santi (since 2012)
- Founded: 1985
- Preceded by: Front National
- Headquarters: National Secretariat rue Tourette 100; Charleroi
- Ideology: Belgian nationalism; Anti-immigration
- Political position: Far-right
- European affiliation: Alliance of European National Movements

Website
- https://democratienationale.be

The National Democracy (French: Démocratie Nationale, pronounced [demɔkʁasi nɑsjɔnal]) is a francophone Belgian far-right political party. The party advocated a strong unitary Belgian nationalism, strongly opposed immigration, and reached out to Flemish voters.

The party's acting leader is Marco Santi.

In the 2003 federal election, it won one seat in the Chamber of Representatives, with 2% of the vote. It also had two seats in the Senate. A 2006 poll showed that it had the backing of about 9.4% of the Walloon voters. Despite this poll it won in the 10 June 2007 federal elections, 1 out of 150 seats in the Chamber of Representatives and 1 out of 40 seats in the Senate.

== Development ==
The DN was established by Daniel Féret, a former member of Jeune Europe who subsequently was active with the populist Union démocratique du travail. The party clashed with the Party of New Forces (PFN) from its foundation as Féret sought to distance his group from the far-right but despite his efforts a number of extremist activists soon joined the DN. The party's ideology soon became one of ultra-nationalism, xenophobia, racism and anti-Flemish sentiment, combined with a strong support for neo-liberal economics. They also look to their French namesake and followed many of their ideas, although the interest was not reciprocated as Jean-Marie Le Pen generally looked elsewhere in Belgium for allies, that is also the reason why the changed their name into National Democratie. In 1989 a number of PFN members switched to the FN due to internal difficulties in their party and as a result the FN again shifted policy, abandoning its earlier pro-NATO stance in favour opposition to both the USA and the Soviet Union.

After electing some local councillors in 1988 and 1989 the FN made a surprise breakthrough at the 1991 election by getting a member elected to parliament. The election caused a furore in Belgium and the other parties declared a Cordon sanitaire around the party. In response the FN adopted a more anti-establishment and anti-politics attitude, which struck a chord with some voters, resulting in the party sending a member to the European Parliament in 1994 and returning two members of parliament in 1995.

Despite these successes the DN was in a state of turmoil due to personality clashes and internal ideological differences, precipitating a long court case between two factions, both claiming use of the FN name. With most of their elected representatives leaving the party, the FN appeared moribund until in 1997 Agir, a far-right party with support in Liège, merged into them following internal difficulties of their own. With the influx of new members they were able to regroup for the 1999 elections, gaining a new member of the Senate and three members of the regional parliament.

== Brussels Appeals Court conviction ==
The party's original leader, Daniel Féret, was sentenced to 250 hours of community service on April 18, 2006, for the incitement of hatred, discrimination and segregation in the party's flyers and website. He is also barred from running for political office for 10 years. The webmaster of the National Front site was also convicted, and barred for 7 years. Their convictions were upheld by a superior court in October 2006.

== 2006 elections ==
In Wallonia, members of the National Front could not run using the party name during the 2006 municipal elections, because the party failed to use the correct electoral procedure. In Brussels, the National Front ran under its acronym: FN.

== Election results (1985–2010) ==
Belgian Chamber of Representatives
Election year	# of total votes	% of overall vote	# of seats won
1985	3,738	0.1%	0
1987	7,596	0.1%	0
1991	64,992	1.1%	1
1995	138,496	2.3%	2
1999	90,401	1.5%	1
2003	130,012	1.98%	1
2007	131,385	1.97%	1
2010	33,591	0.51%	0

Belgian Senate
Election year	# of votes	% of vote	# of seats won
1985	4,201	0.1%	0
1987	8,186	0.6%	0
1987	60,876	1.0%	0
1995	–	–	–
1999	92,924	1.5%	0
2003	147,305	2.25%	1
2007	150,461	2.27%	1
2010	–	–	–

European Parliament
Election year	# of votes	% of vote	# of seats won
1994	175,732	2.9%	1
1999	94,848	1.52%	0
2004	181,351	2.79%	0
