= Party of New Forces (Belgium) =

Belgian political party

Party of New Forces (French: Parti des forces nouvelles, pronounced [paʁti de fɔʁs nuvɛl], PFN) was a Belgian far-right political party active in Wallonia. Although they share a name it is not directly connected to the Party of New Forces in France.

== Emergence ==
The PFN first emerged in 1975 under the name Forces Nouvelles, initially operating as a coalition of like-minded extremists rather than a political party. Early members of the group had come from the Front de la Jeunesse. Its early years were dominated by internal struggles, resulting in the group doing little publicly between 1975 and 1980 due to this strife.

In 1979 the group was instrumental in the formation of Eurodroite, an alliance of European far-right political parties that also included the Italian Social Movement (MSI), the French PFN and Fuerza Nueva amongst others.

== Ideology ==
Ideologically the party tended towards the neo-fascist or neo-Nazi end of the far-right and sought early contact with the MSI. It celebrated the heritage of Rexism and shared with it contempt for parliamentary democracy and support for corporatism in economics. The group also adopted a strongly anti-American strain to its discourse. Whilst anti-immigration has been at the centre of its appeal the PFN has also focused on anti-Semitism and has been active in promoting Holocaust denial. Its anti-immigrant rhetoric frequent included calls to biological racism. Repatriation of immigrants was a central part of their position. The group has also campaigned vigorously against abortion.

== Elections ==
The group contested the 1989 regional elections but failed to attract much support, capturing only 1.1% of the vote in Brussels. The PFN spent much of the 1980s competing with the Front National for votes and tended to come off worse. Thus in Brussels in 1985 the PFN won 0.7% of the vote to the FN's 0.5% (the FN having been formed only that year) but by the 1988 municipal elections this had shifted to 0.5% for the FN to 0.9% for the FN whilst by 1991 the FN had won seats in the Chamber of Representatives. Nonetheless, it did manage to gain pockets of local support, with its vote rising as high as 15% in some districts.

== Decline ==
The PFN supported the use of publicity stunts in order to raise its profile and took a stand at the Brussels International Book Fair where its stock of Holocaust denial material attracted police attention. A scuffle broke out when the police attempted to remove the stall, with the incident widely covered in the Belgian press. The incident however exacerbated internal divisions and in 1989 Willy Freson and the Liège group of the PFN split to form their own movement, Agir. Robert Destrouder, a member of the PFN secretariat, also switched over to this new group.

After 1989 the PFN continued to decline, with many party members switching allegiance to the FN thereafter. Having been seriously weakened by these splits and having failed to make any headway in the elections it contested the PFN formally dissolved in 1991. Following its disappearance some members joined the Walloon Regional Front, a short-lived group that was itself absorbed by the FN in 1993 whilst others went into a new group, Renouveau Nationaliste (formed in 1993), a group closely associated with the French and European Nationalist Party.
