= Proximus Skynet =

Belgacom Skynet
- Company type: Interactive digital media company
- Industry: Media
- Founded: 1995
- Defunct: 2019
- Headquarters: Brussels, Belgium
- Key people: Jean-Charles De Keyser, CEO of Belgacom Skynet
- Products: Online and TV media
- Website: skynet.be

Proximus Skynet (earlier Belgacom Skynet) was a Belgian interactive digital media company. It was founded in 1995, and became a wholly owned subsidiary of Belgacom in 1998. It began by focusing on the consumer market, gradually expanding its customer base to include SMEs and corporate customers. In 2000, Skynet.be became one of the first Belgian portals. The Skynet brand was decommissioned in favour of Proximus Pickx in 2019.

== History ==
- 1995: Skynet is founded. Its name is a reference to the evil mainframe computer from Terminator Franchise.
- 1998: Acquisition of Skynet by Belgacom NV/SA.
- 2002: Acquisition of The Push and Eduline (Kidcity).
- 2003: Acquisition of Justforyou.
- 2004: Birth of ADSL.be and Arena51. ADSL.be provides interactive content and services to ADSL customers, while Arena51 aims to become the number one games and entertainment portal in Belgium.
- 2005: Belgacom Skynet creates a wholly owned subsidiary, Skynet iMotion Activities, to ensure the audiovisual production and diffusion of Belgacom TV. Skynet also acquires all rights for the Jupiler League (the Belgian premium league).
- 2006: Skynet acquires Extenseo, a Belgian professional referencing company.
- 2019: Skynet was decommissioned in favour of Proximus Pickx.

== Activities ==
Skynet's activities revolved around two main strategic areas:

=== Media intended for the consumer market ===
Skynet offered solutions via a cross-platform digital offer (Web, Direct Media, IDTV). This offer consisted of:

==== via the Web ====
- Skynet.be: the main Skynet portal
- KidCity.be: the children's portal
- Arena51.be: the games and entertainment portal
- 11online.be: the football portal
- ADSL.be: the portal reserved for Belgacom ADSL customers

==== via Direct Media ====
- JustForYou
- BusinessForYou
- CarsForYou

==== via IDTV ====
- 11: the Belgian football channel on Belgacom TV.

=== Marketing, media and advertising solutions ===
These solutions were designed to meet the interactive marketing needs of companies on all platforms (Web, Direct Media, IDTV). They mainly consisted of direct and loyalty marketing, search engine marketing, media productions, and mobile solutions.
