= Anti-fascist research group Kafka =

Dutch far-left research group

Kafka
- Anti-fascist research group Kafka
- Antifascistische Onderzoeksgroep Kafka
- Named after: Franz Kafka
- Location: Holland
- Spokesperson: Jaap van Beek
- Website: kafka.nl

Anti-fascist research group Kafka, commonly abbreviated to Kafka, is a Dutch anti-fascist and far-left research group. Its name was said to be an acronym for Kollektief Anti-Fascistisch/-Kapitalistisch Archief (English: Collective Anti-Fascist/-Capitalist Archive) before 1994, but the research group has since indicated that they had named themselves after the writer Franz Kafka.

== History ==
Kafka finds its origins in the squatters' movement. It conducts research into groups and individuals in the Netherlands whom it considers to be far-right, and the developments related to them. The results are published on the website of the research group. Kafka is funded by gifts and donations, rather than subsidies. Jaap van Beek has been the group's spokesperson since at least 2010.

In the run-up to the provincial elections of 2011, Kafka published a report which showed that various Party for Freedom (Partij voor de Vrijheid, PVV) candidate members and party supporters (who had signed its "Declaration of support for a list of candidates" document) had ties to the far-right. Among them were former Centre Democrats and members or candidate members of the Dutch People's Union.

In December 2017, the research group published a report on Géza Hegedüs, who had been presented as PVV's lead candidate in Rotterdam for the 2018 municipal elections. Kafka revealed that Hegedüs was a member of the alt-right Studiegenootschap Erkenbrand and had shared, among other things, antisemitic and antiziganist opinions and his belief in a coming civil war in Western Europe on that group's podcast.

In 2023, two White Lives Matter (WLM) activists were arrested on suspicion of projecting white nationalist slogans on the Erasmusbrug in Rotterdam and other structures in Alkmaar and Eindhoven. Dutch media cited Kafka's report on WLM in their coverage, and the group's spokesperson voiced his concerns about right-wing extremists' attempts to normalize racism and the increased use of ethnonationalist rhetoric in mainstream political discourse.

== Government scrutiny ==
In the 2008 annual threat report of the General Intelligence and Security Service (Dutch: Algemene Inlichtingen- en Veiligheidsdienst, AIVD), under the heading 'left-wing extremism', Kafka was mentioned as the information supplier of the left-wing activist group Anti-Fascistische Aktie (AFA). In 2010, the AIVD wrote in its report Afkalvend front, blijvend beladen (English: Calving Front, Permanently Fraught) that Kafka and AFA strove to "keep everything that is considered right-wing out of the public space." Kafka and AFA would allegedly pursue this anti-democratic goal through undemocratic means, such as (inciting) violence and intimidation.

On 18 September 2025, the House of Representatives adopted a motion by the PVV and Forum for Democracy to designate "Antifa" as a terrorist organization.

== See also ==
- Antifa (Netherlands)
- Blokwatch, a comparable research and documentation group on right-wing extremism in Belgium
