= Egmont pact =

The Egmont pact (Dutch: Egmontpact; French: Pacte d'Egmont; German: Egmont-Pakt) of 1977 is an agreement on the reform of Belgium into a federal state and on the relations between the linguistic communities in the country. The pact was not carried out due to the resignation of the government, but important elements of the pact were used in later Belgian state reforms.

The pact was agreed upon on May 24, 1977, between the majority parties of the government Tindemans IV, which was a coalition between CVP, PSC, BSP-PSB, Volksunie and FDF. It was named after the Egmont Palace in Brussels, where the negotiations took place.

The pact was supplemented with the "Stuyvenberg agreement" later the same year. Both would be called the "Community pact".

== Content ==
The Egmont pact covered agreements on a number of various topics:

- The establishment of autonomous councils and executives (a government) for the three communities in Belgium (which followed the establishment of the three Cultural Communities in 1970 - Dutch, French and German), next to the establishment of three Regions (Flanders, Brussels and Wallonia), also with autonomous councils and their own executives.
- An agreement on the linguistic relations in Brussels and its periphery, with the inscription right in Brussels for French speakers from 14 Dutch-speaking municipalities around Brussels. This would give them language facilities and the right to vote in Brussels.
- A reform of the country's institutions.

== Failure ==
The agreement was not put into practice as there was an immediate protest from the Flemish side. Especially the points on Brussels, with the end of institutional equality between French and Dutch speakers, were unacceptable for a lot of Flemings.

The advice on the law that would have put the Egmont pact in practice was, on a number of points, heavily criticised by the Council of State. Resistance against the pact rose within the CVP, and more and more MPs demanded new negotiations. These were refused by the French-speaking parties. The CVP remained divided. On October 11, 1978, in an emotional speech, PM Leo Tindemans unexpectedly announced the resignation of his government.

== Consequences ==
The Egmont crisis had consequences for some Belgian parties. The radical right wing from the Volksunie separated itself, leading to the creation of the far right Vlaams Blok political party. One of the last unitary parties in Belgium, the socialist BSP-PSB, was split into a French-speaking and a Dutch-speaking party. The last remaining unitary party being until today the PVDA-PTB.

Although the Egmont pact itself failed, it was an important exercise towards the federalisation of Belgium given that much of its proposals have ended up being carried out (see Communities, regions and provinces of Belgium). Various points of the pact were realised much later on (in separate independent rounds of negotiations), such as the division of the electoral district Brussels-Halle-Vilvoorde and to some extent the rights for French speakers in the Flemish regeon's Brussels Periphery.

== See also ==
- State reform in Belgium
