= Human Rights League (Belgium) =

The Human Rights League (French: Ligue des Droits de l'homme; Dutch: Liga voor de Rechten van de Mens) was founded in Belgium on 8 May 1901, after the in 1898 established Ligue des Droits de l'Homme in France. The Belgian initiative came from Eugène Monseur, a professor at the Université libre de Bruxelles.

In the First World War, the organisation was dissolved. It reappeared several years after the war, as the Ligue Belge pour la Défense des Droits de l’Homme et du Citoyen, or Belgian League for the Defense of Human and Civil Rights. In the 1930s, its president Emile Vandervelde emphasized on concerting with both the International Federation for Human Rights (FIDH) at Paris and the government at Brussels.

The Nazi-German invaders put a halt to the organization's activities and ceased its archives in 1940. The German Occupation and the following repression claimed their toll in absence of a Belgian human rights organisation. Not until 1954, the appearance of the Ligue Belge pour la Défense des Droits de l’Homme (LBDH), or Belgian League for the Defense of Human Rights, demonstrated emphasis on independence from government so as to allow protecting human rights of each and all individuals from totalitarianism or society's contemporary whims.

In 1968 the Belgian League for the Defence of Human Rights officially became an 'Institution of Public Interest' by the names Ligue Belge pour la Défense des Droits de l’Homme and Belgische Liga voor de Verdediging van de Rechten van de Mens.

In 1978 as a practical internal reorganisation of the 'Institution', and since 1982 also officially, the national organisation was split into the Dutch-speaking Liga voor Mensenrechten and the French-speaking Ligue des droits de l'homme.

- The Dutch name still registered with the International Federation of Human Rights Leagues, shows an obsolete spelling and is no longer used: Liga voor Menschenrechten. This FIDH does however show the correct Dutch name in the contact information.
- The French name is identical to the one for the similar organisation in France, see Human Rights League (France). The International Federation of Human Rights Leagues (FIDH) shows LDH and LDHB as abbreviation for the French-speaking organisation in Belgium, which since 1992 is also associated with the European League for Human Rights, abbreviated AEDH from its French name Association Européenne pour la défense des Droits de l'Homme. The latter's web site however, shows LDH as abbreviation for both organisations.
