= Centre for Equal Opportunities and Opposition to Racism =

Belgian public institution

Unia, or the Interfederal Center for Equal Opportunities (Dutch: Interfederaal Gelijkekansencentrum) and the Centre for Equal Opportunities and Opposition to Racism (French: Centre pour l'égalité des chances et la lutte contre le racisme) is an independent public institution that fights discrimination and promotes equal opportunities in Belgium.

== History ==
The Centre was founded in 1993 by an Act of the Belgian Chamber of People's Representatives.

In 2003, the competencies of the Centre have been further expanded to include 'non-racial' forms of discrimination. The Centre has also been given the authority to intervene on the grounds of the law against negationism.

In 2011, the Centre received the mandate of independent mechanism responsible for the promotion, protection and monitoring of the implementation of the United Nations Convention on the Rights of Persons with Disabilities.

In 2013, the federal government, the regions and communities signed a partnership agreement officially making the former Centre - now Unia - an interfederal institution for combating discrimination. The responsibilities regarding migration, the fundamental rights of foreigners and their humane treatment were assigned to a separate federal structure: the Federal Migration Centre, that was renamed Myria.

In 2018, Unia was recently recognized as a national institution for the protection of human rights, B status, by the competent international bodies.

== Tasks and goals ==
The legal responsibilities of Unia cover two key elements:

- Combating discrimination and encouraging equal opportunities based on 'protected criteria': presumed race, skin colour, nationality, ancestry (Jewish origin), national or ethnic origin, disability, philosophical or religious beliefs, sexual orientation, age, wealth (in other words, financial resources), civil status, political beliefs, trade union membership, state of health, physical of genetic characteristics, birth, social background and family composition.
- Promoting, protecting and monitoring of the implementation of the United Nations Convention on the Rights of Persons with Disabilities in Belgium.

Unia has four ways of achieving this goal:

- Assisting discrimination victims. This can be done by giving (legal) advice or support, mediation or going to court.
- Creating awareness among the public opinion for discrimination issues, by training, education, documentation and public relations.
- Working with authorities and different actors in society on preventive anti-discrimination and integration policies.
- Recommendations to policy makers on the different issues it addresses.

Unia is not competent for:

- gender: Belgium has a specific body that deals with issues of equality between women and men and gender-based discrimination (including transgender people): Institute for the Equality of Women and Men.
- language: no public body has a specific competence in this field.

== Management ==
=== Directors ===
On 1 February 2016 Els Keytsman and Patrick Charlier were appointed co-managers of Unia. Currently, Els Keytsman De Ronne and Patrick Charlier are directors of Unia.

=== Board of directors ===
Unia's board of directors is made up of 20 members plus a representative from the German-speaking Community (for matters relevant to that community). Members are appointed on the basis of their expertise, experience, independence and moral authority and are drawn from the academic world, law, civil society, social partners, etc.

Shaireen Aftab et David Quinaux were elected chairpersons of the Board of Directors on 20 May 2021.

== See also ==
- National human rights institution
