= Vlaams Blok =

Former Flemish far-right party

Flemish Bloc Vlaams Blok
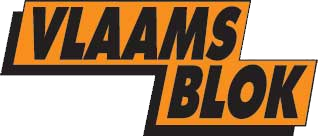
- Leader: Frank Vanhecke
- Founded: 1978 (as coalition)
- Registered: 28 May 1979 (as party)
- Dissolved: 14 November 2004
- Split from: Volksunie
- Succeeded by: Vlaams Belang
- Youth wing: Vlaams Blok Jongeren
- Membership: 18,000 (2004)
- Ideology: Flemish nationalism; Anti-immigration; National conservatism; Right-wing populism
- Political position: Far-right
- European Parliament group: European Right (1989–94); Technical Group of Independents (1999–2001); Non-Inscrits (2001–2004)
- Colours: Orange, Black

Party flag
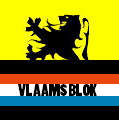

Website
- www.vlaamsblok.be
- Politics of Belgium; Political parties; Elections; *Formerly European Right (1989–94) and Technical Group of Independents (1999–2001).

Vlaams Blok (Dutch pronunciation: [ˈvlaːmz ˈblɔk], VB; English: Flemish Bloc) was a Belgian far-right and secessionist political party with an anti-immigration platform, rebranded later as Vlaams Belang. Its ideologies embraced Flemish nationalism, calling for the independence of Flanders.

The party originated from split within the Volksunie (VU) party after the right-wing separatist and national conservative wing became disgruntled with the compromise of accepting Belgian federalism over Flemish interests, and what they saw as the VU's move to the left. The former VU members created the Flemish National Party (VNP) and the Flemish People's Party (VVP) which formed an electoral alliance called Vlaams Blok in 1978, before merging to create Vlaams Blok as a political party in 1979. Vlaams Blok was the most notable militant right wing of the Flemish movement and its track record in the Flemish and Belgian parliament elections was strong, making it one of the most successful nationalist parties in Western Europe and it ultimately surpassed the People's Union in support. The party initially focused solely on the issues of Flemish autonomy and political freedom, which remained its core philosophy, but subsequently gained wider public support through broadening its campaigns to include immigration and law-and-order themes.

All significant Flemish political parties were reluctant to enter coalitions with the Vlaams Blok. Following a 1989 agreement, known as the cordon sanitaire, the party was effectively blocked from entering any level of government. The court of appeal in Ghent in April 2004 ruled that some of the party's organizations had breached the 1981 anti-racism law and that the party sanctioned discrimination. The ruling was made definite on 9 November 2004, and the party shortly after reorganised itself as the Vlaams Belang. By 2004, the party had arguably become the single most popular Flemish party in Belgium, supported by about one in four of the Flemish electorate, as well as being one of the most successful radical right-wing populist parties in Europe as a whole.

== History ==
=== Background, Flemish Movement ===
The unofficial version of the Flag of Flanders associated with the Flemish Movement (not strictly the Vlaams Blok).

The Vlaams Blok originated from the loose Flemish Movement, which historically has included an array of organisations seeking, to varying degrees, to promote Flanders. In the second half of the nineteenth century, Flemish nationalists operated within the established political parties, and had close ties with the political left. The early organised political expression of Flemish nationalism was triggered by World War I, and the introduction of universal suffrage and proportional representation in elections. The main party that initially represented the movement was the left-wing nationalist Front Party, founded by former soldiers and sympathizers from the trench wars in Flanders Fields disaffected with their French-speaking, often anti-Flemish, officers that had been unable to communicate with their troops. From the 1930s, the main party became the Flemish National Union which turned to collaborate with the Nazis during World War II, as they had promised them increased Flemish autonomy. These circumstances would compromise the re-emergence of Flemish nationalism after the war, although only a faction of the broader movement had actually pursued an agenda of collaboration.

The direct predecessor to the Vlaams Blok was the big tent People's Union, which was founded in 1954 as the successor to the Christian Flemish People's Union electoral alliance, that had successfully run for election earlier the same year. The party had been careful to choose its leaders from nationalist circles that had not collaborated with the Nazis. The People's Union had successfully united various strands of Flemish nationalists into a coherent movement from federalists to separatists, however some Flemish separatists had been suspicious of the People's Union since its outset, and it became clear by the 1970s that the party had moved to a moderate left-liberal course, which led to the defection of its more radical members. The remaining nationalist hardliners finally rejected the party's participation in a new five-party government coalition in 1977, and particularly the Egmont pact, believing it had conceded too much to the francophone government parties.

=== Early years (1978–1988) ===
In late 1977, the rejection of the Egmont pact by the hardliner faction of the People's Union led to the establishment of two new (short-lived) parties; the radical nationalist Flemish National Party (VNP) and the national liberal Flemish People's Party (VVP), respectively led by Karel Dillen and Lode Claes. The parties contested the 1978 general elections in a coalition called "Vlaams Blok", where they won 1.4% of the vote and one seat in the Chamber of Representatives (taken by Dillen). On 28 May 1979, the VNP and VVP finally merged to form a new party named Vlaams Blok, and Dillen was nominated to be the party's leader for life. The party initially recruited its members from Flemish nationalist organisations, such as the Taal Aktie Komitee, Voorpost, Were Di, and the Order of Flemish Militants, while some local groups also simply turned into local branches of the Vlaams Blok. Since its inception, the party was widely regarded as an extreme right-wing and racist group.

The party did not have much electoral success at first, and was stable at one seat in the 1981 general elections. It stood candidates in very few communities, and was active almost entirely in the city of Antwerp. Having been founded mainly as a protest against the Egmont pact, the party revamped and broadened its platform after the pact collapsed. It did not make much progress in the 1985 general elections, and Dillen thus started the so-called "Operation Rejuvenation", allowing for an across-the-board change of the party leadership, integrating many leaders of nationalist youth and student organisations into the party council. The party's youth organisation, the Vlaams Blok Jongeren (VBJ), was founded in 1987 by among others Filip Dewinter and Frank Vanhecke.

Starting in 1983, the Vlaams Blok increasingly began focusing on immigration (inspired by the success of other European right-wing populist parties), and on the international day against racism in 1984 held its first conference to discuss the "foreigner problem." Towards the late 1980s, the party also became one of the first in Europe to flirt with an anti-Islam agenda (warning about what it called the "Islamization of Europe") and address the issue of immigrants from majority Muslim societies, in particular Turkish and Moroccan migrant communities in Belgium. Vlaams Blok claimed that such communities were a threat to Flemish ethnic and cultural identity and were linked to crime. The same year, Dillen proposed a bill in the Chamber of Representatives to offer cash incentive for immigrants to return to their native country. In April 1987, a group around Roger Frankinouille of the only right-wing competitor to the Vlaams Blok, the anti-tax Respect for Labour and Democracy, switched to the party. The party campaigned for the 1987 general election with the slogan "Own people first" (Eigen volk eerst!, inspired by French National Front slogan "The French first"), and saw a slight victory, winning their first seat in Senate (taken by Dillen), and for the first time two seats in the Chamber (Dewinter and Annemans). The party's shift towards focusing on immigration was however criticised by some Vlaams Blok members, and ultimately also led to the defection of some top party figures. The party nevertheless made a clear choice of focussing on the immigration issue, which had, and would, give results in elections.

=== Rise of the party (1988–2004) ===
The electoral success of the Vlaams Blok began after the younger generation in the party shifted the party's emphasis from Flemish nationalism (separatism) to the immigration issue. In the 1988 local election in Antwerp the party first started to take off, going from 5.5% of the vote in the city to 17.7%, a success which drew much publicity. On 10 May 1989, based on the Antwerp success, the presidents of all major Belgian parties (including the People's Union) signed a cordon sanitaire (hygienic barrier), where the parties agreed to never conclude any political agreements with the Vlaams Blok, nor make immigration a political issue. While the Vlaams Blok itself also largely rejected cooperation with other parties, it did increasingly consider such cooperation, particularly in elections in 1994, 1999 and 2000, only to find themselves effectively blocked by the cordon sanitaire. Although intended to keep the Vlaams Blok from gaining political influence, many argued that the cordon sanitaire in reality helped the strong electoral surge for the party, as it was made into what could be seen as the only "true opposition," and the party was able to bolster its claims that the Belgian political establishment sought to suppress calls for more Flemish autonomy and deny the Flemish voters a voice in national affairs. The agreement was renewed in following years, and Vlaams Blok chairman Karel Dillen was used to call it the "insurance policy" of his party;

"I was basically very happy with its existence. There was something a bit too much about it: everybody against us. If the sense is that there is a hunt out for us, then this will only drive people to take the side of the outlaw."

In December 1988, a major split occurred in the party, when a group who opposed the "Operation Rejuvenation" tried to squeeze the Dewinter-VBJ faction out of the party leadership. Led by Geert Wouters, he accused Dewinter's faction of being "Lepenists", and of attempting to sideline the Flemish question to rather favour the immigration question. Dillen however sided with Dewinter, and Wouters and his group left the party and founded the nationalist pressure group called the Nationalist Association-Dutch People's Movement. In 1989, the party won a seat in the Brussels city council, as well as in the European Parliament. There, the Vlaams Blok agreed to form a parliamentary group together with the French National Front and the German The Republicans, called the Technical Group of the European Right. The group lacked an ideological coherence (stemming in part from Le Pen's support for a Belgian state nationalism), and was largely organised on pragmatic grounds simply to get financial support.

In the 1991 general election, the Vlaams Blok for the first time surpassed the People's Union, going from two to 12 seats in the Chamber, and from one to five seats in the Senate, in what was afterwards referred to by its opponents as "Black Sunday". In the following years, the party saw a systematic upwards trend in all elections it participated in. In July 1992, the first Vlaams Blok motion was accepted in the Flemish Parliament, which rejected the right of francophone inhabitants in Flemish Brabant and Voeren to vote for Wallon institutions. In late 1992, it was announced that Staf Neel, a popular Antwerp city councillor for 22 years for the Socialist Party went over to the Vlaams Blok, thereby causing the SP and CVP to lose their majority in the city council. In 1992, the party ideologue Filip Dewinter and chairman Karel Dillen established the party's comprehensive immigration program, titled the 70-point plan. The plan sought to close the borders towards non-European immigrants, gradually repatriate those already in the country, and implement an "own people first" principle in all policy areas. Over the course of the 1990s, the party however increasingly distanced itself from the plan as it had alienated the party from gaining political influence, until it was finally officially discarded in 2000.

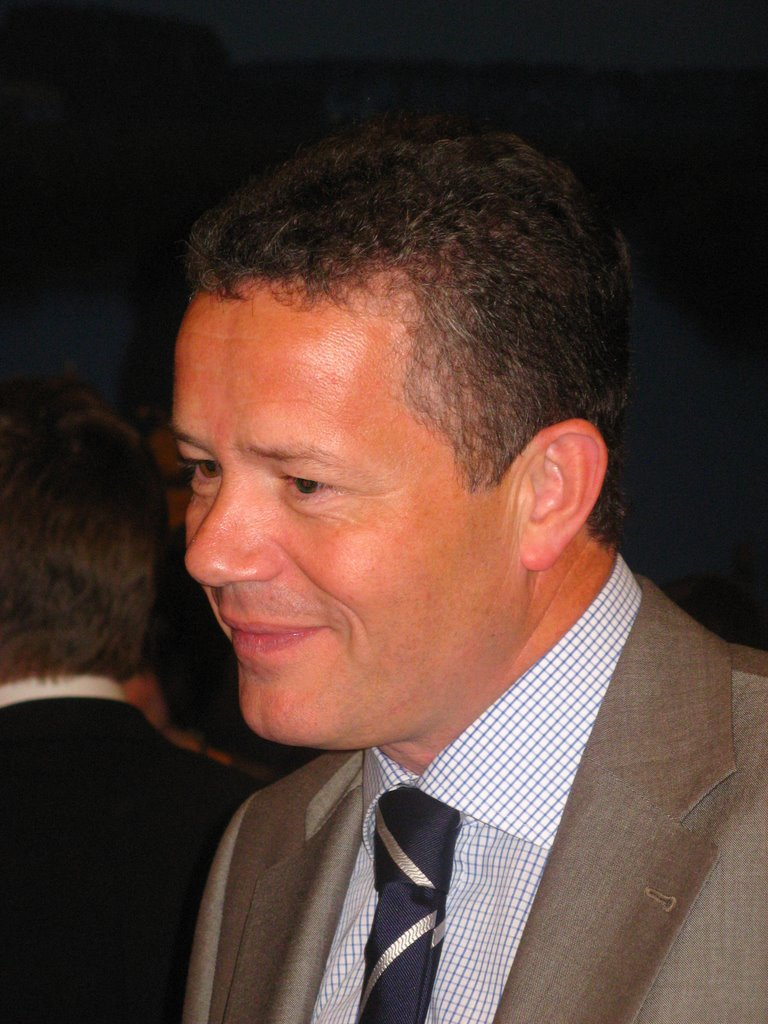
Frank Vanhecke (seen in 2008) succeeded Karel Dillen as leader of the Vlaams Blok in 1996.

In the 1994 European election, the party doubled its seats (Dillen and Vanhecke) with 12.6% of the vote, but failed to continue a European Right group, due to other nationalist parties having dropped out of the parliament, or refusing to join a group. National Front and Vlaams Blok MEPs nevertheless established an "alliance" called The Coordination of the European Right. In 1996, party leader Karel Dillen, who had been nominated to hold his position for life, stepped down and personally appointed Frank Vanhecke as his successor. The choice of Vanhecke was seen a compromise between the Flemish nationalist wing around Annemans and the Lepenist wing around Dewinter, thus avoiding a potential internal struggle. In 1999, elections were scheduled for the European Parliament, the Chamber of Representatives and Senate and the Flemish Parliament, where the Vlaams Blok overtook the position as the third largest Flemish party, winning more than 15% of the vote in all elections, and a total of 45 seats in the various parliaments. The Vlaams Blok also benefitted from the further collapse of the People's Union, which was brought on by the VU's more national conservative members becoming disgruntled with the centre-left faction who had taken control of its leadership.

The Vlaams Blok continued to be particularly strong in and around Antwerp, where it received as much as 33% of the vote in the 2000 local elections. In 2001, the party was forced to alter its political program, as according to the laws for party financing, it was not compatible with the European Treaty on Human Rights. In 2002, the Vlaams Blok was the only party to vote unanimously against the introduction of same-sex marriage.

In the 2004 Flemish Parliament election, the party finally became the single largest party group in parliament. The party was invited by the formateur for government discussions, only to find that its differences with the other parties was insurmountable, resulting in the three traditional parties forming a majority government, retaining the cordon sanitaire. By this time, the party had nevertheless become the very most popular Flemish party in Belgium, being supported by about one in four of the Flemish electorate.

=== Court of Cassation ruling (2004) ===
In October 2000, the Centre for Equal Opportunities and Opposition to Racism, together with the Dutch-speaking Human Rights League in Belgium registered a complaint at the Correctional Court, in which they claimed that three non-profit organisations connected to the Vlaams Blok (its education and research office and the "National Broadcasting Corporation") had violated the 1981 anti-racism law. The publications which were referred to included its 1999 election agenda and 1997 party platform. The challenged passages included those where the party called for a separate education system for foreign children, a special tax for employers employing non-European foreigners, and a restriction of unemployment benefits and child allowances for non-European foreigners.

"Today, our party has been killed, not by the electorate but by the judges."

— Frank Vanhecke, 9 November 2004.

In June 2001, the Brussels Correctional Court declared itself incompetent to hear the case, as it related to political misconduct. In February 2003, the Brussels Appellate Court followed and gave a similar judgement. The original plaintiffs then appealed, and the case was sent to the court of appeal in Ghent, which upheld the complaint; the Vlaams Blok non-profit organisations were fined, and it was deemed that the Vlaams Blok was an organisation that sanctioned discrimination. The Vlaams Blok lodged an appeal which was rejected, and in November 2004, the ruling was made definite, when it was upheld by the Court of Cassation. The ruling meant that the party would lose access to state funding and access to television, effectively shutting the party down.

==== Reactions ====
The whole trial was seen by some as a political trial, inspired by the Belgian establishment. The federal parliament had notably amended the Constitution in order to create legal possibilities to condemn the party. The Vlaams Blok also pointed at the problem of political nomination of judges, and again claimed that the lawsuit had been a political process coordinated with the Belgian Ministry of the Interior.

The leadership of the Vlaams Blok seized the occasion of the ban to dissolve the party, and start afresh under a new name. Five days later, on 14 November, the Vlaams Blok disbanded itself, and a new party with the name Vlaams Belang was established. (Other proposed names included the Flemish People's Party and Flemish Freedom Front.) The new party instituted a number of changes in its political program, carefully moderating some of the more extreme positions of the former Vlaams Blok. Nevertheless, the party leadership made it clear that the party would fundamentally remain the same.

Professor Lamine (KUL), a former Vlaams Blok member and "advisor" of the party's legal team, claimed that the party, for propaganda reasons, purposely undertook a weak defence, in order to lose the case; "For the party leaders, losing was much more interesting. Winning just wasn't an option." Lamine himself had earlier stated that the party should have carried the trial to the European Court of Human Rights, but Vlaams Blok senator Joris Van Hauthem had already stated in 2005, that; "If we had gone to Strasbourg [ECHR] based on procedural arguments, we might have had a case. But Lamine already put in a private claim to overturn the Appeals Court verdict, on the basis of substantive arguments. If Vlaams Belang were to put forth a claim against the verdict as well, at Strasbourg, the Court will bundle both cases. Then we would lose the case for sure. Lamine has thus given us the final blow."

== Ideology ==
The main ideological and political strategies of the Vlaams Blok started out with its radical nationalist rejection of the People's Union compromise on the Flemish autonomy issue, later to be followed by focus on immigration and security, exploitation of corruption and other scandals, and defense of traditional values. While the party was legitimized first and foremost by its defense of Flemish interests and desire for Flemish independence, its voters were mainly motivated by anti-immigration, law and order and anti-establishment protest.

=== Flemish nationalism ===
The main issue for the party was Flemish nationalism, and most issues that were added later, were in some way also connected to this. The Flemish nationalism promoted by the party (volksnationalisme) was according to its program "based on the ethnic community being a naturally occurring entity whose cultural, material, ethical and intellectual interests need to be preserved." While the party primarily worked for an independent Flemish state (modeling the split on that of Czechoslovakia), it for a long time also promoted the idea that the new state should merge with the Netherlands, and establish a Dutch-speaking federation (Greater Netherlands). From the 1990s however, the latter idea was downplayed by the party, as the Netherlands then turned into a "permissive, multicultural and social-democratic state" according to one scholar (although this Dutch political situation would be sharply overturned in the 2000s).

=== Immigration, minorities ===
Immigration became an important issue for the Vlaams Blok from the late 1980s. Party founder Karel Dillen called for "the return of the vast majority of non-European guest workers to their own homeland" and argued for this to happen "within a reasonable period." Interconnected with the Flemish nationalism issue, immigrants were considered to be a threat to the Flemish ethnic community. In 1992, the party established its 70-point plan, which included measures to stop all immigration, return most immigrants to their native countries by force, and legally discriminate against residing migrants in respect of markets such as labour, housing and education. The party's opponents particularly saw its immigration program as a source of claims of racism, and the party thus in its latest years downplayed the relevance of the 70-point plan, and softened its written positions regarding immigration.

Concerns about crime and security was also linked to immigration, as the party particularly blamed Turks and Moroccans for various criminal activity, and sought a zero tolerance approach regarding law and order. The party was also strongly anti-Islamic from early on, and in its 1993 program regarded Islam as "a doctrine, which preaches holy war, assassination, forced conversions, oppression of women, slavery and extermination of "infidels", [which] will automatically lead to what we now call fundamentalism." The party was anti-Muslim and portrayed Muslims as fifth column of a cruel and expansionist religion, and after the 1990 Gulf War called on the government to introduce measures to keep Belgium from being Islamised. Academic Hans-Georg Betz has described Vlaams Blok as one of the first radical European populist parties to pursue and gain support through an anti-Islamic agenda.

The party was according to political scientist Cas Mudde only very rarely accused of anti-Semitism – and even then, it was strongly condemned by the party leadership. When Roeland Raes cast doubt on the scale of the Holocaust in a television interview in 2001 for instance, the party leadership immediately called an emergency meeting, distanced itself from him and forced him to resign. The party also took screening measures against its local candidates to reveal any possible extremist connections, and rather wanted to risk not being able to fill its lists, rather than filling them with extremists. Particularly, the party wanted to distance itself from Holocaust denial, as it actively sought to reach out to Jewish voters in Antwerp.

=== Social issues ===
In 2003, the Vlaams Blok was the only major Flemish party to vote against the legalization of same-sex marriage in Belgium. The party was not opposed to homosexuality and supported civil partnerships for same-sex couples, but regarded same-sex marriage as a step too far.

=== Anti-establishment ===
Another element in the ideology of the party was a populist fight against the political establishment, often manifested through political scandals which flourished in 1990s Belgium; including corruption, food and even pedophile scandals. These included the Agusta scandal and the Marc Dutroux affair. The usual suspects were politicians in the three traditional party families; especially the francophone parties.

=== Economy ===
The party had no strong economic preferences, and generally supported a mixed economy. While it supported privatisation and tax reductions for small and medium businesses, it also sometimes supported protectionism and defended the welfare state, especially if allocated to the native Flemish population.

=== Foreign policy ===
The party was the only major Belgian party that opposed Belgium's membership of the European Union, as well as the idea of a federal Europe itself. It however defended a con-federal Europe based on sovereign culturally homogeneous nation-states. The European issue was however not an issue the party promoted much.

It also favoured the abolition of the United Nations, citing; "The illogical composition of the Security Council. The unwieldy bureaucracy. The democratic deficit." The party did also not have any faith in such a world community or international legal system, questioning the entire logic behind the UN. It rejected the view of any international consensus about concepts as democracy, justice, freedom and human rights, especially since most of its member countries are non-Western and undemocratic.

== International relations ==
The Vlaams Blok maintained good contacts with nationalist parties throughout Europe and other countries. The Vlaams Blok did traditionally have the closest contacts with Dutch and South African far-right groups, including the Dutch Centre Party '86, the Centre Democrats and Voorpost, and the South African Boerestaat Party. In the mid-1980s, it also established close relations particularly with the French National Front, as well as the German People's Union, The Republicans and National Democratic Party of Germany. In the 1990s, it supported the minor Dutch Block party, which had modeled itself directly on the Vlaams Blok.

The party also became very active in establishing contacts with post-communist parties in Eastern European countries, including the Croatian Party of Rights, Slovak National Party and IMRO – Bulgarian National Movement. While not keeping official contacts, it was in addition very supportive of left-wing nationalist parties such as the Scottish National Party, Irish Sinn Féin and Basque Herri Batasuna. Some of the parties it established contacts with most recently was the Freedom Party of Austria and the Italian Lega Nord, which after a period of distrust, maintained contacts since 2002.

== Election results ==
Note that the election results in elections other than those for the Flemish Parliament (and the Dutch-speaking electoral college in the European Parliament) gives a somewhat wrong image of the party's support, given that the party only ran in Flanders, the one half of Belgium.

=== Chamber of Representatives ===
Belgian Chamber of Representatives
Election year	# of total votes	% of overall vote	# of seats won
1978	75,635	1.4%	1
1981	66,424	1.8%	1
1985	85,391	1.4%	1
1987	116,534	1.9%	2
1991	405,247	6.6%	12
1995	475,677	7.8%	11
1999	613,523	9.9%	15
2003	761,407	11.6%	18

=== Senate ===
Belgian Senate
Election year	# of overall votes	% of vote	# of seats won
1978	80,809	1.5%	0
1981	71,733	1.2%	0
1985	90,120	1.5%	0
1987	122,953	2.0%	1
1991	414,481	6.8%	5
1995	475,667	7.7%	3
1999	583,208	9.4%	4
2003	741,940	11.3%	5

=== Flemish Parliament ===
Flemish Parliament
Election year	# of overall votes	% of vote	# of seats won
1995	465,239	12.3%	15
1999	603,345	15.5%	20
2004	981,587	24.2%	32

=== European Parliament ===
Results in the Dutch-speaking electoral college is given in the parenthesis.

European Parliament
Election year	# of overall votes	% of vote	# of seats won
1984	73,174	1.3% (2.1%)	0
1989	241,117	4.1% (6.6%)	1
1994	463,919	7.8% (12.6%)	2
1999	584,392	9.4% (15.1%)	2
2004	930,731	14.3% (23.2%)	3

== Bibliography ==
- Coffé, Hilde (2005). "The adaptation of the extreme right's discourse: the case of the Vlaams Blok". Ethical Perspectives (2). European Centre for Ethics, Katholieke Universiteit Leuven: 205–230. doi:10.2143/EP.12.2.630049. Archived from the original on 29 February 2012.
- De Winter, Lieven (July 2004). Casals, Xavier (ed.). The Vlaams Blok and the heritage of extreme-right flemish-nationalism. The extreme right in Europe, a many faceted reality. Sabadell University. Archived from the original on 6 February 2017.
- Erk, Jan (May 2005). "From Vlaams Blok to Vlaams Belang: The Belgian Far-Right Renames Itself". West European Politics. 28 (3): 493–502. doi:10.1080/01402380500085681. S2CID 143126680.
- Mudde, Cas (2003). The ideology of the extreme right. Manchester University Press. ISBN 978-0-7190-6446-3. Archived from the original on 2 February 2021.
- Swyngedouw, Marc; Abts, Koen; Van Craaen, Maarten (2007). "Our Own People First in a Europe of Peoples: The International Policy of the Vlaams Blok". In Liang, Christina Schori (ed.). Europe for the Europeans: the foreign and security policy of the populist radical right. Ashgate. pp. 81–102. ISBN 978-0-7546-4851-2.
