= List of mayors of Antwerp =

This is a list of mayors of Antwerp throughout history. The names of acting mayors are written in italic.

== 1500 ==
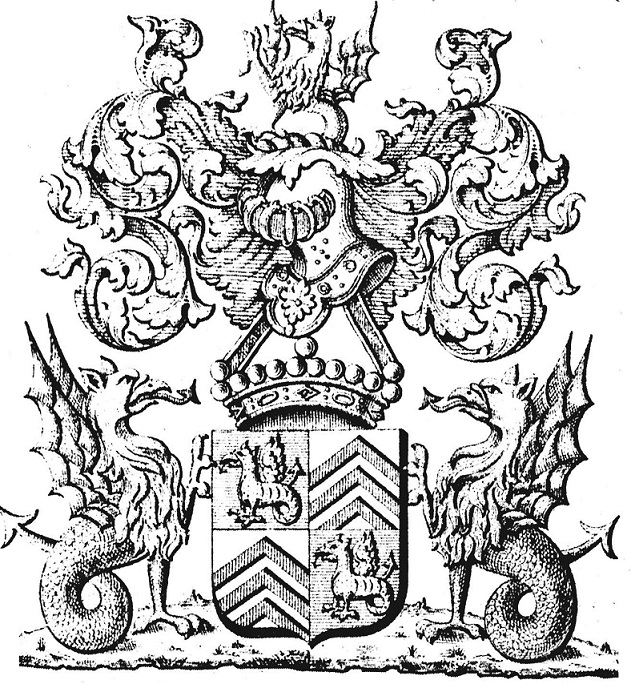
Coat of the House of Draeck

- 1500: Willem Draeck, Lord of Merksem. and Gillis de Schermere
- 1501: Willem Draeck, Lord of Merksem. and Gillis de Schermere
- 1502: Gillis van Berchem and Kosten van Halmale
- 1503: Hendrik van der Moelen and Gillis de Schermere
- 1504: Gillis van Berchem and Kosten van Halmale
- 1505: Kosten van Berchem and Gillis de Schermere
- 1506: Arnold van Liere and Jan van de Werve
- 1507: Jan van Berchem and Willem Draeck
- 1508: Willem Draeck, Arnold de Buekelere and Jan van de Werve
- 1509: Willem van Immerseele and Arnold van Liere
- 1510: Arnold van de Werve and Gillis van Berchem
- 1512: Arnold van Liere and Willem Draeck
- 1513: Willem Draeck and Arnold van Liere
- 1514: Jan van de Werve and Willem Draeck
- 1515: Gillis van Berchem and Arnold van Liere
- 1516–1517: Willem Draeck and Arnold van Liere
- 1518: Jan van de Werve, Willem Draeck and Filips de Buekeleren
- 1519: Peeter van der Moelen and Arnold van Liere
- 1520: Arnold van Liere and Willem Draeck
- 1521: Gerard van de Werve and Filips de Buekelere
- 1522: Willem Draeck and Arnold van Liere
- 1523: Arnold van de Werve and Arnold van Liere
- 1524: Willem Draeck and Kasper van Halmale
- 1525: Arnold van de Werve and Arnold van Liere
- 1526: Willem van Liere and Kasper van Halmale
- 1527: Arnold van Liere and Adriaan Hertsen
- 1528: Kasper van Halmale and Arnold van Liere
- 1529: Gerard van de Werve, Arnold van Liere and Adriaan van Hertsen
- 1530: Willem van Liere and Adriaan Hertsen
- 1531: Arnold van de Werve and Arnold Schoyte
- 1532: Arnold van de Werve, Willem van Liere and Lancelot van Ursel
- 1533: Lancelot van Ursel and Willem Draeck
- 1534: Cornelis van Spangen and Lancelot van Ursel
- 1535: Willem van Liere and Gabriel Triapain
- 1536: Cornelis van Spangen and Nikolaas van der Meeren
- 1537: Frans van der Dilft and Nikolaas van der Meeren
- 1538–1539: Cornelis van Spangen and Lancelot van Ursel
- 1540: Lancelot van Ursel and Frans van der Dilft
- 1541: Cornelis van Spangen and Jan van Crombah
- 1542: Lancelot van Ursel and Nikolaas de Schermere
- 1543: Willem van Halmale and Lancelot van Ursel
- 1544: Jan van Crombach and Lancelot van Ursel
- 1545: Lancelot van Ursel and Jan Scheyfve
- 1546: Michiel van der Heyden and Hendrik van Berchem
- 1547: Cornelis van Spangen and Lancelot van Ursel
- 1548: Lancelot van Ursel and Hendrik van Berchem
- 1549: Nikolaas van der Meeren and Jacob Hertsen
- 1550: Nikolaas van der Meeren and Nikolaas de Schermere
- 1551-1552: Dirk van de Werve and Jacob Herisen
- 1553: Nikolaas van der Meeren and Jan Happaert
- 1554: Hendrik van Berchem and Dirk van de Werve
- 1555-1557: Antoon van Stralen and Nikolaas Rockox sr.
- 1558: Alvaro D'Almaras and Hendrik van Berchem
- 1559: Alvaro D'Almaras, Jan van Schoonhoven and Hendrik van Berchem
- 1560: Jan van Schoonhoven and Nikolaas Rockox sr.
- 1561: Antoon van Stralen and Hendrik van Berchem
- 1562-1563: Lancelot van Ursel and Nikolaas Rockox sr.
- 1564: Hendrik van Berchem and Jan van Schoonhoven
- 1565: Antoon van Stralen and Lancelot van Ursel
- 1566-1567: Hendrik van Berchem and Jacob van der Heyden
- 1568: Jan van Schoonhoven and Hendrik van Etten
- 1569-1570: Hendrik van Berchem and Jan Wolfaert
- 1571-1572: Lancelot van Ursel and Jan van der Meeren
- 1573: Lancelot van Ursel, Jan van Schoonhoven and Jan van der Meeren
- 1574-1575: Jan van Schoonhoven and Nikolaas Rockox I.
- 1576: Hendrik van Berchem, Jan van der Meeren and Jan Wolfaert
- 1577: Jan van Schoonhoven and Jan van Stralen
- 1578: Jan van Stralen and Willem de Vos
- 1579-1580: Jan Junius van Leefdale and Rutgeert van Leefdale
- 1581-1582: Filips van Schoonhoven and Peeter van Aelst
- 1583-1584: Filips van Marnix van Sint-Aldegonde and Jacob van Wachtendonck
- 1585-1587: Eduard van der Dilft and Adriaan van Heylwegen
- 1588: Jan Damant and Balten van Vlierden
- 1589-1590: Eduard van der Dilft and Karel Malineus
- 1591: Hendrik van Halmale and Adriaan van Heylwegen
- 1592-1593: Blasius de Bejar and Gillis Gerard
- 1594-1595: Eduard van der Dilft and Karel Malineus
- 1596-1597: Jacob Dassa and Hendrik van Etten
- 1598-1599: Blasius de Bejar and Hendrik van Halmale

== 1600 ==
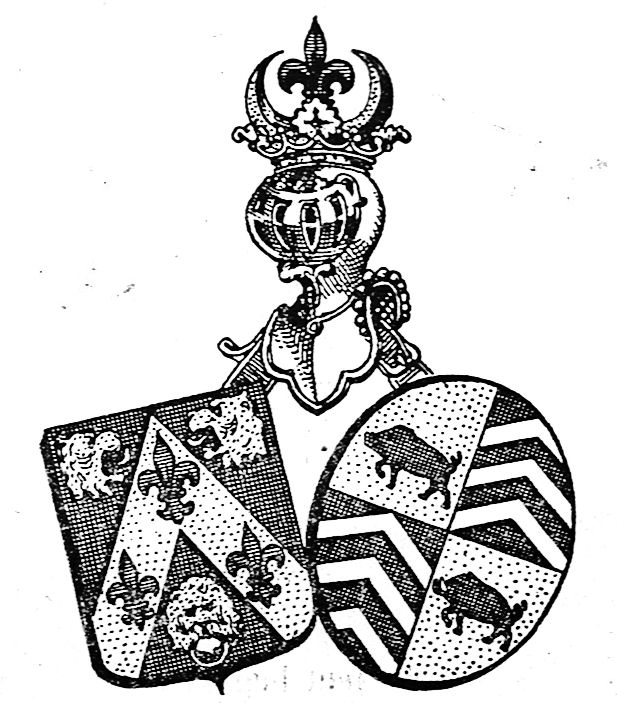
Jean-Baptiste della Faille

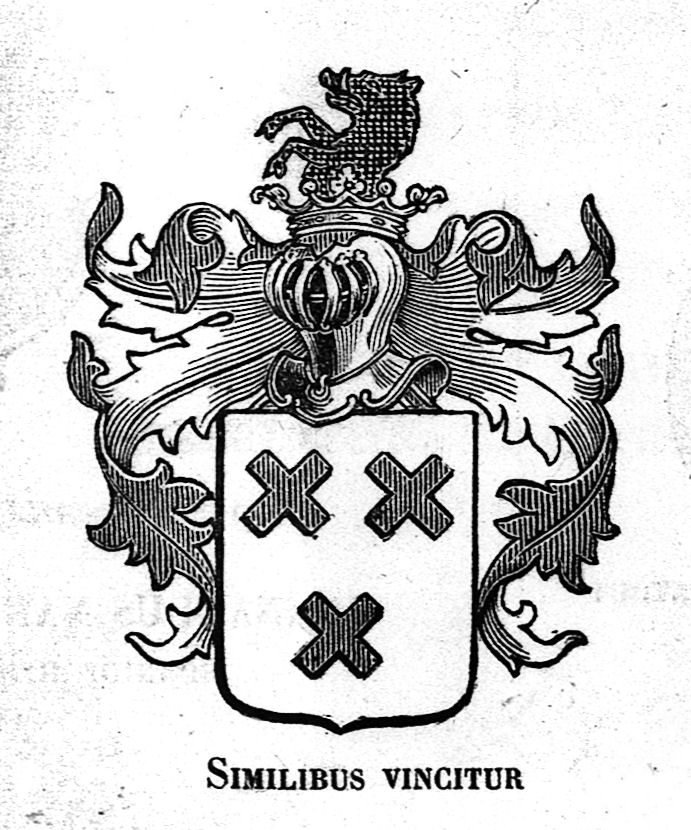
Vander Dilft

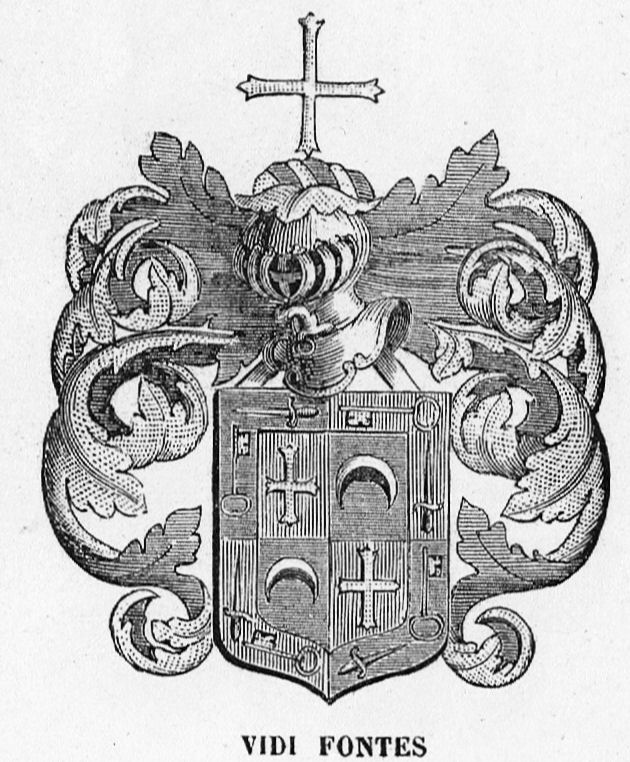
Blasivs de Bejar

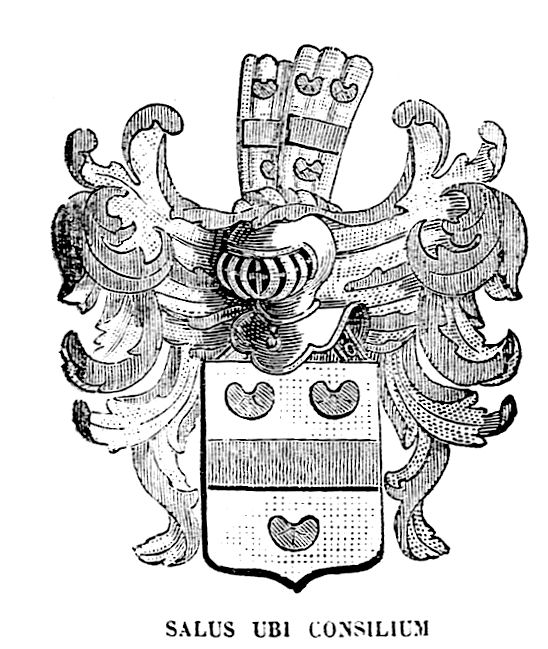
Nicolas rockocx, Esq.

- 1600-1601: Jacob Dassa and Gilles de Mera
- 1602: Eduard van der Dilft and Jan van Brecht
- 1603: Nikolaas Rockox II. and Balten de Robiano
- 1604: Jacob Dassa and Hendrik van Etten
- 1605: Nikolaas Rockox II. and Kasper Rovelasca
- 1606-1607: Blasius de Bejar and Hendrik van Etten
- 1608-1609: Nikolaas Rockox II. and Hendrik van Halmale
- 1610: Jacob Dassa and Gillis de Mera
- 1611: Nikolaas Rockox II and Hendrik van Etten
- 1612-1613: Blasius de Bejar and Gillis Gerardi
- 1614: Jacob Dassa and Jan Happaert
- 1615: Nikolaas Rockox II. and Hendrik van Etten
- 1616: Blasius de Bejar and Antoon van Berchem
- 1617: Nikolaas Rockox II. and Pauwel van Liere
- 1618: Jan Happaert and Hendrik van de Werve
- 1619: Lancelot Tseraerts and Frans de Schot
- 1620: Hendrik van Etten and Jan van Stembor
- 1621: Nikolaas Rockox II. and Karel de Mera
- 1622: Jan van Stembor and Robrecht Tucher
- 1623: Jan Happaert and Karel de Mera
- 1624: Engelbrecht van Oyenbrugge and Pauwel van Liere
- 1625: Nikolaas Rockox II. and Robrecht Tucher
- 1626: Robrecht Tucher and Frans Gallo de Salamanca
- 1627: Frans Gallo de Salamanca and Filips van Vlierden
- 1628-1630: Antoon Sivori and Robrecht Tucher
- 1631: Hendrik van Etten, Filips van Vlierden and Andries Gerardi
- 1632: Antoon Sivori and Robrecht Tucher
- 1633: Jan de Bejar and Karel de Santa Cruz
- 1634-1635: Robrecht Tucher and Jan Roose
- 1636: Hendrik van Etten and Karel de Santa Cruz
- 1637: Robrecht Tucher and Jan Roose
- 1638: Antoon Sivori and Karel de Santa Cruz
- 1639: Antoon Sivori, Karel de Santa Cruz and Jan Roose
- 1640: Jan Roose and Robrecht Tucher
- 1641: Jan Roose, Antoon Sivori and Robrecht Tucher
- 1642-1643: Antoon Sivori and Jacob van Buren
- 1644-1645: Gooris del Plano and Melchior Haeckx
- 1646-1647: Hendrik van Halmale and Antoon Sivori
- 1648: Gooris del Plano and Melchior Haeckx
- 1649-1650: Hendrik van Halmale and Alexander Goubau
- 1651: Filips Schoyte and Jacob van Buren
- 1652: Alexander Goubau, Gooris del Plano and Jacob van Buren
- 1653: Alexander Goubau and Jacob van Buren
- 1654: Hendrik van Halmale and Jan Snijers
- 1655: Floris van Berchem and Jan Snijers
- 1656: Frans Paschier van den Cruyce and Jan Snijers
- 1657-1658: Floris van Berchem and Gooris Martens
- 1659: Hendrik van Halmale and Gillis Martens
- 1660: Hendrik van Halmale and Jan van Weerden
- 1661: Jan Antoon Tucher and Jan van Weerden
- 1662: Jan Antoon Tucher and Gillis Martens
- 1663-1664: Hendrik van de Werve and Gillis Martens
- 1665: Hendrik van Halmale and Willem des Pommereaux
- 1666: Alexander Goubau and Gillis Martens
- 1667-1668: Hendrik van de Werve and Jan Snijers
- 1669: Hendrik van Halmale and Jan Baptist Greyns
- 1670-1671: Jan Antoon Tucher and Floris van Berchem
- 1672: Floris van Berchem and Jan Vecquemans
- 1673: Floris van Berchem and Jan Baptist Greyns
- 1674: Hendrik van Halmale and Jan Baptist Greyns
- 1675: Hendrik van de Werve and Filips Schoyte
- 1676-1677: Hendrik van Halmale and Librecht van den Hove
- 1678: Floris van Berchem and Jan Baptist Greyns
- 1679: Filips Frans de Varick and Filips Schoyte
- 1680: Floris van Berchem and Jan Baptist della Faille
- 1681: Jan Baptist Greyns and Nikolaas Jozef van Halmale
- 1682: Floris van Berchem and Jacob Antoon de Witte
- 1683: Nikolaas Jozef van Halmale and Jan Baptist Greyns
- 1684: Peeter Happaert and Jacob Antoon de Witte
- 1685: Nikolaas Jozef van Halmale and Paschier Ignatius van den Cruyce
- 1686: Jan Baptist Greyns and Gooris Martens
- 1687: Paschier Ignatius van den Cruyce and Jan Augustijn de Lannoy
- 1688: Nikolaas Jozef van Halmale and Theodoor Andries van Kessel
- 1689: Jan Baptist della Faille and Steven Cornelis Janssens
- 1690: Jan Augustijn de Lannoy and Leonel Stevens
- 1691: Eduard van Broeckhoven and Filips Rubens
- 1692-1693: Nikolaas Jozef van Halmale and Gooris Martens
- 1694: Paschier Ignatius van den Cruyce and Jan Augustijn de Lannoy
- 1695: Jan Karel van Hove and Gooris Martens
- 1696: Nikolaas Jozef van Halmale and Jan Jozef Vecquemans
- 1697: Eduard van Broeckhoven and Rochus van de Zande
- 1698: Paschier Ignatius van den Cruyce and Rochus van de Zande
- 1699: Paschier Ignatius van den Cruyce and Hendrik Comperis

== 1700s ==
Mayor	Year of mayorship
Charles Joseph della Faille	1730
Charles Joseph della Faille,	1731
John Auguste, Baron of Hove	1743
John Auguste, Baron of Hove	1744
Charles Joseph della Faille	1753
Charles Joseph della Faille	1754
Charles Joseph della Faille	1755
Peter Frans of Schorel, Lord of Wilryck	1761
Peter Frans of Schorel, Lord of Wilryck	1762
Peter Frans of Schorel, Lord of Wilryck	1763
Peter Frans of Schorel, Lord of Wilryck	1789
Peter Frans of Schorel, Lord of Wilryck	1790
Peter Frans of Schorel, Lord of Wilryck	1792
John-Baptiste, Count of Baillet	1793
John-Baptiste, Count of Baillet	1794
Jacob Reynoud, Cornelis Reyns, Karel d'Or, Peeter Guedon, Steven Abbeltier, Hendrik Franck	1797
Jan Martinides, Frans Verbelen	1798
Frans Verbelen, Jan Gabriëls, Josef Georgerie	1799

== 1800s ==
Mayor	Office Entered	Office Left	Notes
Josef Georgerie, Peeter Raeymaekers	January 1, 1800	December 31, 1801	
Jan Steven Werbrouck	January 29, 1801	July 27, 1811	
Jan Baptist de Cornelissen	October 1, 1811	May 1, 1814	Youngest mayor Antwerp ever had (24)

== United Kingdom of the Netherlands ==
Name	Date of birth	Office entered	Office left	Date of death	Party
Filip Vermoelen	February 27, 1759	May 2, 1814	July 24, 1817	February 15, 1825	None
Florent Van Ertborn	April 4, 1784	July 25, 1817	November, 1828	August 20, 1840	None (Orangist)
Willem Andreas de Caters	November 30, 1773	November, 1828	October 26, 1830	February 9, 1859	None

== Belgium ==
=== 1800s ===
Name	Date of birth	Office entered	Office left	Date of death	Party
Frans Verdussen	May 10, 1783	October 26, 1830	October 28, 1830	May 11, 1850	None (Cath. Unionist)
Antoine Dhanis van Cannart	January 26, 1792	October 29, 1830	December 11, 1830	November 19, 1855	None (Cath. Unionist)
Alexis Gleizes	1773	December 9, 1830	February 10, 1831	February 29, 1832	None (Cath. Unionist)
Gérard Le Grelle First mayor after the Belgian Revolution	January 6, 1793	February 14, 1831	November 5, 1848	October 28, 1871	None (Cath. Unionist)
Jan Frans Loos	November 12, 1799	November 6, 1848	March 30, 1863	February 2, 1871	LP
Xavier Gheysens	May 19, 1799	March 31, 1863	May 4, 1863	March 5, 1883	Meeting
Jozef Cornelis Van Put	June 15, 1811	May 5, 1863	September 1, 1872	July 2, 1877	Meeting
Leopold De Wael Died in office	July 14, 1823	September 2, 1872	August 17, 1892	August 17, 1892	LP
Georges Gits	April 30, 1839	August 17, 1892	November 7, 1892	March 27, 1923	LP
Jan Van Rijswijck Resigned office because of illness	February 14, 1853	November 7, 1892	February 16, 1906	September 23, 1906	LP

=== 1900s ===
Name	Date of birth	Office entered	Office left	Date of death	Party
Victor Desguin	January 30, 1838	February 16, 1906	August 6, 1906	July 8, 1919	LP
Alfons Hertogs	February 6, 1843	August 7, 1906	October 17, 1908	October 18, 1908	LP
Victor Desguin	January 30, 1838	October 18, 1908	March 14, 1909	July 8, 1919	LP
Jan De Vos	February 7, 1844	March 15, 1909	July 21, 1921	March 30, 1923	LP
Hector Lebon	November 22, 1863	July 22, 1921	November 5, 1921	October 27, 1935	KVB
Frans Van Cauwelaert	January 10, 1880	November 5, 1921	December 31, 1932	May 17, 1961	KVB
Camille Huysmans	May 26, 1871	January 1, 1933	August 2, 1946	February 25, 1968	BWP
Leo Delwaide (acting)	July 27, 1897	December 7, 1940	January 26, 1944	June 13, 1978	KB
Jan Timmermans (acting)	October 15, 1901	January 27, 1944	September 4, 1944	April 5, 1962	VNV
Emile Van Put (acting) Shortest-serving mayor of Antwerp		September 4, 1944	September 12, 1944		KB
Willem Eekelers (acting)	May 18, 1883	August 2, 1946	April 11, 1947	September 2, 1954	BSP
Lode Craeybeckx Longest-serving mayor of Antwerp	November 24, 1897	January 1, 1947	July 25, 1976	July 25, 1976	BSP
Leo Delwaide (acting)	July 27, 1897	July 26, 1976	September 5, 1976	June 13, 1978	CVP
Frans Detiège Former scabin for Social Affairs (1947-1976)	December 22, 1909	6 September 1976	31 December 1976	November 1, 1980	BSP
Mathilde Schroyens First female mayor in more than 550 years	December 28, 1912	1 January 1977	31 December 1983	February 27, 1996	BSP/SP
Bob Cools	April 27, 1934 (age 91)	1 January 1983	31 December 1994	Alive	SP
Leona Detiège Daughter of mayor Frans Detiège	November 26, 1942 (age 82)	1 January 1995	13 March 2003	Alive	SP/sp.a

=== 2000s ===
Portrait	Name	Term in office	Party affiliation
	Patrick Janssens (born 1956; aged 68)	10 July 2003 – 31 December 2012	SP.A
	Bart De Wever (born 1970; aged 54)	1 January 2013 – 3 February 2025	N-VA
	Els van Doesburg (born 1989; aged 35)	3 February 2025 – Incumbent	N-VA

== See also ==
- Timeline of Antwerp
