= Bart De Wever =

Prime Minister of Belgium since 2025

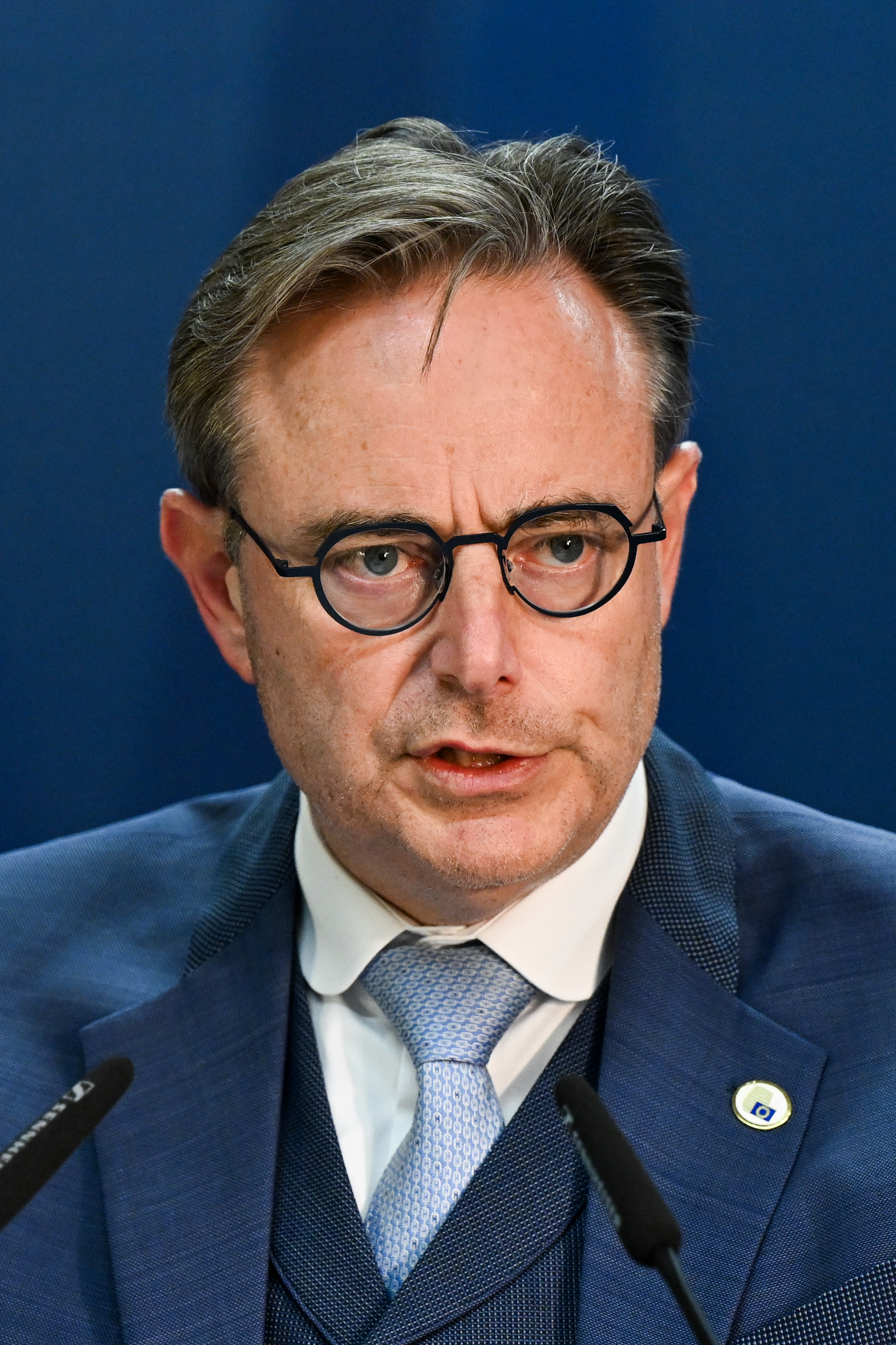
- De Wever in 2025

Prime Minister of Belgium
- Incumbent
- Assumed office 3 February 2025
- Monarch: Philippe
- Deputy: See list: Jan Jambon; David Clarinval; Maxime Prévot; Frank Vandenbroucke; Vincent Van Peteghem
- Preceded by: Alexander De Croo

Mayor of Antwerp
- In office 1 January 2013 – 3 February 2025
- Preceded by: Patrick Janssens
- Succeeded by: Els van Doesburg (acting)

President of the New Flemish Alliance
- In office 24 October 2004 – 3 February 2025
- Preceded by: Geert Bourgeois
- Succeeded by: Valerie Van Peel
Other positions
Member of the Chamber of Representatives
In office 10 July 2024 – 3 February 2025
Constituency	Antwerp
In office 19 June 2014 – 25 April 2019
Constituency	Antwerp
In office 28 June 2007 – 30 June 2009
Constituency	Antwerp
Member of the Flemish Parliament
In office 18 June 2019 – 8 June 2024
Constituency	Antwerp
In office 6 July 2004 – 28 June 2007
Constituency	Antwerp
Member of the Senate
In office 6 July 2010 – 9 January 2013
Appointed by	Flemish Parliament
Succeeded by	Wilfried Vandaele

Personal details
- Born: Bart Albert Liliane De Wever; 21 December 1970 (age 55) Mortsel, Belgium
- Party: New Flemish Alliance
- Other political affiliations: People's Union (until 2001)
- Spouse: Veerle Hegge
- Children: 4
- Education: KU Leuven

Bart Albert Liliane De Wever (Dutch: [ˈbɑrt də ˈʋeːvər]; born 21 December 1970), also known as BDW, is a Belgian politician who has served as the Prime Minister of Belgium since February 2025. From 2004 to 2025, De Wever had been the leader of the New Flemish Alliance (N-VA), a political party advocating Flemish independence. From January 2013 to February 2025, he was Mayor of Antwerp, following the 2012 municipal elections.

De Wever presided over his party's victory in the 2010 federal elections when N-VA became the largest party in both Flanders and in Belgium as a whole. He accomplished this again in the subsequent three elections, eventually being tasked with forming a new government by King Philippe following the 2024 elections.

After more than eight months of negotiations between the parties N-VA, Vooruit, CD&V, MR and Les Engagés, it was announced on 31 January 2025 that an agreement had been reached, with De Wever becoming the prime minister-designate. On 3 February 2025, De Wever took the oath of office, becoming the first Flemish nationalist politician to hold the office of prime minister of Belgium.

== Origins (1970–1994) ==
=== Early life and family ===
Bart Albert Liliane De Wever was born on 21 December 1970 in Mortsel and grew up in Kontich, where his parents Irene and Henri owned a small supermarket. His father had previously worked for a Belgian railway company and was briefly active in the Vlaamse Militanten Orde before becoming a local administrator for the Volksunie. De Wever's older brother is historian and professor Bruno De Wever, who teaches at Ghent University. His grandfather had been the secretary of the Flemish National Union, a Flemish far-right party from the interwar period that had been recognised as the ruling party of Flanders during the Nazi occupation of Belgium. However, during an interview, Bart De Wever nuanced his grandfather's past by claiming he had not collaborated with the Nazis.

=== Education ===
De Wever began studying a law degree at the University of Antwerp, but dropped out before switching to study history at Saint Ignatius University Centre, Antwerp and then the Catholic University of Leuven (KUL), graduating with a licentiate (equivalent of the master's degree). As a student he was a member of the classical liberal Liberaal Vlaams Studentenverbond (LVSV, Liberal Flemish Students' Union) and the conservative Katholiek Vlaams Hoogstudentenverbond (KVHV, Catholic Flemish Students' Union) of Antwerp and Leuven. He is a former editor-in-chief of the KVHV newspapers Tegenstroom (magazine of KVHV in Antwerp) and Ons Leven (in Leuven). After graduating, he was employed as a research assistant working on the Nieuwe Encyclopedie van de Vlaamse Beweging (New Encyclopedia of the Flemish Movement), as well as publishing a magazine article on the influence of Joris Van Severen.

== Political ascent (1994–2012) ==
=== Origins ===
De Wever initially started his political career as a member of the Volksunie (People's Union) party, which his father had belonged to, and was elected as a municipal councilor in Berchem for the party. During the ideological splits in the Volksunie, De Wever became part of the so-called Oranjehofgroep along with Frieda Brepoels, Eric Defoort, Ben Weyts and Geert Bourgeois. The Oranjehofgroup was a political clique within the Volksunie composed of right-wing, conservative-liberal and Flemish nationalist members who opposed the left-orientated direction the party was being taken under Bert Anciaux. The members of the Oranjehofgroep would later found the N-VA together.

=== Early party leadership ===
In 2004, he was elected as party leader of the N-VA with 95% of the votes, being the only candidate up for election. Initially, the N-VA had followed the political style of the People's Union by characterizing itself as a big tent party; however, under De Wever's leadership the N-VA took on a conservative identity and has seen a rise in support since. De Wever went through a rough stretch in 2006, when he accepted the conservative-liberal Jean-Marie Dedecker as an N-VA member, causing a split with the CD&V party. In order to reconcile the party, Dedecker had to leave. Although he was extensively criticised, the local N-VA leaders permitted De Wever to remain as N-VA president.

In 2007, a photograph was released of De Wever attending a conference held by the French extreme-right Front National leader Jean-Marie Le Pen in 1996 at the Flemish National Debate Club in Antwerp. In response to the controversy, De Wever stated "I had just finished my studies and I thought it was a unique opportunity to hear Le Pen, who was at the time a major figure in French politics. I am a legalist, with democratic convictions, but I have an Anglo-Saxon conception of freedom of expression: in a democracy, everyone must be free to express their opinion, even if it is an opinion that I hate. And I always prefer to have information first-hand rather than in a filtered manner." De Wever later criticized Le Pen as a "a showman who had no answers for anything" and said he had no connections to Le Pen's party.

In October 2007, after then Mayor of Antwerp Patrick Janssens issued an apology for the city's collaboration in the deportation of Jews during World War II, Bart De Wever said that:

"Antwerp did not organise the deportation of the Jews, it was the victim of Nazi occupation ... Those who were in power at the time had to take tricky decisions in difficult times. I don't find it very courageous to stigmatise them now."

After his comments were met with controversy, De Wever issued a personal apology to representatives of Antwerp's Jewish community and in an open letter to De Standaard. Following these events, in an op-ed published in Le Monde, Belgian French-speaking writer Pierre Mertens claimed that Bart De Wever was a "convinced negationist leader". De Wever sued Mertens for this allegation.

=== 2009–10 elections and aftermath ===
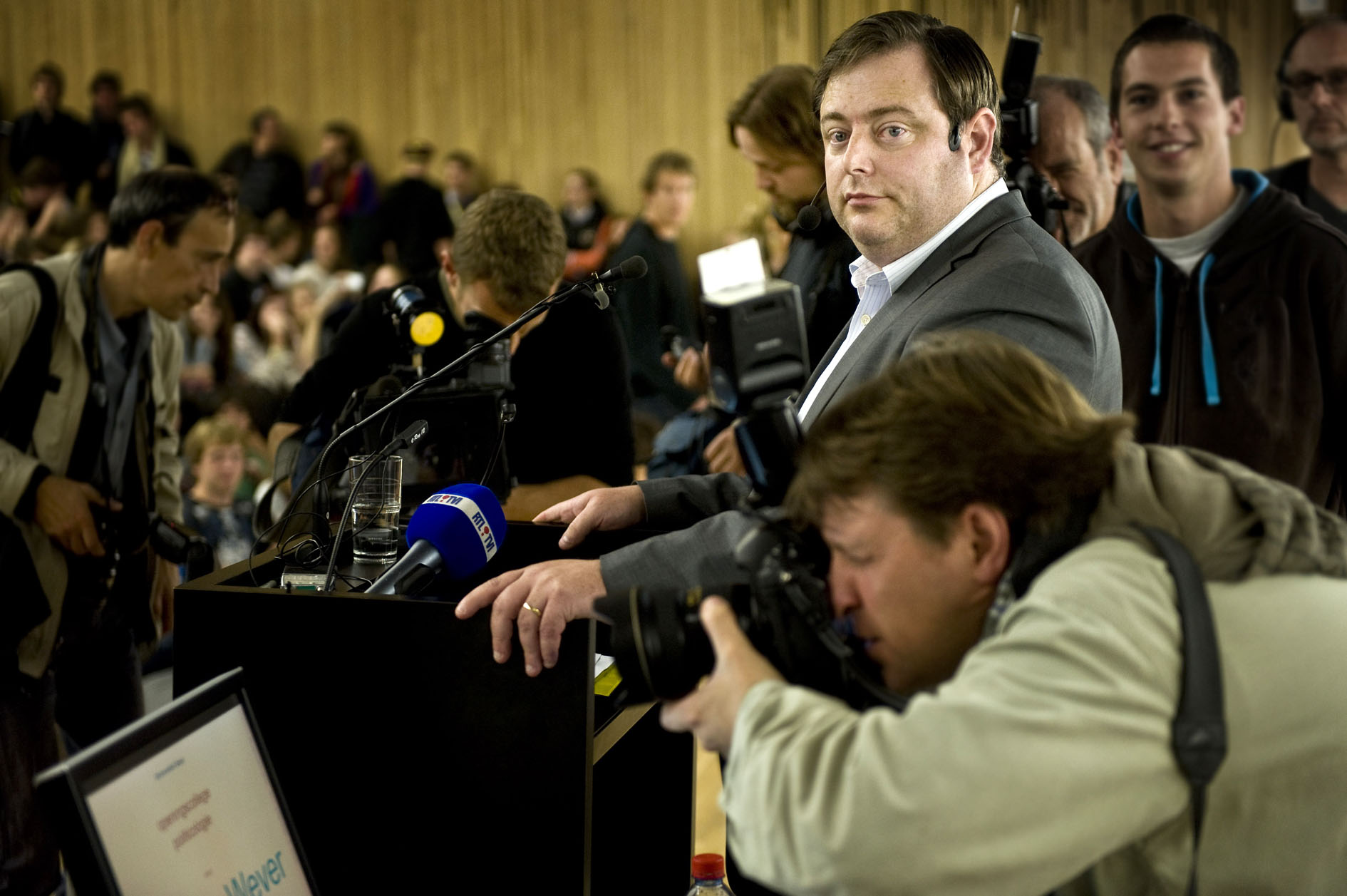
De Wever at a lecture in 2011

In the 2009 regional elections, his party won an unexpectedly high 13% of the votes, making N-VA the overall winner of the elections together with old cartel partner CD&V. N-VA subsequently joined the government, with De Wever choosing to remain party president and appointing two other party members as ministers in the Flemish Government and one party member as speaker of the Flemish Parliament. Wever visited former British Prime Minister David Cameron at 10 Downing Street on a number of occasions and maintained contact with Boris Johnson during his time as Mayor of London.

An early election was held on 13 June 2010, resulting in the N-VA winning most votes in the Dutch-speaking areas and the Socialist Party (PS) in French-speaking Belgium. Nationally the two parties were almost even with 27 seats for the N-VA and 26 for the PS, the remaining seats being split between ten other parties. For 541 days after the elections, no agreement could be reached among the parties on a coalition to form a new government and during that period the country continued to be governed by an interim government. On 6 December 2011, the Di Rupo I Government was sworn in. De Wever and the N-VA were not included in the makeup of this government, although he himself won the most preference votes of the Dutch-speaking region (nearly 800,000).

=== 2012 local election ===
In a groundbreaking result during the 2012 local elections, De Wever led the New Flemish Alliance to victory in the city of Antwerp with 37.7% of the vote.

== Mayoralty of Antwerp (2013–2025) ==
=== First term ===
De Wever's swearing-in as mayor of Antwerp on 1 January 2013 marked the first time since 1933 that a non-socialist politician (excluding Leo Delwaide) was mayor of the city. In December 2013, the Belgian newspaper Het Laatste Nieuws received a bullet in the post with a letter addressed to Bart De Wever, apparently from a communist extremist. De Wever received police protection. In November 2013, De Wever was admitted to hospital with severe anxiety and chest pains. He was readmitted into an intensive care unit in February 2014, with a severe lung infection.

==== 2014 federal election ====
Despite N-VA winning the 2014 federal election with their highest result ever, PS party leader Elio Di Rupo noted that his party would be unwilling to enter into a dialogue with De Wever and the N-VA in forming a new federal government.

==== 2018 local election ====
With a result of 35.3% of the vote, N-VA retained its leadership of Antwerp in the 2018 local elections, securing a second term for De Wever's mayoralty of the city.

=== Second term ===
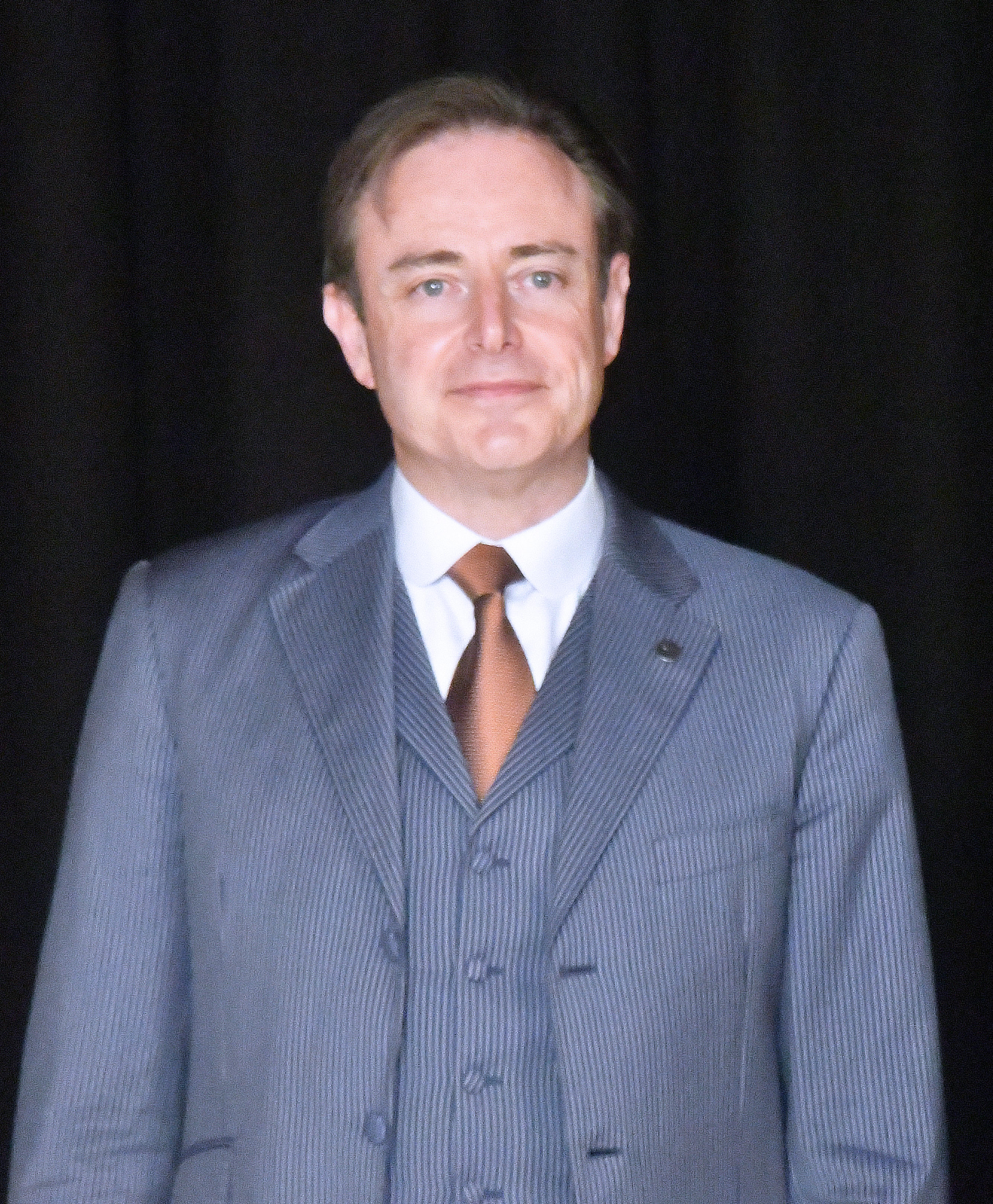
De Wever at the new year's gathering of N-VA, 2019

In a 2019 interview with Flemish newspaper De Zondag, De Wever argued that mass immigration was impacting on identity, enlightenment and integration, and that immigrants from Muslim backgrounds were more likely to force their beliefs in public over other religious groups, stating "I have not yet seen an Orthodox Jew who wants a counter function in Antwerp. They avoid conflict. That is the difference. Muslims do claim a place in public space, in education, with their outward signs of faith. That creates tensions" while arguing that he supports freedom of religion and worship. He also accused the left of cultural relativism, claiming "The same left that set bras on fire in May '68 is now embracing the headscarf as a symbol of equality. I find that very strange. They wanted to destroy Christianity, but they accept everything about Islam. I call that submission." De Wever's comments were criticised by Socialist Party politician Paul Magnette, who called them "a form of racism." Magnette's comments were in turn refuted by De Wever and N-VA minister Jan Jambon.

During the 2019 regional elections, N-VA lost 7 percent of the vote in Flanders compared to their result in 2014. Nevertheless, De Wever persevered as party president. Neither he nor his party entered into the coalition government of 2020, which was headed by Alexander De Croo.

After the 2019 federal election, De Wever began showing interest to make a new political centre-right movement, aiming to reduce the number of political parties in parliament and go to a more American and British style parliament with fractions within larger parties (drawing on the Conservative and Labour and Republican Party and Democratic Party dualism in the UK and USA respectively). De Wever expressed his desire to attract CD&V, Open VLD and some Vlaams Belang voters. Joachim Coens, former leader of CD&V, supported the idea and argued it would make future government formations easier.

In November 2020, he was reelected leader of the N-VA with 96.8% of the votes for a new three-year mandate. This made De Wever the longest serving leader of a Belgian political party.

In March 2022, he said during a radio interview that Russian President Vladimir Putin will not end Russia's invasion of Ukraine, as he is a "psychopath" and a "madman", adding: "[Putin] said: 'I will squash the Russians who are against me like mosquitoes'. When did I hear that before? I think here, 70 years ago." De Wever had earlier assessed that Vladimir Putin and Adolf Hitler were similarly motivated: "Germany was humiliated after the First World War, Russia after the Cold War. In both countries, an autocratic leader emerged with a clear ambition: to undo the humiliation. In Germany, it was Hitler, in Russia, Putin." De Wever went on to explain that this humiliation was taken personally by both men, who had each professionally represented their respective countries (Hitler as a soldier, and Putin as a KGB agent): "Both then unexpectedly resorted to irrational behavior. What the Sudetenland was to Hitler, Crimea was to Putin. There are many similarities."

Following the October 7 attacks in 2023 and the subsequent Gaza war, De Wever called for the Belgian Army to be deployed to protect Jewish sites in Antwerp. During a commemoration for the victims of the October 7 attacks in Antwerp, De Wever stated "there is only one side to choose: that is the side of Israel, the side of democracy and the side of light. Against the forces of tyranny, against the forces of darkness. We know that they have a long arm: the long arm of Tehran, of Hezbollah, of Hamas, which reaches into the streets of Europe." After the speech received some criticism from other Antwerp politicians such members of Vooruit and Groen leader Meyrem Almaci who claimed that both sides should respect human rights, De Wever stated "I have taken sides against terror and against Hamas" and argued that the war had also imported ethnic and sectarian conflicts in Belgium. Vooruit politician Tom Meeuws and deputy Alderman of Antwerp supported De Wever's speech.

==== 2024 elections and formation ====
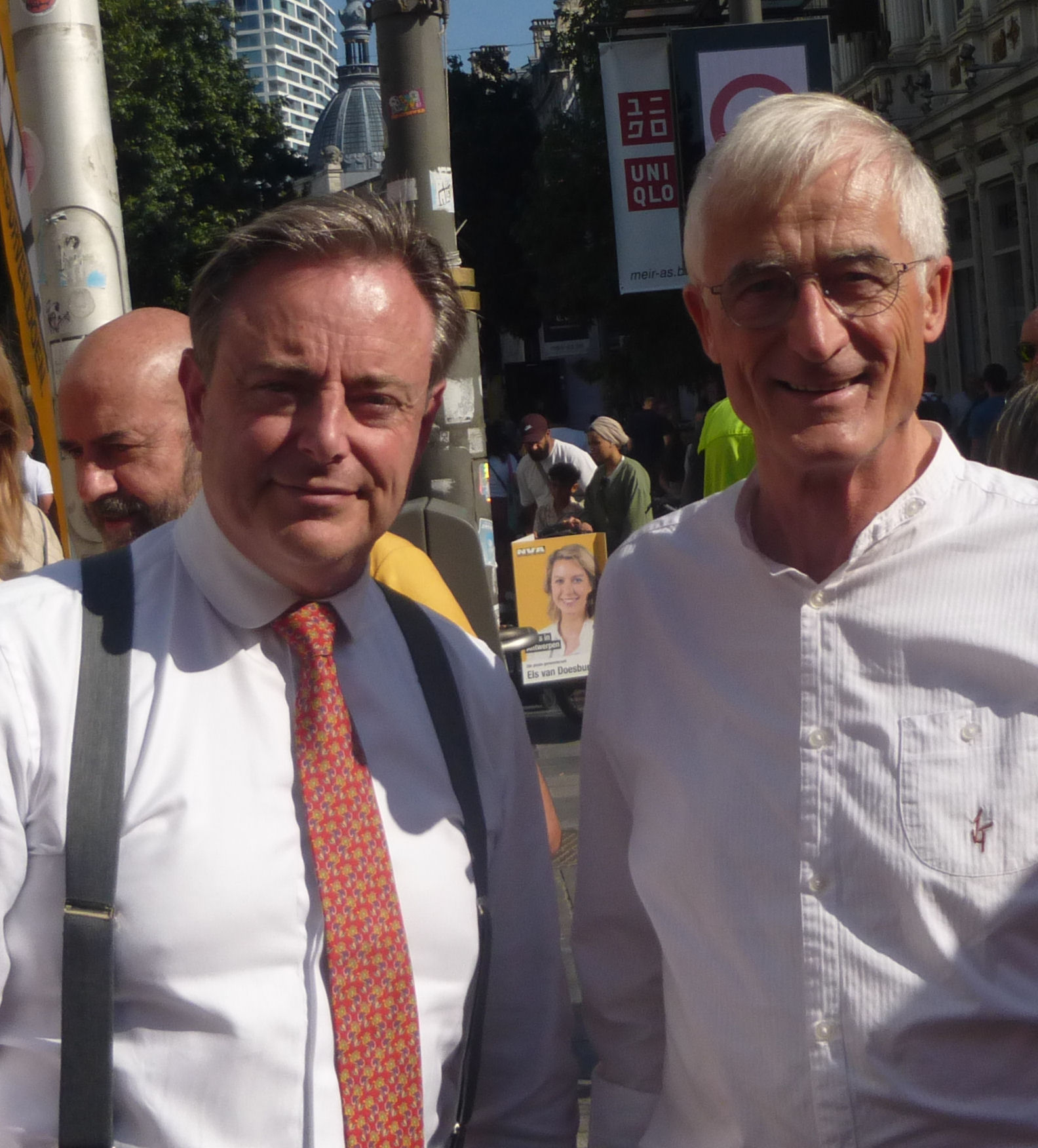
De Wever and Geert Bourgeois, his predecessor as party president, at a campaign rally in 2024

In the 2024 federal and the regional election in Flanders, De Wever's N-VA became the largest party in the Chamber of Representatives, narrowly beating the competing Vlaams Belang, though obtained the same number of seats as VB in the Flemish Parliament. On 10 July, the king appointed De Wever formateur, making him responsible for forming the next government. On 31 January 2025, a governmental agreement was reached between the N-VA, Vooruit, CD&V, MR and LE. De Wever announced the agreement by posting the Latin phrase Alea iacta est on social media.

== Premiership (2025–) ==
De Wever was officially sworn in as Prime Minister on 3 February 2025. He was the first Flemish nationalist and eurosceptic politician to serve as a Belgian prime minister, and his victory was described by some political observers to be a part of a recent trend of right-wing and populist governments in Western Europe. Despite his previous campaigns for Flemish independence, De Wever said in an interview with Walloon broadcaster RTBF that Francophone voters did not have to worry about his premiership and that he would aim to cooperate with parties from the French-speaking region in government. De Wever stated in his initial address that the core focuses of his government would be on welfare and tax reform, stricter immigration policies, reductions in European Union regulations, expanding nuclear power and increasing Belgium's defence spending to 2% of GDP by 2029 to meet NATO commitments.

=== Domestic policies ===
In April 2025, De Wever announced the "Easter Agreement" of future policies that were negotiated between the N-VA and Dutch and French-speaking parties in government. The deal included raising Belgium's defense budget partially funded from taxes on frozen Russian assets and establishing a "Defence Fund" supported dividends from state-owned companies. In the agreement, De Wever also said that unemployment benefits will be limited to a maximum of two years with exceptions for those studying medical degrees.

De Wever also pledged that Belgium would follow a stricter line on asylum and immigration by automatically rejecting asylum claims from migrants already registered in another EU country, tightened laws on family migration, raising the cost of applying for Belgian citizenship and returning foreign criminals housed in Belgian jails to their country of origin.

He decided to implement austerity measures, including a time limit on unemployment benefits (which had previously been unlimited but degressive), tougher pension rules (periods of unemployment would no longer be taken into account), a review of wage indexation methods, a review of VAT rates applicable to various consumer goods, budget cuts in government departments and public services, etc. The unions called on workers to mobilize against this plan, leading to a general strike at the end of November 2025.

=== Foreign policy ===
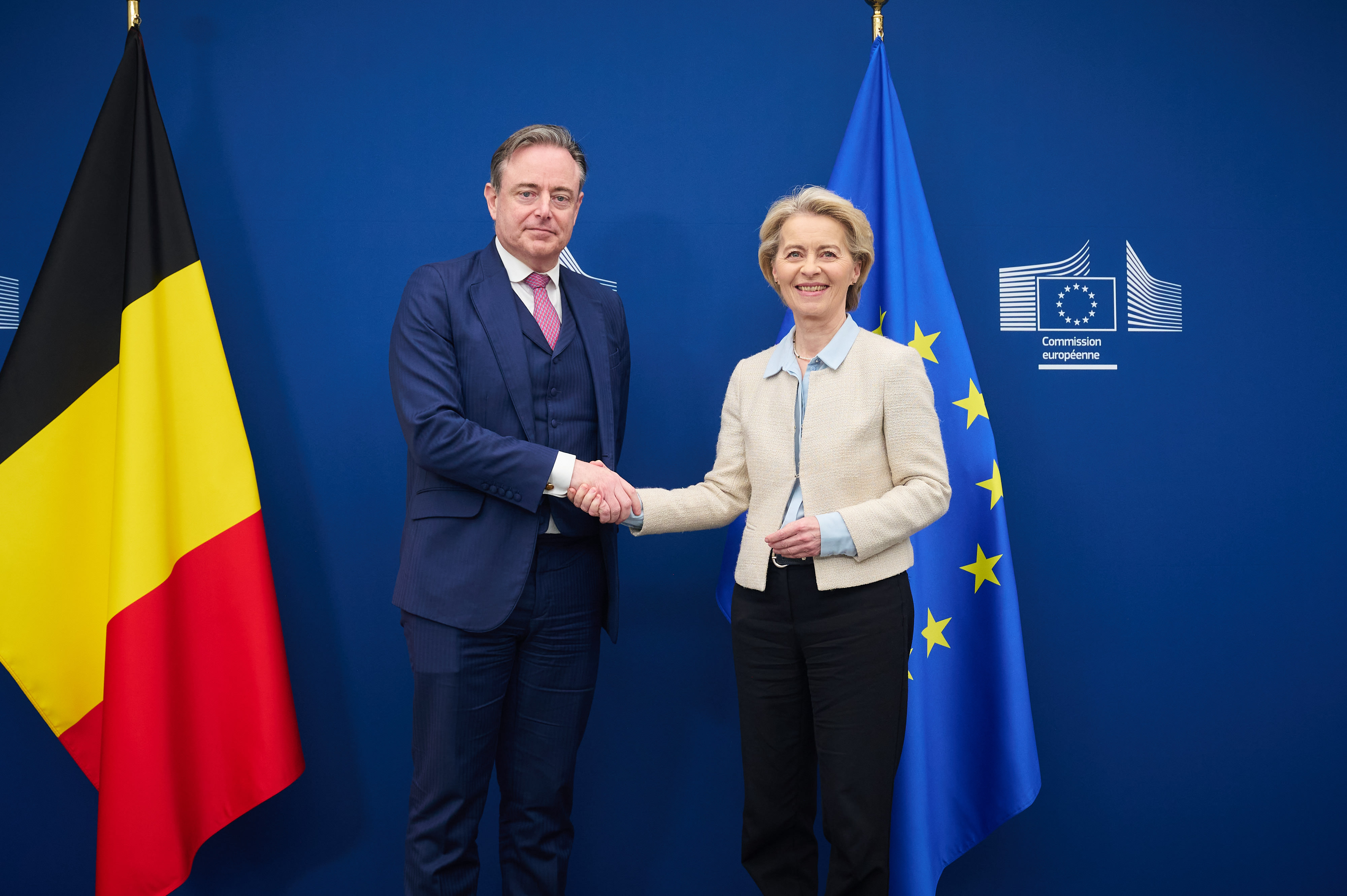
De Wever with President of the European Commission Ursula von der Leyen in Brussels, 17 March 2025

In February 2025, De Wever attended the EU security summit where he affirmed that his government would continue to support Ukraine in the ongoing Russian invasion and increase NATO expenditures, stating "it is our duty to do our part to protect Western society." He was also critical of Donald Trump's approach to Putin and Ukraine, but affirmed he would continue to maintain strong ties with the Trump administration while acknowledging that Belgium and Europe had not met defense spending targets and argued that calls to build a European military alliance without alignment with the United States were unrealistic. In March 2025, De Wever argued against proposals made by other EU leaders to confiscate 200 billion euros worth of frozen Russian assets held by Euroclear, arguing that such a move would be considered an "act of war" by Russia. He furthermore said that European leaders would also pose "systemic risks to the entire financial world system" by publicly calling for the seizure of the frozen Russian assets.

On 20 March 2025, De Wever was invited by Dutch Prime Minister Dick Schoof to a meeting of "migration-realist" European Union leaders. The meeting also included Giorgia Meloni of Italy, Mette Frederiksen of Denmark, as well as representatives from Hungary and Austria. De Wever's attendance marked the first time a Belgian Prime Minister had been invited to the talks. According to press observers, the "migration-realist" club consists of EU leaders who wish to implement similar and stricter immigration policies in their countries and gain more influence over EU decision-making on asylum policy. Their aims include pushing for the EU and European Commission President Ursula von der Leyen to adopt tighter border control measures, such as the construction of migrant "return centres" outside of Europe.

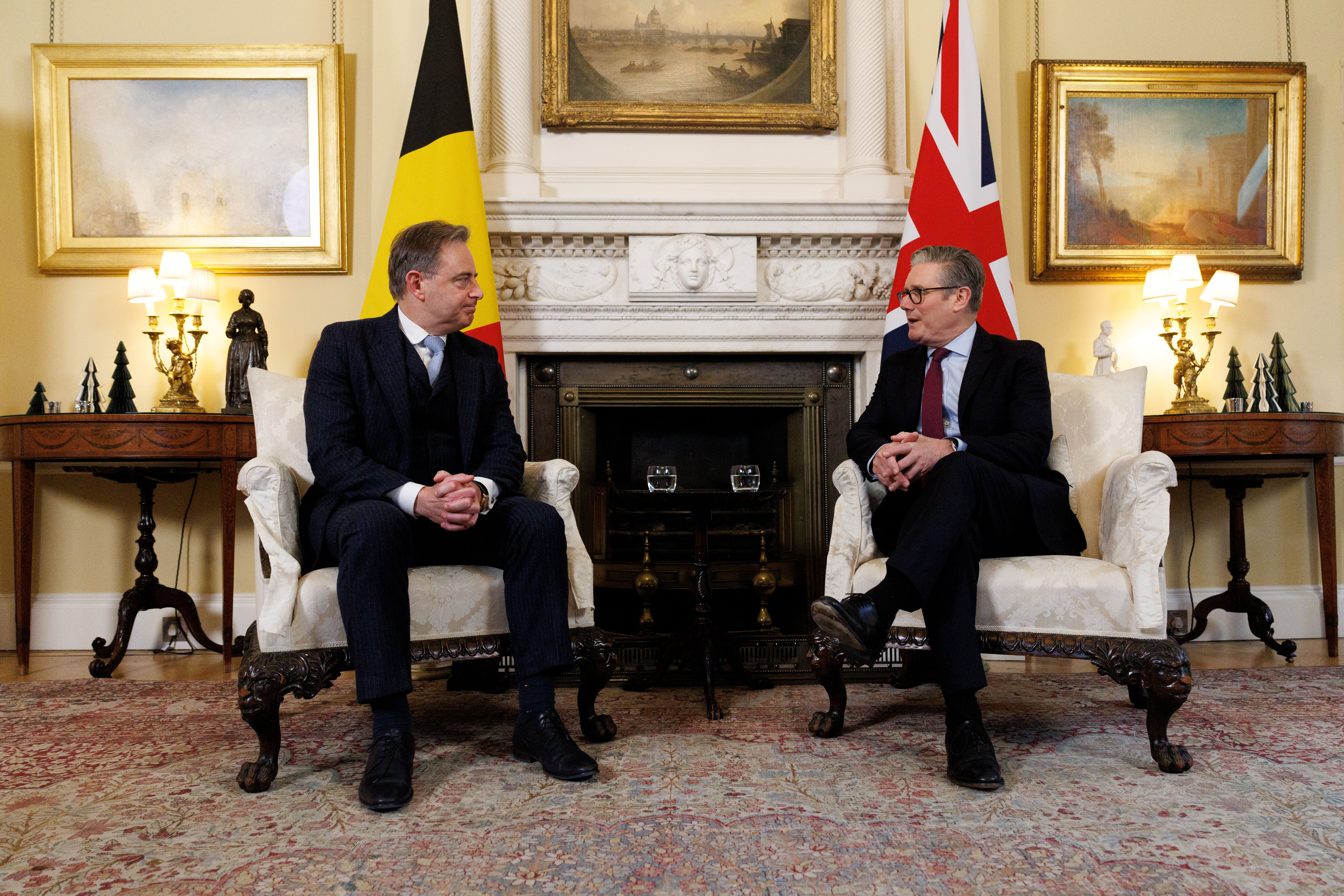
De Wever with British Prime Minister Keir Starmer, 12 December 2025

In response to a question on Hungary's refusal to uphold the arrest warrant of Benjamin Netanyahu by the International Criminal Court, De Wever expressed that "I think we would not do it either", signalling a break with the previous government. Three of the parties in the De Wever government reacted negatively to this statement, and foreign minister Maxime Prévot quickly reassured the ICC that the warrant would be upheld. Eventually, the governing parties came to a resolution in May to uphold the warrant.

Under De Wever's leadership, Belgium expressed its intent to formally recognize Palestinian statehood, a move that led Israeli Prime Minister Benjamin Netanyahu to label him a "weak leader".

On 23 October 2025, at a summit in Brussels with EU leaders and Ukrainian president Volodymyr Zelenskyy, De Wever again resisted EU intentions to seize Russia's frozen assets at a Belgian bank to fund the Ukrainian war effort. He claimed that in the event of a lawsuit Belgium faces the risk of having to repay the entire amount of Russia's assets. De Wever continued in his opposition to the plan in December 2025, saying that "This is money from a country with which we are not at war," as the EU took legal steps towards seizing the Russian funds. On 15 December, the last chance to reach an agreement before the meeting of the European Council, De Wever's government said that the concessions offered by the EU, such as providing Belgium with a €210 billion fund in the event of a lawsuit and having other states guarantee at least half of the frozen assets, were not enough. At the meeting, it was agreed to issue joint debt to finance Ukraine instead of using the frozen assets, and Belgium's position received support from Bulgaria, Italy, and Malta.

At the World Economic Forum in Davos in January 2026, De Wever warned that Europe risks becoming a "miserable slave" to the United States if it does not unite. He accused U.S. President Donald Trump of "crossing red lines," specifically citing threats related to Greenland. After the start of the Israeli–U.S. war against Iran, he suggested in an interview with L'Echo on 16 March 2026 that the EU should seek to normalize relations with Russia, in order to "regain access to cheap energy."

== Ideology and views ==
Politically, De Wever has described himself as a conservative and a Flemish nationalist. He is an avowed admirer of Edmund Burke and his political philosophy, and has described British conservative writer and social critic Theodore Dalrymple, former Prime Minister Margaret Thatcher and Austrian economist Friedrich Hayek as influences. De Wever has also written opinion columns and essays for De Morgen and De Standaard which he published as a book titled The Precious Fabric of Society in 2008.

=== Reunification of the Low Countries ===
In July 2021, during an interview with Trends Talk on Kanaal Z, De Wever said "A confederation of the Low Countries could be a reality the day after tomorrow. If I could die as a Southern Dutchman, I would die happier than as a Belgian," During his premiership, in an interview with radio broadcaster Sven op 1 of WNL on 24 June 2025, De Wever expressed his continued support for the idea of a reunification between Belgium and the Netherlands. According to him "as a politician and a human being, I am convinced that the separation of the Netherlands in the 16th century is the greatest disaster that has ever befallen us." De Wever repeated this opinion during a speech at the 17th EW HJ Schoo-lezing in the Rode Hoed in Amsterdam on 4 September 2025, where he also advocated for closer ties between the Benelux countries.

=== Flemish nationalism ===
During his time as leader of the Flemish nationalist N-VA, De Wever campaigned in favour of gradual Flemish secessionism from Belgium and an independent Flanders within a wider democratic European confederation of sovereign states. In a 2010 interview, he stated "I'm not a revolutionary, and I'm not working toward the immediate end of Belgium" but believed the Belgian state is in a natural process of coming to an end. De Wever has argued that the French-speaking parties, particularly the Socialist Party, have blocked meaningful reforms for the country, and that opposition to financial transfers from Flanders as solidarity to Wallonia has increased Flemish nationalism, and that an independent Flanders would be able to regulate its own taxation and business policies. He has also stated "it's also a matter of our national and cultural identity. Saying that seems outmoded today. The embodiment of the modern age is the 'global citizen', who is as mobile, flexible and rich as possible. In reality, most people are afraid of globalization and are asking themselves the question: Where exactly do I belong? This is no different in Flanders."

De Wever has also spoken in favour of the Greater Netherlands concept in which Flanders and the Netherlands can potentially be united into the same country or under a federal agreement, arguing that Dutch and Flemings are "the same people separated by the same language."

=== Economic policy ===
De Wever also asserts the N-VA as the most liberal of the major Belgian parties on economic issues. He has stressed defense of entrepreneurship as one of the key points of his program, and he is committed to opposing all tax increases and reducing public spending, particularly in the social sphere. De Wever has argued for limits to unemployment benefits over time, abolish early retirement pensions, raise the retirement age and reduce the number of civil servants. He also proposes to transfer certain tax and social security powers to the regions.

As Prime Minister of Belgium, De Wever said he would oppose what he termed as the European Union's "regulatory fervour" and called for reductions in the number of regulations put in place by the EU, arguing that excessive EU regulation stifled economic growth and innovation, as well as hampered both Belgium and Europe's ability to compete globally.

=== Immigration and crime ===
In a 2018 op-ed for De Morgen De Wever wrote that the political left in Belgium had used "a subtle form of moral blackmail" to promote an immigration policy that would lead to "the total degradation of the welfare state." He said that open borders undermines social security and wrote "Politicians must let the general interest prevail over personal conscience, however hard it may be."

When discussing the theft of an ambulance in Antwerp by a gang of youths in a September 2024 interview with broadcaster VRT, De Wever linked Belgium's immigration policies to levels of crime and delinquency, arguing "The source of all the misery seems to me to be our migration policy, where we give many people who have little prospect access to our country." He argued young people of non-European immigrant backgrounds were "the same young people who hang around, intimidate or even sexually harass women, throw firecrackers and come out and act the beast on New Year's Eve." De Wever argued that to tackle the issue, he would introduce mandatory "citizen internships" where young people perform work for the city during high school and a zero tolerance law to prosecute assaulting government employees such as police officers, emergency responders and social workers.

=== Vlaams Belang ===
In Belgian politics, De Wever has expressed criticism of the cordon sanitaire placed on the Vlaams Belang (VB) party, describing it as undemocratic and counterproductive. He was previously critical of its Vlaams Blok predecessor, claiming that he had resisted offers to join the party and in 2010 argued that the radical right-wing populist stances of the Vlaams Blok had harmed the image of the Flemish movement. However, following the 2019 Belgian federal election, De Wever stated that he was considering breaking the Cordon to include the VB as a potential coalition partner. Although De Wever and the N-VA held official talks with the VB in 2019, they ultimately did not form an agreement.

In 2023, De Wever stated that he would rather enter a governing coalition with the VB than with the Workers' Party of Belgium, when asked about the rise of both parties in polls, describing the latter as "communists." In the same interview, De Wever also said that he had previously been hesitant to work with the Vlaams Belang due to the beliefs of certain individuals within the party but he would now form a Flemish nationalist coalition and government with the VB if it distanced itself from extremism. However, that same year De Wever partially retreated from the idea of forming a coalition with the VB, citing his concerns about some of the members of the party and the recent accusation of Chinese espionage scandals with a VB politician.

=== Academic and Media Commentary ===
Writing for the Centre for Political Studies in Brussels in 2010, scholar on Belgian politics Regis Dantoy assessed that De Wever politically positions himself "very ambiguously" between a charismatic populist and a mainstream image as a "popular figure who flirts with populism" in order to attract a wider degree of support. In an interview with Der Spiegel De Wever described himself as opposed to forms of extreme far-right and far-left politics, arguing "I'm conservative by nature and I don't like adventures." Professor of digital media and politics Ico Maly has argued that De Wever's political communication consists of the following ideological components: Flemish nationalism, neoconservatism, counter-enlightenment and cultural homogeny. Philosopher Philippe Van Parijs described him as a civic nationalist instead of an ethnic nationalist, and also questioned if De Wever could still be described as a separatist. Assessing De Wever's ideological views, philosopher Jason Stanley has opined that he is "a master of polite xenophobia" whereas Belgian political scientist Carl Devos argues that De Wever is not xenophobic or populist but takes a firm stance on immigration and asylum policy.

== Personal life ==
De Wever is married to a Dutch national, Veerle Hegge, with whom he has four children. They live together in Deurne. In 2012, De Wever undertook a crash diet and lost 60 kilos. His physical transformation was noted by the Belgian media and he subsequently published a book advising on weight loss. De Wever has cited marathon running as his main interest outside of politics. In addition to Dutch, De Wever speaks French, English and German.

In August 2025, De Wever adopted a Scottish Fold cat, which he named Maximus Textoris Pulcher and announced as an official resident of the prime minister's office at Rue de la Loi 16. Maximus has a popular account on Instagram.

== Written works ==
De Wever's written works are listed at his entry on the Encyclopedia of the Flemish Movement.

- De Wever, Bart (1995). Herrijzenis van de Vlaams-nationalistische partijpolitiek (1949-1965). Het arrondissement Antwerpen [Resurrection of Flemish nationalist party politics (1949-1965). The arrondissement of Antwerp] (Unpublished master's thesis). KUL.
- ———————; De Wever, Bruno (1999). "Groot-Nederland als utopie en voorwendsel" [Greater Netherlands as utopia and pretense]. In Deprez, Kas; Vos, Louis (eds.). Nationalisme in België: identiteiten in beweging 1780-2000. Antwerp: Houtekiet. pp. 146–159.
- ——————— (2008). Het kostbare weefsel: vijf jaar maatschappijkritiek [The precious fabric: five years of social criticism]. Kapellen: Pelckmans.
- ———————; Dalrymple, Theodore (2011). Vrijheid en oprechtheid [Freedom and uprightness]. Kapellen: Pelckmans.
- ——————— (2011). Werkbare waarden: een vervolg op Het kostbare weefsel [Functional values: a sequel to The precious fabric]. Kapellen: Pelckmans.
- ——————— (2013). Derrière le miroir [Behind the mirror] (in French). Translated by Préaux, Céline. Brussels: Le Cri.
- ——————— (2019). Over identiteit [On identity]. Gent: Borgerhoff & Lamberigts.
- ———————; Imbo, Lisbeth; Benhaddou, Khalid (2021). Botsen de beschavingen?: 20 jaar na 9/11 nog altijd het noorden kwijt [Do civilizations clash?: still lost 20 years after 9/11]. Kapellen: Pelckmans.
- ——————— (2023). Over Woke [On Woke]. Gent: Borgerhoff & Lamberigts.
  - ——————— (2023). Woke (in French). Kennes.
- ———————; Vermant, Johan (2023). Het verhaal van Antwerpen [The story of Antwerp]. Kapellen: Pelckmans.

== Honours ==
Foreign

- Japan: Grand Cordon of the Order of the Rising Sun (23 June 2026)

== See also ==
- List of current heads of state and government
- List of heads of the executive by approval rating

Party political offices
Preceded by Geert Bourgeois	President of the New Flemish Alliance; 2004–2025	Succeeded by Steven Vandeput; Acting
Political offices
Preceded by Patrick Janssens	Mayor of Antwerp; 2013–2025	Succeeded by Els van Doesburg; Acting
Preceded by Alexander De Croo	Prime Minister of Belgium; 2025–present	Incumbent
