= Craeybeckx Tunnel =

Road tunnel in Antwerp, Belgium

Coordinates: 51.1803°N 4.4158°E

Craeybeckx tunnel
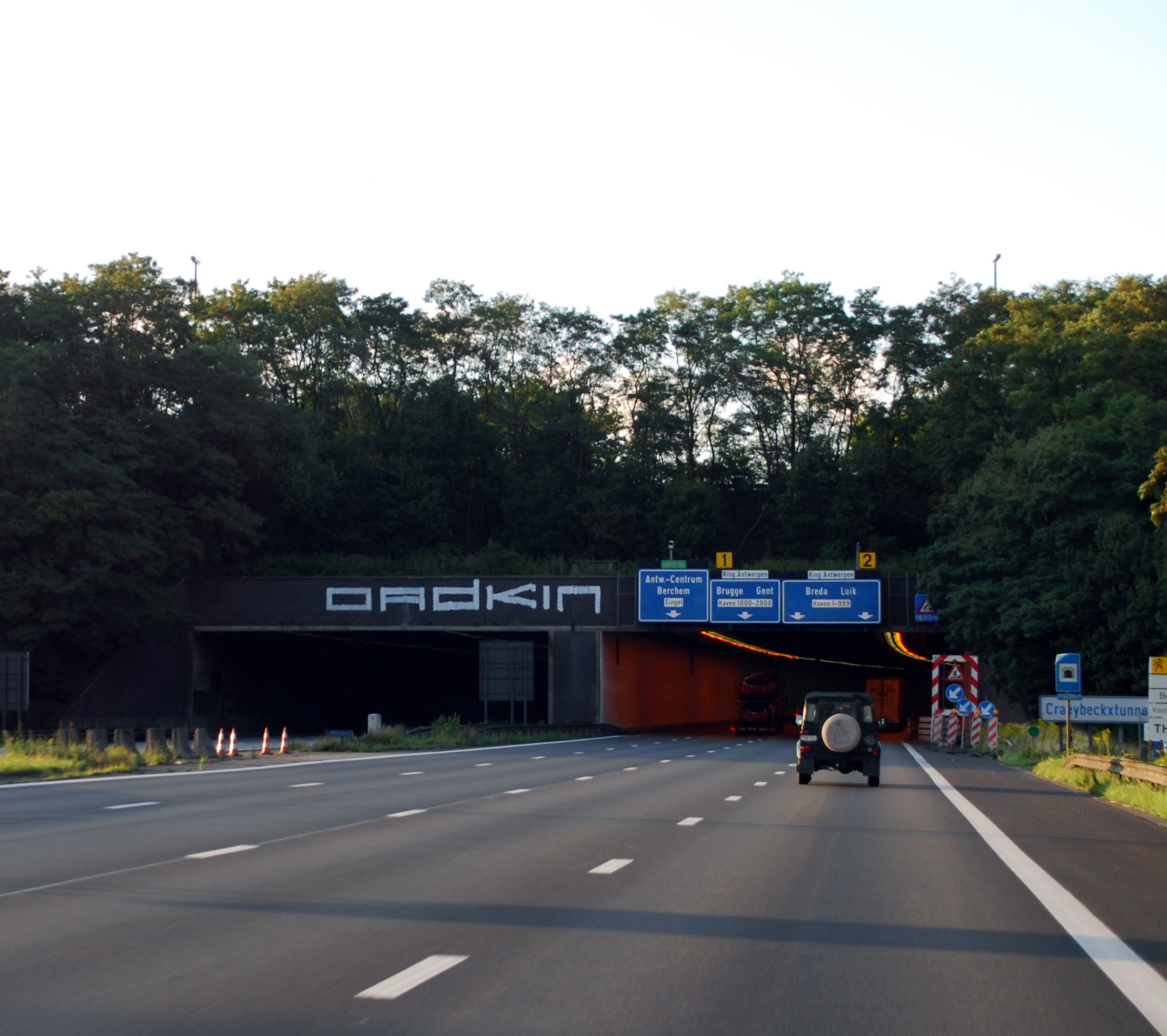

Overview
- Status: In use
- Route: A1 (E19)

Operation
- Opened: 1981
- Traffic: cars
- Toll: no

Technical
- Length: 1600 m
- No. of lanes: 4 (per tube)

The Craeybeckx tunnel (in Dutch Craeybeckxtunnel and fully Lode Craeybeckxtunnel) is a road tunnel in Antwerp built in 1981 to reduce the noise from the traffic, for the benefit of the Sint-Augustinus hospital and the Middelheim hospital. The tunnel is 1600 m long and is the widest in Belgium. The construction is named after Lode Craeybeckx, the mayor of Antwerp between 1947 and 1976. Approximately 120.000 vehicles pass the tunnel every day.
