= Victor Desguin =

Belgian politician (1838–1919)

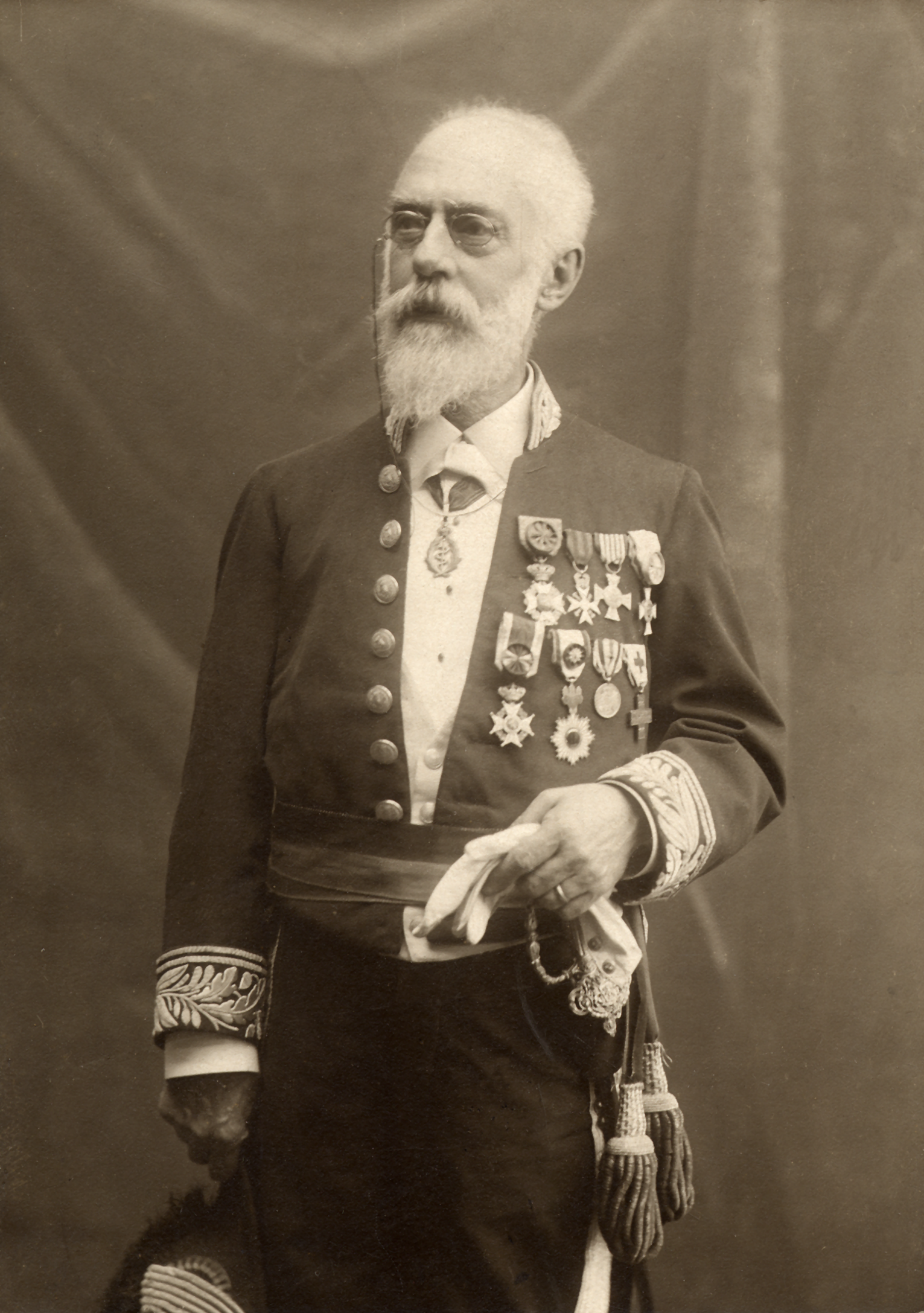
- Born: 30 January 1838; Mariembourg, Belgium
- Died: 8 July 1919 (aged 81); Antwerp, Belgium
- Occupation: politician

Victor Desguin (French: [desgɛ̃]; 30 January 1838 – 8 July 1919) was a Belgian liberal politician.

He was a popular alderman of the city of Antwerp in charge of education and municipal schools at the end of the 19th century. He was twice acting mayor of Antwerp, but was never appointed mayor of the city.

Desguin was born on 30 January 1838. He became alderman of the city of Antwerp in 1892, responsible for education and schooling. He built libraries and schools.

He became acting mayor in 1906, when mayor Jan Van Rijswijck withdrew from office due to illness. Desguin was a member of the liberal party, and because of this, the Catholic government did not want him appointed as mayor. Instead Peter Hertogs became mayor.

When Peter Hertogs died in office in 1908, Desguin became acting mayor again, and for the second time somebody else became mayor instead of him. Jan De Vos was appointed mayor.

During the chaotic days of October 1914, Desguin organised the Antwerpsch Komiteit voor Hulp (Antwerp Relief Committee), a relief organisation for war victims.

Desguin never got the opportunity of becoming mayor; he died on 8 July 1919.

== See also ==
- Liberal Party

== Sources ==
- Victor Desguin (GvA)
