= List of encyclopedias in Dutch =

This is a list of encyclopedias in the Dutch language.

Printed (paper)
Digital (online)
Both*

*This usually means that volumes of the encyclopaedia were originally printed on paper, but at some point (usually in the 1990s or early 2000s), the encyclopaedia has been digitised and made available in whole or in part in electronic form (usually online, but not necessarily). New entries may or may not be added, while old entries (originally printed) may or may not be updated. Usually, publication of paper-printed editions has been discontinued.

Title in Dutch	Title in English	Published
Winkler Prins / Encarta	Winkler Prins / Encarta	1870–1993 (print); 1993–2009 (CD-ROM/DVD)
Oosthoek's Geïllustreerde Encyclopaedie	Oosthoek's Illustrated Encyclopaedia	1907–1981
Christelijke Encyclopedie	Christian Encyclopaedia	1926–2005
Comiclopedia	Comiclopedia	1999–present
Eerste Nederlandse Systematisch Ingerichte Encyclopaedie (ENSIE)	First Dutch Systematically Arranged Encyclopaedia	1946–1952
Encyclopedie van Friesland	Encyclopaedia of Friesland	1958
Standaard Encyclopedie	Standaard Encyclopaedia	1969–1974
Grote Nederlandse Larousse Encyclopedie	Great Dutch Larousse Encyclopedia	1971–1979
Grote Spectrum Encyclopedie	Great Spectrum Encyclopedia	1974–1980
Nederlandstalige Wikipedia	Dutch Wikipedia	2001–present
Encyclopedie van de Vlaamse Beweging	Encyclopedia of the Flemish Movement	1975–present
