= Taco Scheltema =

Dutch painter (1766–1837)

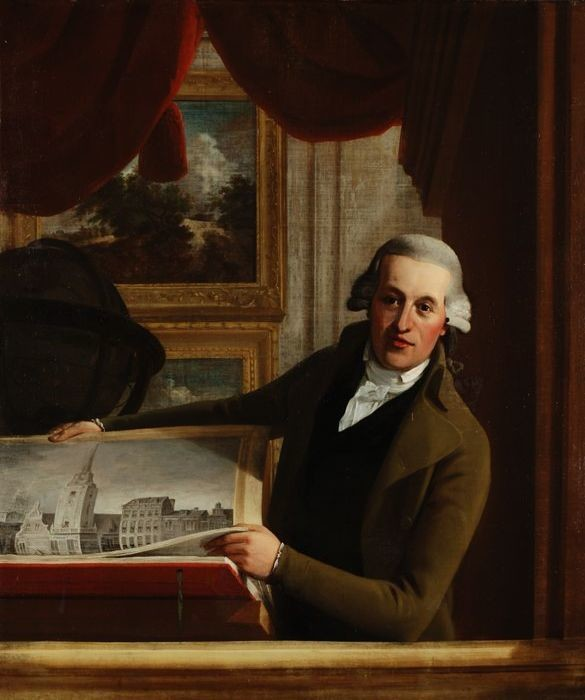
Portrait of the artist Gerrit van der Pals (1742–1839)

Taco Scheltema, or Take Pieters Scheltema (16 August 1766 – 7 September 1837) was a Dutch portrait painter.

== Biography ==
He was born in Harlingen as the son of an innkeeper named Pieter Scheltes Scheltema (1702–1771). After a short time in Amsterdam, studying drawing and painting with the portrait and landscape painter Pleun Piera (1734–1799), he qualified for admission to the Kunstakademie Düsseldorf. Upon graduation, he travelled through Saxony and Holland; eventually settling in Rotterdam in 1794, where he had been commissioned to paint the founders and administrators of the Batavian Society for Experimental Philosophy.

He ultimately established his studio in Arnhem and, throughout his career, mostly focused on family paintings. In 1799 he married Jacomina van Nijmegen (1768–1825), with whom he had five children.

He died in 1837 in Arnhem. His descendants included several other artists; notably his grandson, Taco Jan Scheltema (1831–1867), who is represented in the Louvre, as well as Jan Hendrik Scheltema (1861–1941) and Leendert Scheltema (1876–1966), who specialized in landscapes.

== Sources ==
- A. Staring, "Een vergeten Portrettist: Taco Scheltema", in: Oud-Holland, #54 (1937), pgs. 193–213.
- Nederland's Patriciaat, #27 (1941), pgs. 218–288.
- J. H. Brouwer (ed.), Encyclopedie van Friesland, Elsevier 1958
