= Defoort =

Defoort is a surname. Notable people with the surname include:

- André Defoort (1914–1972), Belgian racing cyclist
- Eric Defoort (1943–2016), Flemish Belgian politician and president of the European Free Alliance
- Kris Defoort, Belgian avant-garde jazz pianist and composer
