= Anthony van Stralen, Lord of Merksem =

Belgian politician

Anthony van Stralen Lord of Merksem
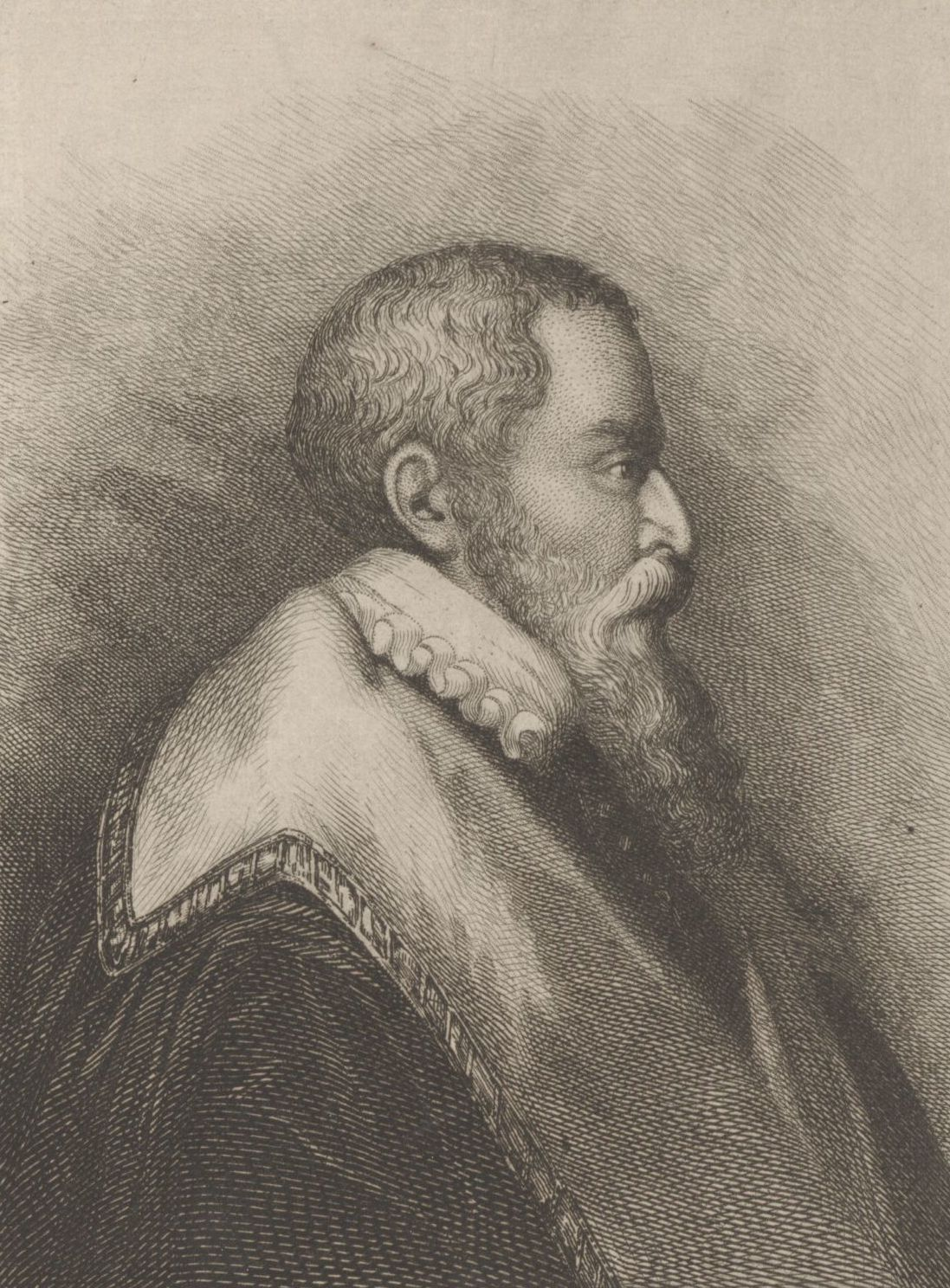

Mayor of Antwerp
- Monarch: Felipe II of Spain

Lord of Merksem
- Preceded by: Anna Draeck

Personal details
- Born: 1521
- Died: 24 September 1568 (aged 46–47) Vilvoorde
- Spouse: Mathilde van Straelen

Anthony van Stralen (1521 - executed, Vilvoorde, 24 September 1568), Lord of Merksem, Lord of Dambrugghe was a Mayor of Antwerp. Although he was Roman Catholic, he became a famous victim of the terror of the Duke of Alva.

== Family ==
He was the son of Goswin von Straelen, born in Cologne and Anna Draeck, Lady of Merksem. His grandfather was the major Willem Draeck, Lord of Merksem. His wife's sister, Mathilde, was married to Melchior I Schetz, lord of Rumpst and treasurer of Antwerp. He was related to Isabella van Stralen (1577-1660), known as Isabel de Jesús Christo.

== Career ==
He became Lord of Merksem on 23 September 1561. Van Stralen was mayor of Antwerp from 1555 to 1557, in 1561 and in 1565. After the Iconoclastic Fury he became a refugee in Germany. The Duke of Alva ordered his arrest. He was a friend and correspondent of William the Silent, and the Spanish government suspected him of treason. His letters were confiscated by the Count of Lodron.

In 1565 he acquired his main residence, Huysinge de Groote Robijn. After his execution his complete fortune, 400,000 guilders and the lordship, were forfeited to the Spanish Crown.

== Execution ==
The duke of Alba waited with his arrest until Horne was back in Brussels. Van Stralen never left Antwerpen, he was convinced that his contact with Oranje was official on request of the City. Lord van Stralen was arrested in 1567 during a "fake" dinner with Don Ferdinand, Alba's son. Alba ordered his arrest and Lord van Stralen stood trial; afterward, with permission from Alba he was subject to extreme torture. The city of Antwerp protested his execution, in panic many merchants left the city in fear of the duke of Alva. An official delegation went to the duke to beg for the freedom of Lord van Stralen. He was executed after a trial before the Council of Troubles. After being tortured he was beheaded on 24 September 1568 in Vilvoorde, together with John of Casembroodt, Lord of Backerzele, and Alfons de La Loi, secretary to the Count of Horne.

In 1885 a painting of him by Auguste Delfosse was hung in the mayor's office.
