= Patrick Janssens =

Belgian politician (born 1956)

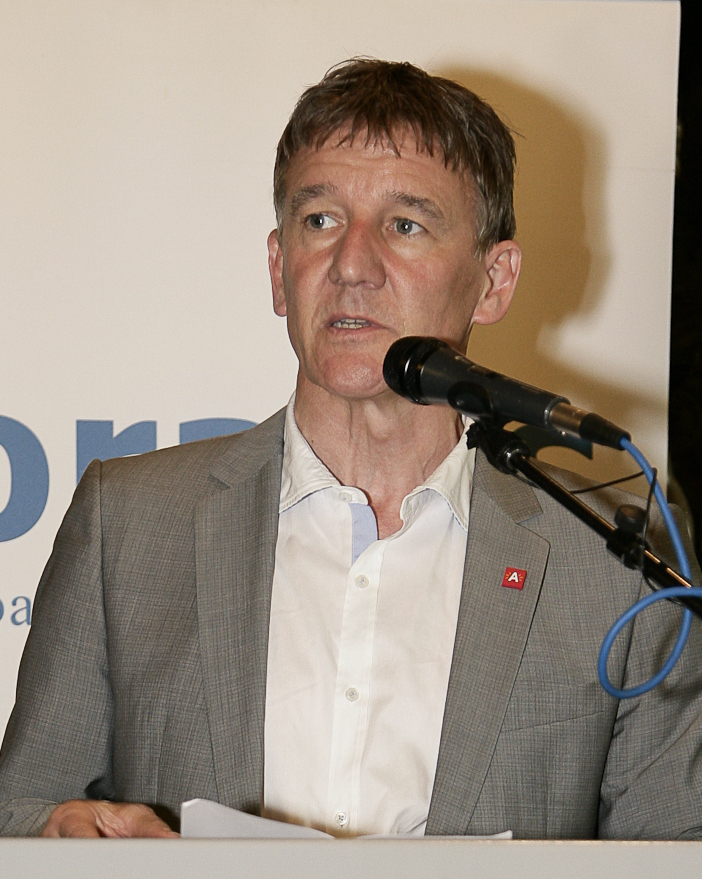
- Janssens in 2012

Member of the Flemish Parliament
- In office 13 June 2004 – 24 May 2014

Member of the Chamber of Representatives
- In office 18 May 2003 – 6 July 2004

Mayor of Antwerp
- In office 10 July 2003 – 31 December 2012
- Preceded by: Leona Detiège
- Succeeded by: Bart De Wever

Personal details
- Born: Patrick Janssens; 19 September 1956 (age 70) Antwerp, Belgium
- Party: SP.A
- Education: Antwerp University; London School of Economics
- Occupation: Politician
- Website: Official website

Patrick Janssens (born 19 September 1956) is a Belgian former politician. He was a member of the SP.a and the former mayor of the port city Antwerp.

== Career ==
Janssens studied "Political and Social Sciences" and "Applied Economic Sciences" (both Masters) at the University of Antwerp and Statistics at the London School of Economics. From 1979 to 1985 he was an assistant in the Department of Sociology and Social Policy at the University of Antwerp, first of Jan Vranken (with whom he wrote the first National Report on Poverty in Belgium, within the framework of the First European Anti-Poverty Programme) and then of Herman Deleeck.

From 1985 to 1989, he ran a market research agency (Dimarso) after which he undertook several positions at the marketing agency VVL/BBDO until 1999.

In 1999, he was appointed president of the Socialist Party. He resigned as president to become mayor of Antwerp in 2003. In the general election held the same year, Janssens was elected to the Belgian Chamber of People's Representatives but he left the Chamber one year later when the 2004 regional elections saw Janssens becoming a member of the Flemish Parliament. In the municipal elections of 2006, he was overwhelmingly elected for another term as mayor.

He was longlisted for the 2008 World Mayor award.

Janssens lost the 2012 municipal elections to Bart De Wever of the N-VA.

On 25 August 2014, he became general director of football club KRC Genk but was succeeded by Erik Gerits on 9 February 2018, and on 2 January he was elected councilman in the De Wever Government.

In January 2021, suspected of forgery , he was one of the fifty Belgian football personalities involved in the "Footbelgate" whose referral to the Antwerp Criminal Court was requested by the federal prosecutor's office.

In 2022, Janssens faced forgery accusations as part of Operation Clean Hands during his tenure as CEO of KRC Genk.

After being elected and with the management agreement between Vooruit and N-VA finalized, he was appointed alderman for Housing and Urban Development on 2 January 2025.

Preceded by Leona Detiège	Mayor of Antwerp; 10 July 2003 – 31 December 2012	Succeeded by Bart De Wever
