= Peter De Roover =

Belgian politician (born 1962)

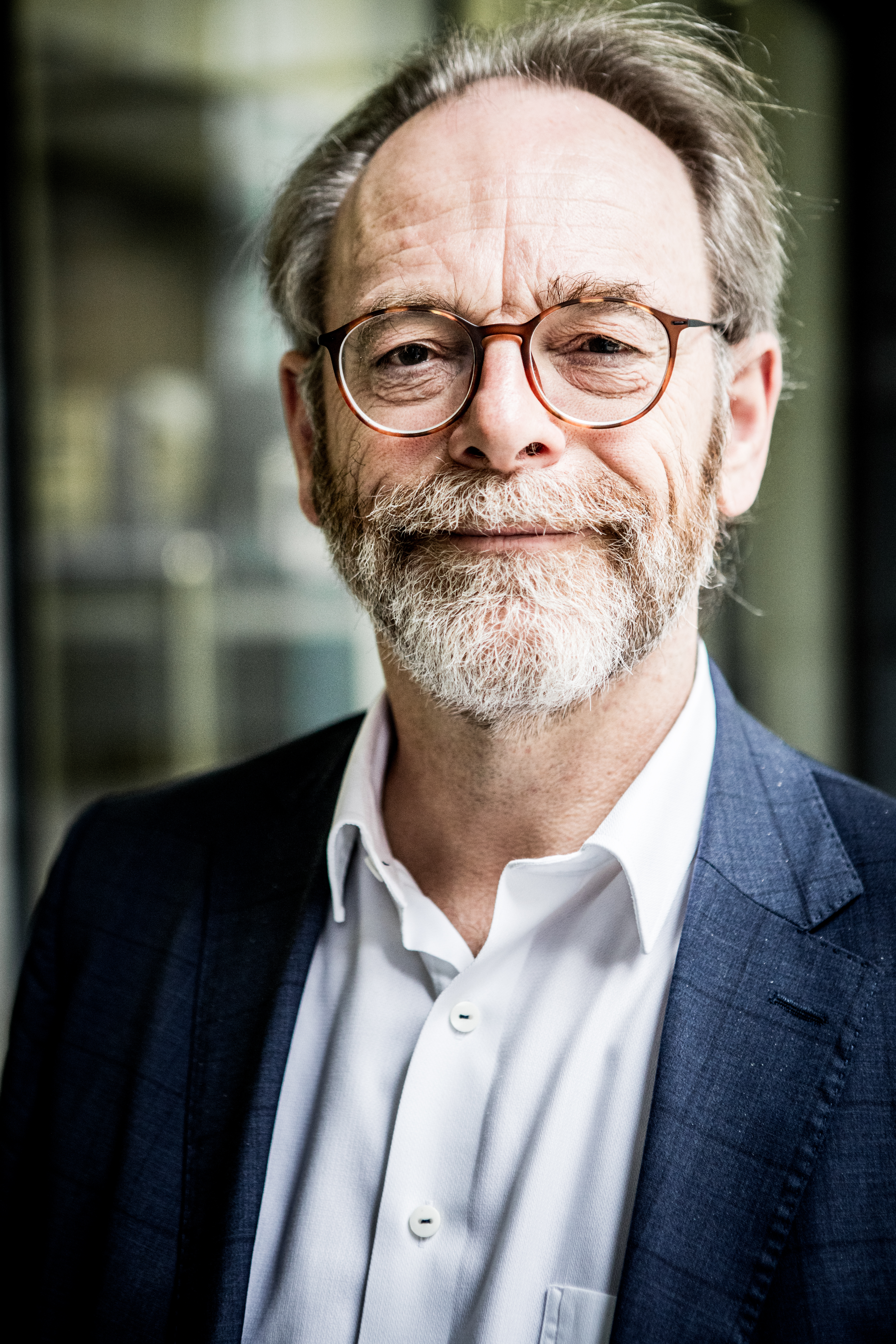
- De Roover in 2024

President of the Chamber of Representatives
- Incumbent
- Assumed office 10 July 2024
- Preceded by: Eliane Tillieux

Member of the Chamber of Representatives
- Incumbent
- Assumed office 19 June 2014

Personal details
- Born: Peter De Roover; 20 May 1962 (age 64) Turnhout, Belgium
- Party: N-VA (2014–present)
- Other political affiliations: VU (until 1988)
- Domestic partner(s): Els van Doesburg (2021–present)
- Children: 2
- Education: University of Antwerp
- Occupation: Economy teacher • Politician

Peter De Roover (born 20 May 1962) is a Belgian politician, economist, journalist and former broadcaster and a member of the Flemish nationalist New Flemish Alliance party.

De Roover was elected as a member of the Belgian Chamber of Representatives in 2014 for the Antwerp constituency. He serves as the N-VA's faction leader in the Federal Parliament and has served as President of the Chamber of Representatives since July 2024.

== Biography ==
=== Early career ===
Peter De Roover was born in Turnhout. Between 1980 and 1984, he studied economics at the Saint Ignatius University Centre, Antwerp (UFSIA), where he was involved in the Flemish nationalist Nationalistische Studentenvereniging (NSV) and the conservative Katholiek Vlaams Hoogstudentenverbond (KVHV). During this time, he also contributed as an editor to the KVHV publication Tegenstroom.

After completing his studies, De Roover worked as a secondary school economics teacher, first at Sint-Aloysius in Mortsel, and later at Sint-Eligiuscollege in Antwerp.

De Roover became politically active through VUJO, the youth organization of the former Volksunie (VU). In 1988, he left the party due to ideological disagreements and internal tensions between left- and right-wing factions. The following year, he co-founded the Antwerp chapter of the Vlaamse Volksbeweging (VVB) alongside Jan Jambon.

In the 1990s, De Roover shifted his focus to journalism. He began contributing a finance column to the Flemish cultural and political magazine Doorbraak in 1999 and was appointed editor-in-chief in 2013. In 2001, he founded the conservative publication Point. Over the years, he also worked as a columnist and reporter for newspapers such as De Standaard, De Morgen, and Knack, and served as a presenter on the current affairs programme Terzake broadcast by VRT.

=== Political career ===
In 2014, he ran for the Belgian Federal Parliament for the N-VA party and was elected to the Chamber of Representatives for the Antwerp constituency. In 2015, he was appointed treasurer of the party and in 2016 resigned from this role to become the N-VA's group leader and spokesman in the Chamber.

During the Michel I Government in which the N-VA provided support to the government of Charles Michel, De Roover was known for his outspoken opposition to the government on certain policies. In 2018, he attracted attention for his stance against the Belgian government in signing the UN Migration Pact which was supported by all parties in the cabinet apart from the N-VA. The N-VA subsequently withdrew their support to the government after the treaty was adopted triggering the collapse of the Michel I' cabinet. In the 2024 Belgian federal election De Roover ran as the list pusher for the Antwerp constituency and was again elected to parliament. In 2024, he was elected President of the Chamber.

De Roover has campaigned for the Armenian genocide to be formally recognised by both the Belgian government and international community. In 2023, he was awarded the Mkhitar Gosh Medal for his work on supporting the rights of Armenian minority communities and recognition of the genocide.

== Personal life ==
De Roover is in a relationship with fellow N-VA politician Els van Doesburg whom he became engaged to in November 2021. In January 2025 she announced her first pregnancy. He has an adult son from a previous relationship.
