= Frans Detiège =

Belgian politician (1909–1980)

Andreas Frans Theodoor Detiège (Antwerp, 22 December 1909 – 1 November 1980) was a Belgian politician for the social democratic Belgian Socialist Party, a Federal Representative (1947–1974) and Mayor of Antwerp (1976), after he had been Antwerp's Alderman responsible for Social Affairs (1947–1976) in the municipal government of mayor Lode Craeybeckx.

His daughter, Leona Detiège, also served as Antwerp's mayor and as a Federal Senator, while his granddaughter, Maya Detiège, also served as a Federal Representative.

Detiège held a degree Licentiaat Handelswetenschappen (equivalent to a Master of Business Administration) and studied at the Handelshogeschool, a college now integrated in University of Antwerp.

From 1930–1947. Detiège was a journalist at the socialist daily national newspaper Volksgazet.

After being an active party member in the socialist movement and in the party, he was elected to Belgian Chamber of Representatives in 1946, and stayed in office until 1974.

While in the Chamber of Representatives, Detiège also became Alderman for Social Affairs (1947–1976), during the nearly 30 years of the mayoralty of Lode Craeybeckx in the city of Antwerp and in that capacity he was one of the most politically influential architects of post-war Antwerp.

From December 1971 to March 1974, he was a member of the Cultural Council for the Dutch-speaking Cultural Community, predecessor of the Flemish Parliament.

When Craeybeckx in 1976, Detiège became mayor, but didn't stand for re-election at the end of the year.

Detiège was responsible for the destruction of nearly 5,000 inhabitable houses (hovels), unfortunately also some historically valuable houses (that were considered beyond restoration). He was promoted large scale social housing projects, sports and recreation facilities, a modern hospital, an open air museum for modern art and a new Municipal Slaughterhouse. Detiège modernised the public waste collection service and started a network of medical baby dispensaries, nurseries and pre-infant schools.
