= Bruno De Wever =

Belgian historian (born 1960)

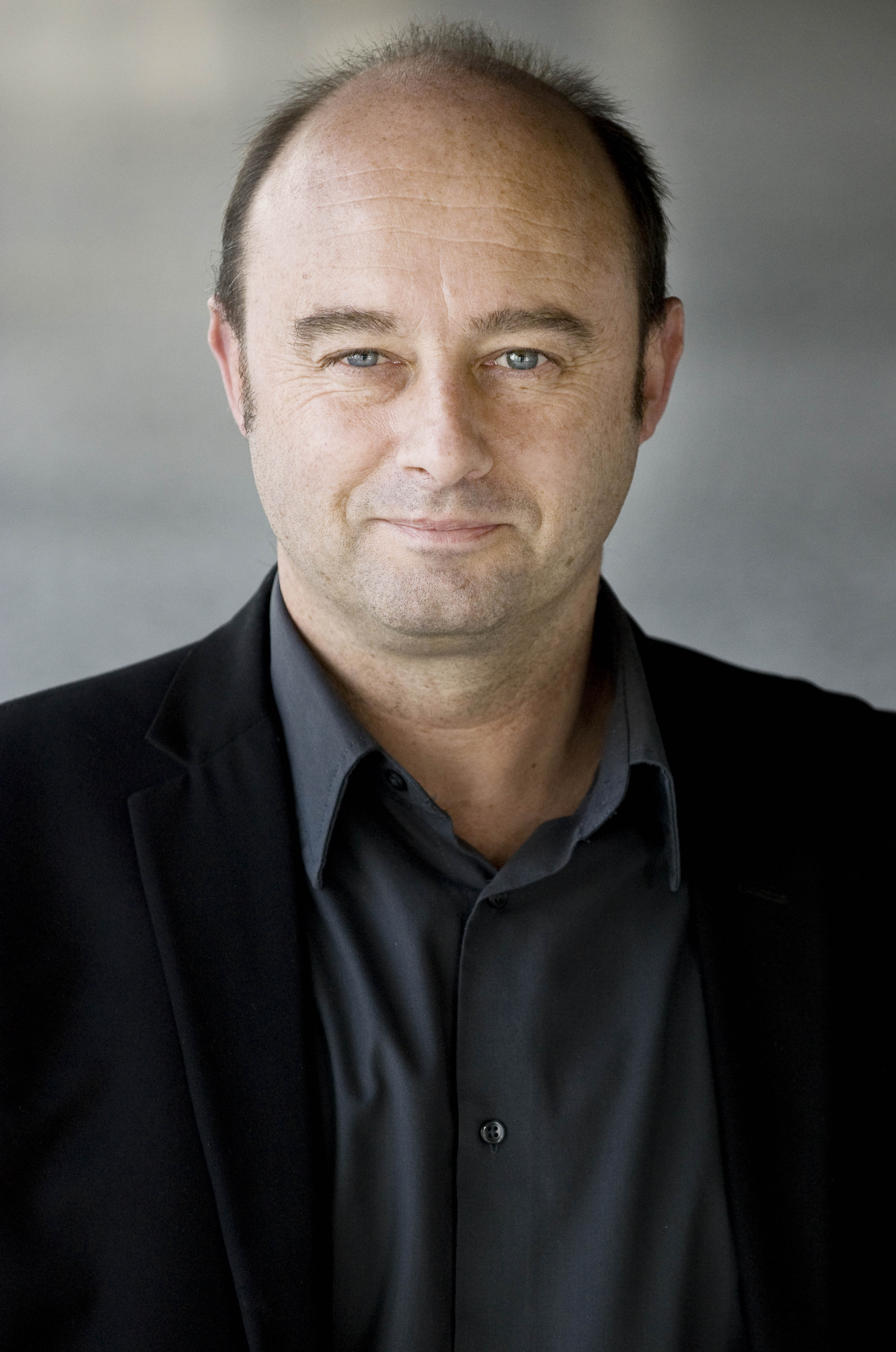
- De Wever in 2011
- Born: February 20, 1960 (age 65); Mortsel, Belgium

Academic work
- Discipline: History
- Sub-discipline: Flemish movement; World War II

Bruno De Wever (born 20 February 1960) is a Belgian historian who specializes in the history of Flemish nationalism and of World War II. Since the 1980s, he has weighed in on the debate surrounding the war in Flanders. His younger brother Bart has been incumbent prime minister of Belgium since 2025.
