= Rugbyclub Diabolos =

Belgian rugby union club, based in Schilde

Coordinates: 51.26986600218114°N 4.560437266317734°E

- Nickname: Diabolos (Devils)
- Founded: 1991; 35 years ago
- Location: Schilde, Belgium
- Ground: Moerstraat 55, Schilde
- Chairman: Joep De Roeck
- Coach: Rony Lauwers
Team kit

Rugbyclub Diabolos is a Belgian rugby club in Schilde, founded in 1991. The club is affiliated to the Belgian Rugby Federation through its flemish branch Rugby Vlaanderen.

The first teams, both men´s and women´s, played in 2022-2023 in the Belgian third division (D2). The club also has a Mixar team including players with different abilities.
