= Mathilde Schroyens =

Belgian politician (1912–1996)

- Born: 28 December 1912; Mortsel
- Died: 27 February 1996 (aged 83); Antwerp
- Occupation: politician
- Known for: mayor of Antwerp
- Spouse: Etienne Groesser

Mathilde Joséphina Schroyens (28 December 1912 – 27 February 1996) was a Belgian politician associated with the Belgian Socialist Party and subsequently the Parti Socialiste. She was mayor of Antwerp from 1977 to 1982.

The daughter of Fons Schroyens, she was born in Mortsel. At the age of fifteen, she began studying to be a preschool teacher. From 1932 to 1940, she taught at a Jewish school in Antwerp. During World War II, she returned to further study at the École ouvrière supérieure in Brussels to become a social worker. In 1949, she was elected to the Belgium Chamber of Representatives, becoming the first Dutch-speaking socialist woman in the chamber, representing Antwerp province until she failed in her bid for reelection in 1971. She served on the municipal council for Antwerp from 1952 to 1982. She was elected mayor in 1977. After she left the council, she worked as a social worker.

In 1945, she married Etienne Groesser; he died in 1977.

She died in Antwerp at the age of 83.

Political offices
Preceded by Lode Craeybeckx	Mayor of Antwerp; 1977–1982	Succeeded by Bob Cools
