= Schilde =

- Municipality
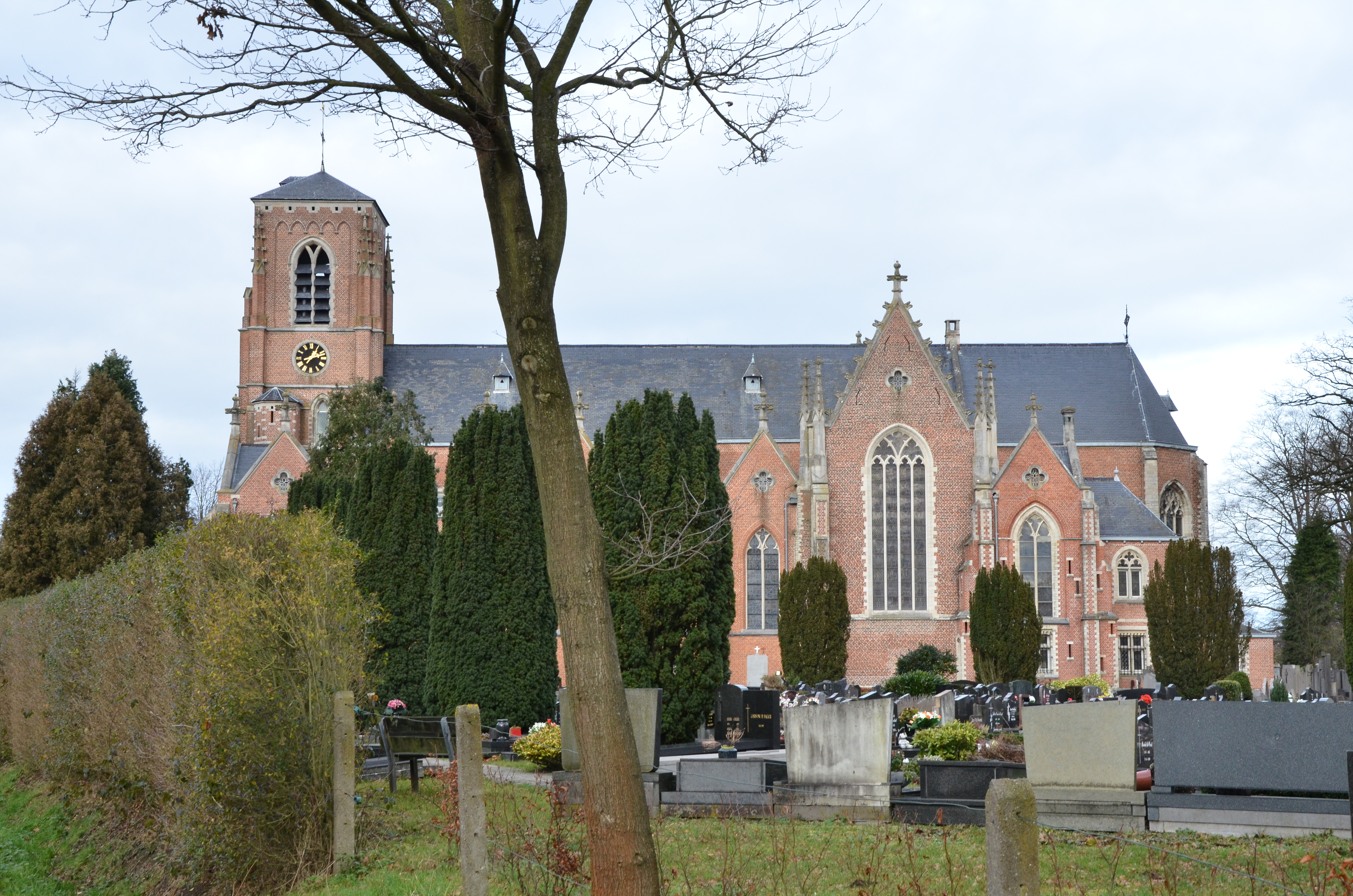
- Sint-Guibertus church

- Flag Coat of arms

- Location of Schilde in the province of Antwerp
- Interactive map of Schilde
- Location in Belgium
- Coordinates: 51°14′N 04°34′E
- Country: Belgium
- Community: Flemish Community
- Region: Flemish Region
- Province: Antwerp
- Arrondissement: Antwerp

Government
  - Mayor: Dirk Bauwens (N-VA)
  - Governing parties: N-VA, OpenVLD

Area
  - Total: 36.09 km^{2} (13.93 sq mi)

Population (2018-01-01)
  - Total: 19,585
  - Density: 542.7/km^{2} (1,406/sq mi)
- Postal codes: 2970
- NIS code: 11039
- Area codes: 03
- Website: www.schilde.be

Schilde (Dutch pronunciation: [ˈsxɪldə]) is a municipality located in the Belgian province of Antwerp. The municipality comprises the towns of Schilde proper and 's-Gravenwezel. In 2021, Schilde had a total population of 19,925. The total area is 35.99 km^{2}. It has one of the highest per capita income levels in Flanders. Schilde is home to Rugbyclub Diabolos.

== Notable people ==
- Els van Doesburg (born 1989), Mayor of Antwerp
