= Els van Doesburg =

Dutch-Belgian politician (born 1989)

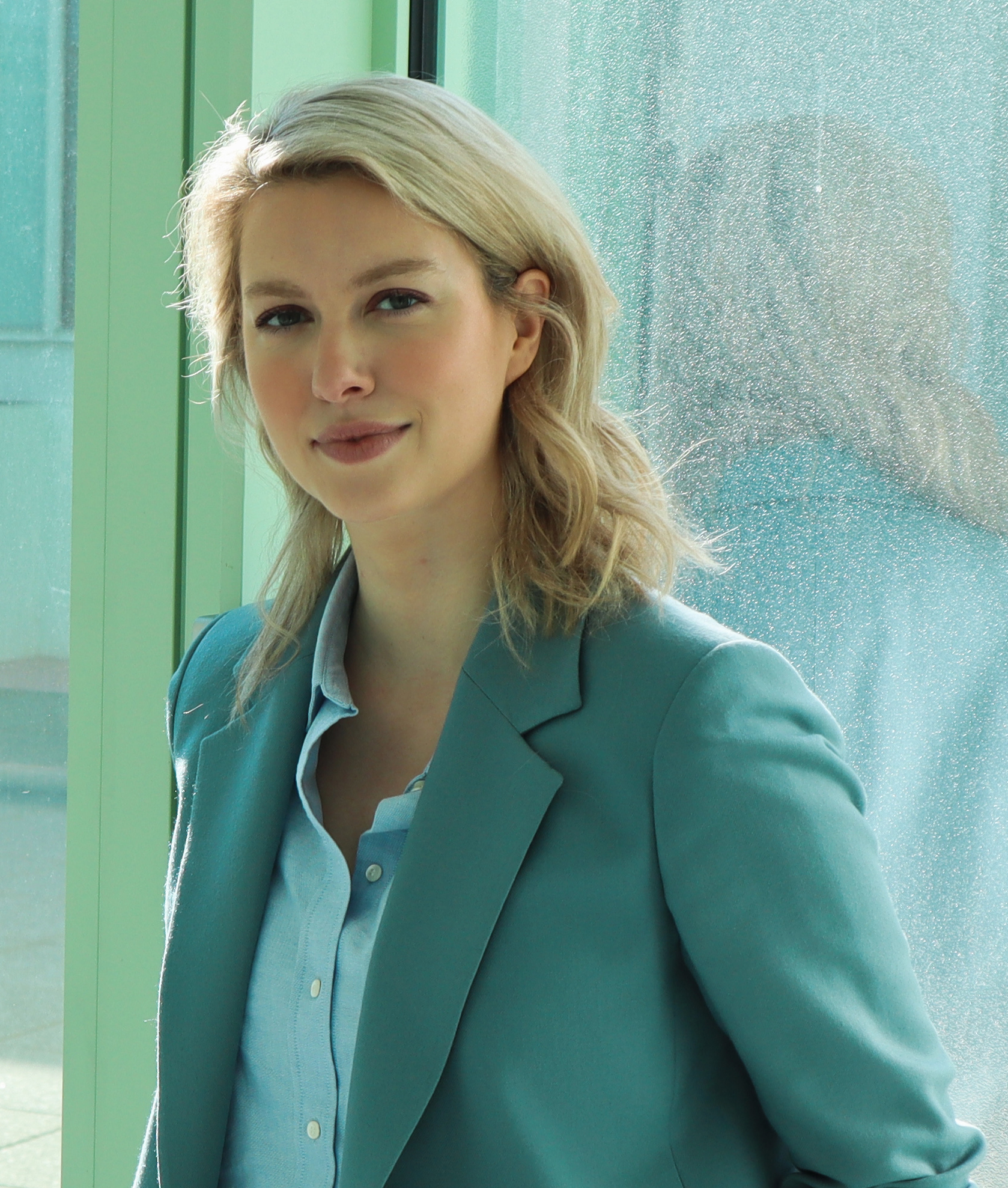
- Van Doesburg in 2022

Acting Mayor of Antwerp
- Incumbent
- Assumed office 3 February 2025
- Preceded by: Bart De Wever

Member of the Flemish Parliament
- Incumbent
- Assumed office 9 June 2024
- Constituency: Antwerp Province

Member of the Antwerp City Council
- Incumbent
- Assumed office 14 October 2018

Personal details
- Born: Elisabeth van Doesburg; 24 May 1989 (age 37) Soest, Netherlands
- Citizenship: Belgium • Netherlands
- Party: New Flemish Alliance
- Domestic partner(s): Peter De Roover (2021–present)
- Children: 1
- Education: University of Antwerp

Elisabeth "Els" van Doesburg (born 24 May 1989) is a Dutch-Belgian politician of the New Flemish Alliance (N-VA) party who has served as the acting mayor of Antwerp since 2025 and as a member of the Flemish Parliament since 2024 for the Antwerp constituency.

== Biography ==
Van Doesburg was born in Soest, Netherlands (Province of Utrecht) and moved to the Flemish region of Belgium at the age of eleven. She grew up in Schilde and attended the Sint-Jan Berchmans College in Westmalle before obtaining a degree in political science at the University of Antwerp.

She worked for the office of UNICEF in Antwerp and then in the healthcare sector for the Antwerp Hospital Network. She was then as a policy officer for the N-VA faction in the Chamber of Representatives until 2021. In the municipal elections of 2018, van Doesburg was elected as a municipal councilor in Antwerp. In the council, she sat on the committees for housing, urban and neighbourhood maintenance, greenery, animal welfare and health and senior care. For the 2024 Belgian regional elections, she was elected on the N-VA's list to the Flemish Parliament for the Antwerp constituency.

Van Doesburg is also an opinion columnist for the newspaper De Morgen in which she writes about social challenges.

In November 2021, she announced that she had become engaged to fellow N-VA politician Peter De Roover. In January 2025 she announced her first pregnancy. In February 2025, she was sworn in as the acting mayor of Antwerp, replacing Bart De Wever, who had resigned to become prime minister of Belgium.
