= Jan De Vos (politician) =

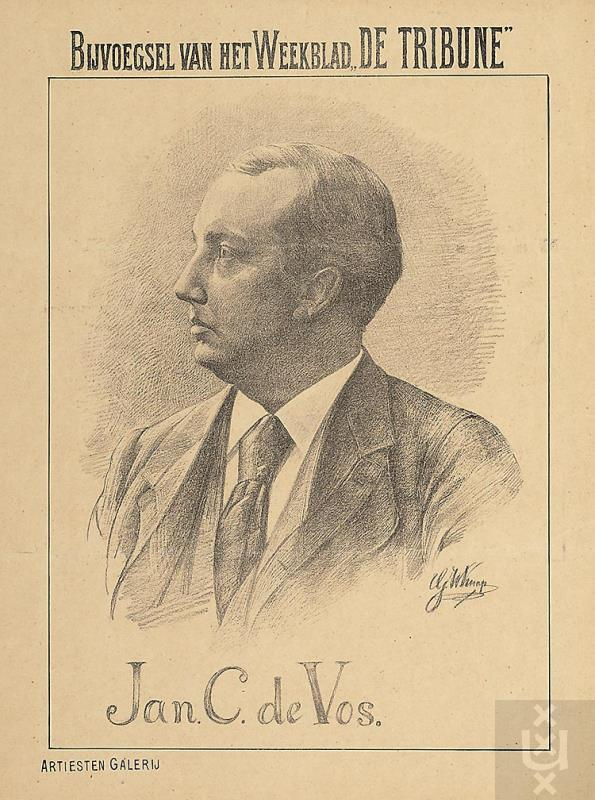
- Born: Jan Baptist De Vos; 7 February 1844; Dendermonde, Belgium
- Died: 30 March 1923 (aged 79); Antwerp, Belgium
- Occupations: politician, trader
- Known for: mayor of Antwerp

Jan Baptist De Vos (7 February 1844 – 30 March 1923) was mayor (burgomaster) of Antwerp in Belgium from 15 March 1909 until 21 July 1921. He stayed on as mayor after the capture of Antwerp by German forces during World War I, and remained in office after the end of German occupation.

== Career ==
Jan De Vos was born in Dendermonde. He became a successful trader and entered local politics when he was elected in the city council as councillor on 19 October 1890.

King Leopold II appointed him mayor of Antwerp on 22 February 1909, much against the wishes of the Liberal Party, of which Jan De Vos was also member, who would have preferred the alderman (schepen) Victor Desguin.

The events of October 1914 were the most intense of his tenure. The German Army besieged the city of Antwerp and the situation worsened in the city due to the German bombardment. The city council decided to negotiate the surrender of the city. De Vos negotiated terms with General Hans Hartwig von Beseler of the German Army in Kontich to the south of Antwerp. De Vos signed the surrender of the city and the remaining fortresses around Antwerp on 10 October 1914.

De Vos remained in office throughout the war. After German capitulation, he was not prosecuted for collaboration and stayed on as mayor until 21 July 1921. He died on 30 March 1923, aged 79.

== See also ==
- List of mayors of Antwerp
- Adolphe Max, mayor of Brussels (1909–39)
