= Lode Craeybeckx =

Mayor of Antwerp between 1947 and 1976

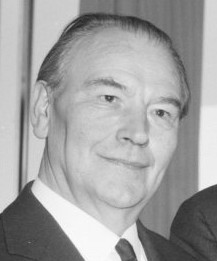
Craeybeckx (1962)

Lode Craeybeckx (24 November 1897 – 25 July 1976) served as mayor of Antwerp, Belgium from 1947 until his death in 1976, becoming the longest-serving mayor of the city in its history.

== Biography ==
François Ferdinand Louis Craeybeckx, better known as Lode, was born in Antwerp in 1897. His father was a policeman from Limburg, while his mother came from Liège. He studied at the Athenaeum of Antwerp before going to the new University of Ghent in 1917. For collaborating with the German occupiers during the First World War, he was sent to prison for five years, but he was released after two years.

Lode Craeybeckx married Irma Lauwers in 1921. They had two children, Hilda and Herman. From 1925 until 1931, he worked as a journalist for the newspaper Volksgazet.

In 1932, Craeybeckx started to work as a lawyer and entered the world of politics. He became a councillor in Deurne for the Belgian Socialist Party. The same year, he entered the Belgian Parliament, where he would stay until 1968. He was the successor of Willem Eekelers as mayor of Antwerp in 1947, and remained in that position for nearly thirty years, a record for the city.

When Lode Craeybeckx died in 1976, the first Alderman Leo Delwaide, Christian democrat and collaborationist mayor of Antwerp under Nazi occupation, took over ad interim, until a new mayor was sworn in. Frans Detiège Alderman for Social Affairs, socialist, and longtime companion of Craeybeckx, fulfilled the position until the end of term. At the 1976 municipal election, the sitting coalition of socialists and Christian democrats were re-elected and Mathilde Schroyens took office as Mayor of Antwerp in 1977.

== Achievements ==
During his run as mayor, Antwerp was massively changed. The Rijksuniversitair Centrum Antwerpen (RUCA) university (1965) and the UIA university (1971) were founded (both were merged with the older UFSIA in the University of Antwerp in 2003). The Middelheim, an open-air museum for modern sculptures, was created in 1951. The city got improved traffic infrastructure and the city and Port of Antwerp were massively expanded.

During this period, many of the older buildings of the city, ranging from the Middle Ages to the 19th century, were replaced by modern high-rise buildings, of which many have been criticized for being bland or ugly.

== The "Craeybeckx Incident" ==
In April 1964, Craeybeckx was reported to allegedly have had a drunken row with a group of Jews in a bar on the Grote Markt. He was reported to have publicly shouted that "it is a pity that the German crematoria did not make more disappear of their sort". There was widespread controversy, but he was nonetheless placed at the top of the Socialist list at the next municipal elections as other party members argued that "someone with so many services given to the movement" could not just be put aside. According to his biographers, he benefited from support during this serious controversy from the Antwerp Catholic press and of the conservative satirical weekly, 't Pallieterke, which had an anti-resistance position and opposed the purging of collaborators after World War II.

== Notes ==
Political offices
Preceded by Willem Eekelers	Mayor of Antwerp; 1947–1976	Succeeded by Leo Delwaide (At Interim), Frans Detiège 1976, Mathilde Schroyens 1977
