= Willem Draeck, Lord of Merksem =

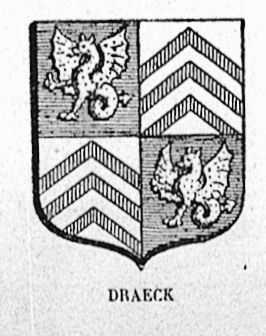
Draeck family heraldic crest

Willem Draeck, Lord of Merksem (died 1525) was a former Lord Mayor of Antwerp. He became Lord of Merxem in 1515, when he bought the Dominium of Merxem.

== Family ==
He was born to an old and important family of Antwerp, he was the son of Waltherus Draeck and Geertuid van de Werve. His sister was married to Cornelis van der Noot. He was related to all the most important noble houses of Antwerp, his descendants include relations to the houses of van Straelen, Schetz, d'Ursel, and van de Werve.

Willem Draeck, Lord of Merksem

  - 1/ Anna Draeck, Lady of Merksem :
    married to Goswin von Straelen, born in Cologne.
    - 1.1/Anthony van Stralen, Lord of Merksem, Mayor of Antwerp. Executed by the King of Spain.
  - 2/Maria Draeck, died before 25 October 1536:
    Married to Willem of Immerseel, Lord of Baudries. Mayor of Antwerp, 1509.
    - 2.1/Jan van Immmerseel: councillor of Maximilian, duke of Bourgondy.
  - 3/ Walraven Draeck: Lord Mayor of Antwerp.
    - Judocus or Joos Draeck (+1528); Alderman of Antwerp married to Lady Barbara Colibrant. Gifted important window in the Church of Saint-James.

== Career ==
In 1515 he bought Merksem Castle, and became Lord of Merksem. He later passed it on to his son in law. He was multiple time Lord Mayor of Antwerp.
