= Leopold De Wael =

Belgian merchant and liberal politician

Léopold Charles Norbert De Wael
- Photo of Léopold de Wael

Mayor of Antwerp
- In office 1872–1892
- Preceded by: Jozef Cornelis Van Put
- Succeeded by: Jan Van Rijswijck

Personal details
- Born: 14 July 1823 Antwerp, United Kingdom of the Netherlands
- Died: 17 August 1892 (aged 69) Antwerp, Belgium
- Party: Liberal Party
- Occupation: Politician, merchant

Léopold Charles Norbert De Wael (14 July 1823 – 17 August 1892) was a Belgian liberal politician and merchant. He served as mayor of Antwerp from 1872 until his death in 1892 and was a key figure in the modernization of the city during the late 19th century.

== Early life and career ==
De Wael was born in Antwerp in 1823, the son of merchant Charles Henri de Wael. He became active in Antwerp’s liberal political movement and was elected to both the provincial council and the national parliament.

== Mayor of Antwerp ==
In 1872, De Wael was appointed mayor of Antwerp. During his two decades in office, he led large-scale urban transformations.

He oversaw the demolition of both the Noordkasteel and the Zuidkasteel (South Castle), military fortifications that had long dominated the city’s layout. The Zuidkasteel, also known as the Citadel of Antwerp, was a 16th-century fortress built by the Duke of Alba between 1567 and 1572 to assert Spanish authority over the rebellious city. Its strategic position at the southern edge of Antwerp had become obsolete by the 19th century. Starting in 1874, demolition works cleared the citadel and its ramparts, freeing up extensive land. This allowed the creation of the Zuid district (South Antwerp), laid out in the Haussmannian style with wide boulevards, cultural institutions, and civic monuments. The Royal Museum of Fine Arts, completed in 1890, became a centerpiece of the new neighbourhood.

The Noordkasteel (North Castle) and the adjoining Spanish city walls were also dismantled during this period. The removal of these outdated military structures, initiated under Mayor Jan Frans Loos and continued by De Wael, opened Antwerp to further urban expansion and connected the old city center with emerging districts.

Through these bold urban interventions, De Wael reshaped Antwerp’s relationship with the Scheldt river, promoted modern infrastructure, and laid the foundation for the city’s economic and cultural growth in the decades that followed.

Public buildings from his era include the Royal Museum of Fine Arts Antwerp , the Stuyvenberg hospital , the Antwerp branch of the National Bank of Belgium, the Antwerp Courthouse, and several schools and theatres.

He promoted the cultural and architectural development of the Zuid (South) district, where Léopold de Waelplaats was later named in his honour.

== Death and legacy ==
De Wael died in office in 1892 and was buried at Schoonselhof Cemetery. His legacy remains visible in the cityscape of Antwerp. His contributions to urban planning and liberal governance are commemorated by monuments and portraits, including one in the Ghent City Museum. A statue of De Wael was also placed in his honour near the Museum of Fine Arts.
