= Encyclopedia of the Flemish Movement =

Dutch-language encyclopedia

- Native name: Encyclopedie van de Vlaamse beweging
- Website: https://encyclopedievlaamsebeweging.be/nl
- Content license: CC-BY 4.0 (text only)
- ISSN: 3041-427X

The Encyclopedia of the Flemish Movement (Dutch: Encyclopedie van de Vlaamse beweging) is a Dutch-language encyclopedia which intends to serve as a general reference work on the Flemish movement. The first edition of the encyclopedia was published between 1973 and 1975. It was succeeded by the New Encyclopedia of the Flemish Movement (Nieuwe Encyclopedie van de Vlaamse beweging; NEVB) in 1998. The digital edition (Digitale Encyclopedie van de Vlaamse beweging; DEVB) was officially launched in January 2024.
