= Encyclopedie van Friesland =

Dutch encyclopedia

The Encyclopedie van Friesland is a Dutch language encyclopedia about Friesland, the Netherlands published in 1958 by Elsevier.

In addition to an encyclopedic section, it consists of a compendium on, among other things, Frisian landscape, the history of Friesland, Frisian literature and Frisian culture. The editor-in-chief was J.H. Brouwer. He was assisted by an editorial board consisting of J.J. Kalma, W. Kok and M. Wiegersma.

Post-1954 information was not included in the encyclopedia.
