= Eric Defoort =

Belgian politician (1943–2016)

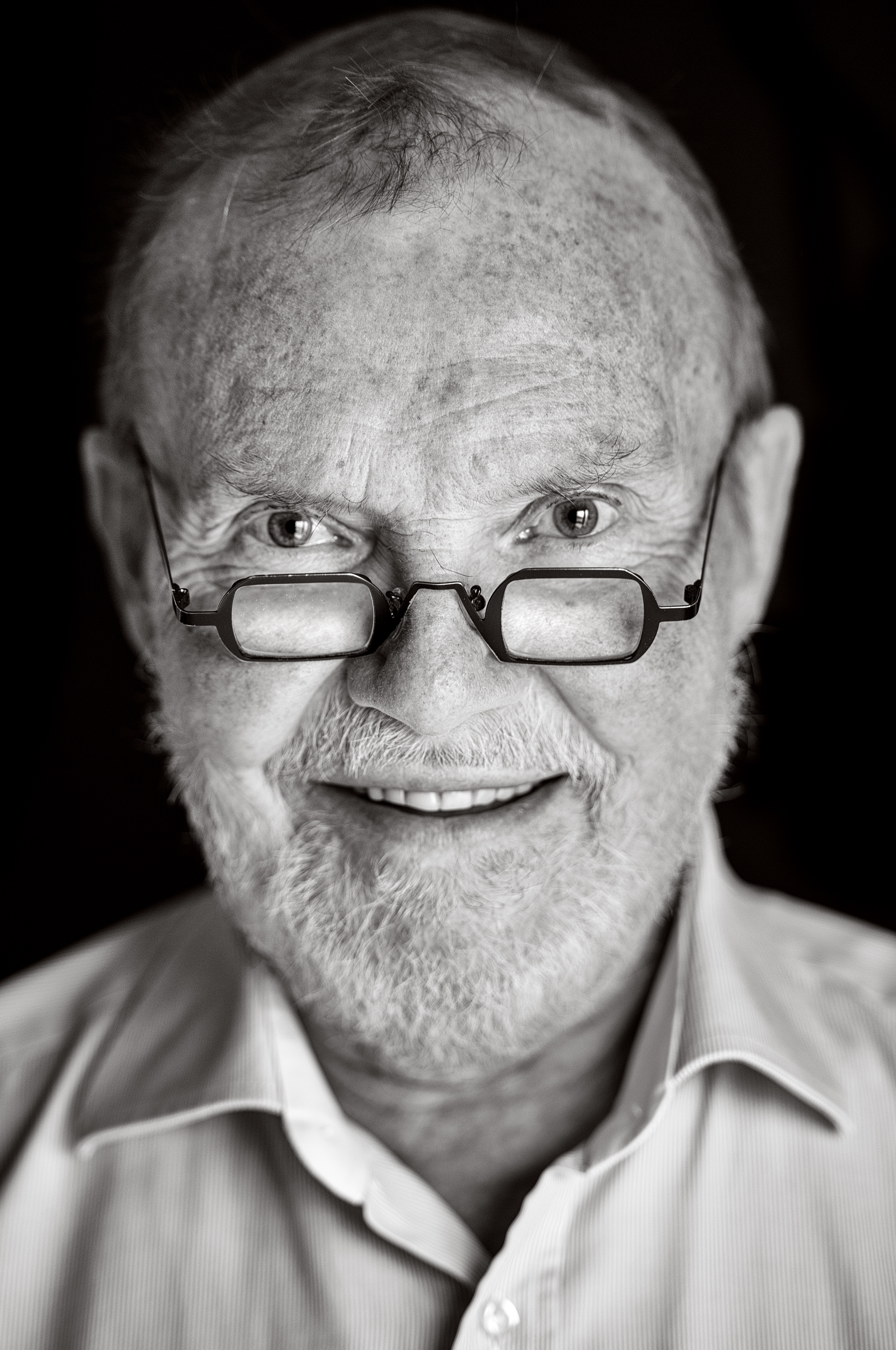
Eric Defoort in 2016

Eric Defoort (27 June 1943 in Ypres, Belgium – 16 or 17 December 2016) was a Flemish Belgian politician and president of the European Free Alliance.

Between 2007 and 2009, Defoort was the president of the Flemish Popular Movement (Vlaamse Volksbeweging – VVB), a non-party linked movement advocating Flemish autonomy. In 1982, he became the chief librarian and a professor of history at the Catholic University of Brussels.

At the EFA-General Assembly in Venice, March 2010, he was elected the new President of the European Free Alliance.

As historian he studied in depth the history of nationalism and published on topics like identity.

Defoort was a member of the Nieuw-Vlaamse Alliantie (N-VA), a party that became a full member of EFA in 2010. They supported his candidacy.

As president, he saw to the organisation and strategy of the European Free Alliance.

During the 2012 local elections, he was in 48th place on the Ghent N-VA list.
