= Jan Van Rijswijck =

Belgian lawyer, liberal politician and journalist

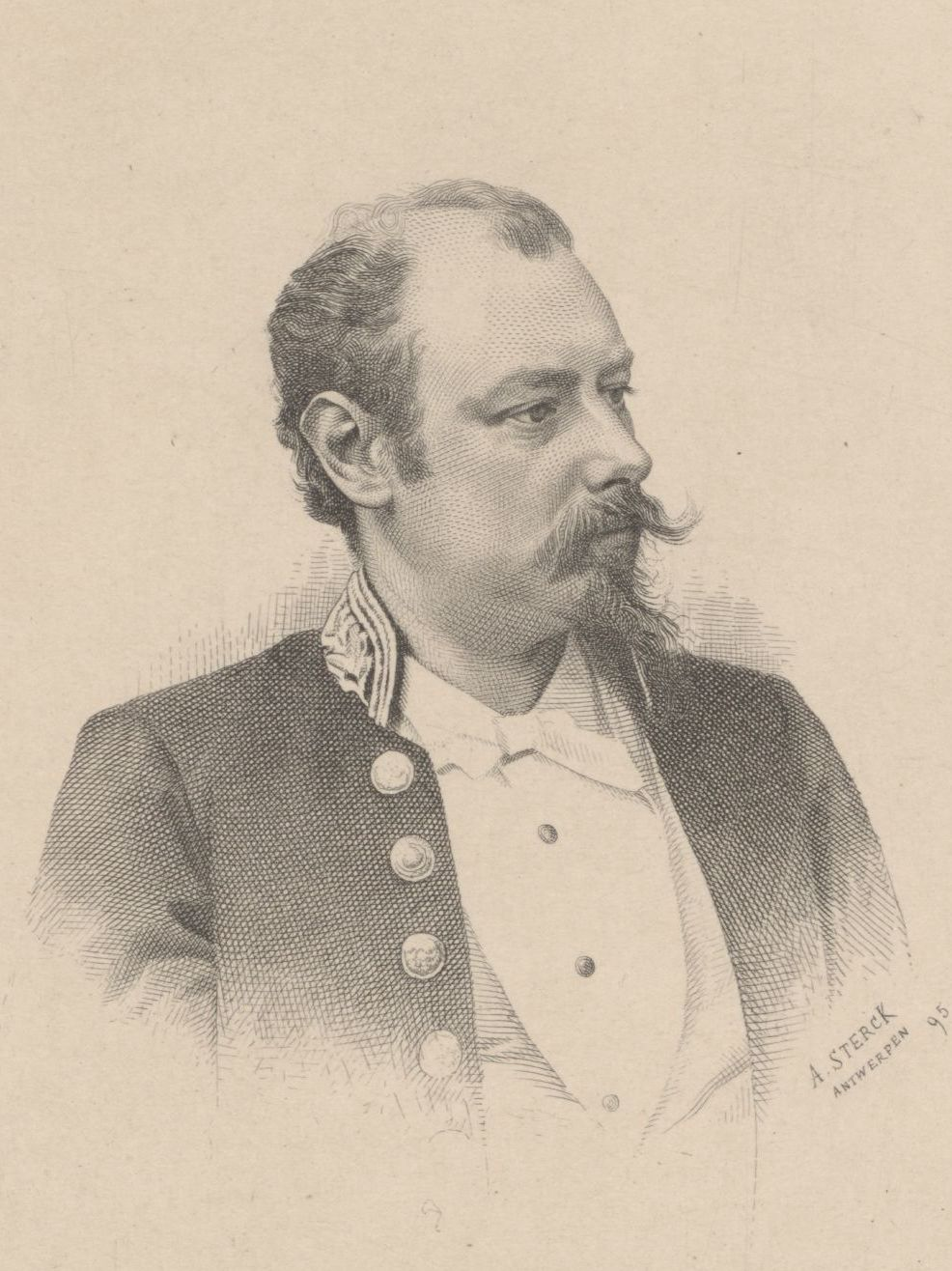
- Jan van Rijswijck
- Born: 14 February 1853; Antwerp, Belgium
- Died: 23 September 1906 (aged 53); Testelt, Belgium
- Occupations: politician, lawyer, journalist

Jan Van Rijswijck (14 February 1853 – 23 September 1906) was a Belgian lawyer, liberal politician and journalist.

== Education ==
He started his education at the boarding school of Melle and continued his education at the Catholic University of Leuven and finally at the Universite Libre de Bruxelles, where he graduated as a Doctor in Law on 20 April 1876.

== Career ==
He established himself as a lawyer in Antwerp. On 25 October 1881, he became a member of the municipal Council of Antwerp and on 28 October 1889, he was appointed alderman of education. In 1892, he succeeded Leopold De Wael as mayor of Antwerp. From 1892 up to 1906, he was mayor of Antwerp, and from 1900 up to 1906, a Member of Parliament.

While he was mayor the Antwerp World Fair of 1894 was held, several important buildings were constructed such as for the pilotage, the Antwerp Central Station and the toll house. Also in the port of Antwerp the construction of the Kanaaldok was started, and as a result the activity of the port expanded.

Of the many speeches, which he held on judicial matters, Flanders and ships, only a few were published: on Abraham Lincoln (recitation, Antw. 1877); George Washington (recitation Antw. 1879); Cavour (recitation, Antw. 1879); all due to the Willemsfonds. In the Antwerp journals he published several articles from 1883 up to 2 September 1888, and most of the editorials he wrote for the De Kleine Gazet.

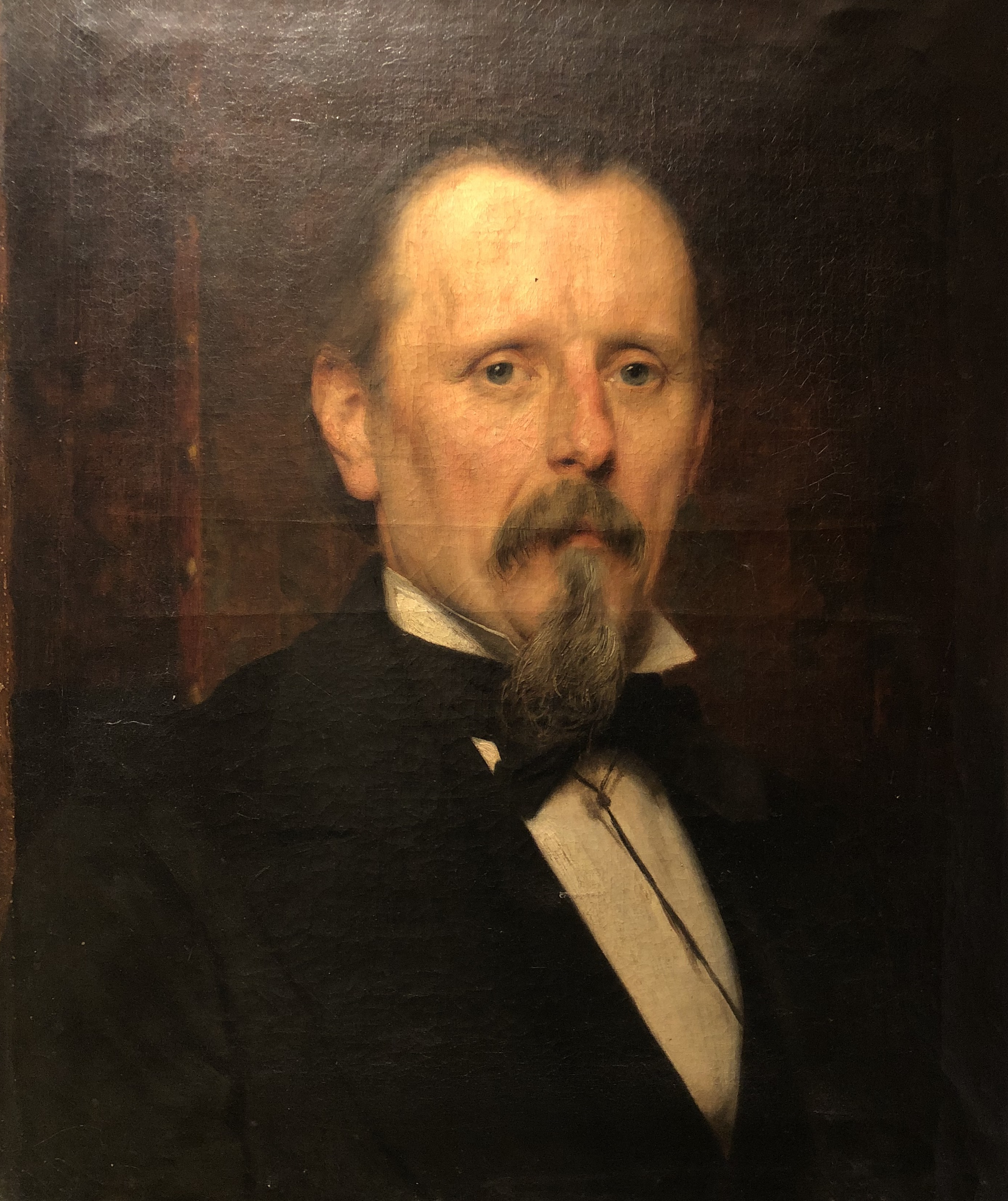
Portrait by P. Van Der Ouderaa, Antw. 1876

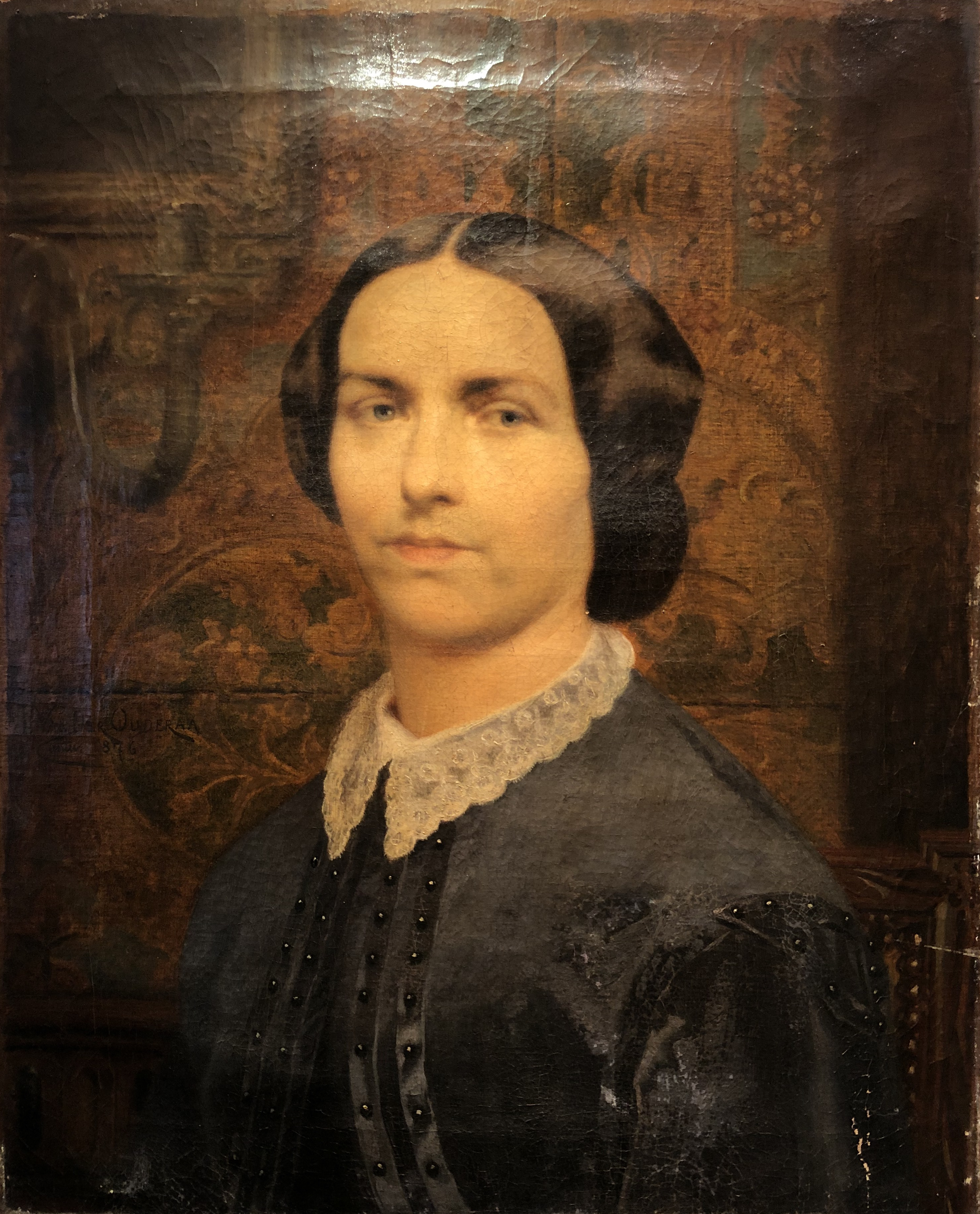
Portrait of wife of Jan Van Rijswijck by P. Van Der Ouderaa, Antw. 1876 https://commons.wikimedia.org/wiki/Category:Pierre_Jean_Van_der_Ouderaa

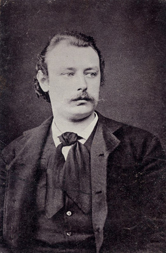

== Sources ==
- Jan Van Rijswijck (Dutch)
- Jan Van Rijswijck (Liberal archive)
