= Marcellin Jobard =

Belgian lithographer, photographer and inventor

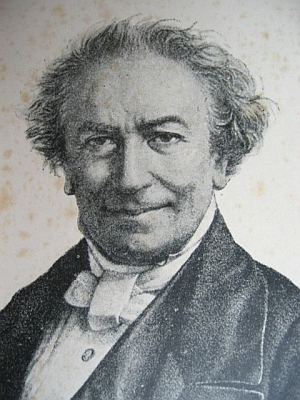
- Born: 17 May 1792; Baissey, France
- Died: 27 October 1861 (aged 69); Brussels, Belgium
- Occupations: Lithographer, photographer, Inventor, journalist

Jean-Baptiste-Ambroise-Marcellin Jobard (17 May 1792 – 27 October 1861) was a Belgian lithographer, photographer and inventor of French origin. Founder of the first significant Belgian lithographic establishment, the first photographer in Belgium on 16 September 1839, and director of the Musée de l’Industrie de Bruxelles (Industry Museum of Brussels) from 1841 to 1861, Jobard played a role in the artistic, technological, scientific and industrial development of Belgium during the Dutch period and the reign of Leopold I.

== Personal life ==
Jobard was born in Baissey, in the Haute-Marne area of France. His father, Claude Jobard, was a farmer, then a rentier and mayor of Baissey for thirty years. Also a poet, he lived in a house at the foot of a hill on the slopes of which he owned two gardens and a vineyard. He married Marguerite Prudent, daughter of the village prévôt (magistrate).

Jobard spent six or seven years in Langres at the same school that Denis Diderot had attended, then continued his education at the Lycée imperial de Dijon, where he attended classes given by Joseph Jacotot.

Towards the end of his life, Jobard developed an enthusiasm for spiritualism and in his final years, he appears to have lost his mind. He is buried in Brussels Cemetery.

== Career ==
A surveyor in the Dutch land registry during the Empire and the Restoration, Jobard became a naturalized Dutch citizen. Having heard of lithography, he resigned from the land registry and settled in Brussels where he was resident by 1819. His first commission was to illustrate the Annales générales des Sciences physiques, printed by Weissenbruch under the scientific editorship of Jean Baptiste Bory de Saint-Vincent, Auguste Drapiez and Jean-Baptiste Van Mons. In 1820 Jobard founded a sizable lithographic establishment, employing Jean Baptiste Madou.

The Société d’encouragement pour l’industrie nationale in Paris launched an international competition for lithographers in 1828, aimed at rewarding those who had made the greatest progress in their art. Jobard was awarded the gold medal ("Le Courrier des Pays-Bas", 3 December 1828).

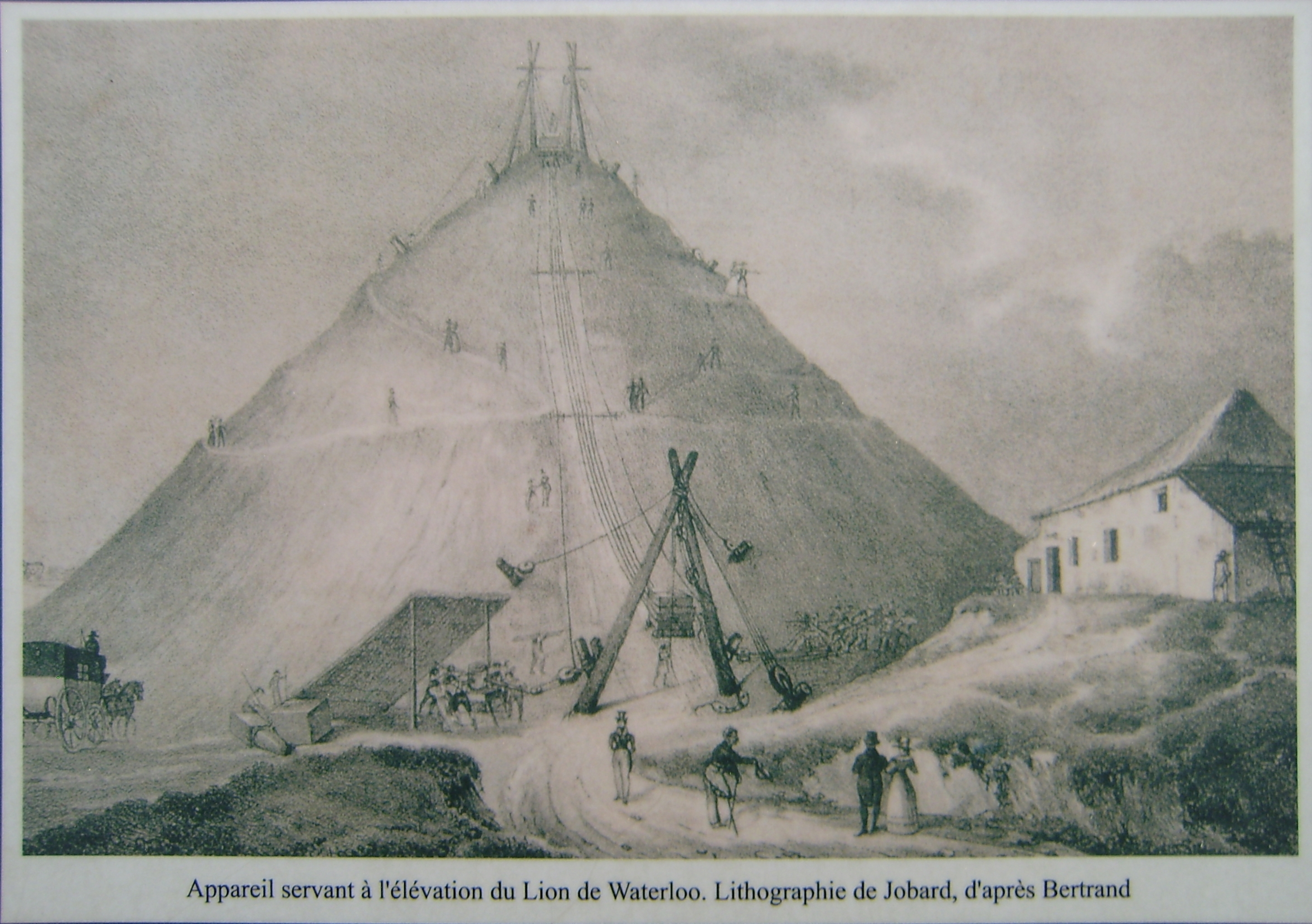
The erection of the Lion's Mound in Waterloo, 1825. Engraving by Jobard after Bertrand drawing.

Following the 1830 revolution, Jobard automatically became a Belgian citizen. After his lithography business went bankrupt, he spent a year in Verviers where he immersed himself in industrial issues. In 1832 he became a propagandist for the philosophy of Claude Henri de Rouvroy, comte de Saint-Simon in Belgium. He travelled to Britain in 1833 where he met Charles Babbage and then campaigned for the railway to be introduced into Belgium.

In 1837 he became the owner of two daily newspapers, Le Fanal de l’Industrie and Le Courrier belge, in which he published a column "Bulletin Industriel". In 1841 Jobard proposed in his newspaper adding what he called "extra emotional typographic characters" (including an irony punctuation) which may be considered precursors to present-day emoticons and emojis.

In 1839 Jobard was appointed Commissioner for the Belgian Government at the French industrial exhibition in Paris, where he met François Arago, Louis Daguerre, baron Pierre-Armand Séguier amongst many other intellectuals and industrialists. He also bought a Daguerreotype apparatus. Back in Brussels, he succeeded in taking the first Belgian photograph on 16 September 1839, a daguerreotype view of the Place des Barricades/Barricadenplein in Brussels, following this up in October with the first Belgian portrait. Both of these plates are now lost. Jobard was appointed Director of the Musée Royal de l’Industrie in Brussels in 1841, where he developed his ideas of museology which already then met modern-day requirements for conservation, cataloguing, study and popularization.

Ingenious and imaginative, Jobard registered 73 patents in lighting, heating, food supply, transport, ballistics and other areas. In 1850 he set up a patents office, a brokerage for assisting inventors to file patents and protect their inventions. He published numerous works and articles on industrial property, earning him a reputation as the greatest campaigner for intellectual property rights in the nineteenth century.

Jobard developed an economic and social theory that he called "Monautopole" and that he defined as "from monos, alone, autos, oneself and pôleô, dealing". Historically a monopoly was a concession, granted exclusively, for trading a good belonging to all, an unjust privilege arising arbitrarily. Monautopole would be the natural right to dispose of oneself and the fruits of one's labours, "the just reward for work, talent and persistence". His writings earned him the praise of the future Napoleon III, Victor Hugo and Hugues Felicité Robert de Lamennais.

== Works ==
- J. B. A. M. Jobard, "Nouvelle économie sociale ou Monautopole industriel, artistique, commercial et littéraire, fondé sur la pérennité des brevets d'invention, dessins, modèles et marques de fabrique", Paris, Mathias, Bruxelles, chez l'auteur, 1844.
- J. B. A. M. Jobard, "Les nouvelles inventions aux Expositions universelles", Bruxelles – Leipzig, Flatau, 1857–58, 2 vol. gd in-8°.

== Honours and distinctions ==
- 1858 : Officer of the Legion of Honour
- 1858 : Saint Helena Medal
- Knight of the Royal Order of Francis I of the Two Sicilies
