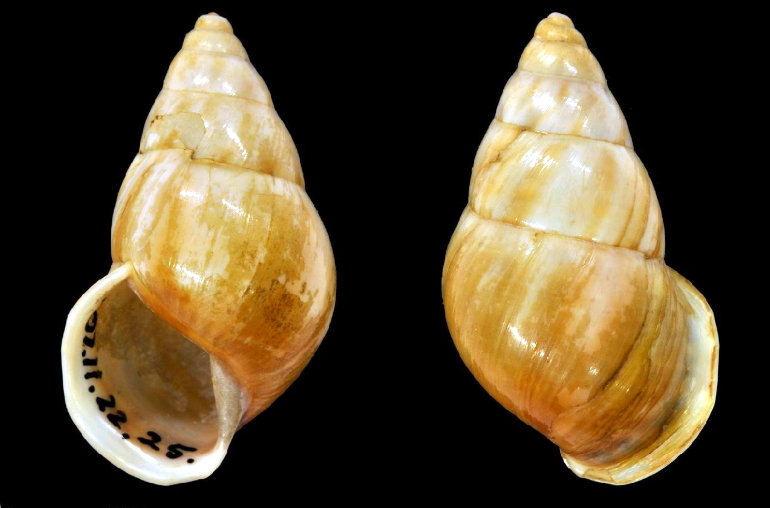
- Shell of Amphidromus bataviae (lectotype at the Natural History Museum, London)

Scientific classification
- Kingdom: Animalia
- Phylum: Mollusca
- Class: Gastropoda
- Order: Stylommatophora
- Family: Camaenidae
- Genus: Amphidromus
- Species: A. bataviae

Binomial name
- Amphidromus bataviae (Grateloup, 1840)

Synonyms
- Bulimus bataviae Grateloup, 1840 superseded combination (basionym); Partula bataviae Grateloup, 1840

= Amphidromus bataviae =

Species of snail in the family Camaenidae

Amphidromus bataviae is a species of medium-sized air-breathing tree snail, an arboreal gastropod mollusk in the family Camaenidae.

== Habitat ==
This species lives in trees.

== Distribution ==
The type locality of this sinistral species is Sumatra, Indonesia.
