= Conus pseudotextile =

Scientific classification
- Kingdom: Animalia
- Phylum: Mollusca
- Class: Gastropoda
- Subclass: Caenogastropoda
- Order: Neogastropoda
- Superfamily: Conoidea
- Family: Conidae
- Genus: Conus
- Species: †C. pseudotextile

Binomial name
- †Conus pseudotextile Grateloup, 1835

Extinct species of gastropod

Conus pseudotextile is an extinct species of sea snail, a marine gastropod mollusk, in the family Conidae, the cone snails and their allies. The last reported sighting of this species was in 2003.

== Distribution ==
This species occurs in France.
