= Augustus Van Dievoet =

Belgian legal historian

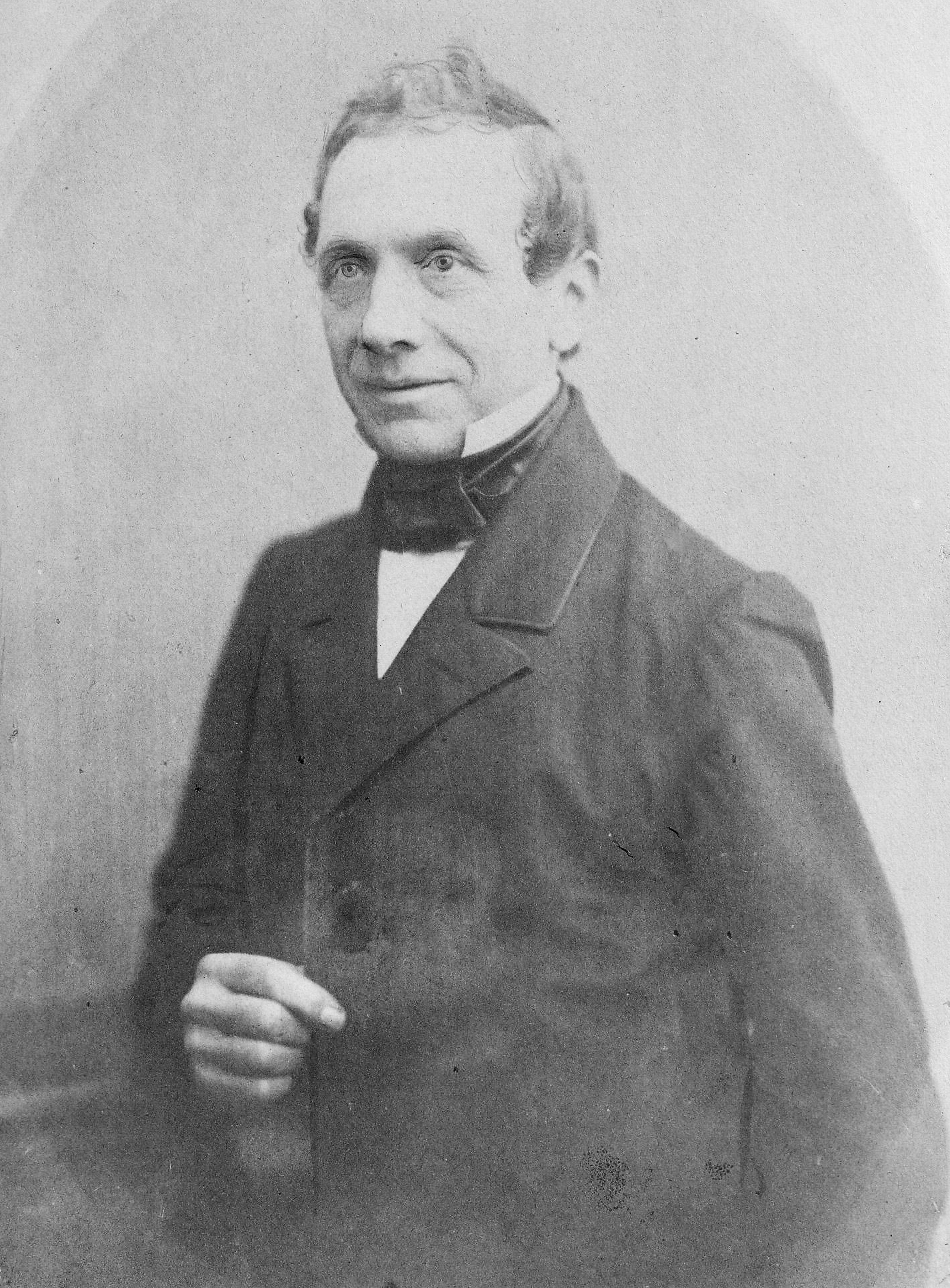
- Born: Jean Auguste Van Dievoet; 3 May 1803; Brussels
- Died: 31 October 1865 (aged 62); Brussels
- Other names: Augustus Divutius; Auguste Van Dievoet
- Citizenship: France (1803-1815); United Kingdom of the Netherlands(1815-1830); Kingdom of Belgium(1830-1865)
- Education: Imperial Lyceum, Brussels; State University of Louvain
- Occupation: Supreme Court Advocate
- Known for: Principal legal historian of the newly formed independent Belgium
- Spouse: Antoinette Coniart (1819-1885)
- Children: Jules Van Dievoet
- Parent(s): Jean-Louis Van Dievoet (1777-1854) and Jeanne Wittouck
- Family: Van Dievoet family

Augustus Van Dievoet (/ˈdiːvʊt/, Latin: Augustus Divutius, French: Auguste Van Dievoet, 3 May 1803 – 31 October 1865) was a Belgian legal historian and Supreme Court advocate. His son, Jules Van Dievoet, also a Supreme Court advocate, married Marguerite Anspach (1852-1934), the daughter of Jules Anspach, who served as burgomaster of Brussels in 1863–1879.

== Biography ==
Augustus Van Dievoet studied at the Imperial Lyceum of Brussels (Lycée Imperial de Bruxelles). Van Dievoet demonstrated an exceptional capacity for academic work, excelling in his study of humanities and winning numerous prizes in Latin and Greek humanities at the college. He went on to study law at the State University of Louvain, where he received his doctorate in law on 24 March 1827.

Van Dievoet was called to the bar on 7 April 1827 and became a member of the Bar Association between 1838 and 1848. Around this time, Van Dievoet became a judge at the Court of First Instance of Brussels and a member of the Board of Discipline for lawyers at the Court of Cassation. On 3 August 1848, after twenty-one years as a lawyer at the Court of Appeal, Augustus Van Dievoet was appointed by Royal Decree an advocate of the Supreme Court.

Van Dievoet and his colleagues Hubert Dolez and Augustus Orts were the most eminent lawyers of the time. Van Dievoet is best known as one of the first historians of the law of independent Belgium. He was a student of Jean-Joseph Raepsaet, Jean-François-Michel Birnbaum, his teacher at the State University of Louvain, and Friedrich Carl von Savigny. He founded the Juridical library in the Palace of Justice of Brussels.

He is cited on the list of founders of the Université libre de Bruxelles.

He was a founding member of the second Société des douze and sat on first board of directors of the Société royale de Flore de Bruxelles.

== Publications ==
Van Dievoet devoted his Latin thesis at the State University of Louvain in 1827 to ancient Belgian customs (De origine diversarum consuetudinum localium regni nostri). This work was a great success and was often cited in scholarly works and international works. In 1843, Adolphe Roussel commented on Van Dievoet's work in his Encyclopedia of Law: "In a remarkable thesis published in Leuven in 1827, Van Dievoet tried to find the origin of Belgian customs. Regrettably, he has not pursued this work further, which showed promise of new and ingenious views".

== Bibliography ==
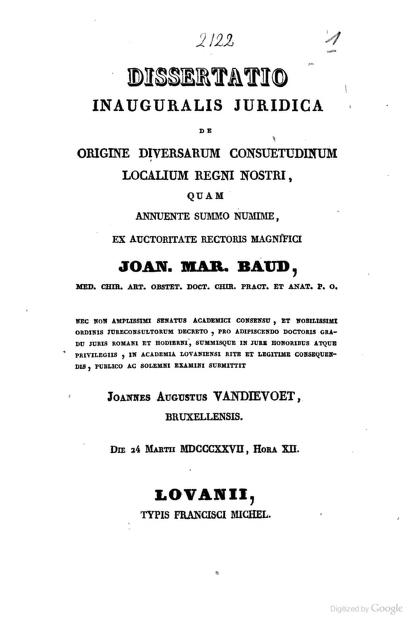
Title page of 'De origine diversarum consuetudinum localium regni nostri'

- 1827 : Baron Frédéric de Reiffenberg, Archives pour servir à l'histoire civile et littéraire des Pays-Bas, faisant suite aux Archives philologiques, tome 3, Louvain, édition Michel, 1827, pp. 253–254.
- 1829 : Jean-François-Michel Birnbaum, "Ueber den gegenwärtigen Zustand der Gesetzgebung und Rechtswissenschaft im Königreich der Niederlande", in: Kritische Zeitschrift für Rechtswissenschaft und Gesetzgebung des Auslandes, herausgegeben von Mittermaier und Zachariä, Heidelberg, 1829, p. 143 et p. 159.
- 1833 : Baron Frédéric de Reiffenberg et alii, Messager des sciences historiques, des arts et de la bibliographie de Belgique ou nouvelles archives, historiques, littéraires et scientifiques, vol. I, Brussels, 1833, p. 305.
- 1840 : Johan Hendrik Beucker Andreae, Disquisitio de origine juris municipalis Frisici, 1840, p. 29.
- 1843 : Adolphe Roussel, Encyclopédie du droit, Bruxelles, 1843, p. 21, note 1.
- 1846 : Jean Jacques Gaspard Foelix, Revue de droit français et étranger, 1846, p. 949.
- 1847 : Revue des revues de droit publiées à l'étranger, recueil trimestriel, 1847, p. 53.
- 1847 : Jacques Britz, De l'ancien droit belgique ou histoire de la jurisprudence, 1847, p. 62.
- 1859 : N. Funck et alii, L'horticulteur praticien, revue de l'horticulture française et étrangère, Paris-Bruxelles, 1859, p. 116. (felicitations to advocate Van Dievoet) et p. 143 (médaille de vermeil).
- 1865 : Bulletin du bibliographie belge, 1865, p. 492.
- 1869 : Gustave Duchaine, Edmond Picard, Manuel pratique de la profession d'avocat en Belgique, 1869, p. 20.
- 1882 : Antoine Alexandre et Barbier, Joseph-Marie, Dictionnaire des ouvrages anonymes, Paris, 1882, p. 744.
- 1884 : Léon Vanderkindere, L'université de Bruxelles, notice historique, Brussels, 188, "Liste des fondateurs de l'université libre de Bruxelles", p. XL: "Vandievoet, avocat, Rue des Bogards".
- 1886 : La Belgique maçonnique, 2e édition, Bruxelles, librairie Tillot, 1886 (il y est erronément mentionné sous le nom d'Antoine Van Dievoet, avocat, Bruxelles, rue des Bogards 8 au lieu de 16).
- 1936-1938 : Baron Paul Verhaegen, "Jean-Auguste Van Dievoet, jurisconsulte", in : Biographie Nationale de Belgique, tome 26, 1936–1938, coll. 384–385.
- 1968 : John Gilissen, Professeur à l'Université de Bruxelles, "Un procès de pillages commis à Bruxelles au début de la Révolution de 1830. L'affaire Londens et consorts", in : Mélanges offerts à G. Jacquemyns, Bruxelles, 1968, éditions de l'ULB, p. 331 et p. 341.
- 1873 : Patria Belgica, encyclopédie nationale ou exposé méthodique de toutes les connaissances, Bruxelles, 1873, p. 410.
- 1873 : J. B. Vanderstraeten-Levieux, Membres de la juridiction consulaire de Bruxelles, Bruxelles, 1873.
- 1898 : Louis Lartigue, La juridiction consulaire en Belgique, Brussels, Bruylant, 1898, p. 45.
- 1944 : Charles Terlinden, La révolution de 1830 racontée par les affiches, 1944, p. 146.
- 1945 : Louis Robyns de Schneidauer, "Il y avait rue Neuve...", in : Revue des Amateurs, août 1945, pp. 13–15 et septembre 1945, pp. 51–53.
- 1950 : Roger Moretus Plantin de Bouchout, Demeures familiales, notices historiques sur la maison Plantin à Anvers et quelques propriétés, Anvers, De Sikkel, 1950.
- 1969 : "Ascendance van Dievoet du lignage Sweerts", in : les Lignages de Bruxelles, 1969, n°40, p. 156.
- 1979 : Chevalier Georges van Hecke, Notes pour servir à l'histoire du Barreau de Cassation, Bruxelles, 1979
- 1985 : Madame Dolez, "Les Anspach d'Est en Ouest", dans Le Parchemin, Bruxelles, 1985, pp. 380–381, note 9.
- 2012 : Bart Coppein et Jérôme de Brouwer, Histoire du barreau de Bruxelles / 1811–2011 / Geschiedenis van de balie van Brussel, Bruxelles, Éditions Bruylant, 2012, pp. 88, 90, 93, 200.
- 2012 : Ellen Tistaert, "Le murmure des livres. Als boeken vertellen... Historiek van de bibliotheek van de balie van Brussel", dans : Histoire du barreau de Bruxelles / 1811–2011 / Geschiedenis van de balie van Brussel, (dir. Bart Coppein and Jérôme De Brouwer), Brussels, Éditions Bruylant, 2012, p. 200.

== See also ==
- Van Dievoet family
- Société royale de Flore de Bruxelles
- Société des douze
