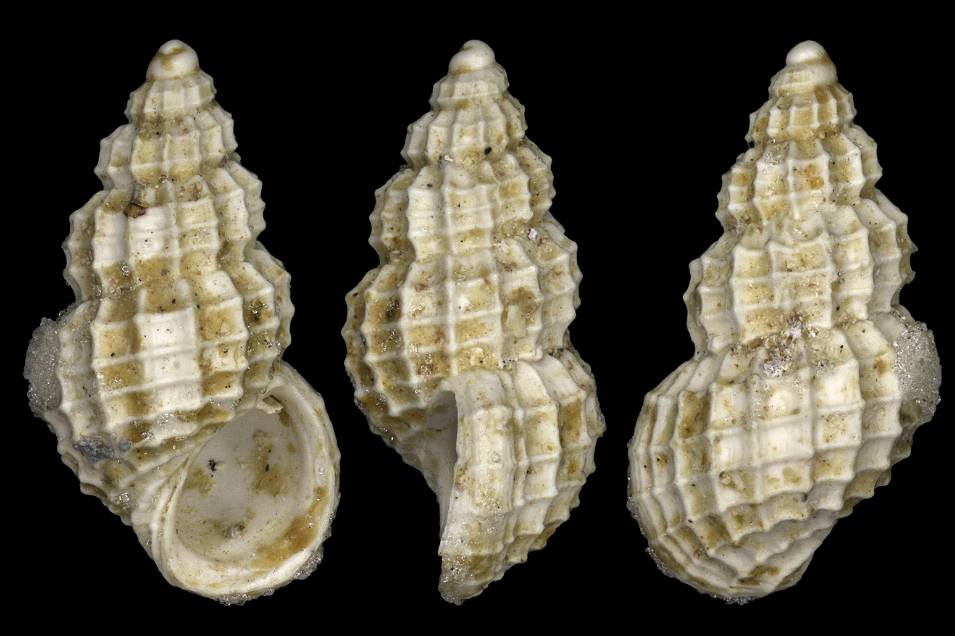
- Shell of Alvania aquensis (holotype at MNHN, Paris)

Scientific classification
- Kingdom: Animalia
- Phylum: Mollusca
- Class: Gastropoda
- Subclass: Caenogastropoda
- Order: Littorinimorpha
- Superfamily: Rissooidea
- Family: Rissoidae
- Genus: Alvania
- Species: †A. aquensis

Binomial name
- †Alvania aquensis (Grateloup, 1838)

Synonyms
- † Manzonia (Taramellia) subspinicosta Cossmann, 1921 ·; † Manzonia subspinicosta Cossmann, 1921 junior subjective synonym; † Rissoa aquensis Grateloup, 1838 (original combination); † Rissoa clathrata Grateloup, 1828 (invalid: junior homonym of Rissoa clathrata Gray, 1826; R. aquensis is a replacement name)

= Alvania aquensis =

Species of gastropod

Alvania aquensis is an extinct species of minute sea snail, a marine gastropod mollusc or micromollusk in the family Rissoidae.

== Distribution ==
Fossils of this species were found in Oligocene strata in Aquitaine, France.
