= Volvarina splendens =

Scientific classification
- Kingdom: Animalia
- Phylum: Mollusca
- Class: Gastropoda
- Subclass: Caenogastropoda
- Order: Neogastropoda
- Family: Marginellidae
- Subfamily: Marginellinae
- Genus: Volvarina
- Species: †V. splendens

Binomial name
- †Volvarina splendens (Grateloup, 1834)

Synonyms
- † Marginella splendens Grateloup, 1834 (original combination)

Species of gastropod

Volvarina splendens is an extinct species of sea snail, a marine gastropod mollusk in the family Marginellidae, the margin snails.

Subspecies

- † Volvarina splendens aturensis (Peyrot, 1928)
- † Volvarina splendens splendens (Grateloup, 1834)

== Distribution ==
Fossils of this marine species were found in Oligocene strata in the Landes, France.
