= Société des douze =

Scholary and Literary Dining Club

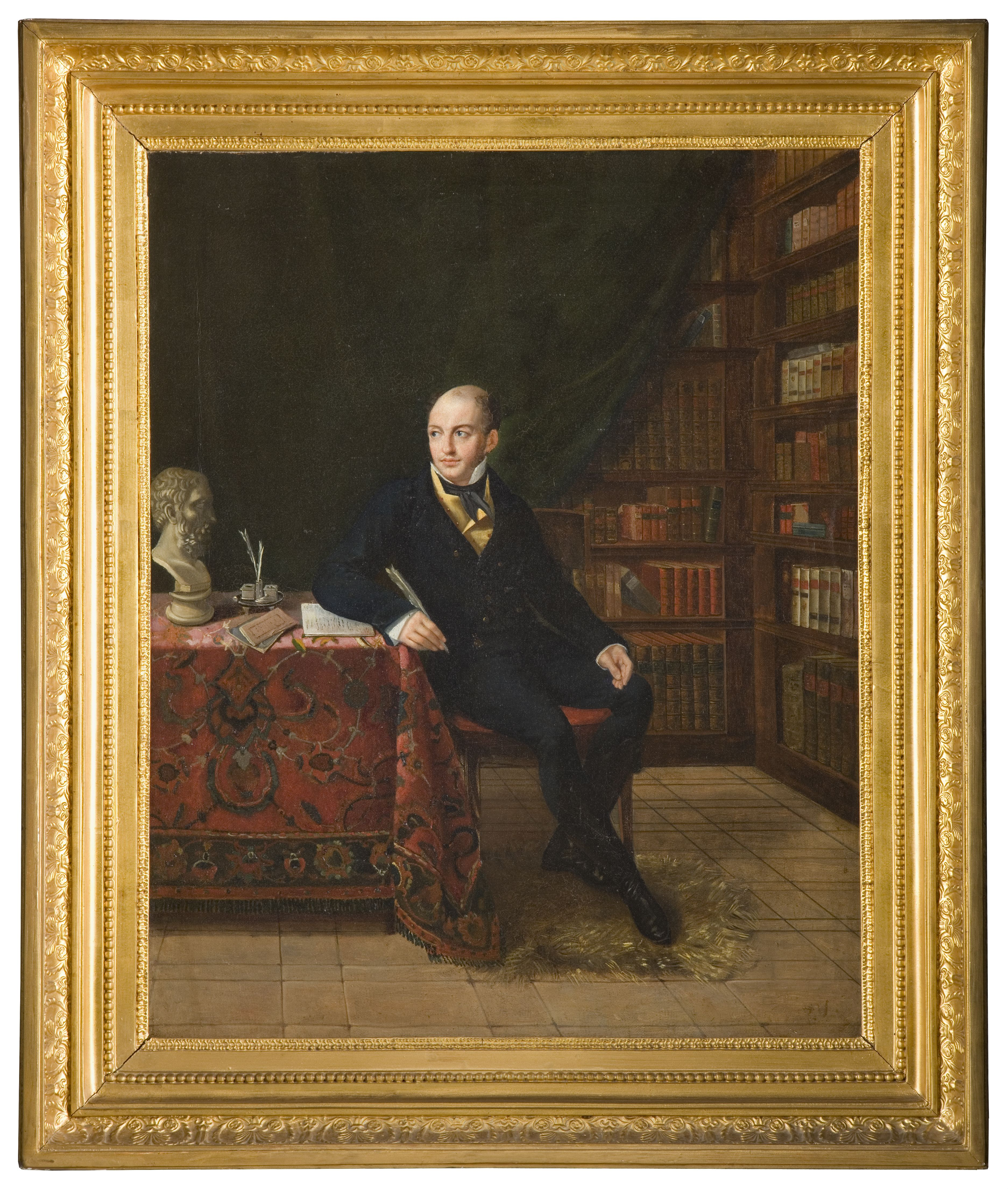
Louis de Potter, Belgian revolutionary, was a founding member of the first society.

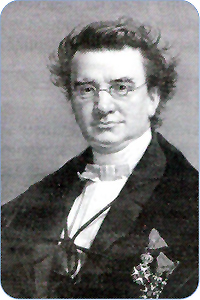
Auguste Baron, intellectual, was a founding member of the first society.

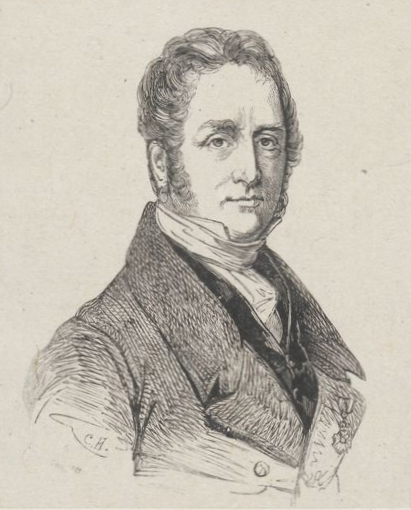
Joseph-Denis Odevaere, painter, was a founding member of the first society.

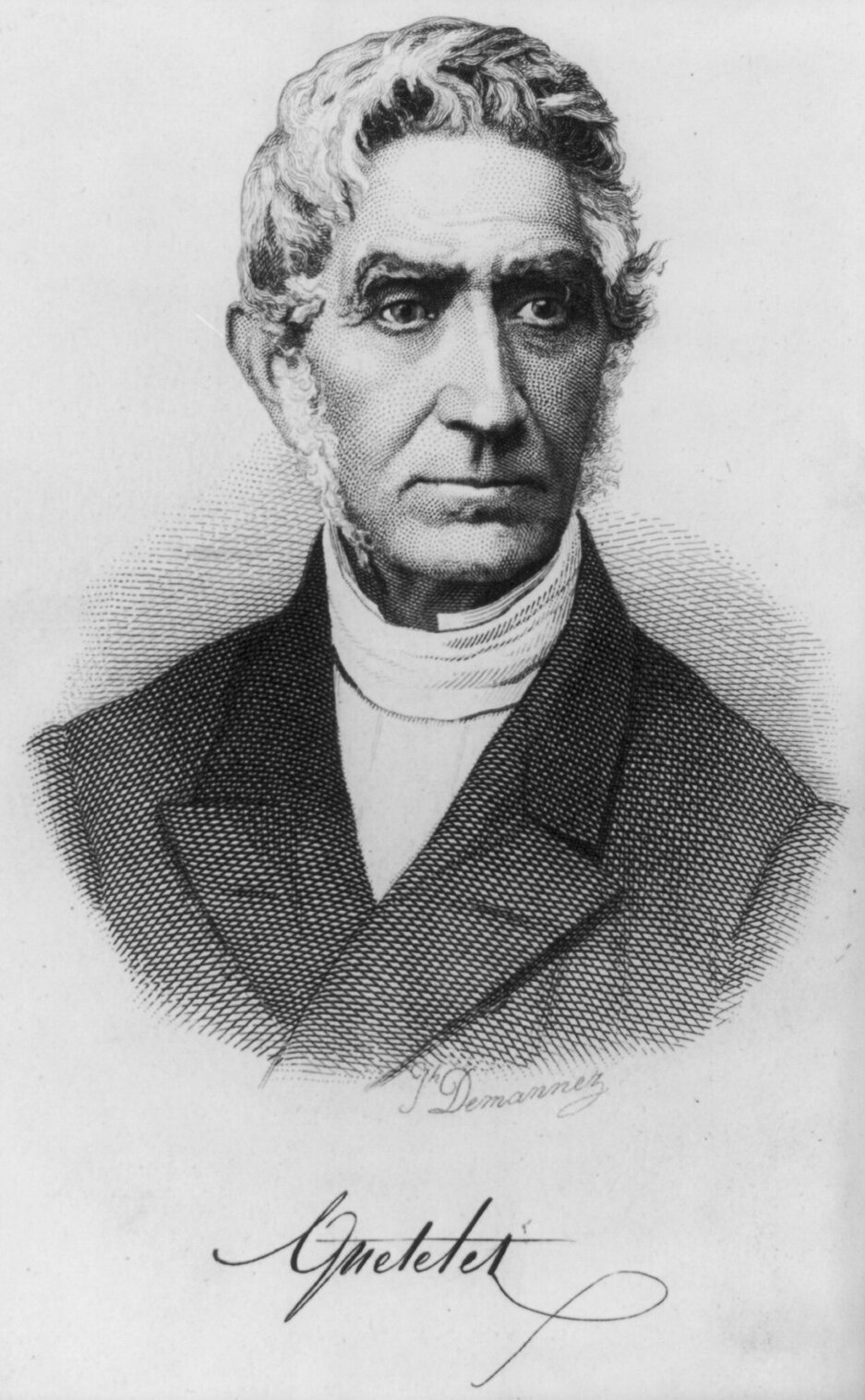
Adolphe Quételet, astronomer and mathematician, was a founding member of the first society.

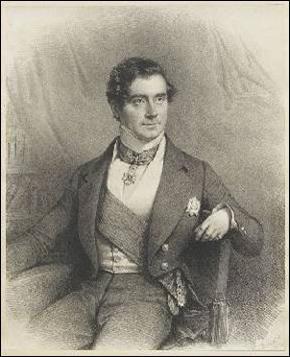
Sylvain Van de Weyer, who would become the 8th prime minister of Belgium, was a founding member of the first society.

The Société des douze (French; lit. 'Society of the Twelve') was a scholarly and literary dining club in Brussels.

== The first society ==
Its precursor, the Société de littérature de Bruxelles (lit. 'Literature Society of Brussels') founded on 10 January 1800, was deprecated by the government of the United Kingdom of the Netherlands and disappeared in 1823. Goswin de Stassart, Victor-Joseph de Jouy, Adolphe Quetelet, Frédéric de Reiffenberg, Eugène Van Bemmel, and the poet Philippe Lesbroussart [fr] were members of this society.

Some of its members continued to meet in the salon of Lesbroussart and founded in the same year (1823) the Société des douze.

=== Founding members ===
The founding members were:

- Auguste Baron
- Philippe Doncker [fr]
- Louis de Potter
- Auguste Drapiez
- Louis Gruyer [fr]
- Lucien Jottrand [fr]
- Philippe Lesbroussart [fr]
- Joseph-Denis Odevaere
- Adolphe Quetelet
- Édouard Smits [fr]
- Jean-François Tielemans
- Sylvain Van de Weyer

=== Activities ===
Since its inception, important personalities were members of the society. The secrecy surrounding it attracted suspicion from the Press and William I's government.

=== Dissolution ===
This first Société des douze, founded during the reign of William I, ended around 1830, as the Belgian Revolution seemed imminent.

It was, however, revived in 1834 after Belgian independence.

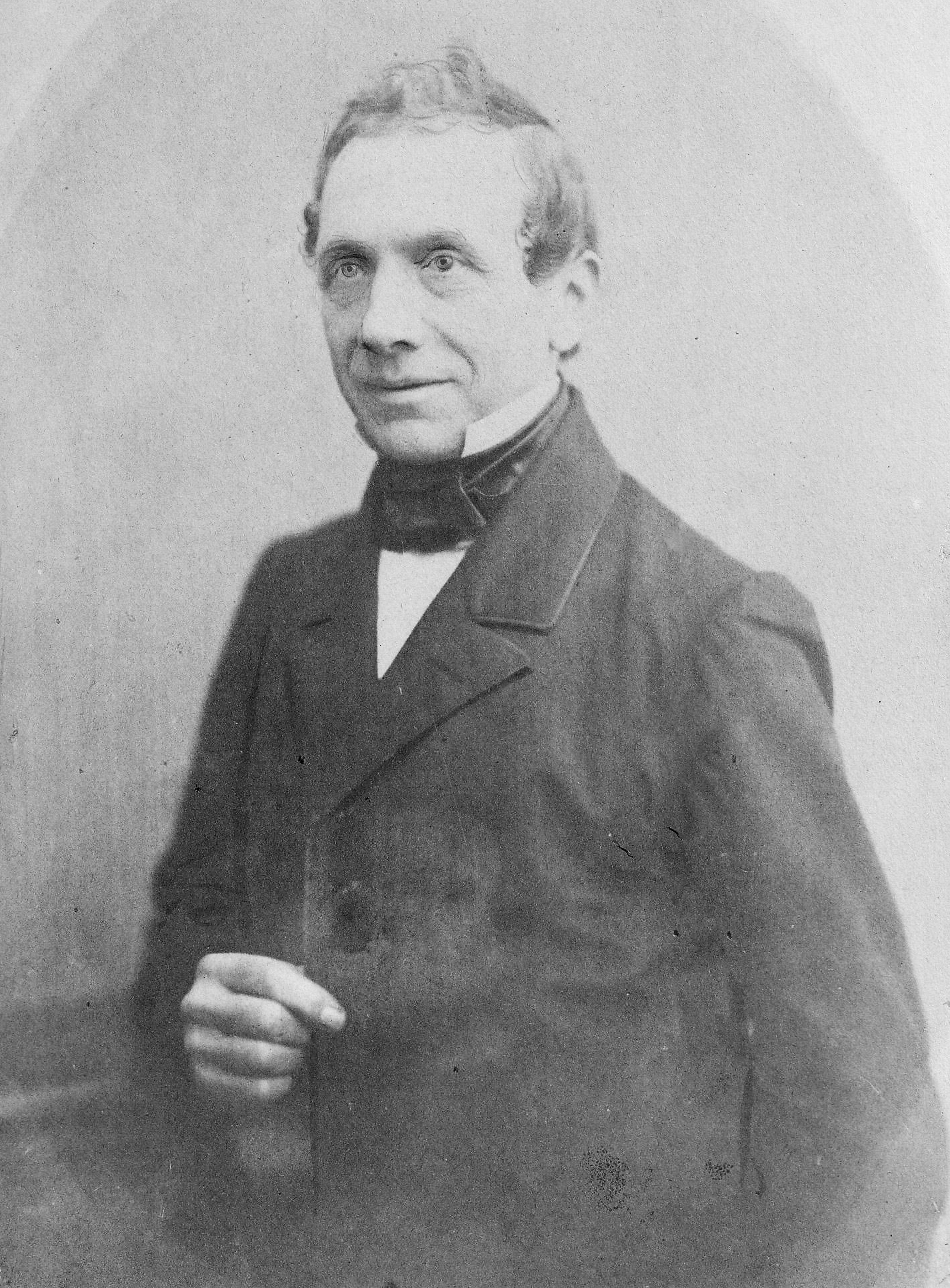
Augustus van Dievoet, lawyer and legal historian, founding member of the second society

== The new society ==
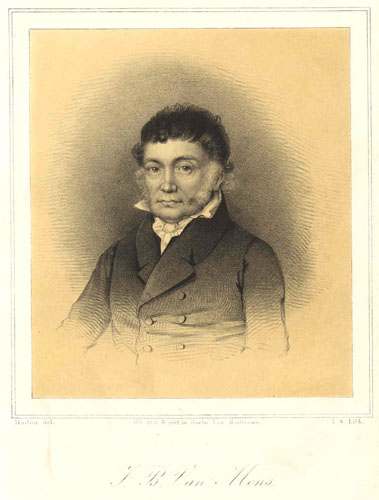
Jean-Baptiste Van Mons, chemist, founding member of the second society

This second Société des douze was founded in 1834, in the same spirit of the first one, by the new generation who would bring it back to life. While the first society was primarily composed of scholars and intellectuals that were active in the opposition to the government of William I, the members of this new society were almost exclusively from the world of the magistrate and Supreme Court of Brussels.

=== The founding members ===
- Van Damme
- P. De Cuyper
- Delporte
- Vandevelde
- François Joseph Verhaegen [fr]
- Jean-Baptiste Van Mons,
- Théodore Van Mons,
- Heernu. H. (or F. Heernu)
- Delporte
- Van Parys
- Louis Ranwet [fr]
- Augustus van Dievoet
