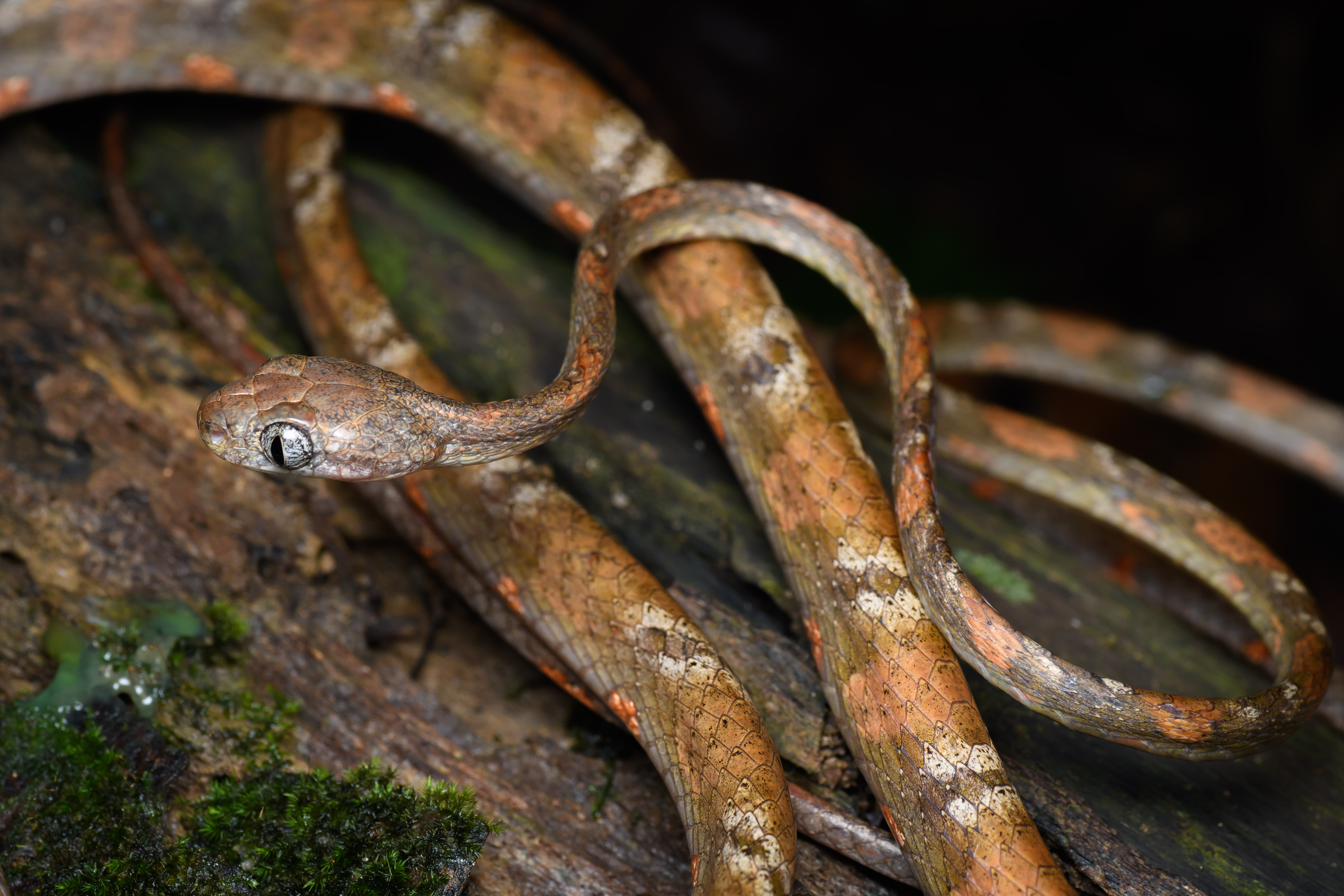

Conservation status
- Least Concern (IUCN 3.1)

Scientific classification
- Kingdom: Animalia
- Phylum: Chordata
- Class: Reptilia
- Order: Squamata
- Suborder: Serpentes
- Family: Colubridae
- Genus: Boiga
- Species: B. drapiezii

Binomial name
- Boiga drapiezii (F. Boie, 1827)
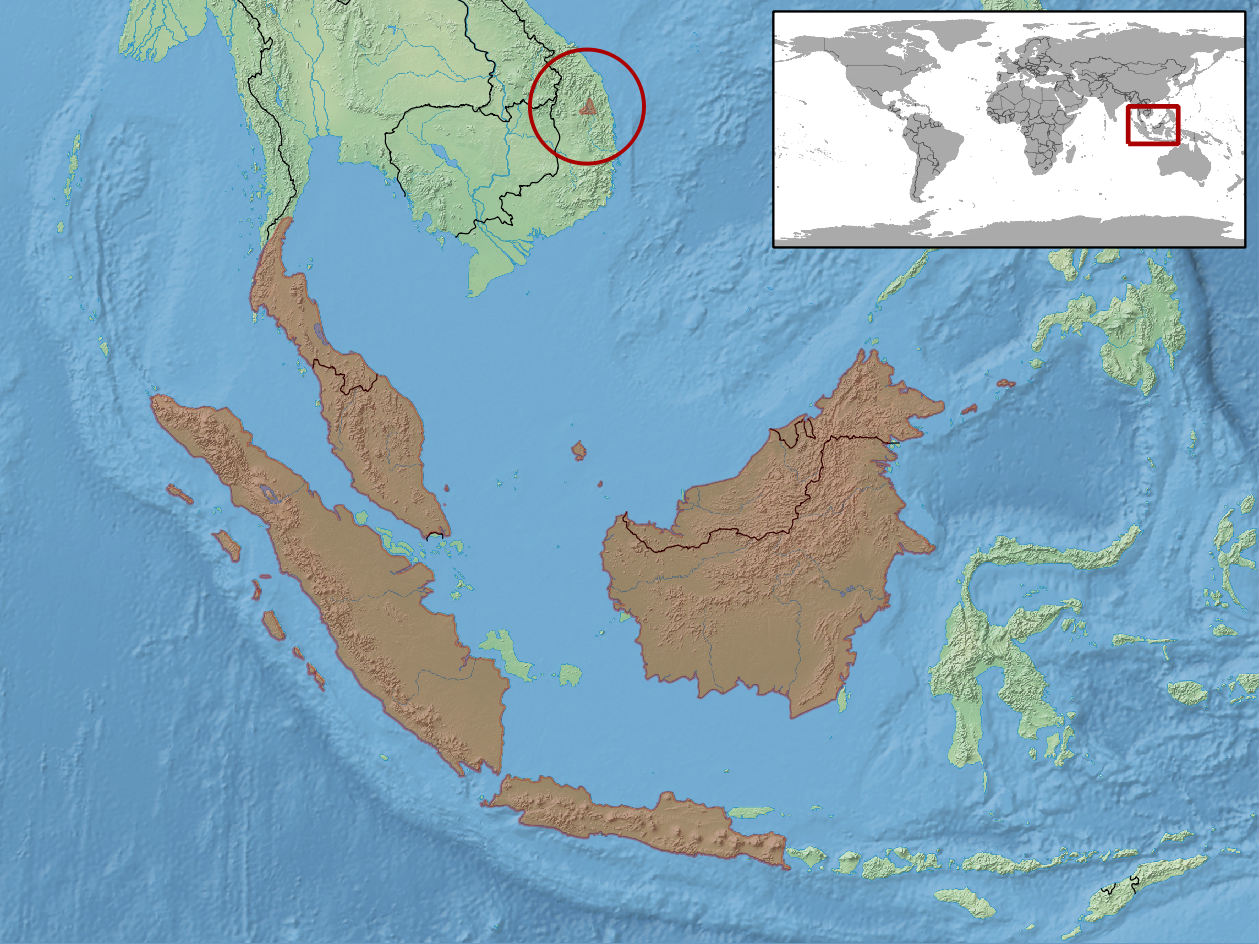

Synonyms
- Dipsas drapiezii H. Boie in F. Boie, 1827; Triglyphodon drapiezii — A.M.C. Duméril, Bibron & A.H.A. Duméril, 1854; Dipsadomorphus drapiezii — Boulenger, 1896; Boiga drapiezii — Barbour, 1912

= Boiga drapiezii =

White-spotted cat snake

Species of snake

Boiga drapiezii, commonly known as Drapiez's cat snake and the white-spotted cat snake, is a species of long and slender rear-fanged snake in the family Colubridae. The species is native to Maritime Southeast Asia and is common throughout its range.

== Etymology ==
The epithet, drapiezii, is in honor of Belgian naturalist Auguste Drapiez.

== Description ==
There are two known phases of B. drapiezii. The green phase has a marbled green body with a more robust head and width. The brown phase is much more slender with orange brown triangle-like bands across the body. This species is in need of urgent review, with possibly subspecies awaiting discovery and subsequent description.

== Geographic range ==
B. drapiezii is found in Borneo, Indonesia, Peninsular Malaysia, the Philippines, Singapore, and Thailand, Vietnam.

== Habitat ==
The preferred natural habitat of B. drapiezii is forest, at altitudes of 80–900 m (260–2,950 ft).

== Behavior ==
The white-spotted cat snake is nocturnal and arboreal. It can often be found moving about on the forest floor in search of prey and travel. It is found in tropical rainforest, sometimes on branches near streams.

== Diet ==
In the wild, the white-spotted cat snake preys upon frogs, geckos, and other small lizards, as well as insects, birds, and bird eggs.

== Reproduction ==
B. drapiezii is oviparous.
