= Société royale de Flore de Bruxelles =

The Société royale de Flore de Bruxelles (French; lit. Royal Society of Flora), founded in 1822, at the time of the United Kingdom of the Netherlands, was a botanical society in Brussels.

It was named after Flora, the Roman goddess of flowers and of the season of spring.

== History ==
It is a successor of the Confrérie de Sainte Dorothée, founded in Brussels in 1660. In 1935 it merged with the Société royale linnéenne de Bruxelles to form the Société royale linnéenne et de Flore de Bruxelles.

=== First directors ===
- Charles-Joseph d'Ursel, President.
- Van Voldem de Lombeck, vice-president.
- Reynders, treasurer.
- Symon-Brunelle, secretary, rue de l'Empereur.
- Augustus Van Dievoet, lawyer at the Court of Cassation, administrator.

== Exhibitions ==
They organised two yearly exhibitions, one in winter, in February, and the other in summer, in July.

== Publications ==
- Bulletin de la Société Royale Linnéenne de Bruxelles
- Bulletin de la Société Royale Linnéenne et de Flore de Bruxelles

== Bibliography ==
- J. Balis, Conservateur à la Bibliothèque Royale Albert premier, Le premier Jardin botanique de Bruxelles, Extrait de l'histoire des jardins botaniques de Bruxelles (1870-1970), Ed. du Crédit communal, 1970, page 6.
- Les archives de la Société Royale Linnéenne et de Flore de Bruxelles fondée en 1935 et qui a hérité des archives de la Confrérie de sainte Dorothée fondée en 1640 ainsi que des archives de la Société royale de Flore fondée en 1825, et allant de l'année 1640 à 1970, ont été déposées en 1925 (réf.Archives Historiques, n°3811) et en 2007 aux Archives de la Ville de Bruxelles. Elles constituent 13 mètres de rayonnages.
- Le Livre d'Or porte la référence: n°3812, aux Archives de la Ville de Bruxelles.
- Mauvy, Bruxelles et ses environs, p 123.
