= Baissey =

- Commune
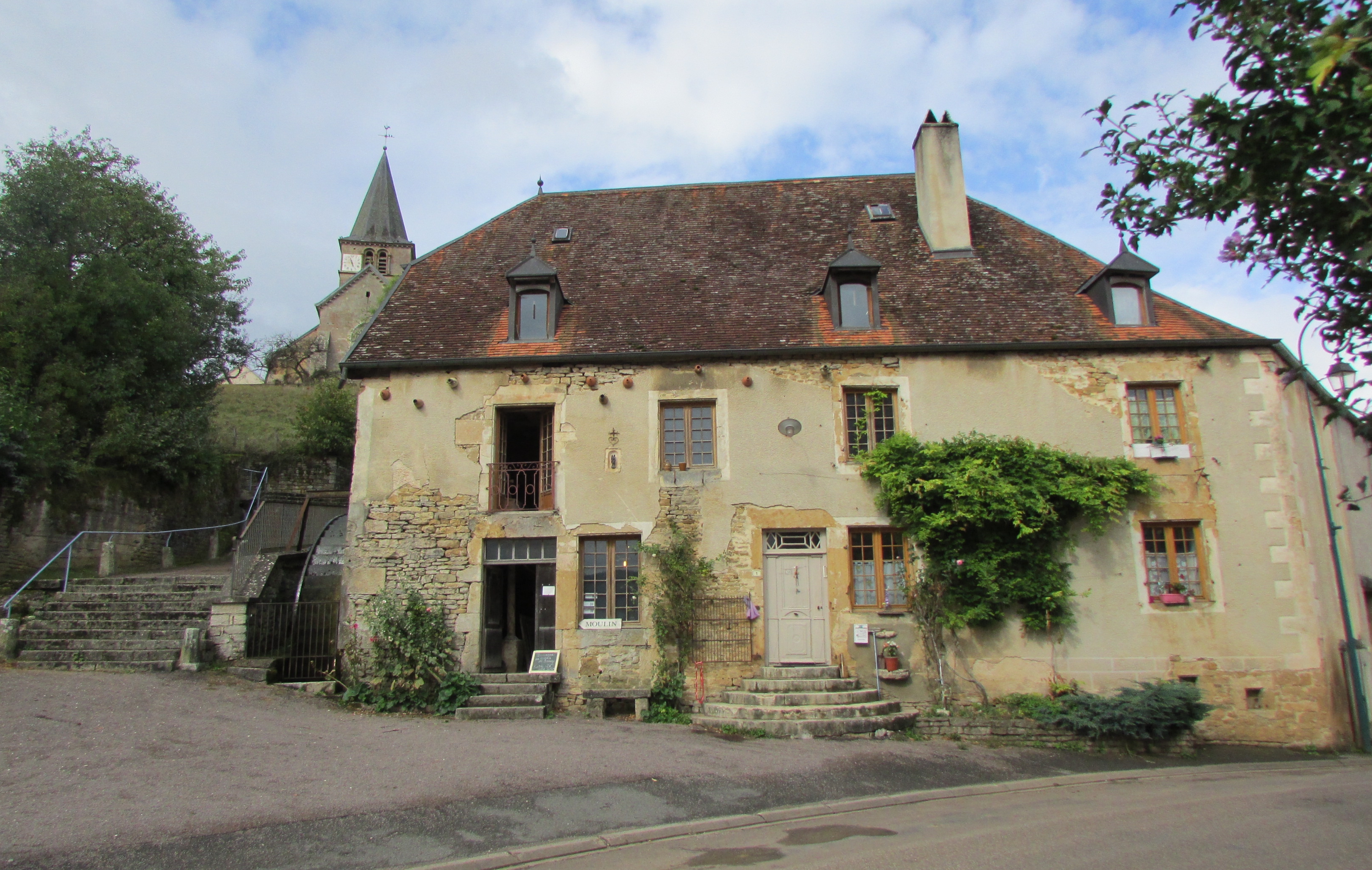
- The old mill in Baissey

- Coat of arms
- Location of Baissey
- Location within France Location within Grand Est
- Coordinates: 47°45′10″N 5°15′06″E
- Country: France
- Region: Grand Est
- Department: Haute-Marne
- Arrondissement: Langres
- Canton: Villegusien-le-Lac

Government
  - Mayor (2020–2026): Patrick Mielle
- Area^{1}: 9.97 km^{2} (3.85 sq mi)
- Highest elevation: 472 m (1,549 ft)
- Lowest elevation: 310 m (1,020 ft)
- Population (2023): 167
  - Density: 16.8/km^{2} (43.4/sq mi)
- Time zone: UTC+01:00 (CET)
  - Summer (DST): UTC+02:00 (CEST)
- INSEE/Postal code: 52035 /52250
- ^{1} French Land Register data, which excludes lakes, ponds, glaciers > 1 km^{2} (0.386 sq mi or 247 acres) and river estuaries.

Baissey (French pronunciation: [bɛsɛ]) is a commune in the Haute-Marne department in the Grand Est region in northeastern France.

== Population ==
Historical population
Year	Pop.	±% p.a.
1968	212	—
1975	213	+0.07%
1982	224	+0.72%
1990	227	+0.17%
1999	200	−1.40%
2007	204	+0.25%
2012	199	−0.50%
2017	193	−0.61%
2023	167	−2.38%
Source: INSEE

== People born in Baissey ==
- Marcellin Jobard inventor, journalist, lithographer.

== See also ==
- Communes of the Haute-Marne department
