= Alexandre Bivort =

Belgian horticulturalist

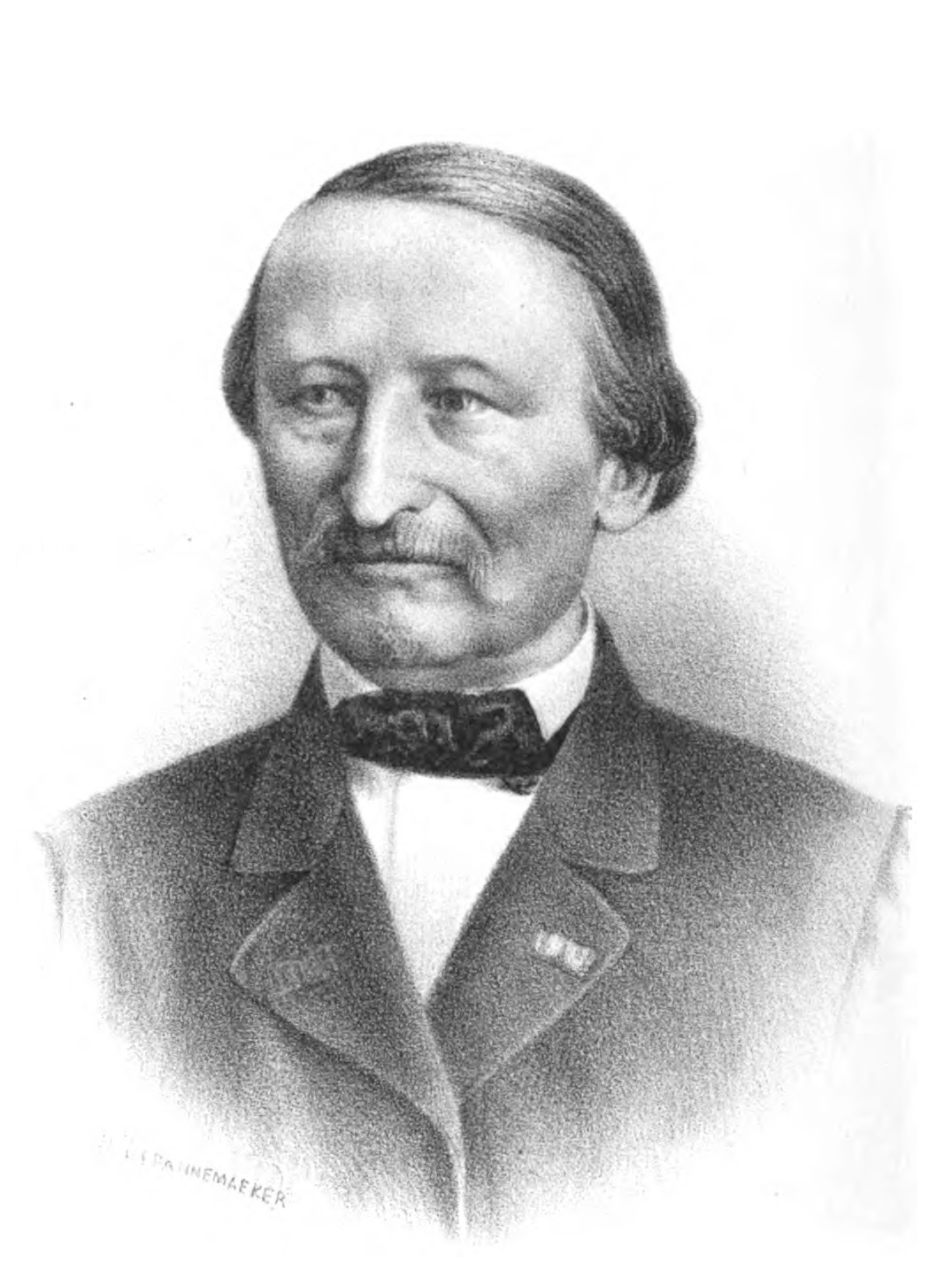
Alexandre Bivort by Pierre de Pannemaeker

Alexandre Joseph Désiré Bivort (1809–1872) was a Belgian horticulturalist, specialising in pomology. He was particularly influential in systematising the nomenclature of strains of pear.

== Life ==
Bivort was born at Fleurus on 9 March 1809. He was educated at the industrial school in Melle and at the college in Aalst, where he graduated secondary school at the age of fifteen. While working in the family coal business at Jumet, he devoted much of his time to the study of agriculture, eventually becoming a full-time horticulturalist. In 1840 he acquired the seed collection of Jean-Baptiste Van Mons, numbering about 20,000 seeds, and gradually transported it to his own property at Saint-Remy-Geest. In 1854 he became the director of the Société Van Mons. He corresponded with many leading international pomologists, and was the secretary of the editorial committee of the Commission Royale de Pomologie's Annales de pomologie belge et étrangère (1853–1860), to which he was a substantial contributor. He died in Fleurus on 8 May 1872.

== Publications ==
- Album de pomologie (4 vols., 1847–1850).

== Honours and awards ==
- 23 August 1858: Knight in the Order of Leopold.
