= Auguste Baron =

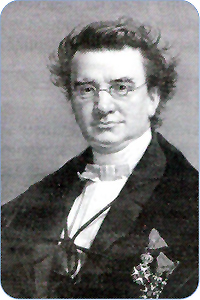
Auguste Baron

Auguste Alexis Floréal Baron (1794–1862) was a Belgian study prefect of Royal Athenaeum of Brussels and the first secretary of the Universite Libre de Bruxelles.

== Career ==
Together with Pierre-Théodore Verhaegen and Adolphe Quetelet, he was one of the founders of the Universite Libre de Bruxelles, and the first secretary of the university when it was founded on 20 November 1834.

At his inauguration lecture, he defined the basic principles of the new university: nous jurons d'inspirer à nos élèves, quel que soit l'objet de notre enseignement, l'amour pratique des hommes qui sont frères, sans distinction de caste, d'opinion, de nation; nous jurons de leur apprendre à consacrer leurs pensées, leurs travaux, leurs talents au bonheur et à l'amélioration de leurs concitoyens et de l'humanité (E: We solemnly pledge to inspire our pupils, whatever the object of our teaching, the love for all mankind, without distinction of caste, opinion, nation; we pledge to learn how to them to devote their thoughts, their work, their talents to the happiness and the improvement of the conditions of their fellow-citizens and of humanity)

He was a founding member of the first Société des douze.

== Sources ==
- Le principe du libre examen (ULB, French)
