= Joseph Denis Odevaere =

Dutch painter

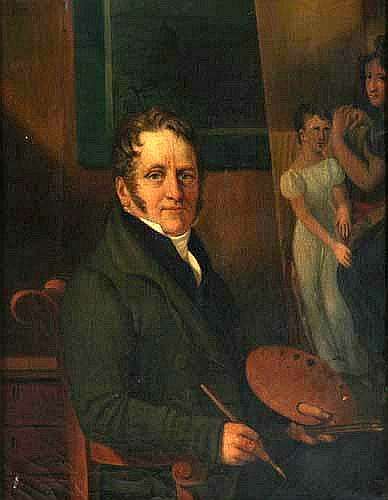
Self-portrait (date unknown)

Joseph Denis Odevaere, or Joseph-Désiré Odevaere (2 December 1775, in Bruges – 26 February 1830, in Brussels), was a Neo-Classical painter from the Southern Netherlands (now Belgium). He served as court painter to King William I.

== Biography ==
His first art lessons came at the Kunstacademie Brugge, where he studied with François Wynckelman. He then moved to Paris, continuing his studies with Joseph-Benoît Suvée and Jacques-Louis David. In 1804, he was awarded the Prix de Rome for his painting The Death of Phocion. This earned him his first commissions, which he spent a year fulfilling prior to his departure.

He then spent eight years at several locations in Italy, copying the old masters and taking particular inspiration from Raphael. While there, he was one of a large group of artists chosen to provide decorations for Napoleon's visit at the Palazzo del Quirinale although, as it turned out, he never produced more than sketches. After that, he spent some time in Paris and received a Gold Medal from Napoleon. While there, he also worked with Godefroy Engelmann, one of the first lithographers in France.

An exhibition in Ghent two years later led to his appointment as court painter to King William I of the Netherlands in 1815. In this position, he began a campaign for the return of several major art works that had been looted from Bruges by the French Army; including pieces by Michelangelo, Jan van Eyck, Hans Memling, and Gerard David. In thanks for his successful efforts, the City Council of Bruges voted to award him a gold medal in 1816. He was elected a fourth class corresponding member living abroad of the Royal Institute of the Netherlands in 1816.

From 1825 to 1829, he painted several works in support of the Greek War of Independence, the most famous of which depicts English poet Lord Byron on his deathbed at Missolonghi, and styled himself "Joseph Dionysius Odevaere". He also wrote some treatises on art and was a regular, highly opinionated contributor to local periodicals.

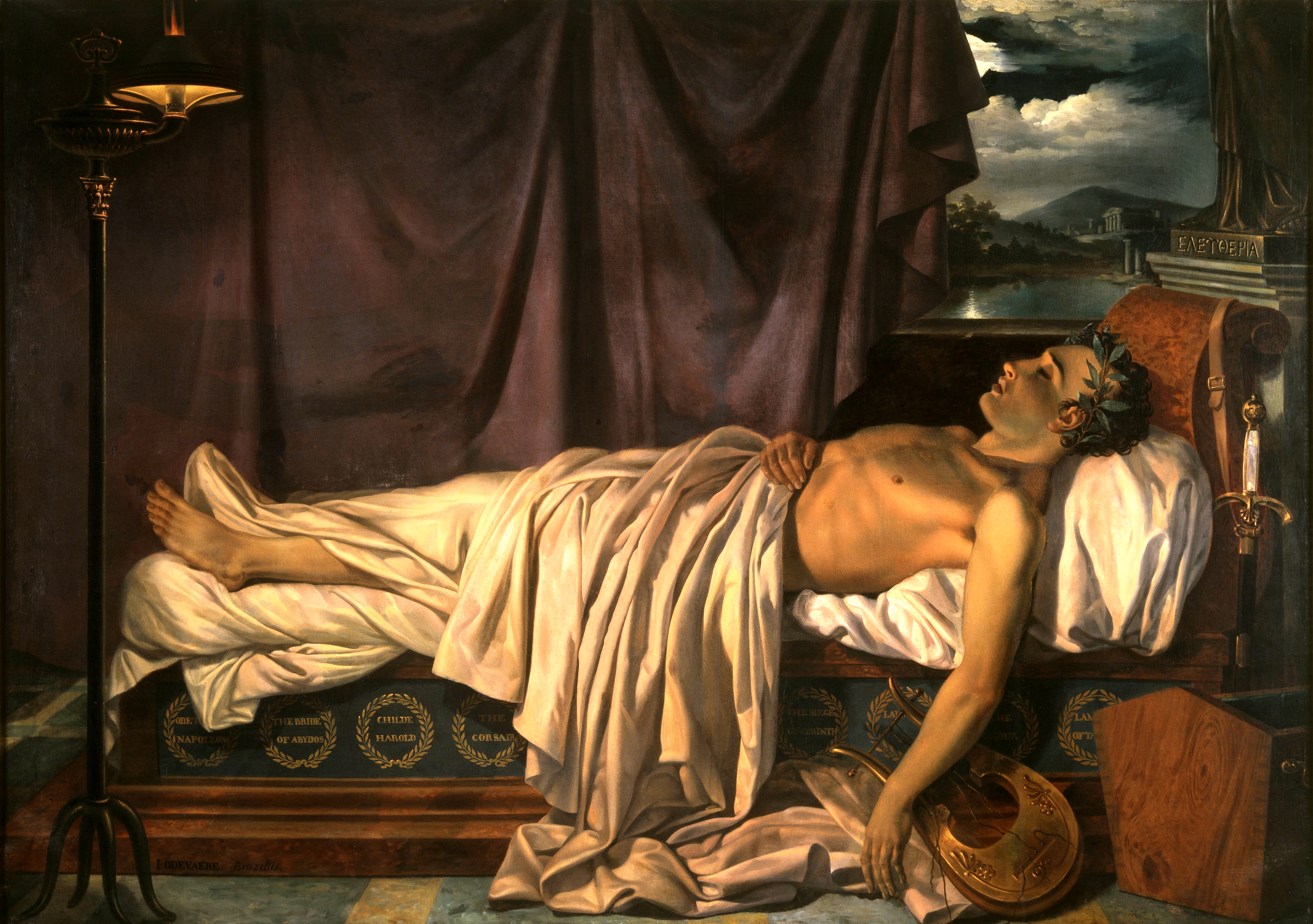
Lord Byron on His Deathbed (1826)

In 1818, he married Sylvie de la Rue (1796–1845). After his death, in 1835, she married Joseph Van der Linden, Secretary of the Provisional Government of Belgium.

He was a founding member of the first Société des douze.
