= Jean-Joseph Raepsaet =

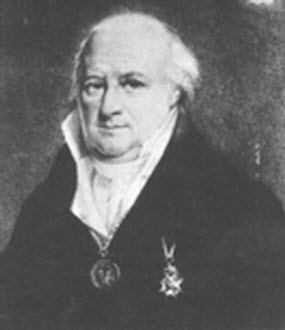

Jean-Joseph Raepsaet (29 December 1750 in Oudenaarde – 19 February 1832) was a Belgian politician and historian.

He was born to a family that had grown from rural civil servants in the south-east of the County of Flanders in the Austrian Netherlands in the Holy Roman Empire to the highest ranks of society. Raepsaet was the grandson of Jan Arent Raepsaet (1680-1752), scribe of Heestert, and Agnes Valcke. His father, Jan Raepsaet (died 1774) was the lawyer and clerk of the Castellany of Oudenaarde, and his mother was Maria Joanna Vispoel, daughter of the Grand Pensionary of Oudenaarde.

Raepsaet went to school in Oudenaarde and high school in Menen and Bergen. He studied philosophy and law at the University of Louvain, where he received his degree in law on 17 December 1772. A month later, on 16 January 1773, he became a lawyer at the Council of Flanders. He settled down in his hometown and became clerk of the chancellery.

He became one of the leading voices of the conservative party in Oudenaarde, and he disputed the reformations of Joseph II of the Holy Roman Emperor, while at the same time supporting the closing of several monasteries and the abolition of hermitages.

On 20 May 1777, Jean-Joseph Raepsaet married Maria Olympa Bauwens, daughter of another high-ranking official from Oudenaarde, in Antwerp. Together they had seventeen children, of whom six died before reaching adulthood. Of the twelve that remained, six didn't marry, and the remaining six only had a modest number of children which, combined with the division of the inheritance between the many children, caused the name of Raepsaet to disappear from high society.
