= Jean-Baptiste Bory de Saint-Vincent =

French soldier and scientist (1778-1846)

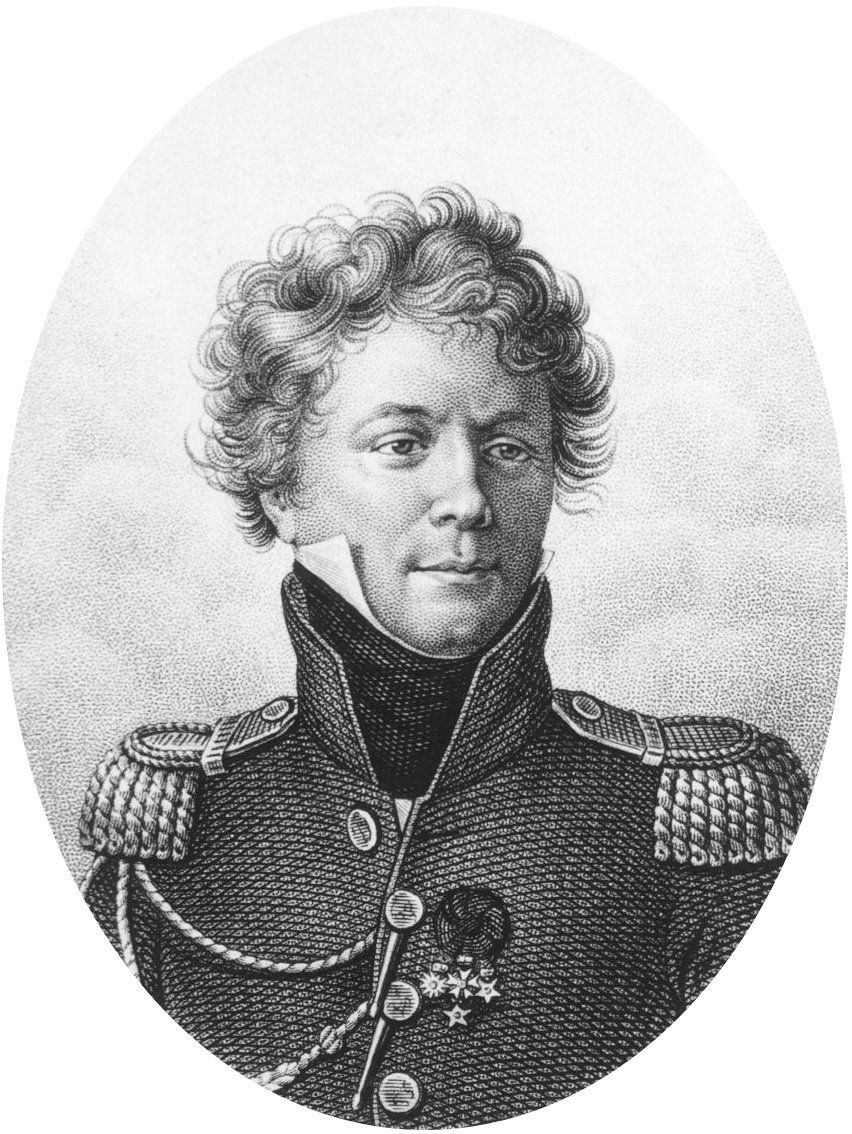
- Born: 6 July 1778; Agen, Kingdom of France
- Died: 22 December 1846 (aged 68); Paris, Kingdom of France
- Military career
- Rank: Colonel (1814)
- Commands: Scientific Expeditions: In the African Oceans (1800); Expedition of Morea (1829); Expedition in Algeria (1839)
- Conflicts: French Revolutionary Wars; Napoleonic Wars
- Awards: Chevalier of the Legion of Honor (1811) Officer of the Legion of Honor (1831)
- Other work: Naturalist; Geographer; Botanist; Volcanologist; Correspondent of the National Museum of Natural History; Member of the French Academy of Sciences; Deputy: Chamber of the Hundred-Days (15 May – 13 July 1815); Chamber of the July Monarchy (5 July – 19 August 1831)

Jean-Baptiste Geneviève Marcellin Bory de Saint-Vincent (Note: His full name is reported variously as Jean Baptiste George-Marie Bory de Saint-Vincent, Jean Baptiste George Marie Bory de Saint-Vincent, Jean Baptiste Marcellin Bory de Saint-Vincent, and Jean-Baptiste Geneviève Marcellin.) was a French naturalist, army officer and politician. He was born on 6 July 1778 in Agen (Lot-et-Garonne) and died on 22 December 1846 in Paris. Biologist and geographer, he was particularly interested in volcanology, systematics and botany. The standard author abbreviation Bory is used to indicate this person as the author when citing a botanical name.

== Life ==
=== Youth ===
Jean-Baptiste Bory de Saint Vincent was born at Agen on 6 July 1778. His parents were Géraud Bory de Saint-Vincent and Madeleine de Journu; his father's family were petty nobility who played important roles at the bar and in the judiciary, during and after the French Revolution. Instilled with sentiments hostile to the revolution from childhood, he studied first at the college of Agen, then with his uncle Journu-Auber in Bordeaux in 1787. He may have attended courses in medicine and surgery from 1791 to 1793. During the Reign of Terror in 1793, his family was persecuted and took refuge in the Landes.

In 1794, as a precocious naturalist, aged 15, Bory was instrumental in freeing from prison the entomologist Pierre André Latreille, whose early work he had read, and in saving Latreille from deportation to the penal colony of Cayenne. (Note: the ship Le Républicain, which was to transport him to French Guiana, sank in front of the Cordouan lighthouse with all prisoners aboard.) Latreille later became one of the leading entomologists of his time; he and Bory remained lifelong friends. A student of geologist and mineralogist Déodat Gratet de Dolomieu at the Paris School of Mines, Bory sent his first scholarly publications to the Academy of Bordeaux the same year, and consequently came into contact with many established naturalists.

After the death of his father, he joined the French Revolutionary armies in 1799. Thanks to the recommendation of Jean-Gérard Lacuée, also from Agen, he was soon appointed second lieutenant. He served first in the Army of the West, then in the Army of the Rhine under the orders of General Jean Victor Marie Moreau. He was then assigned to Brittany and moved to Rennes; it was at this time that he acquired his Bonapartist sentiments.

=== First expeditions in the oceans of Africa ===
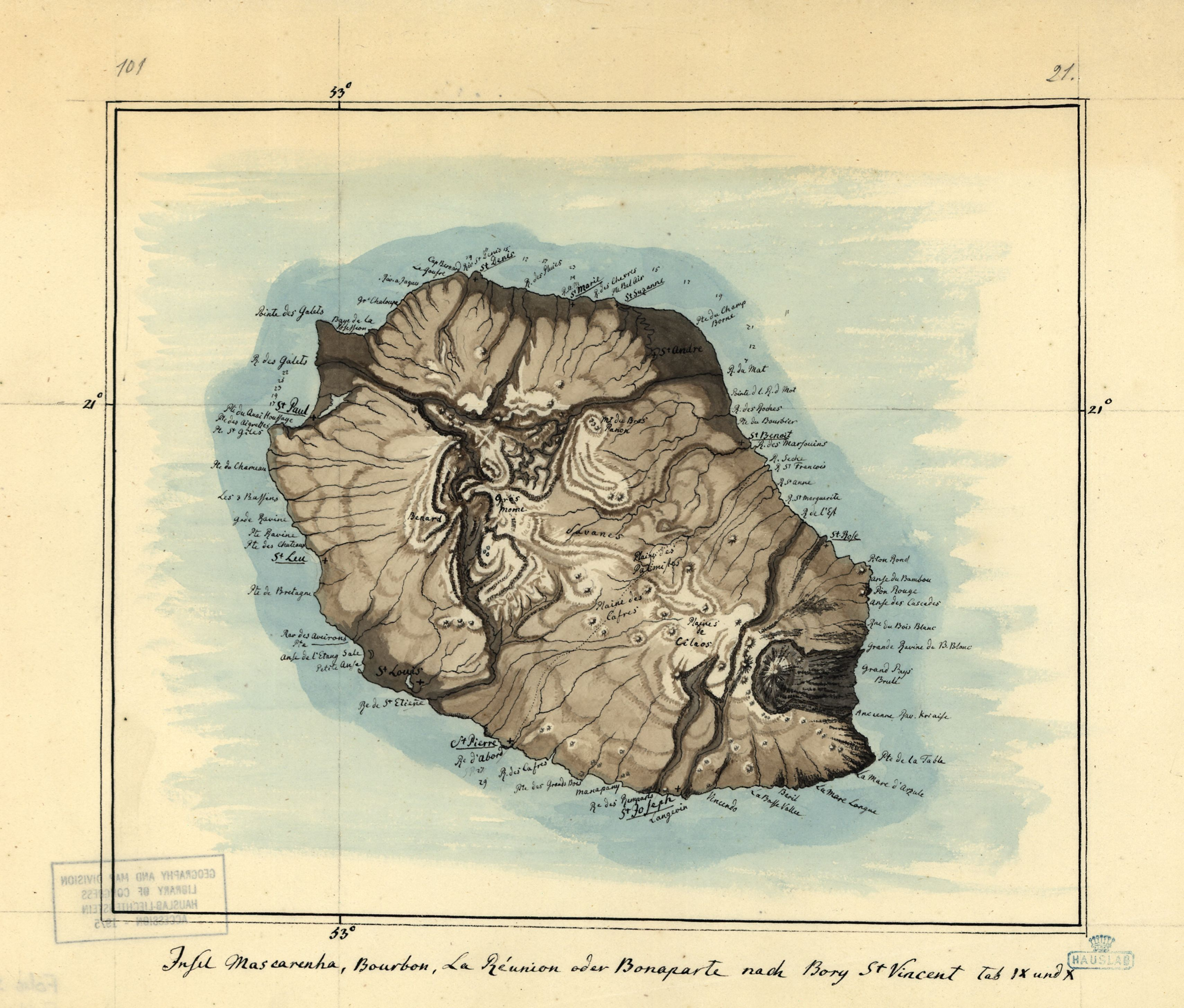
Map of the Réunion island drawn in 1802 by Bory de Saint-Vincent.

In 1799, Bory learned about the upcoming departure of a scientific expedition to Australia organized by the government and obtained, thanks to his uncle and to the famous naturalist Bernard-Germain de Lacépède, the position of chief botanist aboard one of the three participating corvettes. Thus, after having left the Army of the West at the end of August and receiving from the Ministry of War an indefinite leave, Bory left Paris on 30 September and embarked in Le Havre on 19 October 1799 aboard the corvette commanded by Captain Nicolas Baudin, Le Naturaliste.

After several stops in Madeira, the Canary islands, and Cape Verde and then rounding the Cape of Good Hope, towards the middle of the trip Bory suddenly left the ship of Captain Baudin with whom he was in conflict and explored alone (and with limited resources) several islands of the African seas. He visited Mauritius in March 1800 during a stopover. From there, he sailed to the neighboring island of Réunion, where in October 1801 he ascended the Piton de la Fournaise, the active volcano of the island, and wrote the first general scientific description of it. He gave the name of his former professor Dolomieu, of whose death he had just learned, to one of the craters he described as a mamelon. He gave his own name to the summit crater, the Bory crater. On the way back, he continued his geographical, physical and botanical explorations on the island of Saint Helena

Bory was back in France by 11 July 1802 and learned that his mother had died during his absence. He published his Essai sur les Îles Fortunées (Essay on the archipelago of the Canary islands), which earned him his election first as correspondent of the National Museum of Natural History in August 1803, and later as correspondent first class of the Institut de France (division of Physical Sciences) in the spring of 1808. In 1804, he published his Voyage dans les quatre principales îles des mers d'Afrique.

=== Military campaigns ===
Following his return, he resumed service in the army and, promoted to captain, he was transferred to the 5th Dragoon Regiment of cavalry, in the 3rd Army Corps of Marshal Davout, of which he became assistant staff captain on 3 October 1804. He was then assigned to the Camp of Boulogne for the creation of Emperor Napoleon I's Grande Armée.

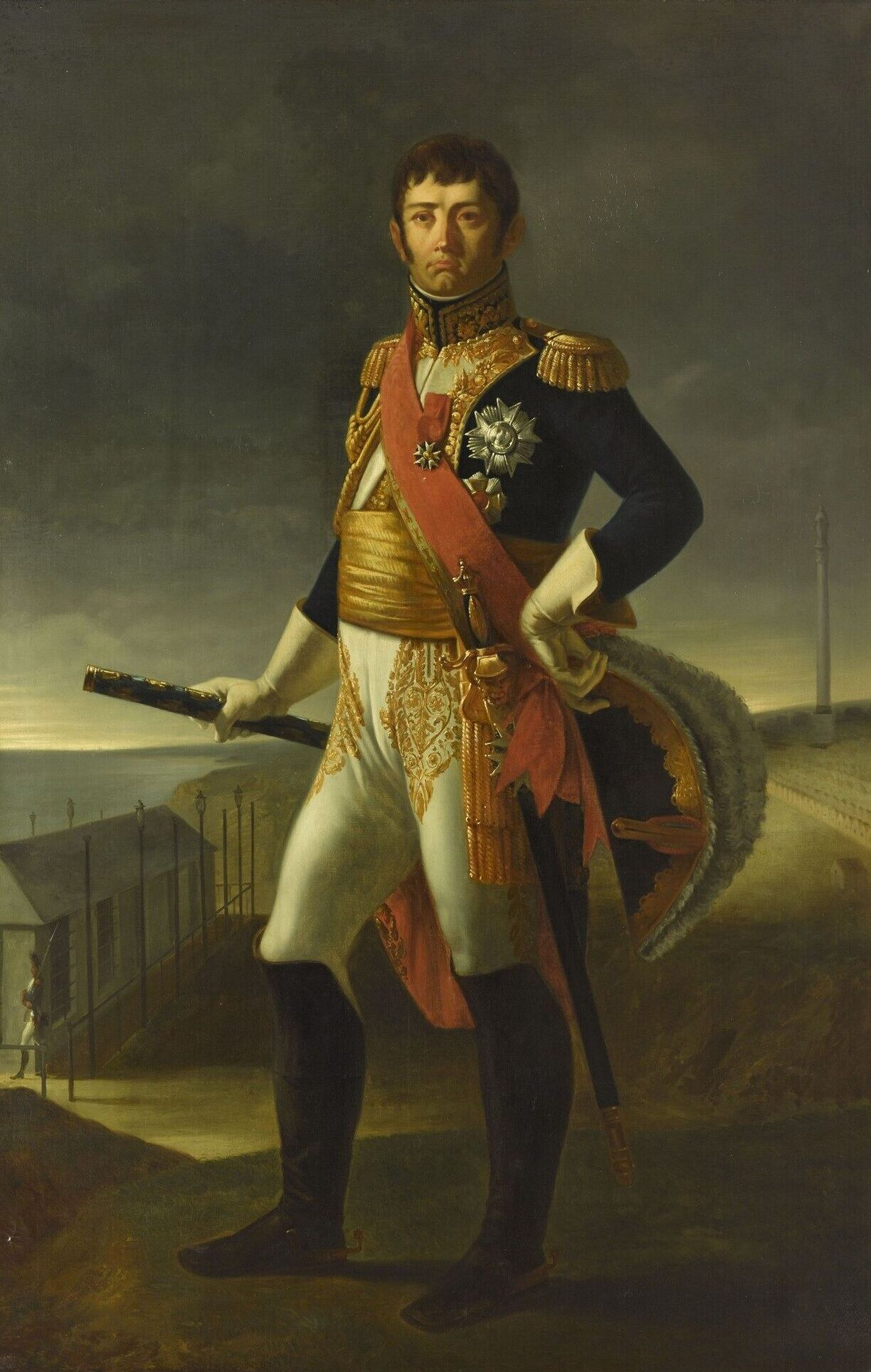
Marshal Jean-de-Dieu Soult, protector of Bory de Saint-Vincent, under whose orders he served from 1809, and who appointed him colonel in 1814

From 1805 to 1814, Bory followed the greater part of Napoleon's campaigns within the Grande Armée. In 1805, he took part in the campaign of Austria as captain of dragoons and was present at the Battle of Ulm (15-20 October 1805) and at the Battle of Austerlitz (2 December 1805). Captain Bory then spent two years in Prussia and Poland and fought at the Battle of Jena (14 October 1806) and at the Battle of Friedland (14 June 1807). He continued drawing military maps of Franconia and Swabia and during his visits to Bavaria, Vienna and Berlin, where he found his own works translated into German, he took the opportunity to meet several scientists including the botanists Nikolaus Joseph von Jacquin and Carl Ludwig Willdenow, who received him with open arms and presented him with valuable gifts. In October 1808, he served on the staff of Marshal Ney, which he soon left to be attached to Marshal Soult, Duke of Dalmatia, as aide-de-camp, in October 1809. Having been promoted to major, Bory was mainly involved in military reconnaissance thanks to his skills in graphic work. From 1809 to 1813, he took part in the French campaign of Spain and distinguished himself at the Siege of Badajoz in the spring of 1811, at the Battle of Quebara and at the Battle of Albuera (16 May 1811). Events having placed him at the head of the troops that formed the garrison of Agen, he found himself commanding soldiers from his hometown for about two weeks. In May 1811, he became squadron leader and was then appointed Knight of the Legion of Honor and attained the rank of lieutenant colonel by the end of the year.

Alongside Soult, Bory hastily left Spain to take part to the German campaign and participate in the Battle of Lützen (2 May 1813) and in the Battle of Bautzen (20-21 May 1813). After these victories, he returned to his homeland for the campaign of France of 1814 and fought at the Battle of Orthez (27 February 1814). He also took part in the Battle of Toulouse (10 April 1814), and on the following day organized troops of partisans and scouts in his own region of Agen. After the first abdication of Napoleon I in April 1814 and his exile to the island of Elba, of which Bory learned at Agen on 13 April 1814, he went to Paris.

Marshal Soult, rallying to the new government and having been appointed Minister of War, summoned Bory to his staff and appointed him to the rank of colonel. He also offered Bory, on 10 October 1814, the service of the ministry's Dépôt de la Guerre (a depository of maps and archives), to which his topographic work entitled him. He remained there until his proscription on 25 July 1815. Bory worked on scientific and literary works as well, and took part in the writing of the satirical liberal, anti-monarchist and pro-Bonapartist newspaper, the Nain Jaune.

=== Political exile ===
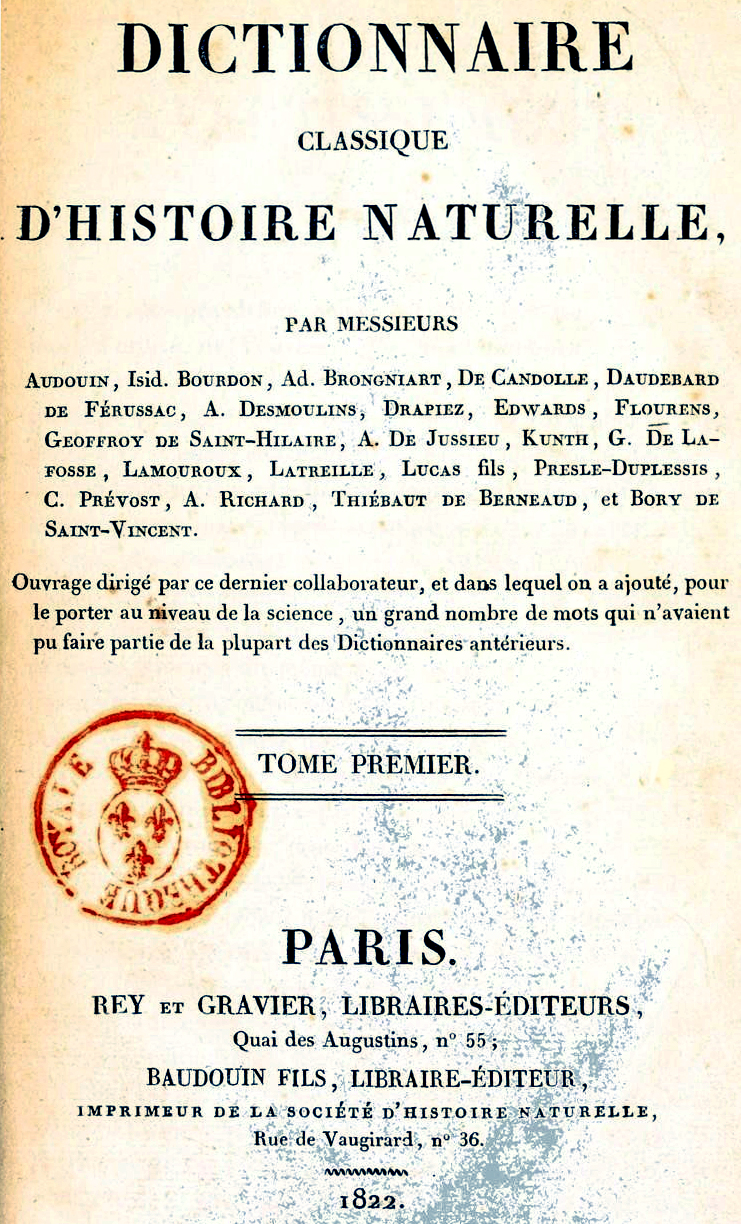
The Classical Dictionary of Natural History in 17 volumes (1822), directed by Bory de Saint-Vincent. He published it, back in Paris, after 5 years of exile (1815-1820).

On the return of Napoleon from exile, Bory was elected by the college of the department of Lot-et-Garonne, on 16 May 1815, to the office of representative of Agen at the Chamber of the Hundred Days and sat with the liberals. (Note: Bory de Saint-Vincent is deputy of Lot-et-Garonne at the Chamber of the Hundred Days from 15 May 1815 to 13 July 1815. (Biography of Jean-Baptiste Bory de Saint-Vincent in the website of the French National Assembly: http://www2.assemblee-nationale.fr/sycomore/fiche/(num_dept)/16507)) He proclaimed the constitution, gave a resounding speech before the tribune, and virulently opposed the Minister of Police, Joseph Fouché, Duke of Otranto.

Absent at Waterloo, his mandate as deputy confining him to the legislative body, he saw the abdication of Napoleon I and the return of King Louis XVIII. Placed by Fouché on the lists of proscription by the Ordonnance of 24 July 1815, which condemned 57 persons for having served Napoleon during the Hundred Days after having pledged allegiance to Louis XVIII, Bory first took refuge in the valley of Montmorency, from where, hidden, he published his Justification de la conduite et des opinions de M. Bory de Saint-Vincent. Then, the amnesty law of 12 January 1816 was proclaimed by the King, condemning Bory to exile, and he went to Liège under a false name. First invited by the King of Prussia (thanks to Bory's friendship with the naturalist Alexander von Humboldt) to stay in Berlin, then in Aachen, he was expelled after eighteen months. He refused to submit to the decision which assigned him to Königsberg or Prague for his residence, and when he was offered a commission as General in Bolívar's new Republic of Colombia by botanist and friend (and vice-president) Francisco Antonio Zea, he declined. He finally managed to reach Holland, disguised as a brandy merchant and with a false passport, then Brussels, where he met Emmanuel Joseph Sieyès and where he lived until 1820. With Auguste Drapiez and Jean-Baptiste Van Mons, he founded and became one of the scientific directors of the Annales générales des Sciences physiques, edited in Brussels by the printer Weissenbruch from 1819 to 1821. The articles, written by international scientific luminaries, were illustrated with lithographs printed first by Duval de Mercourt and then by Marcellin Jobard.

On 1 January 1820, Bory was finally allowed to return to France. Dismissed from the army and deprived of pay, he returned to Paris where he lived until 1825. He was obliged to devote himself entirely to editorial work (on his Annales of Brussels in particular) and he collaborated with various liberal newspapers, including the Courrier français, which reserved for him the drafting of the reports on the sessions of the Chamber of Deputies. He gave up later, when, devoting himself entirely to science, he found in the many books he was selling to booksellers an honorable means of livelihood. However, in 1823, he fought a duel with a pistol and was wounded in the foot, and, in 1825, he was thrown in prison at Sainte-Pélagie for debts, where he remained until 1827. (Note: In order to alleviate his discomfiture, Bory's colleagues at the Museum of Natural History had introduced a new "tradition": they were bringing Zarafa, the giraffe presented to King Charles X by Muhammad Ali of Egypt (and newly received in France in 1826) up the Coypeau Hill (the labyrinth) to the Jardin des Plantes. Bory, warned about this attention, was climbing up to the roof of the neighboring Sainte-Pélagie Prison, equipped with its telescope, in order to study it. Muhammad Ali of Egypt) (Note: Despite the lively protests of Bory who wanted to stay in Ste-Pelagie until the end of his sentence (he was not complaining at all about his treatment in this philosophical asylum, living well, eating a lot, sleeping marvelously and receiving his friends for dinner, including Geoffroy Saint-Hilaire or his daughter Augustine, around a garbure landaise...), his future son-in-law Mr. Morel secretly bought back his debts from his usurers, allowing him to be released and to be able to accompany his daughter Augustine to the altar. (in Bory de Saint-Vincent, Correspondance, published and annotated by Philippe Lauzun, Maison d'édition et imprimerie moderne, 1908.))

It was during this productive period in 1822, that Bory, along with most of the scientists of his time, including Arago, Brongniart, Drapiez, Geoffroy de Saint-Hilaire, von Humboldt, de Jussieu, de Lacépède, Latreille, etc., began the writing of one of his greatest works, the Dictionnaire classique d'histoire naturelle en 17 volumes (1822-1831).

=== Scientific Expedition to Morea (1829) ===
A war of Independence had been raging in Greece since 1821, but the Greek victories were short-lived and the Turkish-Egyptian troops had reconquered the Peloponnese in 1825. King Charles X, supported by a strong current of philhellenism, decided to intervene alongside the Greek insurgents. After the naval Battle of Navarino (20 October 1827), which saw the annihilation of the Turkish-Egyptian fleet by the Allied Franco-Russo-British fleet, a French expeditionary force of 15,000 men landed in the south-west of the Peloponnese in August 1828. The purpose of the Expédition de Morée was to liberate the area from the Turkish-Egyptian occupation forces and return it to the young independent Greek state; this would be accomplished in just one month.

Towards the end of the year 1828, the Viscount of Martignac, Interior minister of King Charles X and the real head of the government at that time (as well as being a childhood friend of Bory in Bordeaux), charged six academicians of the Institute de France (Georges Cuvier, Étienne Geoffroy Saint-Hilaire, Charles-Benoît Hase, Desiré-Raoul Rochette, Jean-Nicolas Hyot and Jean-Antoine Letronne) with appointing the chief-officers and members of each section of a scientific committee to be attached to the Morea expedition, just as had been done previously with the Commission of Sciences and Arts during Napoleon's campaign in Egypt. Bory was thus appointed director of the commission. The minister and the academicians also determined the routes and objectives. Bory wrote, "Messrs. De Martignac and Siméon had asked me expressly not to restrict my observations to Flies and Herbs, but to extend them to places and to men later..." .

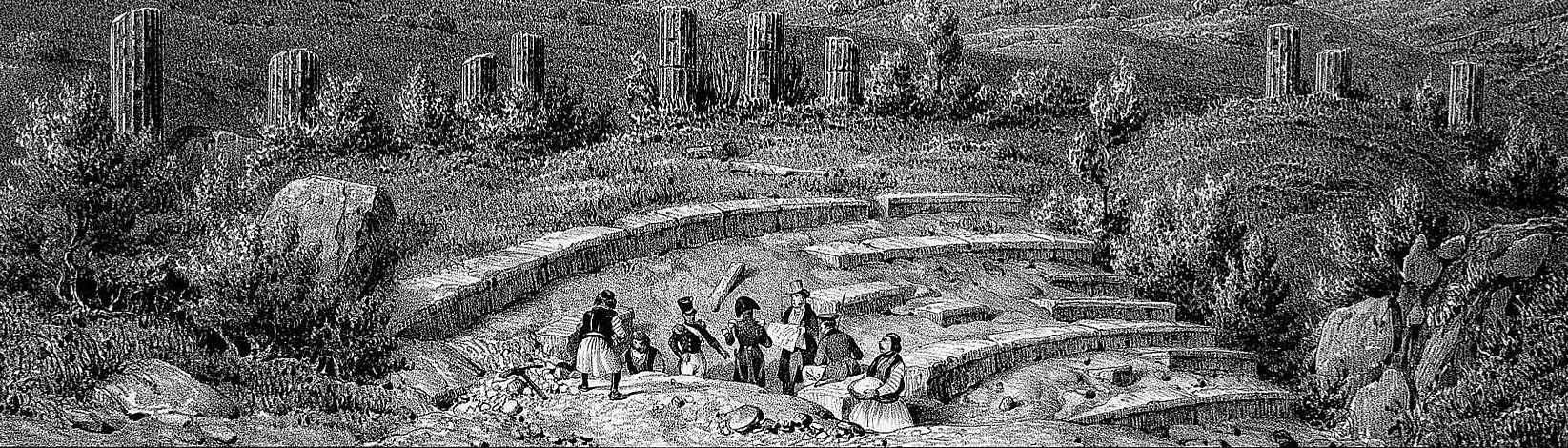
Bory de Saint-Vincent and the members of the scientific commission of the Morea Expedition studying the ruins of the stadium of ancient Messene (detail of a lithograph by Prosper Baccuet)

Bory and his team of 19 scientists (including Edgar Quinet, Abel Blouet and Pierre Peytier) representing various scientific disciplines, such as natural history and antiquities (archaeology, architecture and sculpture) disembarked from the frigate Cybèle at Navarino on 3 March 1829 and there joined General Nicolas Joseph Maison, who was commanding the French expeditionary force. Bory then met General Antoine Simon Durrieu, chief of staff of the expedition, who was also from the Landes region and with whom Bory had been connected for a decade. Bory stayed in Greece for 8 months, until November 1829, and explored the Peloponnese, Attica and the Cyclades The scientific work of the commission was of major importance to the increase knowledge of the country. The topographic maps they produced, which were widely acknowledged, were of an unprecedented high quality and surveys, drawings, cuts, plans and proposals for the theoretical restoration of the monuments were a new attempt to systematically and exhaustively catalogue the ancient Greek vestiges. The Morea expedition and its scientific publications offered a near complete description of the regions visited and formed a scientific, aesthetic and human inventory that remained for a long time one of the best achieved about Greece. Bory registered all the results of his research and published them later in his major opus of 1832.

=== Academic and political career ===
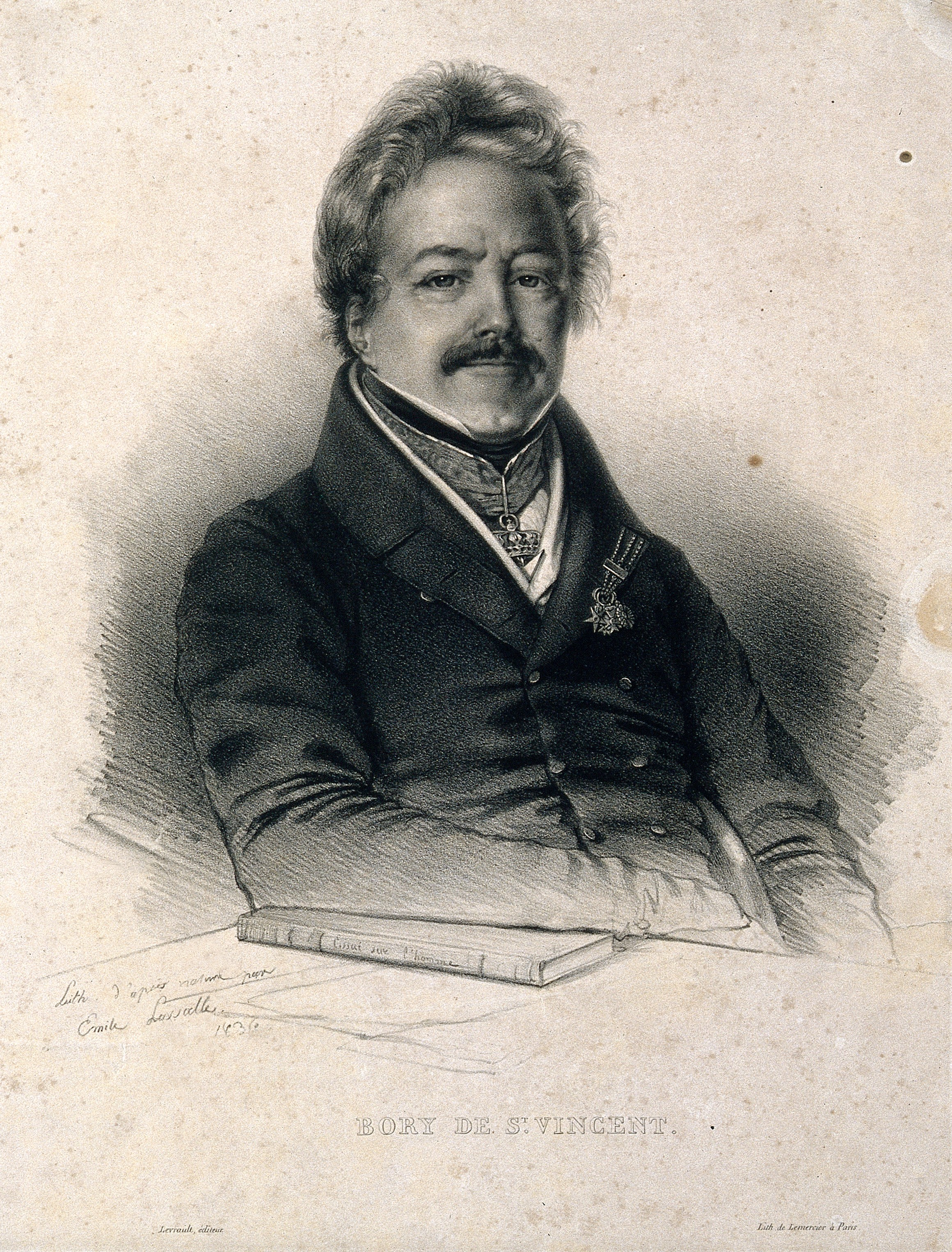
Portrait of the Colonel and Academician Bory de Saint-Vincent in 1834 (by Émile Lassalle).

After his return from Greece, Bory pursued his scholarly career; in 1830, he presented his candidacy at the Institute de France for the vacant seat left by the death of Jean-Baptiste de Lamarck, obtaining the votes of Arago, Cuvier, Fourier and Thénard among others. He also participated in the founding of the Entomological Society of France, the oldest entomological society in the world, on 29 February 1832, alongside his old friend Pierre-André Latreille.

In 1830, while Bory was occupied writing his work on Morea (by ministry order), the July Ordinances promulgated by King Charles X to obtain elections more favorable to the Ultra-royalists, and which suspended freedom of the press, revived his political sentiments. He fought on the barricades of the Faubourg Saint-Germain and was first at the Hôtel de Ville. After these Three Glorious [Days] (the July Revolution) and the new appointment of Marshal Soult to the Ministry of War on 3 November 1830, Bory was finally, after 15 years, reinstated in the army, to his former rank of Colonel with the General Staff and to his post at the war depository, which he had held in 1815. He remained there throughout the course of the July Monarchy (1830-1848) until 1842, four years before his death. On 1 May 1831, Bory was appointed Officer of the Legion of Honor.

Around the same time, on 5 July 1831, Bory was elected (Note: with 298 votes, against 248 for his competitor, for a total of 554 votes and 178 abstentions.) deputy of the 3rd college of Lot-et-Garonne (Marmande) to replace his friend the Viscount of Martignac. (Note: Bory de Saint-Vincent is deputy of Lot-et-Garonne at the Chamber of deputies (2nd legislature) of the July Monarchy from 5 July 1831 to 19 August 1831. (Biography of Jean-Baptiste Bory de Saint-Vincent in the website of the French National Assembly: http://www2.assemblee-nationale.fr/sycomore/fiche/(num_dept)/16507)) In his profession of faith, he denounced the hereditary titles of the peerage, which he declared to be contradictory to the principle of equality before the law, spoke against the incompatibility of the legislature's mandate with a public function, and advocated for the revision of the municipal, electoral and national guard laws. The conservative tendencies of the majority forced him, after only two months in that position, to resign as deputy on 19 August 1831. He was replaced in October by Monsieur de Martignac.

In 1832, Bory published the report of his exploration in Greece in his work, the Relation du voyage de la commission scientifique de Morée dans le Péloponnèse, les Cyclades et l'Attique, for which he received many accolades, and which allowed him to be finally elected a member of the French Academy of Sciences on 17 November 1834.

=== Scientific Expedition of Algeria (1839) ===
Between 1835 and 1838, Bory sat on the General Staff commission and republished his Justifications of 1815 under the title of Mémoires in 1838. On 24 August 1839, a commission of scientific exploration of Algeria (Commission d'exploration scientifique d'Algérie) on the model of those which were put in place in Egypt (1798) and in Morea (1829), was designed for the newly conquered, but not yet pacified Algeria. Bory de Saint-Vincent, who had been one of its promoters, became its president as a staff Colonel and went there, accompanied by his collaborators, to conduct his identifications, researches, samplings and scientific explorations. He arrived in the first days of January 1840 in Algiers and visited other cities of the coast. He left Algeria in the first trimester of 1842. Bory published numerous books on the country, such as Notice sur la commission exploratrice et scientifique d'Algérie (1838), Sur la flore de l'Algérie (1843), Sur l'anthropologie de l'Afrique française (1845) and the Exploration scientifique de l'Algérie pendant les années 1840, 1841, 1842. Sciences physiques (1846-1867).

=== Last years ===
Although sick, Bory was still thinking about making a trip to the islands of the Indian Ocean or to Algeria. He died, however, on 22 December 1846, at the age of sixty-eight, of a heart attack, in his apartment on the 5th floor, 6 rue de Bussy in Paris. He left behind him only debts and his herbarium, which was sold the following year. He was buried in the Père-Lachaise Cemetery (49th Division).

An indefatigable worker, Bory wrote on several branches of natural history, including the study of reptiles, fish, microscopic animals, plants, cryptogams, etc. He was the main editor of the Bibliothèque physico-économique, of the Dictionnaire classique d'histoire naturelle en 7 volumes and of the scientific part of the Expédition de Morée. He participated in composing for the Encyclopédie Méthodique the sections concerning the zoophytes and the worms, as well as for the volumes of the physical geography and atlas that accompanied them. He also wrote well-composed geographical summaries, especially the one concerning Spain, and contributed many articles notable for the originality of their ideas to the Encyclopédie moderne.

Bory was a proponent of the theory of the transmutation of species alongside, among others, Jean-Baptiste de Lamarck. According to historian Adrian Desmond Bory was a leading anti-Cuvierian materialist who blended the best of Lamarck's philosophy with Geoffroy's higher anatomy. His Dictionnaire classique d'histoire naturelle already contained information about Lamarck and the species debate, and is notable for a copy of it having been carried by Charles Darwin on the Beagle.

Bory was also a fervent defender of spontaneous generation (theme of the famous controversy between Louis Pasteur and Félix Archimède Pouchet) and an ardent polygenist. He thought that the different human "races", according to the sense of the time, were true species, each having its own origin and history. He was finally a notorious opponent of slavery; Victor Schœlcher quotes him among his scientific allies in favor of abolition.

== Toponymy ==
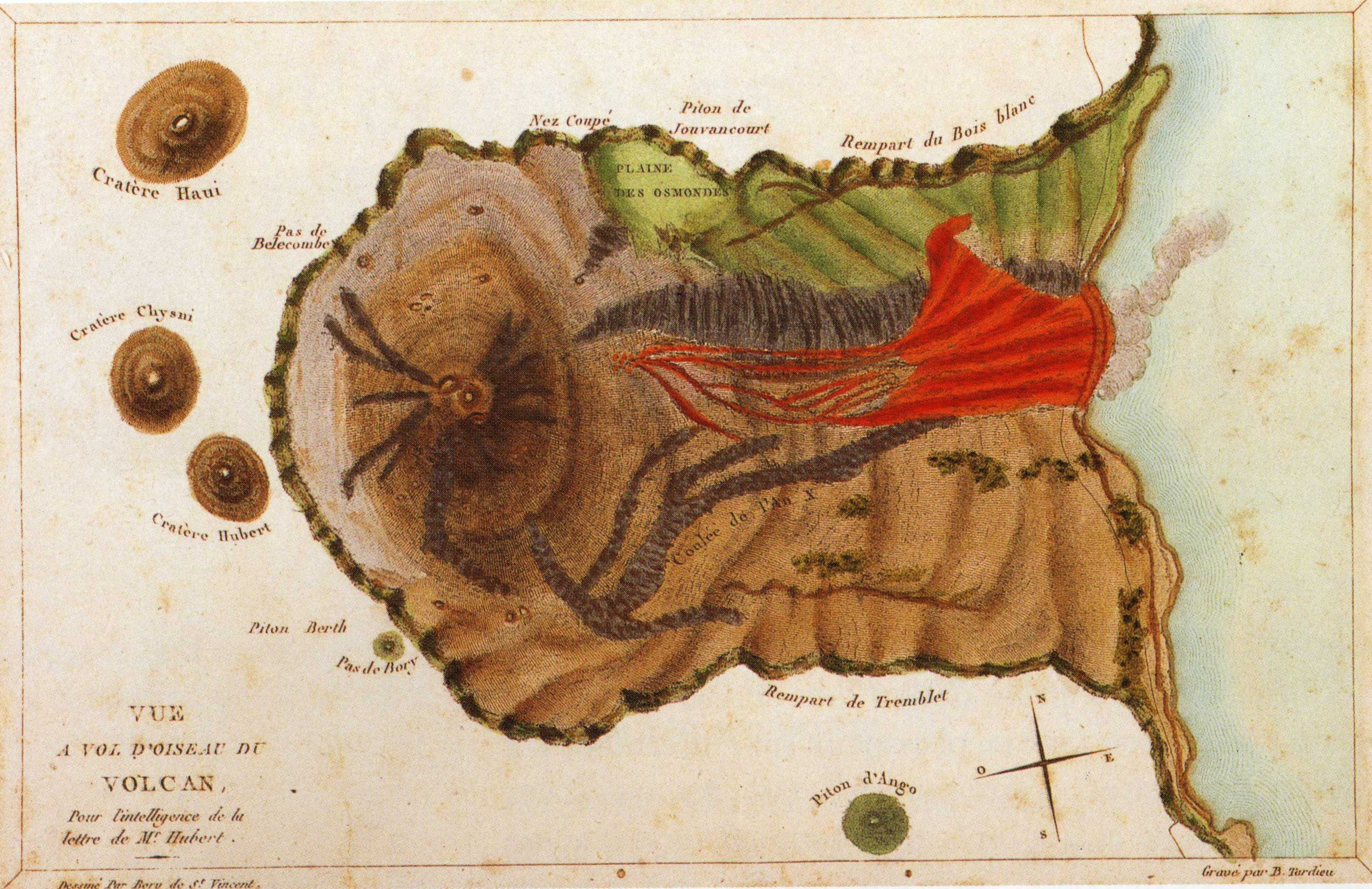
Volcano Piton de la Fournaise on the island of Réunion, drawn in 1802 by Bory de Saint-Vincent.

- In tribute to Bory's pioneering exploration of the volcano, one of the two summit craters of Piton de la Fournaise on the island of Réunion was named the Bory crater by his companion de Jouvancourt during their ascent of the volcano in 1801.
- A Primary school was named after him in Saint Denis (La Réunion) (École primaire publique Bory de Saint Vincent).
- A College was named after him in Saint Philippe (La Réunion) (Collège Bory de Saint-Vincent).
- Streets were named after Bory in Saint-Pierre (La Réunion) and in his hometown of Agen (Lot-et-Garonne).

== Private life ==
In September 1802, at Rennes where he was garrisoned, Bory married Anne-Charlotte Delacroix of la Thébaudais, with whom he had two daughters: Clotilde, born on 7 February 1801, and Augustine, born on 25 May 1803, whom he called "his little Antigone" and with whom he remained very close all his life. His marriage, "contracted too young to be a happy one" did not last. His wife died in 1823, after their separation.

When he was proscribed by the Ordonnance of 24 July 1815 and was fleeing to Rouen, he met the actress Maria Gros. She followed him throughout his exile between 1815 and 1820; they began to cohabitate in 1817. On 17 May 1818, their first daughter, Cassilda, was born. A second daughter, Athanalgide, was born on 22 July 1823, after the separation of her parents.

== Decorations and Honors ==
Chevalier de la Légion d'Honneur (Knight rank - May 1811)

Officier de la Légion d'Honneur (Officer rank - 1 May 1831)

== Publications ==
A complete list of Jean-Baptiste Bory de Saint-Vincent's publications can be found at the end of the introduction by Philippe Lauzun (pp. 52–55) in Bory de Saint-Vincent, Correspondence, published and annotated by Philippe Lauzun, Maison d'édition et imprimerie moderne, 1908. (Read online on Archive.org)

- 1803 : Essais sur Les Isles Fortunées et l'Antique Atlantide ou Précis de l'Histoire générale de l'Archipel des Canaries, an XI (on the website of the National Library of France)
- 1804 : Voyage dans les quatre principales îles des mers d'Afrique, Ténériffe, Maurice, Bourbon et Sainte-Hélène. - trois volumes complétés par un atlas.
- 1808 : Mémoires sur un genre nouveau de la cryptogamie aquatique, nommé Thorea, Mémoire sur le genre Lemanea de la famille des Conferves, Mémoire sur le genre Batrachosperma de la famille des Conferves, Mémoire sur le genre Draparnaldia de la famille des Conferves . Paris, Belin. (on Google books)
- 1808 : Mémoire sur les forêts souterraines de Wolfesck en haute Autriche, Berlin, Gesell. Nat. Freunde Mag. II, p. 295-302.
- 1809 : Mémoire sur le genre Lemanea de la famille des Conferves, Berlin Gesell. Nat. Freunde Mag. III, p. 274-281.
- 1815 : Chambre des représentants, Rapport fait à la Chambre des représentants par M. Bory de Saint-Vincent, au nom des députés à l'armée, séance du 1er juillet 1815. in-8°, Paris, imprimerie de la Chambre des représentants.
- 1815 : Justification de la conduite et des opinions de M. Bory de Saint-Vincent, membre de la chambre des représentants et proscrit par l'ordonnance du 24 juillet 1815 , Paris, Chez les marchands de nouveautés (ou Paris, chez Eymery, août 1815), 110 p. (on Google books)
- 1816 : Lamuel ou le livre du Seigneur, dédié à M. de Chateaubriand, traduction d'un manuscrit hébreu exhumé de la bibliothèque ci-devant impériale. Histoire authentique de l'Empereur Appolyon et du roi Béhémot par le très Saint-Esprit, Liège et Paris, P. J. Collardin, Frères Michau, in-18°, 232 p.
- 1819-1821 (de juillet 1819 à juin 1821) : Annales générales des sciences physiques, par MM. Bory de Saint-Vincent, Pierre Auguste Joseph Drapiez et Jean-Baptiste Van Mons, 8 vol., Bruxelles, Weissenbruch. (on Google books)
- 1819 : Description du plateau de Saint-Pierre de Maestricht, Chez Weissenbruch, imprimeur du roi et de la ville, rue du musée, n°. 1057, Bruxelles
- 1821 : Voyage souterrain, ou, Description du plateau de Saint-Pierre de Maestricht et de ses vastes cryptes, Ponthieu libraire Palais-Royal, Galerie de bois no. 252, Paris.
- 1822-1831 : Dictionnaire classique d'histoire naturelle, par Messieurs Audoin, Bourdon, Brongniart, de Candolle, Daudebard de Férussac, Desmoulins, Drapiez, Edwards, Flourens, Geoffroy de Saint-Hilaire, Jussieu, Kunth, de Lafosse, Lamouroux, Latreille, Lucas fils, Presles-Duplessis, Prévost, Richard, Thiébaut de Bernard. Ouvrage dirigé par Bory de Saint-Vincent, Paris, Rey et Gravier, Baudouin frères, 1822-1831, 17 volumes in-8, 160 planches gravées et coloriées. (on the website of the National Library of France)
- 1823 : Guide du voyageur en Espagne, Librairie Louis Jouanet, Paris, 1823. (on the website of the National Library of France)
- 1823 : Discours préliminaire à Histoire de la Grèce : description des Îles ioniennes, éditions Dondey-Dupré Paris, 1823. (on Google books)
- 1823-1832 : Encyclopédie moderne, ou dictionnaire abrégé des hommes et des choses, des sciences, des lettres et des arts, avec l'indication des ouvrages ou les divers sujets sont développés et approfondis par Eustache-Marie Courtin, Paris, Lejeune.
- 1824 : Tableau encyclopédique et méthodique des trois règnes de la nature, contenant l'Helminthologie ou les vers infusoires, les vers intestinaux, les vers mollusques, etc. En quatre volumes : vol.1, 1791, (p. 1 à 189) par Bruguière chez Panckoucke; vol.2, 1797, (p. 190 à 286) chez Agasse; vol.3, an VI (1797), (p. 287-390) par Lamarck chez Agasse; vol.4, 1816, (p. 391 à 488) par Lamarck; vingt-troisième partie, mollusques et polypes divers, par MM. Jean-Baptiste Lamarck, Jean-Guillaume Bruguiere, Jean-Baptiste Bory de Saint-Vincent, Isaac Lea, Dall William Healey, Otto Frederick Müller, Paris, chez Mme Veuve Agasse et Paris, Panckoucke, 1791-1824.
- 1825 : L'homme (homo), essai zoologique sur le genre humain, (extrait du DCHN), première édition, Paris, Le Normand Fils, 2 vol., vol.1 325p., vol.2 251p., In-8°. (on Archive.org)
- 1826-1830 : Voyage autour du monde, exécuté par ordre du Roi, sur la corvette de Sa Majesté, La Coquille, pendant les années 1822, 1823,1824 et 1825... Lesson, René-Primevère, Bory de Saint-Vincent, JBGM, Brongniart, Adolphe, Dumont d'Urville, Duperrey, Louis-Isidore, (Botanique par MM. Dumont d'Urville, Bory de Saint-Vincent et Ad. Brongniart), Paris, Arthus Bertrand. (on the website of the National Library of France)
- 1826 : Essai d'une classification des animaux microscopiques, imprimerie Mme Veuve Agasse, Paris, 1826. (on the website of the National Library of France)
- 1826 : Résumé géographique de la Péninsule Ibérique, éditions A. Dupont et Roret, Paris. (on the website of the National Library of France)
- 1827 : 2nd edition of Essai sur l'Homme.
- 1827-1831 : Bibliothèque physico-économique, instructive et amusante. Ou Journal des découvertes et perfectionnements de l'industrie nationale et étrangère, de l'économie rurale et domestique, de la physique, la chimie, l'histoire naturelle, la médecine domestique et vétérinaire, enfin des sciences et des arts qui se rattachent aux besoins de la vie, rédigée par Bory de Saint-Vincent et Julia-Fontenelle, Jean-Sébastien-Eugène, 1827-1831. Tome I (-X), Arthus Bertrand, Paris. 6 vol.
- 1830-1844 : Expédition d'Égypte. Histoire scientifique et militaire de l'Expédition française en Égypte J.B.G.M. Bory de Saint-Vincent - Paris, précédée d'une introduction présentant le tableau de l'Égypte ancienne et moderne d'Ali-Bey; et suivie du récit des événements survenus en ce pays depuis le départ des Français et sous le règne de Mohamed-Ali, d'après les mémoires, matériaux, documents inédits fournis par divers membres de l'expédition, dont Chateaugiron, Desgenettes, Dulertre, Larrey ... Rédaction réalisée par Étienne et Isidore Geoffroy Saint-Hilaire, Fortia d'Urban, Bory de Saint-Vincent, etc. 10 volumes in-8°, 2 volumes d'atlas, A.-J. Dénain, Paris.
- 1832-1838 : Expédition scientifique de Morée, Jean-Baptiste Bory de Saint-Vincent, Émile Le Puillon de Boblaye, Pierre Théodore Virlet d'Aoust, Étienne et Isidore Geoffroy de saint-hilaire, Gabriel Bibron, Gérard Paul Deshayes, Gaspard Auguste Brulle, Félix-Edouard Guerin-Meneville, Adolphe Brongniart, Louis-Anastase Chaubard, Commission scientifique de Morée; 4 vol. in 4° et atlas, Paris, Strasbourg, F.G. Levrault. 1832 : Travaux de la section des Sciences Physiques, tome 1, sous la direction de Bory de Saint-Vincent. 1832 : Cryptogamie, avec atlas de 38 pl., section des sciences Physiques (281-337), tome 3 partie 2.
- 1838 : Note sur la commission exploratrice et scientifique d'Algérie présentée à son Excellence le ministre de la guerre, (16 octobre 1838.) 20 pp; Imprimerie Cosson, Paris. (on the website of the National Library of France)
- 1845 : Sur l'anthropologie de l'Afrique française, lu à l'Académie royale des sciences dans sa séance du 30 juin 1845, Extrait du Magasin de zoologie, d'anatomie comparée et de paléontologie publié par M. Guérin-Méneville en octobre 1845, Paris, Imprimerie de Fain et Thunot, 19 p., pl.59 à 61.
- 1846-1867 : Exploration scientifique de l'Algérie (pendant les années 1840, 1841, 1842. Sciences physiques.) publiée par ordre du gouvernement. Sciences Naturelles, Botanique par MM. Bory de Saint-Vincent et Durieu de Maisoneuve, Paris, imprimerie impériale, Gide et Baudry, en 3 vol., in-fol., dont un atlas. (1846-1849) Vol. I, Flore d'Algérie. Cryptogamie, par Durieu de Maisoneuve, avec le concours de MM. Montagne, Bory de Saint-Vincent, L.-R., Tulasne, C. Tulasne, Leveille. Paris, imprimerie impériale, dans la collection Exploration scientifique de l'Algérie, publiée par ordre du Gouvernement, 600 p., 39 f. de pl. col. Vol. II Flore d'Algérie. Phanérogamie. Groupe des glumacées, par E. Cosson et Durieu de Maisonneuve. Vol. III Atlas.

== Bibliography ==
=== Cited sources ===
- Biography of Jean-Baptiste Bory de Saint-Vincent on the website of the French National Assembly: http://www2.assemblee-nationale.fr/sycomore/fiche/(num_dept)/16507
- Germain Sarrut and B. Saint-Edme, Biographie des hommes du jour: industriels..., Volume 2, page 79, Henri Krabbe, Paris, 1836. (Lire en ligne)
- Bory de Saint-Vincent, Correspondence, published and annotated by Philippe Lauzun, Maison d'édition et imprimerie moderne, 1908. (Lire en ligne)
- Wladimir Brunet de Presle and Alexandre Blanchet, La Grèce depuis la conquête romaine jusqu'à nos jours, Firmin Didot, Paris, 1860. (Lire en ligne)
- Georges Contogeorgis, Histoire de la Grèce, Hatier, coll. Nations d'Europe, Paris, 1992.
- Serge Briffaud, L'Expédition scientifique de Morée et le paysage méditerranéen. in L'invention scientifique de la Méditerranée, p. 293.
- Marie-Noëlle Bourguet, Bernard Lepetit, Daniel Nordman, Maroula Sinarellis, L'Invention scientifique de la Méditerranée. Égypte, Morée, Algérie., Éditions de l'EHESS, 1998. (ISBN 2-7132-1237-5)
- Olga Polychronopoulou, Archéologues sur les pas d'Homère. La naissance de la protohistoire égéenne., Noêsis, Paris, 1999. (ISBN 2-911606-41-8)
- Yiannis Saïtas et al., L'œuvre de l'expédition scientifique de Morée 1829-1838, Edited by Yiannis Saïtas, Editions Melissa, 2011 (Part I) - 2017 (Part II).
- Monique Dondin-Payre, La Commission d'exploration scientifique d'Algérie : une héritière méconnue de la Commission d'Égypte, Mémoires de l'académie des inscriptions et belles-lettres, tome XIV, 142 p., 11 fig., 1994.
- Ed. Bonnet, Deux lettres de Bory de Saint-Vincent relatives aux travaux de la Commission d'Algérie, Bull. Société de Botanique de France, 1909, 4e, t. IX (56: 1-9.)
- Hervé Ferrière, Bory de Saint-Vincent, militaire naturaliste entre Révolution et Restauration. PhD thesis submitted in 2001 to the doctoral school of Paris 1 University Sorbonne-Pantheon, director Pietro Corsi, 2006
- Hervé Ferrière, 2009. Bory de Saint-Vincent: L'évolution d'un voyageur naturaliste. Syllepse. ISBN 978-2849502433
- James A. Second, Visions of Science: Books and Readers at the Dawn of the Victorian Age. University Of Chicago Press. p. 60., 2015. ISBN 978-0226203287
- Aldo Fascolo, The Theory of Evolution and Its Impact. Springer. p. 27, 2011. ISBN 978-8847055865
- Ann Thomson, Issues at stake in eighteenth-century racial classification, Cromohs, 8 (2003): 1-20

=== General works ===
- Baynes, T. S., ed. (1878). "Jean Baptiste George Marie Bory de Saint-Vincent" . Encyclopædia Britannica. Vol. 4 (9th ed.). New York: Charles Scribner's Sons. p. 66.
- Chisholm, Hugh, ed. (1911). "Bory de Saint-Vincent, Jean Baptiste George Marie" . Encyclopædia Britannica. Vol. 4 (11th ed.). Cambridge University Press. p. 276.
- Lucie Allorgue, La fabuleuse odyssée des plantes, Chez Lattès, Paris, 2003.
- H. Baillon, Dictionnaire de botanique, Paris, Hachette, 1876, p. 456
- P. Biers, L'Herbier tricolore de Bory de Saint-Vincent, Bull Muséum Histoire naturelle, n° 5
- P. Biers, Bory de Saint-Vincent, chef directeur de l'Expédition scientifique de Morée, Bulletin Muséum Histoire Naturelle, n° 32, 1926, p. 254-259
- P. Biers, L'herbier cryptogamique de Bory de Saint-Vincent au Muséum, Bulletin Muséum Histoire Naturelle No. 30, 1924, p. 417-422
- P. Biers, Bory de Saint-Vincent à l'Île Bourbon, Revue de l'Agenais, 1927, t. 54, pp. 179–186 (Lire en ligne)
- Adrien Blanchet, Le Voyage en Grèce de J.B. Bory de Saint-Vincent, bull. de l'association Guillaume Budé, Paris, 1829, p. 26-46
- R. Bouvier, E. Maynial, Une aventure dans les mers australes, l'expédition du commandant Baudin, (1800-1803), Paris, 1947.
- Christophe Brun, 2013, Découper la Terre, inventorier l'Homme : le planisphère de Bory de Saint-Vincent, 1827, Monde(s). Histoire, Espaces, Relations, mai 2013, p. 67-89 et encart couleur, annexes sur le site de la revue (lire en ligne).
- Juan C. Castañón y Francisco Quirós, La contribución de Bory de Saint-Vincent (1778-1846) al conocimiento geográfico de la Península Ibérica. Redescubrimiento de una obra cartográfica y orográfica olvidada. Ería. Revista cuatrimestral de Geografía, n° 64-65, 2004, p. 177-205
- Pietro Corsi, Lamarck, genèse et enjeux du transformisme, 1770-1830, CNRS Éditions, Paris, 2001.
- B. Dayrat, Les botanistes et la flore de France – trois siècles de découverte, Paris, Publication du Muséum National d'Histoire Naturelle, 2003.
- Amédée Dechambre, Dictionnaire encyclopédique des sciences médicales, (première série), t. X, Ble-Bro, publié sous la direction de M. A. Dechambre, 1869.
- Léon Dufour, Souvenirs d'un savant français à travers un siècle, (1780-1865.) Science et histoire, Paris, J. Rothschild, 1888, p. 43-45
- Paul Guérin (dir.), Dictionnaire des dictionnaires, Paris, Librairie des imprimeries réunies, Motteroz, 1880.
- Louis-Étienne Héricart de Thury, Notice sur le baron Bory de Saint-Vincent, Bruxelles, in-12. Note que Lacroix dit ne pas avoir retrouvée (Lacroix, p. 58.) Cette notice est parue en 1848 dans les Notices bio-bibliographiques de l'Académie des Sciences de Belgique, tome VIII, p. 832
- Alfred Lacroix, Le naturaliste Bory de Saint-Vincent, Revue scientifique, 55^{e} année n° 8, avril, 1917, Éloge du savant prononcé en octobre 1916 à l'Académie des Sciences.
- Goulven Laurent, Paléontologie et évolution en France : 1800-1860. De Cuvier-Lamarck à Darwin, Paris, CTHS, 1987, p. 377-380.
- P. Maryllis, Bory de Saint-Vincent, naturaliste et voyageur, 6 p., La Couronne agenaise, Villeneuve-sur-Lot, 1910
- François Picavet, Les Idéologues, essai sur l'histoire des idées et des théories scientifiques, philosophiques, religieuses, etc. en France depuis 1789, édité en 1891.
- André Role, Un destin hors série : la vie aventureuse d'un savant : Bory de Saint-Vincent 1778-1846, 256 p. 16 pls. La Pensée universelle, Paris, 1973.
- Thomas Rouillard, un herbier de Bory saint-Vincent à Angers Bulletin de la Société d'Études Scientifiques de l'Anjou, t.XVIII, 2004
- C. Sauvageau, Bory de Saint-Vincent, d'après sa correspondance publiée par M. Lauzun, Journal de Botanique, 1908, 2^{e} série, 1 : 198-222.
- P. Tcherkezoff, Tahiti 1768, Jeunes filles en pleurs. Au vent des îles Éditions, Tahiti, Pirae, 2004.
- Jean Tucoo-Chala, Le Voyage en Grèce d'un naturaliste gascon en 1829, Bull. de l'association Guillaume Budé, en deux parties : dans le bulletin 2 et 3 de l'année, bull.2, p. 190-200 et Bull.3 p. 300-320, Paris, 1976.
- Pierre Vidal-Naquet, L'Atlantide, petite histoire d'un mythe platonicien, Paris, Les Belles Lettres, 2005.
