= Jean-Pierre Sylvestre de Grateloup =

French physician and naturalist

Jean-Pierre Sylvestre de Grateloup (31 December 1782 – 25 August 1862) was a French medical doctor and naturalist.

He completed his medical studies at Montpellier and remained attached to the countryside of the southwest of France. In company with his childhood friend Jean-Marie Léon Dufour (1780–1865) and Dufour's friend Jean-Baptiste Bory de Saint-Vincent (1778–1846) he expressed his enthusiasm for botany specializing in the study of cryptogams, the ferns and other plants that reproduce through spores. Then the shells found in the region attracted his attention, in particular those from the Adour.

He practiced medicine in the military hospitals at Dax, where from his graduation from Montpellier in 1807 he worked in the company of Jean Thore (1762–1823). Under the Bourbon Restoration he experienced setbacks in his career. After his marriage in 1822 he moved to Bordeaux.

As a corresponding member of the Société linnéenne de Paris, the world's first "Linnaean society", he was made director of the natural history museum of Dax, which was founded on the collections of Jacques-François de Borda d'Oro (1718–1804). In addition to his own works he edited articles for the Annales générales de sciences physiques by Bory de Saint-Vincent, Auguste Drapiez (1778–1856) et Jean-Baptiste Van Mons (1765–1842).

His Catalogue des mollusques terrestres et fluviatiles: vivants et fossiles, de la France continentale e insulaire, 1855, catalogued all the molluscs found in France, living and fossilized.
