= Auguste Drapiez =

Belgian naturalist (1778–1856)

Pierre Auguste Joseph Drapiez (28 August 1778, Lille – 28 December 1856, Brussels) was a Belgian naturalist. The standard author abbreviation Drapiez is used to indicate this person as the author when citing a botanical name.

He founded with the French botanist Jean Baptiste Bory de Saint-Vincent (1778–1846) and the Belgian chemist Jean-Baptiste Van Mons (1765–1842) the Annales générales de Sciences physiques consacrées aux Sciences naturelles published in six volumes between 1819 and 1822. His Dictionnaire portatif de chimie, de minéralogie et de géologie, en rapport avec l'état présent de ces sciences, composé par une société de chimistes, de minéralogistes et de géologues was published in 1824 and Résumé d'ornithologie ou d'histoire naturelle des oiseaux in 1829.

He published in 1833 with Pierre Corneille van Geel (1796–1838), Encyclographie du règne végétal. He was also the author of Guide pratique de minéralogie usuelle and Dictionnaire classique des sciences naturelles.

He left his library of 4,000 volumes to the town of Mons.

Drapiez is commemorated in the scientific name of a species of snake, Boiga drapiezii.

He was a founding member of the first Société des douze.
