= Jean-Baptiste Van Mons =

Belgian chemist (1765–1842)

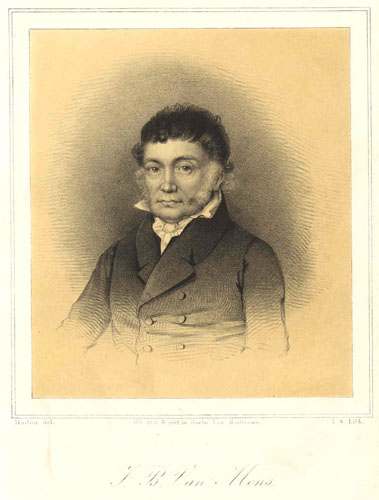
- Portrait by Jean Baptiste Madou
- Born: Jean-Baptiste Van Mons; 11 November 1765; Brussels, Belgium
- Died: 6 September 1842 (aged 76); Leuven, Belgium

Jean-Baptiste Van Mons (11 November 1765 Brussels — 6 September 1842 Leuven) was a Belgian physicist, chemist, botanist, horticulturist and pomologist, and professor of chemistry and agronomy at the State University of Leuven (1817-1830). Van Mons carried out the first recorded selective breeding of the European Pear through cycles of seed propagation.

== Career ==
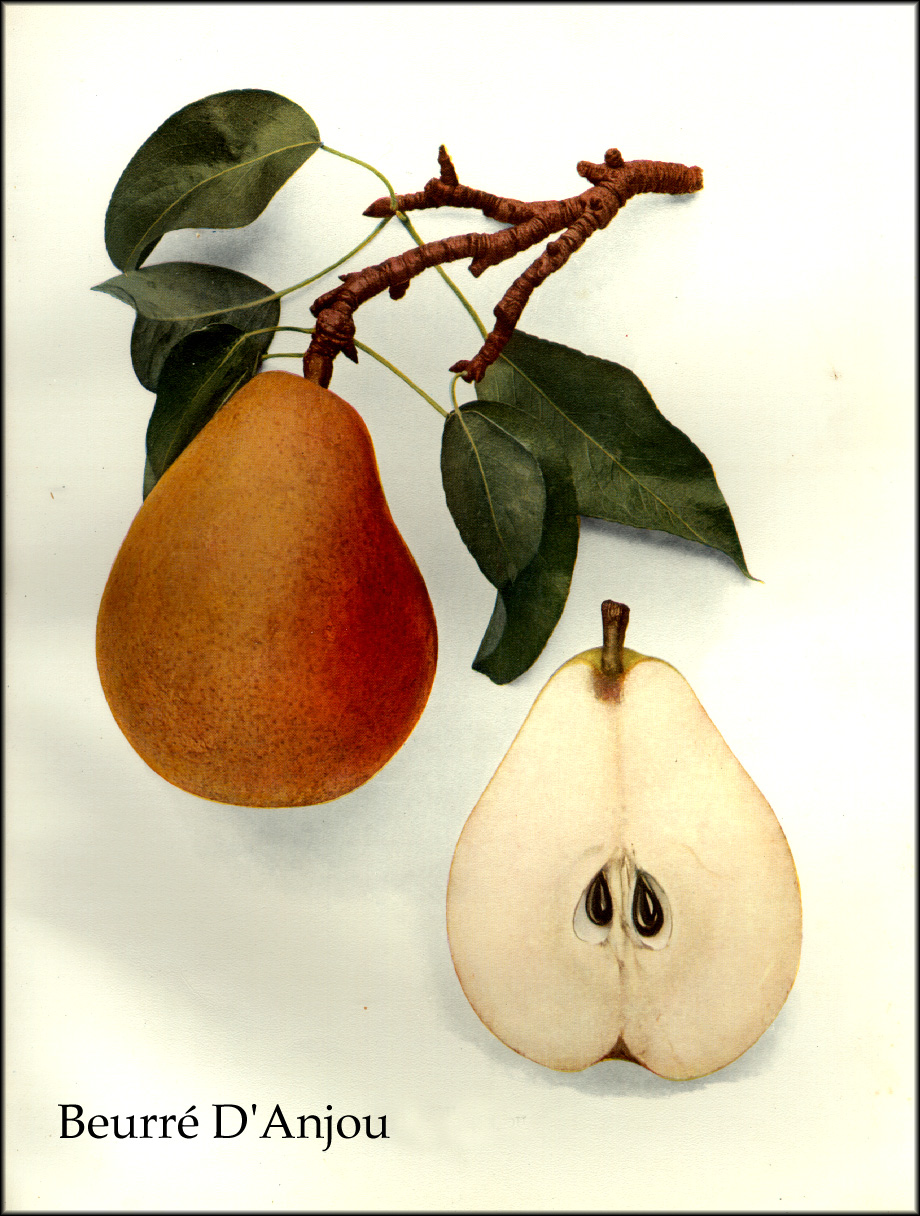
Van Mons' pear cultivar Beurre d'Anjou

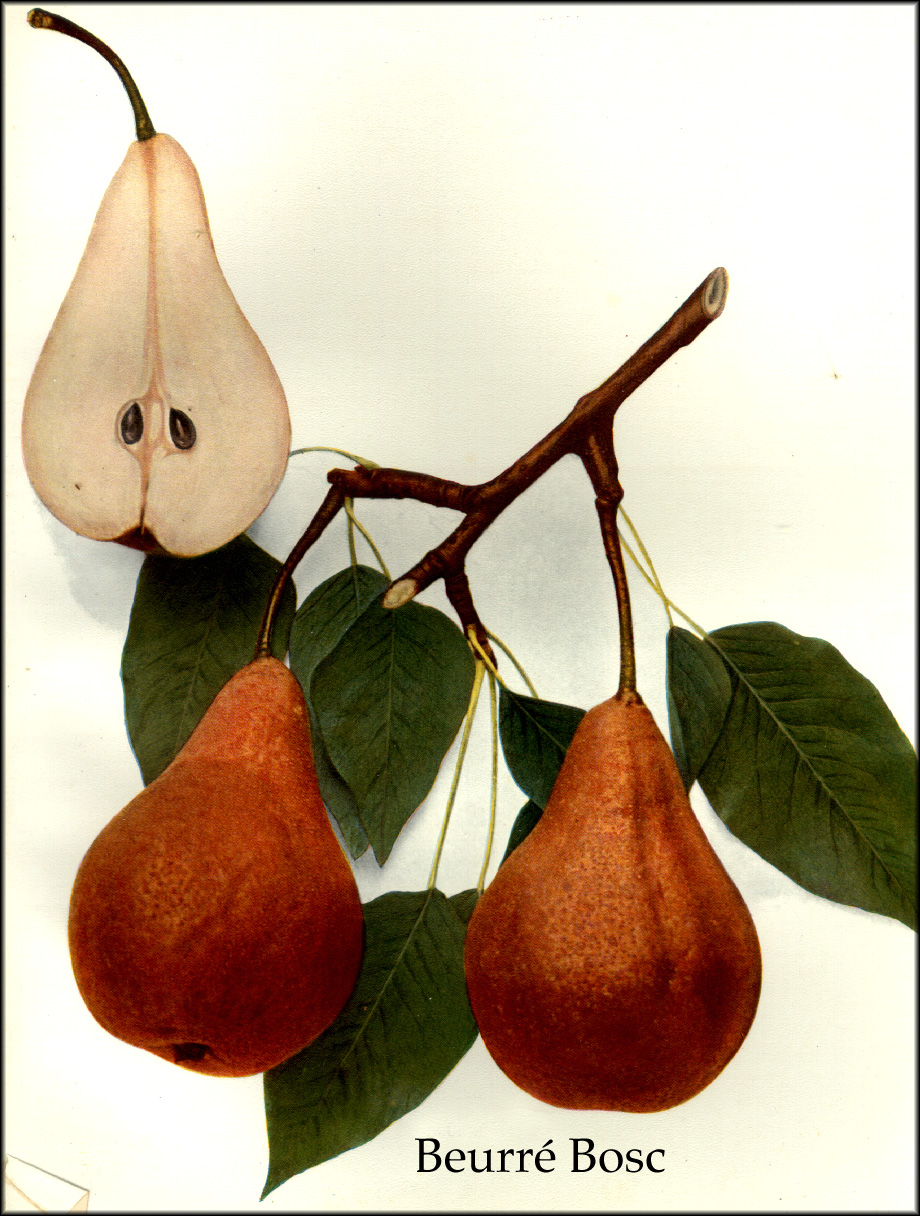
Van Mon's pear cultivar Beurre Bosc

“I have found this art to consist in regenerating in a direct line of descent, and as rapidly as possible an improving variety, taking care that there be no interval between the generations. To sow, to re-sow, to sow again, to sow perpetually, in short to do nothing but sow, is the practice to be pursued, and which cannot be departed from; and in short this is the whole secret of the art I have employed.”

— Jean-Baptiste Van Mons' Arbres Fruitiers

Van Mons was the most prolific pear breeder known, producing no fewer than 40 superior varieties over a 60-year period, including Bosc and D'Anjou pears. He readily shared his observations and plants, and developed effective ways of exporting cuttings and seedlings as far away as the United States. After his death his seed collection was acquired by Alexandre Bivort.

The French and Belgians were fanatical about pears, and spent an inordinate amount of time developing new varieties of pear with a buttery taste in the 18th century. A few Belgian varieties show this by having Beurré in the name. Louis XIV doted on pears, his greatest fruit love after figs and, not surprisingly, many varieties were cultivated at Versailles by his gardener Jean-Baptiste de la Quintinie.

He was a founding member of the second Société des douze.

== Selected works ==
- 1800 Pharmacopée Manuelle, (Bruxelles), 8vo.
- 1812 Grundsätze der Electricitätslehre zur Bestätigung der Franklin'schen Theorie - Marburg, Krieger
- 1812 French translation of Humphry Davy's Elements of Chemical Philosophy, London: Johnson and Co., 1812
- 1819-21 Annales Generales des Sciences Physiques (6 vols) - Jean Baptiste Bory de Saint-Vincent, Pierre Auguste Joseph Drapiez, Jean Baptiste Van Mons
- 1835-36 Abres fruitiers - L. Dusart, H. Vandenbroeck, Jean Baptiste Van Mons
