= Eugène Defacqz =

Belgian politician (1797–1871)

Eugene Defacqz
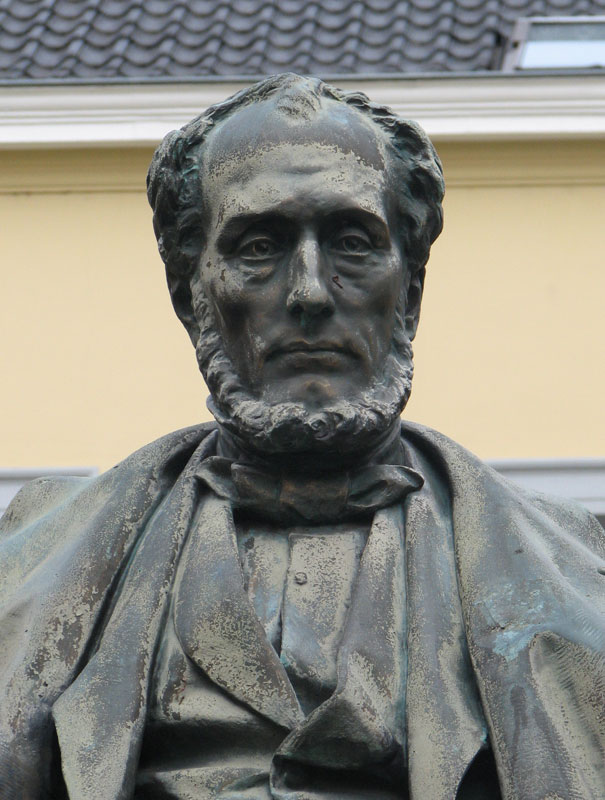
- Statue in Ath
- Born: Henri-Eugene-Marie Defacqz; 17 September 1797; Ath, Belgium
- Died: 1 December 1871 (aged 74); Ixelles, Belgium
- Occupation: politician

Henri-Eugene-Marie Defacqz (17 September 1797 – 1 December 1871) was a Belgian liberal politician and a magistrate.

== Education ==
He started his education at the college of Ath and completed high school in Dijon, under the direction of the famous Joseph Jacotot (1770–1840), his uncle by marriage. On 22 April 1817, he obtained his diploma of bachelor of law at the Academy of Brussels.

== Career ==
In 1830, Defacqz embraced without reserves the cause of the Belgian Revolution. He was sent to the National Congress by the voters of the district of Ath, together with Vansnick and Secus. He played an important role in this memorable assembly due to his great knowledge of the law, his elegant elocution and his irresistible logic. He was, in 1831, one of the authors of the Belgian Constitution. When Surlet de Chokier was elected regent of the kingdom, Defacqz was named secretary-general with the ministry of Justice. But soon he gave up these functions to enter the judiciary. In 1832, he became counselor for the Court of Appeal; in October of the same year, he became a prosecuting attorney at the Court of Cassation. From 1834 to 1839, he was a professor of common law at the Université libre de Bruxelles of which he was one of the founders together with Pierre-Théodore Verhaegen. He taught there the theory of the sources of the legislation. In 1837, he became counselor at the Court of Cassation, and in 1866, he became its first president and remained in this position until his death.

In addition to these legal functions, he occupied functions within the garde civique (E:civic guard), the communal council of Brussels and with the provincial council. In 1846, he took part in the creation of the Liberal Party of Belgium, which was the first political party as such in Belgium. From 1866 to 1871, he was elected member of the Royal Academy of Belgium, and he was a director of the class of literature of the academy. He was also a member of the Company of the men of letters of Leyde and the Company of sciences, arts and the letters of Hainaut. He was also a freemason, and Grandmaster of the Grand Orient of Belgium (1842-1854). In 1850 he became honorary member of the Masonic Lodge Minerva zu den drei Palmen Leipzig.

At the political level, Eugene Defacqz defended mainly, on the one hand the lowering of the taxable quota and an electoral reform in favor of the average and lower middle class and on the other hand the state education and separation on all levels of the State and the Church.

He published in particular:

- Ancien droit Belgique (1875),
- Des corvées et des banalités seigneuriales,
- Recherches sur les anciens impôts et spécialement sur les tailles réelles,
- De la paix du sang,
- De quelques partages forcés des fruits de la terre dans les anciennes coutumes belgiques,
- Aperçu de la féodalité.

In 1845, the Flemish musician and freemason Charles-Louis-Joseph Hanssens composed in 1845 a cantata for Eugene Defacqz. There exists in Brussels a street Eugene-Defacqz. The town of Ath honours him in several ways: a statue in the court of the administrative Center (it was before on the town square); a street bears its name; an extra (actor) impersonates him on the chariot of the city during the procession of the Ducasse of Ath.

Political offices
Preceded by Étienne Constantin de Gerlache	1st President of the Court of Cassation; 1867–1872	Succeeded by Guillaume de Crassier
Masonic offices
Preceded by Goswin de Stassart	Grand Master of the Grand Orient of Belgium; 1842–1854	Succeeded by Pierre-Théodore Verhaegen

== Sources ==
- Beknopte geschiedenis van de Liberale Partij (Dutch)
