= Jean-Joseph Raikem =

Belgian politician

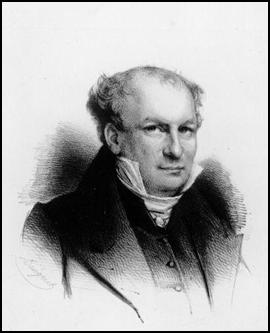

President of the Chamber of Representatives
- In office 9 November 1842 – 17 November 1843
- Preceded by: Isidore Fallon
- Succeeded by: Charles Liedts
- In office 15 November 1832 – 15 November 1839
- Preceded by: Etienne Constantin de Gerlache
- Succeeded by: Isidore Fallon

Personal details
- Born: 28 April 1787 Liège, Prince-Bishopric of Liège (now Belgium)
- Died: 24 January 1875 (aged 87)
- Party: Catholic Party
- Education: Free University of Brussels

Joseph-Jean Raikem or Jean-Joseph Raikem (Liege, 28 April 1787 – 24 January 1875) was a Roman Catholic Belgian politician, member of the National Congress of Belgium, president of the Chamber of Representatives, magistrate and historian.

== Works ==
- Discours prononcés à l'audience de rentrée de la Cour de 1833 à 1866 par le procureur général J. J. Raikem.
- Rapport sur l'organisation judiciaire, par J. J. Raikem, ministre de la Justice, Brussel, 1831.
- (with M.-L. Polain and others), Coutumes du pays de Liège, Luik, vol I, 1870; Vol. II, 1873; Vol. III 1884.
- Quelques événements du temps de Notger, Liège, 1870.

== Bibliography ==
- Léon COLLINET, Le Procureur général Raikem; notice biographique, Luik, 1875.
- Th. JUSTE, Notices biographiques: Jean-Joseph Raikem, etc., Brussel, 1876, p. 1–25.
- U. ERNST, Discours prononcé à la séance de rentrée de la Cour en 1875, Luik, 1875.
- Fr. DU BUS, Physionomie du Congrès national, Brussel, 1930.
- Ch. DU BUS DE WARNAFFE, Au temps de l'unionisme, Doornik, 1944.
- U. ERNST, Les officiers de justice au pays de Liège, Luik, 1875.
- J. GARSOU, Lettres de J.-J. Raikem (1830–1831), in: La Revue générale, 1938, p. 230–262.
- P. HANQUET, J.-J. Raikem, in: Les Gens de robe liégeois et la Révolution de 1830, Luik, 1931, p. 159–190.
- J. GARSOU, Lettres inédites de J.-J. Raikem à sa femme, février-mars 1839, in: La Vie Wallonne, 1938, p. 293–304.
- E. HUYTTENS, Discussions du Congrès national de Belgique 1830–1831, vol. I – IV, Brussel, 1844.
- R. WARLOMONT, Raikem (1787–1875), in: Journal des Tribunaux, 1964, p. 176.
- Armand FRESON, Jean-Joseph Raikem, in: Biographie nationale de Belgique, vol. XVIII, 1905, col. 599–601
- R. WARLOMONT, Jean-Joseph Raikem, in: Biographie nationale de Belgique, vol. XXXIII, 1965, col. 617–622)

Political offices
Preceded by Antoine Barthélemy	Minister of Justice; 1831–1832	Succeeded by Joseph Lebeau
Preceded by Etienne Constantin de Gerlache	President of the Chamber of Representatives; 1832–1839	Succeeded by Isidore Fallon
Preceded by Jean-Baptiste Nothomb	Minister of Justice; 1839–1840	Succeeded by Mathieu Leclercq
Preceded by Isidore Fallon	President of the Chamber of Representatives; 1842–1843	Succeeded by Charles Liedts
