= List of Belgian judges =

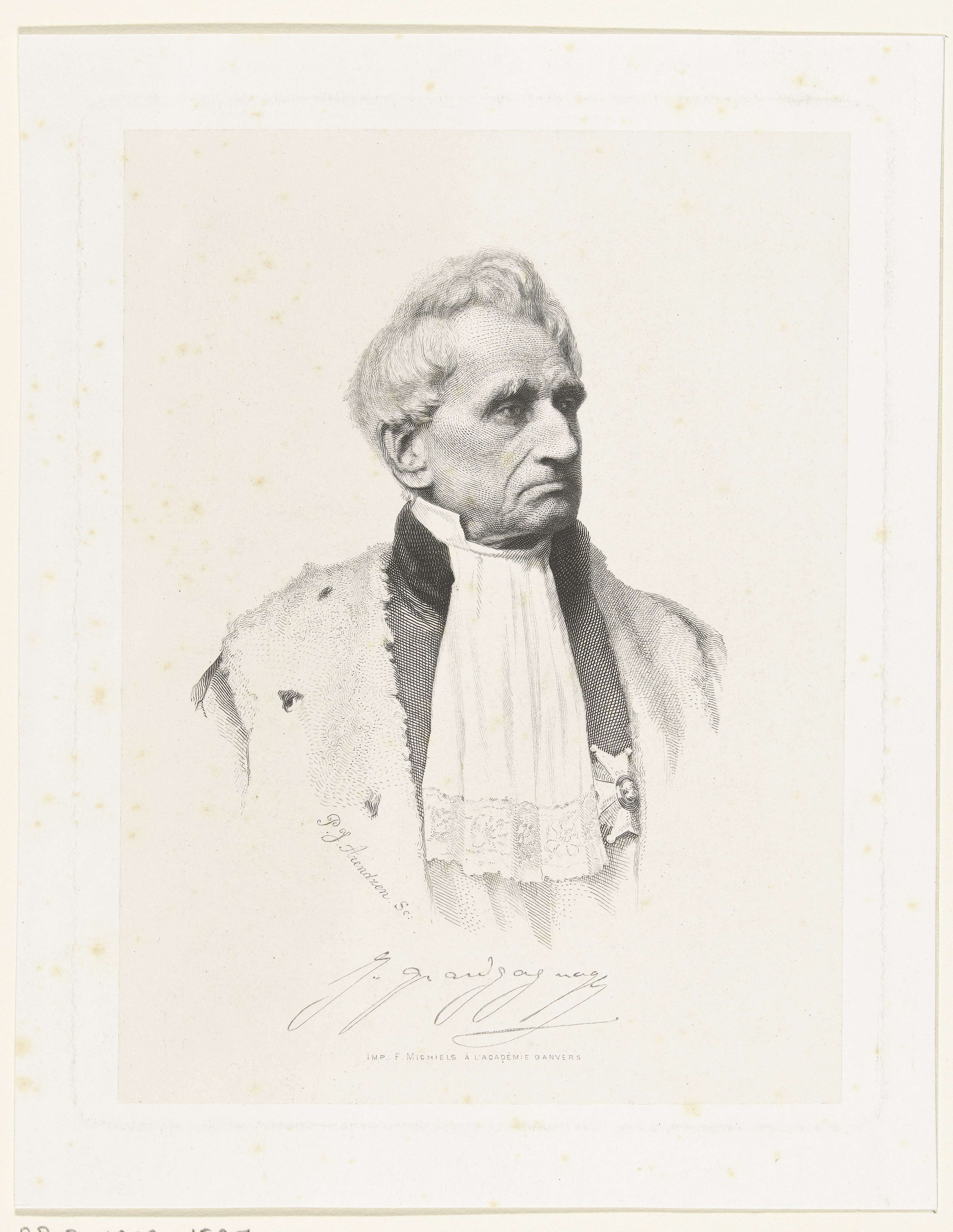
Joseph Grandgagnage, 1st President of the Court of appeal of Liège

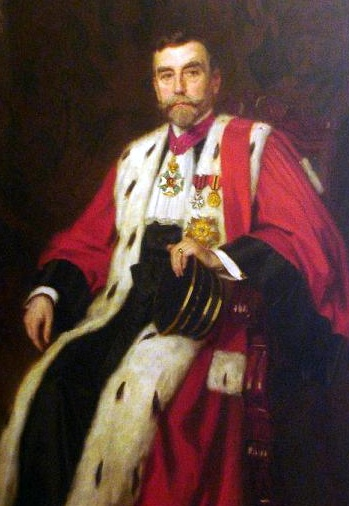
Baron Adrien de la Kethulle de Ryhove, 1st President of the Court of Appeal of Ghent between 1919-1923

This is a List of Belgian high Judges and National magistrates.

== 1st President of the Court of Cassation ==
- 1832-1867: Etienne de Gerlache
- 1832-1867: Eugène Defacqz
- 1872-1879: Guillaume de Crassier
- 1879-1890: Guillaume de Longe
- 1890-1893: Frédéric Bayet
- 1893-1899: Charles Beckers
- 1899-1901: Frédéric de le Court
- 1901-1903: Auguste Van Berchem
- 1903-1908: Jean Giron
- 1908-1911: Auguste Van Maldeghem
- 1911-1912: Jules Lameere
- 1912-1913: Pierre Scheyven
- 1913-1919: Eugène Du Pont
- 1919-1926: Paul Van Iseghem
- 1926-1939: Arthur Goddyn
- 1939-1946: Jean-François Joseph Jamar
- 1946-1951: Léopold Soenens
- 1951-1955: Nestor Louveaux
- 1955-1960: Paul Wouters
- 1960: Antoine de Clippele
- 1960-1961: Antoine Sohier
- 1961-1964: Paul Giroul
- 1964-1971: Jules Bayot
- 1971-1974: Arthur Belpaire
- 1974-1975: Karel Louveaux
- 1975-1977: Joseph Rutsaert
- 1977-1982: Alfred Wauters
- 1982-1983: Robert Legros
- 1983-1990: Marc Châtel
- 1990-1992: Robert Soetaert
- 1992-1998: Oscar Stranard
- 1998-2003: Pierre Marchal
- 2003-2007: Marc Lahousse
- 2007-2011: Ghislain Londers
- 2012-2014: Etienne Goethals
- 2014-2019: Jean de Codt.
- 2019-current: Beatrijs Deconinck

== Presidents of the Constitutional Court ==
- 1992-1993: Dieudonné André
- 2007-2014: Marc Bossuyt
- -2013:Roger Henneuse
- 2013-2018: Jean Spreutels.

== 1st President of the Council of State ==
- -2014: Robert Andersen
- 2014-2017: Yves Kreins
- 2017-:Roger Stevens

== 1st Presidents of the Court of Appeal of Brussels ==
- 1877-1881: Esq. Emmanuel de Prelle de la Nieppe
- 1889-1894: Emile Eeckman
- 1919: Henry Lévi-Morelle
- 1920-1922: Ferdinand Ernst
- 1923-1927: Léon Eeckman (son of Emile Eeckman)
- 1927-1933: Baron Édouard Joly
- 1933-1934: Henri Simons
- 1934-1938: Baron Georges de le Court
- 1938-1940: Count Oscar de Lichtervelde
- 1940-1945: vacancy
- 1945-1945: Léopold de Vos
- 1946-1950: Georges Chevalier
- 1950-1954: Rodolphe Heyse
- 1954-1959: Paul Marcoux
- 1959-1959: Paul Derminne
- 1959-1964: Jules Serny
- 1964-1965: Louis Mineur
- 1965-1967: Charles Winckelmans
- 1967-1973: Albert Saliez
- 1973-1977: Achilles Marechal
- 1977-1978: Marcel Liard
- 1978-1982: Jacques van der Haeghen
- 1982-1988: Marc de Smedt
- 1988-1990: Luciaan Slachmuylder
- 1990-1990: Jaak Verdood
- 1991-1992: José Anne de Molina
- 1992-1996: Pierre van de Walle
- 1997-2002: Jacqueline Closset
- 2002-2007: Marc de le Court
- 2007-2009: Guy Delvoie
- 2010-2014: Antoon Boyen

== Public Prosecution ==
=== Prosecutor-General of the court of Cassation ===
- 1996-1999: Eliane Liekendael
- 2014-2017: Patrick Duinslaeger.
- 2017-current: Dirk Thijs.

=== Presidents of the College of Prosecutors-General ===
- 2015-2016: Johan Delmulle, (Brussels)
- 2016-2017: Ignacio de la Serna, (Mons)
- 2017-2018: Patrick Vandenbruane, (Antwerp)

=== Presidents of the Council of Senior Crown Prosecutors ===
- 2017: Anne-Marie Gepts
