= Charles Liedts =

Belgian politician

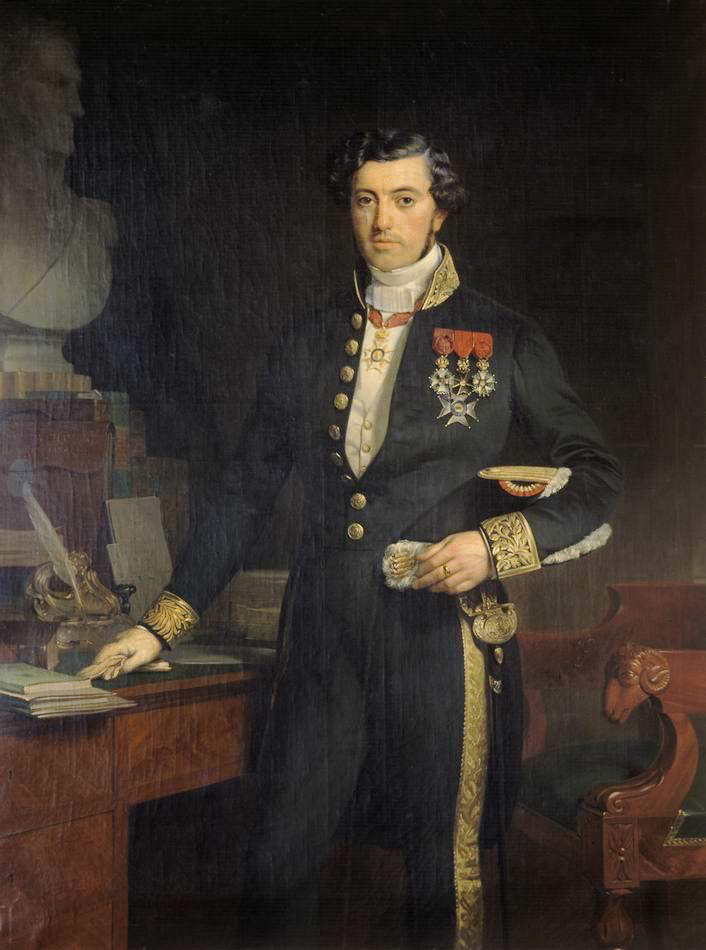

President of the Chamber of Representatives
- In office 17 November 1843 – 28 June 1848
- Preceded by: Jean-Joseph Raikem
- Succeeded by: Pierre-Théodore Verhaegen

Personal details
- Born: 2 December 1802 Oudenaarde, France (now Belgium)
- Died: 21 March 1878 (aged 75) Brussels, Belgium
- Party: Liberal Party
- Education: Ghent University

Charles Augustin Baron Liedts (2 December 1802 in Oudenaarde – 21 March 1878) was a Belgian liberal politician.

Born into the Bourgeoisie of Oudenaarde he became only 28 years young member of the National Congress of Belgium. After he became governor of Antwerp.

He was President of the Belgian Chamber of Representatives from 17 November 1843 until 20 May 1848. By royal Command he was created Baron Liedts by King Leopold II. He was Minister of Finance from 1852 to 1855.

He was married to Lady Rose de Haen 1815–1876.

== Honours ==
- 1847: Minister of state, by Royal Decree.
- 1870: Created Baron Liedts, by Royal Decree.
- Grand Cordon of the Order of Leopold.
- 1ste Class in the Order of the Red Eagle.
- Knight Grand Cross in the Order of the Netherlands Lion.
- Knight Grand Cross in the Order of the Iron Crown.
- Grand Officer in the Legion of Honour.
- Grand Officer in the Saxe-Ernestine House Order.

== See also ==
- Liberal Party
- Liberalism in Belgium

== Sources ==
Media related to Charles Liedts at Wikimedia Commons

- Charles Liedts (Dutch)

Political offices
| Preceded by Jean-Joseph Raikem | President of the Chamber of Representatives; 1843–1848 | Succeeded by Pierre-Théodore Verhaegen |
