= Josse Joseph de Lehaye =

Belgian politician

President of the Chamber of Representatives
- In office 25 April 1855 – 17 December 1857
- Preceded by: Noël Delfosse
- Succeeded by: Pierre-Théodore Verhaegen

Personal details
- Born: 28 May 1800 Ghent, France (now Belgium)
- Died: 22 September 1888 (aged 88) Outrijve, Belgium
- Party: Liberal Party

Josse Judocus Joseph de Lehaye-Dael (28 May 1800 – 22 September 1888) was a Belgian magistrate and liberal politician.

As a politician, he was a member of the National Congress, burgomaster of Merendree, member of the municipal council and mayor of Ghent (1854–1857), member of the provincial council of the province of East Flanders and a member of parliament. He was President of the Belgian Chamber of Representatives from 25 April 1855 until 13 June 1857.

== See also ==
- Liberal Party
- Liberalism in Belgium

== Sources ==
- Josse Joseph de Lehaye
- Balthazar, H., in : Nationaal Biografisch Woordenboek, Brussel, Koninklijke Vlaamse Academiën van België, 1964–, II, 1966, kol. 165–168.
- Lebrocquy, G., Types et Profils parlementaires, Paris, Lachaud & Burdin, 1873, pp. 502–506.
- De Paepe, Jean-Luc, Raindorf-Gérard, Christiane (ed.), Le Parlement Belge 1831–1894. Données Biographiques, Brussel, Académie Royale de Belgique, 1996, p. 159.

Political offices
Preceded by Noël Delfosse	President of the Chamber of Representatives; 1855–1857	Succeeded by Pierre-Théodore Verhaegen
