= FJO =

FJO or fjo may refer to:

== FJO ==
- Famous Jazz Orchestra, American band led by Vaughn Wiester
- FJO, post-nominals for the Order of Franz Joseph
- FJO, code for Ungmennafélagið Fjölnir sports club or its constituent sports teams
- Forum of Jewish Organisations, organization interfacing with the Coordinating Committee of Jewish Organizations in Belgium
- FJO, Royal Air Force squadron code for No. 29 Elementary Flying Training School RAF unit

== fjo ==
- .fjo, file extension used by Fjölnir (programming language)
