= De Croo =

De Croo is a surname. Notable people with the surname include:

- Alexander De Croo (born 1975), Belgian politician and businessman
- Herman De Croo (born 1937), Belgian politician
