= Raymond Langendries =

Belgian politician

President of the Chamber of Representatives
- In office 28 June 1995 – 1 July 1999
- Preceded by: Jos Dupré
- Succeeded by: Herman De Croo

Personal details
- Born: 1 October 1943 (age 82) Tubize, Belgium
- Party: Humanist Democratic Centre

Raymond A. Langendries (born 1 October 1943 in Tubize) is a Belgian politician and Member of the European Parliament for the French Community of Belgium with the Centre Démocrate Humaniste, part of the European People's Party and sits on the European Parliament's Committee on Employment and Social Affairs.

He is a substitute for the Committee on Development, a member of the Delegation to the ACP-EU Joint Parliamentary Assembly and a substitute for the Delegation for relations with the People's Republic of China.

On 17 July 2008, he was one of three senior Belgian politicians commissioned by King Albert II to investigate ways of enabling constitutional reform talks in the light of the long-running Belgian constitutional crisis.

== Education ==
- 1964: Teaching diploma

== Career ==
- 1964-1972: Primary teacher
- 1981-1985: Head of the office of the Minister for the Interior
- 1972-1974: Secretary of the PSC in the House of Representatives
- 1974-1979: PSC national secretary
- since 1971: Member of Tubize Municipal Council
- 1976-1982: Deputy Mayor of Tubize
- since 1995: Mayor of Tubize
- 1991-2004: Member of Parliament (1979–1981
- 1979-1981 and 1991-1995: Chairman of the PSC Group in the House of Representatives
- 1995-1999: President of the House of Representatives
- 1999-2004: President of the cdH Group (PSC) in the House of Representatives
- 1985-1991: Senator
- 1985-1989: Chairman of the PSC Group in the Senate
- 1989-1992: Minister for the Civil Service
- Belgian Member of the Inter-Parliamentary Union

== Decorations ==
- Commander of the Order of Leopold (Belgium)
- Commander of the Order of the Crown
- 2002: Minister of State

== See also this ==
- 2004 European Parliament election in Belgium

Political offices
| Preceded by Jos Dupré | President of the Chamber of Representatives; 1995–1999 | Succeeded by Herman De Croo |
