= Jos Dupré =

Belgian politician (1928–2021)

Mayor of Westerlo
- In office 1989–1996
- Preceded by: Jozef Thys
- Succeeded by: Guy Van Hirtum
- In office 1977–1982
- Preceded by: Jozef Draulans
- Succeeded by: Jozef Thys

Minister of the Environment of Flanders
- In office 3 February 1988 – 18 October 1988
- Preceded by: Paul Akkermans
- Succeeded by: Theo Kelchtermans

State Secretary of Institutional Reforms
- In office 18 October 1988 – 7 March 1992

Secretary of State of Public Works
- In office 1989–1992
- Preceded by: Paula D'Hondt
- Succeeded by: position abolished

Member of the Chamber of Representatives of Belgium
- In office 1974–1996
- Constituency: Turnhout electoral district

President of the Chamber of Representatives of Belgium
- In office 8 June 1995 – 28 June 1995
- Preceded by: Charles-Ferdinand Nothomb
- Succeeded by: Raymond Langendries

Member of the Flemish Council
- In office 21 October 1980 – May 1995

Personal details
- Born: Jozef Dupré; 8 July 1928 Laakdal, Belgium
- Died: 2 December 2021 (aged 93)
- Party: CDV

Jozef "Jos" Dupré (8 July 1928 – 2 December 2021) was a Belgian politician. A member of the Christian Social Party, he served in the Chamber of Representatives from 1974 to 1996, while serving as President briefly in June 1995. He also sat on the Flemish Council from 1980 to 1995.
