= Ath (Chamber of Representatives constituency) =

Constituency in Belgium

Ath was a constituency used to elect a two members of the Belgian Chamber of Representatives between 1831 and 1900.

== Representatives ==
Election	Representative (Party)	Representative (Party)
1831	Alexandre Dugniolle de Mévius (Catholic)	Frédéric de Sécus (Catholic)
1833	Adolphe Dechamps (Catholic)	Frédéric de Sécus (Catholic)
1837	Adolphe Dechamps (Catholic)	Frédéric de Sécus (Catholic)
1841	Adolphe Dechamps (Catholic)	Frédéric de Sécus (Catholic)
1845	Alexis du Roy de Blicquy (Catholic)	Frédéric de Sécus (Catholic)
1848	Jean-Baptiste Delescluse (Liberal)	Martin Jouret (Liberal)
1852	Frédéric de Sécus (Catholic)	Martin Jouret (Liberal)
1856	Frédéric de Sécus (Catholic)	Martin Jouret (Liberal)
1857	Léopold Frison (Liberal)	Martin Jouret (Liberal)
1861	Léopold Frison (Liberal)	Martin Jouret (Liberal)
1864	Henri Bricoult (Liberal)	Joseph Jules Descamps (Liberal)
1868	Henri Bricoult (Liberal)	Joseph Jules Descamps (Liberal)
1870	Henri Bricoult (Liberal)	Joseph Jules Descamps (Liberal)
1874	Henri Bricoult (Liberal)	Joseph Jules Descamps (Liberal)
1878	Florimond Durieu (Liberal)	Joseph Jules Descamps (Liberal)
1882	Florimond Durieu (Liberal)	Oswald de Kerchove de Denterghem (Liberal)
1886	Florimond Durieu (Liberal)	Oswald de Kerchove de Denterghem (Liberal)
1890	Florimond Durieu (Liberal)	Oswald de Kerchove de Denterghem (Liberal)
1892	Edouard Jean de Rouillé (Catholic)	Oswald de Kerchove de Denterghem (Liberal)
1894	Edouard Jean de Rouillé (Catholic)	Léon Cambier (Catholic)
1898	Georges Heupgen (Liberal)	Oswald Ouverleaux (Liberal)
