= Joseph Jules Descamps =

President of the Chamber of Representatives
- In office 22 March 1881 – 23 July 1884
- Preceded by: Jules Guillery
- Succeeded by: Xavier Victor Thibaut

Personal details
- Born: 25 October 1820; Ath, United Kingdom of the Netherlands (now Belgium)
- Died: 12 March 1892 (aged 71); Monaco
- Political party: Liberal Party

Jules Joseph (Joseph) Descamps (25 October 1820 – 12 March 1892) was a Belgian Liberal politician. He was a member of the Belgian parliament for the constituency of Ath and served as President of the Belgian Chamber of Representatives from 22 March 1881 until 17 May 1884.

== Sources ==
- De Paepe, Jean-Luc, Raindorf-Gérard, Christiane (ed.), Le Parlement Belge 1831-1894. Données Biographiques, Brussels, Académie Royale de Belgique, 1996, p. 228.

Political offices
Preceded by Jules Guillery	President of the Chamber of Representatives; 1881–1884	Succeeded by Xavier Victor Thibaut
