= André Flahaut =

Belgian politician

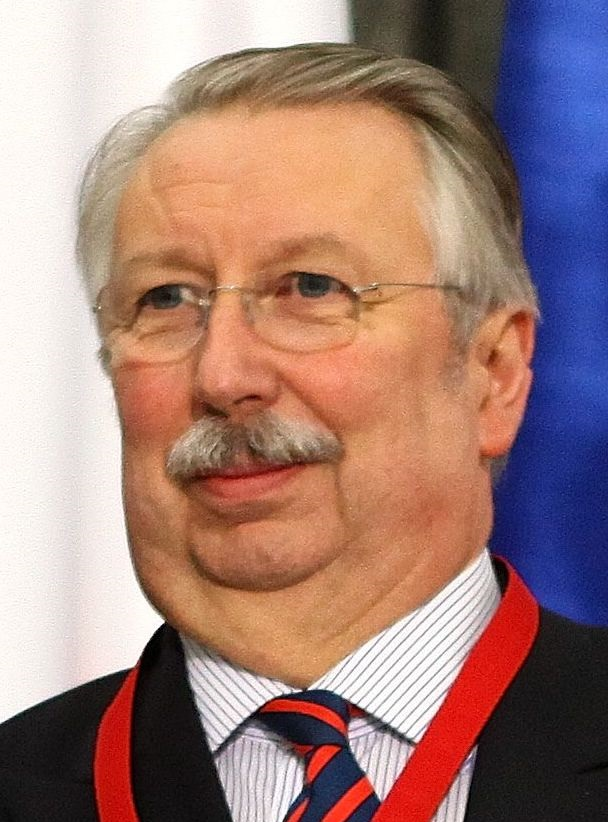
- Flahaut in 2012

President of the Chamber of Representatives
- In office 20 July 2010 – 30 June 2014
- Preceded by: Patrick Dewael
- Succeeded by: Patrick Dewael

Minister of Defence
- In office 12 July 1999 – 21 December 2007
- Prime Minister: Guy Verhofstadt
- Preceded by: Jean-Pol Poncelet
- Succeeded by: Pieter De Crem

Minister of the Civil Service
- In office 23 June 1995 – 12 July 1999
- Prime Minister: Jean-Luc Dehaene
- Preceded by: Louis Tobback
- Succeeded by: Luc Van den Bossche

Personal details
- Born: 18 August 1955 (age 71) Walhain, Belgium
- Party: Socialist Party
- Education: Université libre de Bruxelles

André M. J. Gh. Flahaut (born 18 August 1955) is a Belgian politician, then in the province of Brabant and now in the province of Walloon Brabant. Flahaut studied political sciences and public administration at the Université libre de Bruxelles.

== Political career ==
Flahaut was born in Walhain. He joined the Socialist Party in 1973. From 1989 to 1995 he served in various posts in the administration of Walloon Brabant. He has served in the local council of Walhain, in the provincial council of Walloon Brabant and as deputy governor of Walloon Brabant. Since 12 July 1999 he has served as Minister of Defence in both governments of Guy Verhofstadt, Verhofstadt I (1999–2003) and Verhofstadt II (2003–2007).

In 2009, he demanded the recall of the Belgian ambassador to the Holy See after controversy over comments by Pope Benedict XVI, who claimed that condoms promoted AIDS. Flahaut commented: "The comments made by the pope, who is a head of state, are sufficiently grave, inappropriate, and inadmissible that we should mark, in a symbolic but very strong fashion, our displeasure and disapproval."

From 20 July 2010 through 30 June 2014, he was President of the Belgian Chamber of Representatives. Flahaut is the current Minister of Budget in the Government of the French Community.

== Antisemitic charges and subsequent lawsuit ==
Because of charges of antisemitism brought by the Coordinating Committee of Jewish Organizations in Belgium (CCOJB) and Joël Rubinfeld, André Flahaut decided to lodge a complaint of defamation in June 2008, demanding €25,000 in damages and official apology. The tribunal of first instance of Brussels in a verdict returned in October 2009 agreed with Flahaut on an apology, but not on the damages. The CCOJB and Joël Rubinfeld appealed the decision and won.

New Comité de coordination des organisations juives de Belgique (CCOJB) leader Professor Maurice Sosnowski commented on the lawsuit: "Rubinfeld was right to accuse Flahaut and right to appeal the first circuit's sentence, but a reasonable compromise is better than a long and uncertain procedure."

== Honours ==
- 2014: Knight Grand Cross in the Order of Leopold II.

Political offices
Preceded by Louis Tobback	Minister of the Civil Service; 1995–1999	Succeeded by Luc Van den Bossche
Preceded by Jean-Pol Poncelet	Minister of Defence; 1999–2007	Succeeded by Pieter De Crem
Preceded by Patrick Dewael	President of the Chamber of Representatives; 2010–2014	Succeeded by Patrick Dewael
