= Lodewijk De Raet =

Flemish economist and politician (1870–1914)

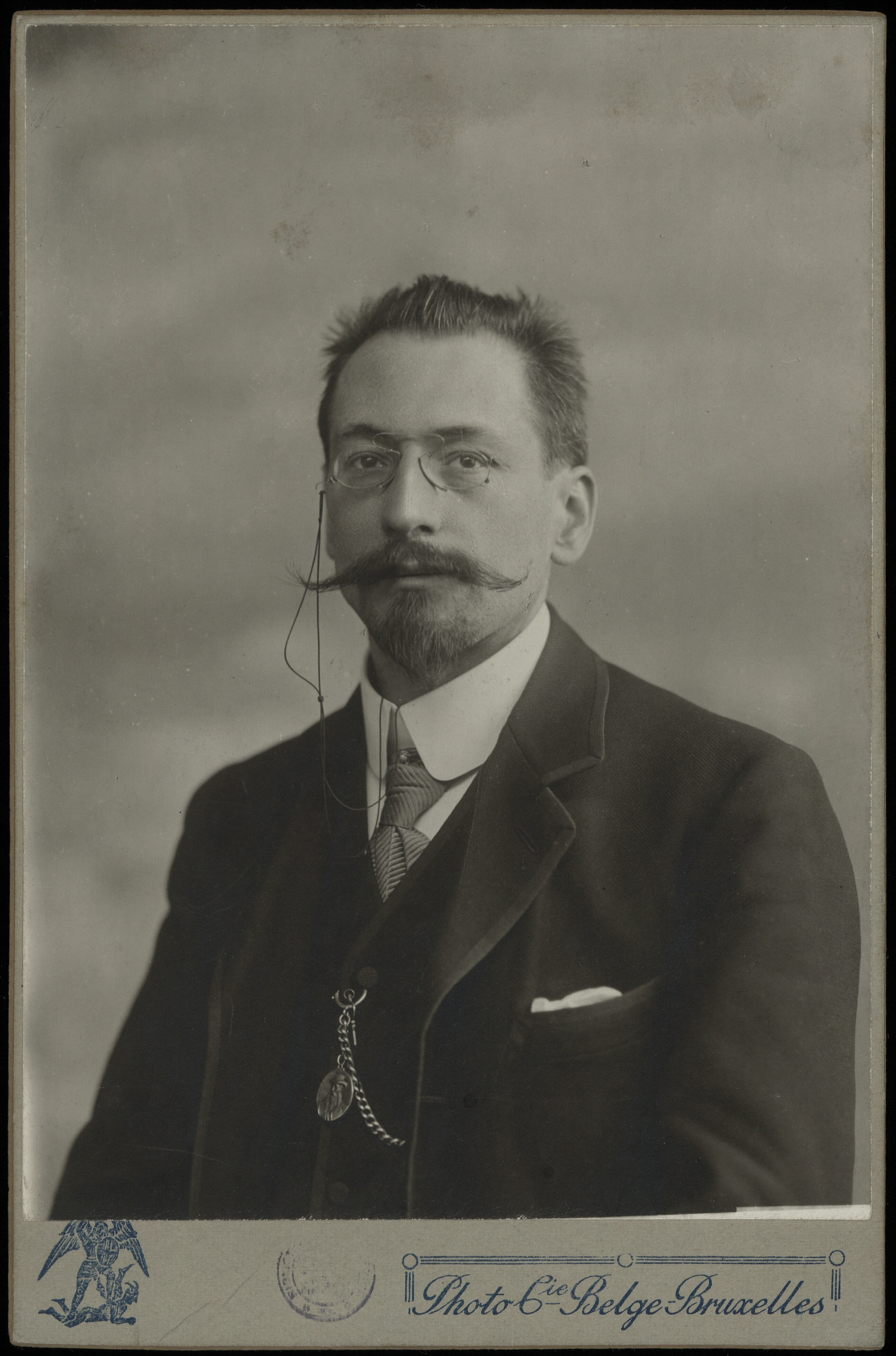
Lodewijk De Raet

Lodewijk De Raet (Dutch pronunciation: [ˈloːdəʋɛiɡ də ˈraːt]; (Note: Lodewijk in isolation is [ˈloːdəʋɛik].) Brussels, 17 February 1870 – Forest, 24 November 1914) was a Flemish economist and politician. He played an important role in the Flemish movement. He was co-founder of the Vlaamsche volkspartij (1892), and was a proponent of the use of Dutch instead of French at the University of Ghent in Flanders (north part of Belgium). He believed that the economic development of Flanders was necessary for the political and cultural strengthening of the region. His motto was: taalbelang is stoffelijk belang (English: [the] linguistic concern is [a] material concern).

Already as a teenager in highschool Lodewijk De Raet showed a commitment for the Flemish cause. Together with August Vermeylen he started the illustrated magazine Jong Vlaanderen (E: Young Flanders) and he had been involved in the establishment of De Vlaamsche Wacht (E: Flemish guard), an organization of Flemings in Brussels. In this organization Lodewijk De Raet developed his economic program for the development of Flanders. In the meantime he studied, thanks to the support of Emiel Blauwaert, a friend of its deceased father, at the École polytechnique of the Universite Libre de Bruxelles (ULB). Here he became a member of the student group Geen Taal Geen Vrijheid (E: no language, no freedom), and he was a member of the Femish liberal (agnostic) student organization.

As a student Lodewijk De Raet became convinced that economy and education had a strong link. In order to be able to compete economically with other regions and to acquire a sufficiently strong position to be able preserve their economic independence, the Flemish people must have intellectual tools, such as a Flemish university. Together with its friends of Geen Taal Geen Vrijheid he created a Flemish University Extension. In 1899, he graduated in economic sciences at the Universite Libre de Bruxelles.

In the same period he had been involved in the establishment of the Flemish society Eendracht is Macht and the Flemish publication Schild en Vriend (E: shield and friend). Beside all this he became an employee of the ' Institut of sociology' of Ernest Solvay. In 1903, he started a campaign to introduce Flemish at the University of Ghent, which was accepted in 1906.

On 31 March 1911, the bill for the use of Flemish at the University of Ghent, was submitted to the Belgian parliament by Frans Van Cauwelaert, Louis Franck and Camille Huysmans. In 1912 Lodewijk De Raet obtained a PhD in economic sciences at the Solvay Sociology Institute. Lodewijk De Raet died some months later and he would not witness the introduction of Flemish at the University of Ghent in 1930.

In 1952, the Foundation Lodewijk De Raet was founded, which is a foundation for education of adults.

== See also ==
- Lieven Gevaert

== Sources ==
- Lodewijk De Raet (Dutch)
- Max Lamberty, Lodewijk De Raet. Een levensbeeld', publ. Heideland, 1961
