= Auguste Orts =

Belgian politician (1814–1880)

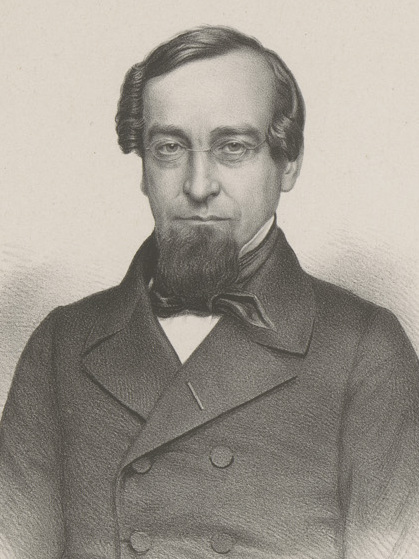

President of the Chamber of Representatives
- In office 19 July 1859 – 23 November 1860
- Preceded by: Pierre-Théodore Verhaegen
- Succeeded by: Désiré Vervoort

Personal details
- Born: 7 April 1814 Brussels, France (now Belgium)
- Died: 3 November 1880 (aged 66) Brussels, Belgium
- Party: Liberal Party
- Relations: Orts family

Auguste Engelbert Pierre Orts (7 April 1814 – 3 November 1880), was a Belgian lawyer and liberal politician.

Auguste Orts was a Lawyer, magistrate, professor at the Université libre de Bruxelles and alderman of Brussels. He was President of the Belgian Chamber of Representatives from 19 July 1859 until 18 July 1860 and Minister of State.

== See also ==
- Liberal Party
- Liberalism in Belgium

== Sources ==
- Auguste Engelbert Pierre Orts
- Mesdach de ter Kiele, in : Biographie Nationale, Brussels, Académie Royale des Sciences, des Lettres et des Beaux Arts, 1866–1986, XVI, 1901, kol. 334–342.
- Vanderkindere, L., L'Université de Bruxelles 1834–1884, Brussel, 1884, p. 183-184.
- De Paepe, Jean-Luc, Raindorf-Gérard, Christiane (ed.), Le Parlement Belge 1831–1894. Données Biographiques, Brussels, Académie Royale de Belgique, 1996, p. 447-448.

Political offices
Preceded by Pierre-Théodore Verhaegen	President of the Chamber of Representatives; 1859–1860	Succeeded by Désiré Vervoort
