= Pierre-Théodore Verhaegen =

Belgian politician (1796–1862)

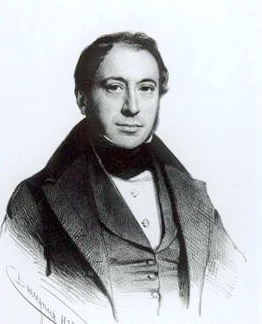

President of the Chamber of Representatives
- In office 17 December 1857 – 19 July 1859
- Preceded by: Josse Joseph de Lehaye
- Succeeded by: Auguste Orts
- In office 28 June 1848 – 3 April 1852
- Preceded by: Charles Liedts
- Succeeded by: Noël Delfosse

Personal details
- Born: 5 September 1796 Brussels, France (now Belgium)
- Died: 8 December 1862 (aged 66) Brussels, Belgium
- Party: Liberal Party

Pierre-Théodore Verhaegen (5 September 1796 – 8 December 1862) was a Belgian lawyer and liberal politician known as the founder of the Free University of Brussels (now split into the Université libre de Bruxelles and the Vrije Universiteit Brussel). He was twice chairman of the Belgian Chamber of Representatives (from 1848 to 1852 and from 1857 to 1859). A Freemason, he was also Grand Master of the Grand Orient of Belgium.

== Family history ==
He was born in Brussels, where he lived his whole life, and part of a Catholic family of lawyers from the region of Haacht. The Verhaegens had an academic background; two had been principals of the University of Leuven. Pierre-Théodore Verhaegen, his godfather, had been the last headmaster (rector) of the Old University of Louvain before it was closed by the French revolutionary troops. The family went on to become part of the Catholic elite of Belgium and was raised to the nobility, which Pierre-Théodore always refused. They married into families such as Carton de Wiart and Wouters d'Oplinter.

His best-known descendant is possibly his grandson Arthur Verhaegen, architect (especially of Catholic school buildings), Conservative-Catholic member of parliament, and founder of the antisocialist worker association and the Catholic daily Het Volk. Father Philippe Verhaegen was spiritual advisor to King Baudouin for 20 years. Another descendant is Marie-Pierre, Countess Bernard d'Udekem d'Acoz, cousin by marriage to Queen Mathilde.

== Life ==
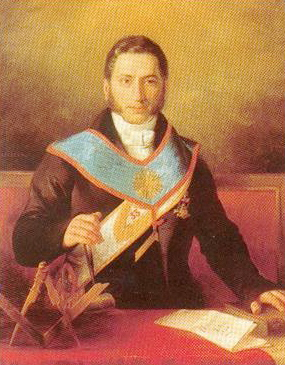
Verhaegen with masonic symbols

Pierre-Théodore Verhaegen grew up when Belgium was incorporated into France. The French Revolution's influence was immense, certainly in his birth city, Brussels, where his father had established himself as a lawyer. He attended school at the Lycée impérial and studied law at the Ecole de Droit, founded by Napoleon I of France in Brussels. When, in 1815, French predominance had been replaced by Dutch, through the union with the Netherlands under King William I of the Netherlands, he became a lawyer himself. His first large case involved three priests accused of disobedience to the regime of William I. His legal practice made him a wealthy man.

Undoubtedly, his decision to join freemasonry was an important step in his life. In 1823, he was inaugurated in the Brussels Lodge L'Espérance, presided over by the Prince of Orange. His relations with the prince led to an appointment as burgomaster of Watermael-Boitsfort, then still a very rural municipality in the Sonian Forest.

He became an Orangist, a partisan of the more or less enlightened regime of William I (which strongly promoted public education). He did not want to be involved with the Belgian revolution of 1830. As a burgomaster, he ensured that Bosvoorde remained calm. After the Belgian state was definitively founded, he understood that Orangism had no future, and he chose the side of the Belgian liberals. In 1833, he was Master of the Masonic lodge Les Amis Philanthropes in Brussels. He intended Belgian freemasonry, with its progressive ideas, to play a leading role in Belgian politics. However, this stance led to opposition within the Grand Orient and Masonic organizations abroad. Verhaegen was Grand Master of the Grand Orient of Belgium from 1854 to 1862.

From this moment on, Verhaegen started the development of a Liberal Party. The first liberal electoral association in Belgium, the Alliance of Brussels, grew out of his lodge Les Amis Philantropes. Verhaegen himself, from 1836 up to 1859, was a liberal member of parliament for Brussels. Twice (from 28 June 1848 to 28 September 1852 and from 17 December 1857 to June 1859), he was Chairman of the House of Parliament. Doctrinary and anticlerical, the liberals then formed the political left wing of Belgian politics. Verhaegen himself, in those days, had pronounced progressive ideas. He was a real doctrinary liberal. A convinced monarchist, he was opposed to revolutions and no proponent of general voting rights. He opposed a general learning duty because he feared that the Catholic schools would profit from it. This, however, does not mean that he was insensitive to the needs of the lower classes. He was opposed to taxes, especially those that affected people experiencing poverty. As a child of the Enlightenment, he was convinced that the progress of humanity would eventually lead to general prosperity. As a perfectly bilingual inhabitant of Brussels, Verhaegen, who had frequently pleaded under Dutch rule in Dutch, considered himself a Fleming. Although he preferred French and found it normal that this was the official language of Belgium, he thought that the Dutch language had to be treated equitably in education. He was not an atheist, but he was anticlerical in the word's strict meaning: someone opposed to the clergy's influence on society. This strong antagonist of the Catholic party called himself in public a Catholic, even a better Catholic than his clerical antagonists. He regularly attended mass, to the despair of his political enemies.

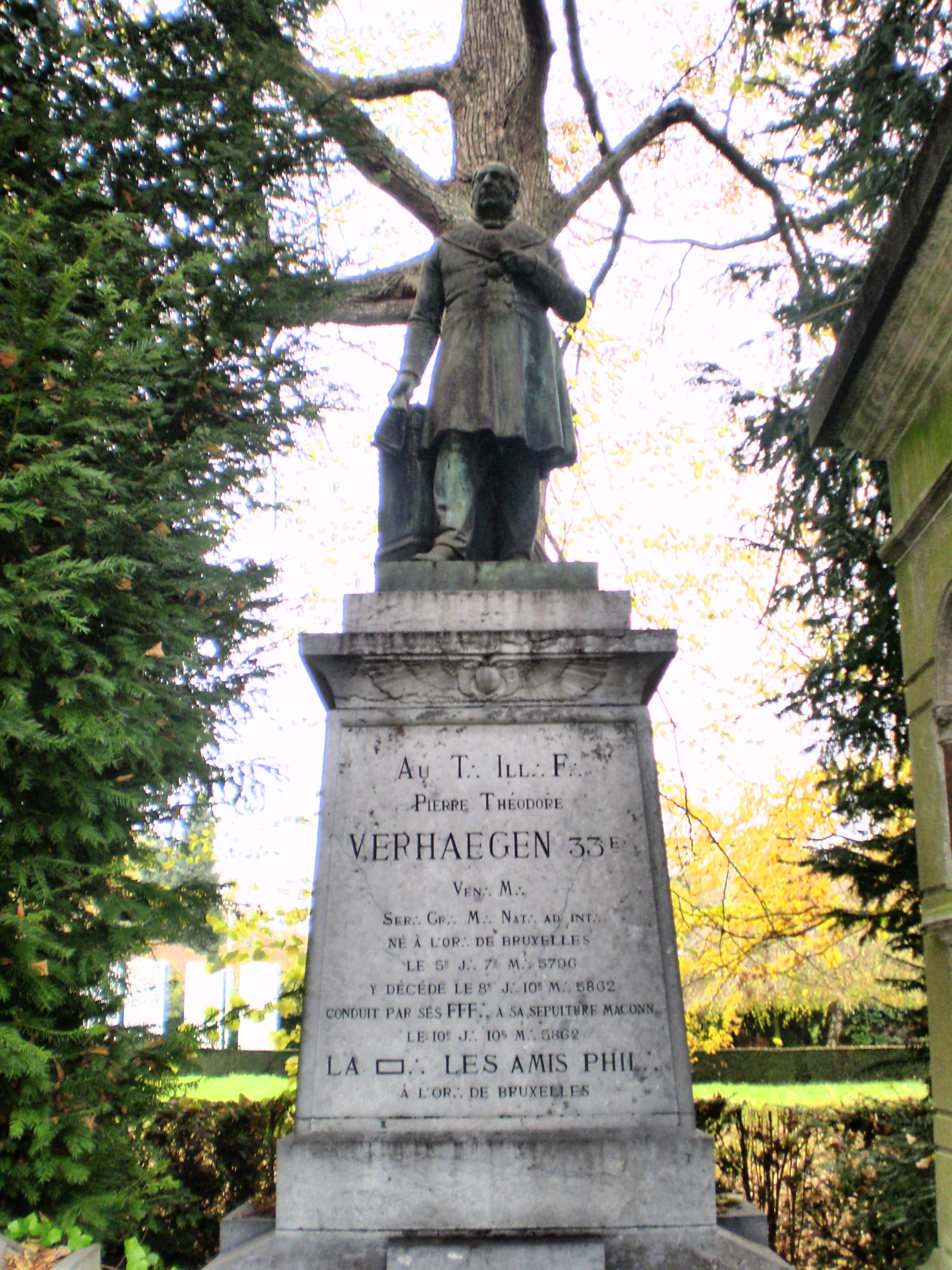
Verhaegen's tomb in Brussels Cemetery

He donated a critical amount of money to construct a church in Bosvoorde. He was convinced that religion was essential for people (most of the Belgian liberals and freemasons of that time were, to some degree, religious, even if they had to break with the Catholic Church). But the place of the priest was for him in the church, not in public life and politics. He vehemently denounced the influence of the church on the state and science, which, in his opinion, had an oppressing and reactionary influence on progress and even was, in his opinion, disadvantageous for true religion. It was a time in which Pope Pius IX condemned the Belgian constitutional freedoms, also the freedom of opinion expression, as misleadings (Quanta cura issued on 8 December 1864 – against modernism). Still, Verhaegen remained religious, attending Sunday mass and financing church constructions in Brussels.

Thousands of people attended his funeral service—politicians, professors, students, and alumni of the ULB. Twenty years after his death, the lodge Les Amis Philantropes erected a statue of Verhaegen in front of his grave. In 1865, his admirers erected a statue of him, which now stands by the main building of the ULB on the Avenue Franklin Roosevelt/Franklin Rooseveltlaan in Brussels.

== Foundation of the Free University of Brussels ==
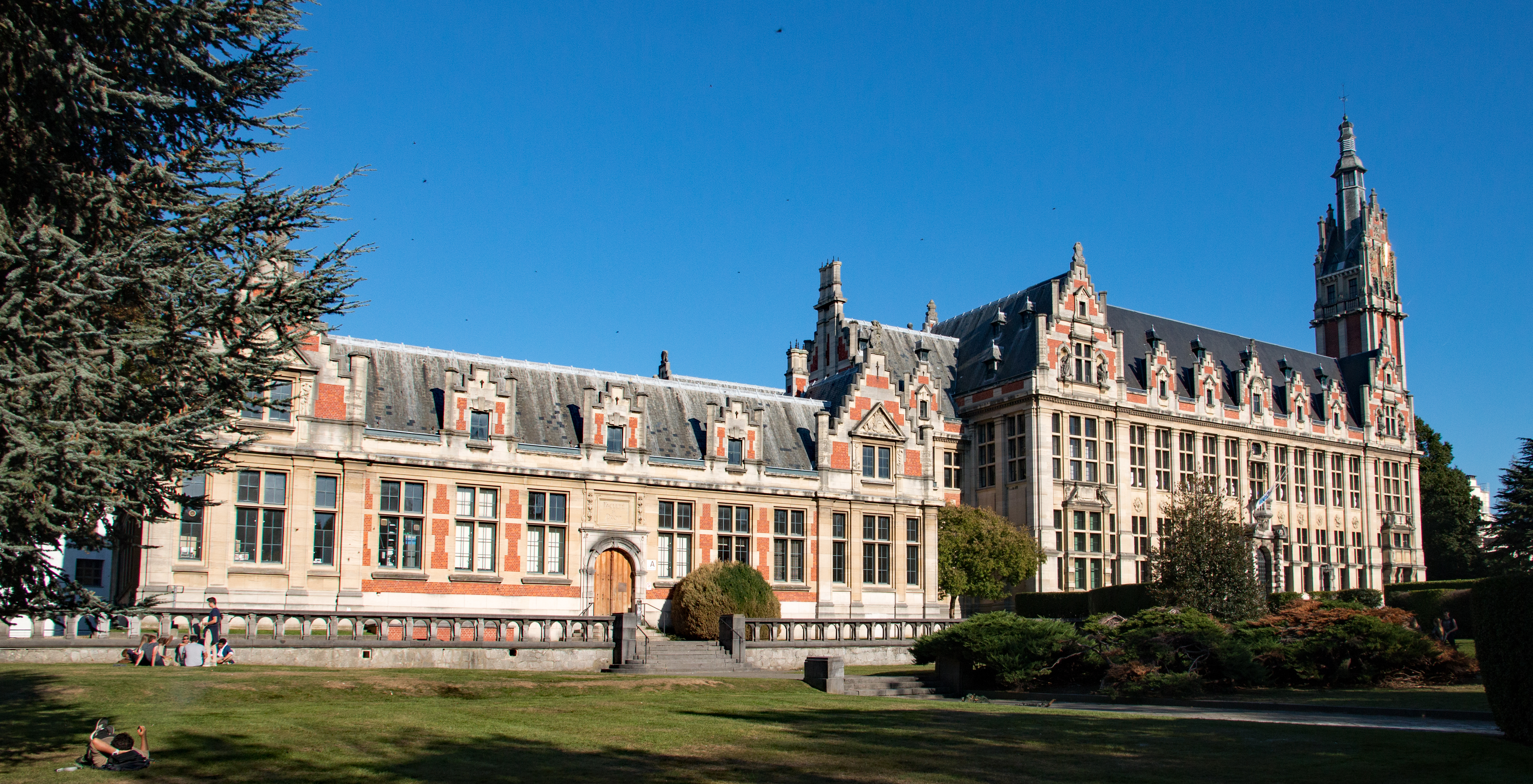
Main building of the Free University of Brussels, now the Solbosch/Solbos campus of the Université libre de Bruxelles (ULB)

The foundation of the Free University of Brussels must be seen within the social and political situation of Belgium in those days. Already in 1831, a group of intellectuals pointed to the advantages of a university in the capital. One of them was Auguste Baron, but also the astronomer and statistician Adolphe Quetelet.

The Belgian bishops founded a new Catholic University of Mechelen to regain the influence on higher education they lost under French and Dutch rule. The government was to close the State University of Leuven, which Willem I founded, to replace the old university that closed under French rule and let it reopen as a Catholic University. The anticlericals considered this as a declaration of war. Auguste Baron, who had become a member of the Les Amis Philantropes, could convince Verhaegen of his idea, and on 24 June 1834, Verhaegen presented the plan in a speech during a banquet of his Lodge:

If we speak about the light of the century, we let thus everything to do promote it, but also, in the first place, protect it because our enemies are ready to extinguish it. We must rise against fanaticism, we must attack it frontally and with eradicate it to its roots. Compared with the schools they wish to set up, we must place a pure morally justified education, about which we will keep the control. (...) A free university should form the counterbalance for the so-called catholic university.

The speech caused so much enthusiasm that the plan immediately collected money. Already on 20 November of that year the Free University of Brussels was created in the Gothic Room of Brussels' Town Hall. Although he was not the actual inventor of a university in Brussels, he was to be its motivating force. He was first an ordinary member of the Council of Management, but already rapidly, he took control of the university as inspector-administrator. Indeed, in the first fifteen years of its existence, the Free University of Brussels had it particularly difficult financially. At that time, the state provided no subsidies or study grants. Besides the college money and some support from the city of Brussels, its income came from grants. Some professors, such as Verhaegen, received no income for their teaching. In those years, Verhaegen organized fundraising events to help the university consolidate its position. Above all, he gave the university an ideal, a mission statement, which he summarized in a declaration he wrote. He launched it in 1854 in a speech to King Leopold I:

Under these freedoms, which were refused or opposed, there is one, freedom of research, which places the university of Brussels above all other, which is the essence of sciences. Being able to examine what is of great value for mankind and for society, free from each politically and religious authority (...) to reach towards the sources of truth and the good, (...) see here your Majesty, the role of our university, its reason for existence.

Free research was for him "the independence of the human reason", but he realized already too well that this reason came in collision with religious dogmas:

I say that it is impossible to provide higher education without more or less touching to the dogmas of this or that church.

=== Celebrations ===
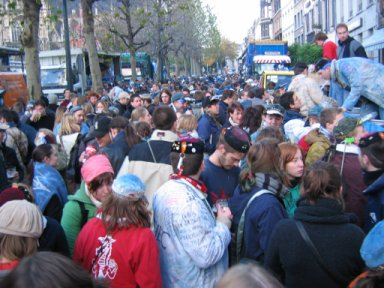
Saint Verhaegen festivities at the Square du Grand Sablon/Grote Zavelsquare, Brussels

Students of both successor institutions celebrate Verhaegen's founding of the Free University of Brussels annually with an event called Saint Verhaegen. The formal celebration consists of faculty honouring Verhaegen by placing flowers at his tomb. Concurrently, thousands of students from both universities have a daylong party and procession through downtown Brussels.

== Sources ==
- Pierre-Théodore Verhaegen
- Pierre-Théodore Verhaegen
- Pierre-Théodore Verhaegen (1796–1862), VUBPRESS, 1996

Political offices
Preceded by Charles Liedts	President of the Chamber of Representatives; 1848–1852	Succeeded by Noël Delfosse
Preceded by Josse Joseph de Lehaye	President of the Chamber of Representatives; 1857–1859	Succeeded by Auguste Orts
Masonic offices
Preceded by Eugène Defacqz	Grand Master of the Grand Orient of Belgium; 1854–1862	Succeeded by Joseph Van Schoor
