= Paul Kronacker =

Belgian politician

President of the Chamber of Representatives
- In office 11 November 1958 – 27 April 1961
- Preceded by: Camille Huysmans
- Succeeded by: Achille Van Acker

Personal details
- Born: 5 November 1897 Antwerp, Belgium
- Died: 3 February 1994 (aged 96) Kapellen, Belgium
- Party: Liberal Party
- Education: Free University of Brussels

Baron Paul Georges Marie Kronacker (5 November 1897 – 3 February 1994) was a Belgian chemist and liberal politician for the Liberal Party. From 1958 to 1961 he was President of the Belgian Chamber of Representatives.

== Education ==
He graduated as a chemist at the Université libre de Bruxelles (Brussels, Belgium).

== Career ==
After his graduation, he started his career in the sugar industry. During World War II he was military attaché of the Belgian government in London and he led, for the same government, many missions to the United States and Canada with regard to the provision of Belgium.

Kronacker was a member of the Belgian Parliament from 1939 up to 1968, firstly in the Belgian Senate (1939–1946), subsequently in the Belgian Chamber of Representatives (1946–1968).

From 1958 up to 1961 he was President of the Belgian Chamber of Representatives. During his parliamentary career he showed a big interest for economic questions and foreign policy.

He was minister without portfolio in the governments Pierlot (27 September 1944 – 7 February 1945) and Van Acker I (12 February 1945 – 2 August 1945) and minister of provision in the governments Van Acker II (2 August 1945 – 9 January 1946), Van Acker III (13 March 1946 – 10 July 1946) and Huysmans (3 August 1946 – 12 March 1947). In 1963, he was appointed as Minister of State.

== Bibliography ==
- Kronacker, P., Souvenirs de paix et de guerre, Fayard, Paris, 1973
- Kronacker, P., Souvenirs d'une mission, in : Le Flambeau, 1940–1947, p. 320–332.

== Sources ==
- Bourgeois, P., Paul Kronacker, ministre des Approvisionnements, in : La Face à Main, 18 August 1945.
- Denuit, D., Entretien avec le baron Kronacker, ancien ministre des Approvisionnements, in : Le Soir, 4 January 1973.
- Paul Kronacker

Political offices
Preceded by Camille Huysmans	President of the Chamber of Representatives; 1958–1961	Succeeded by Achille Van Acker
