= Eliane Tillieux =

Belgian politician (born 1966)

Éliane Tillieux
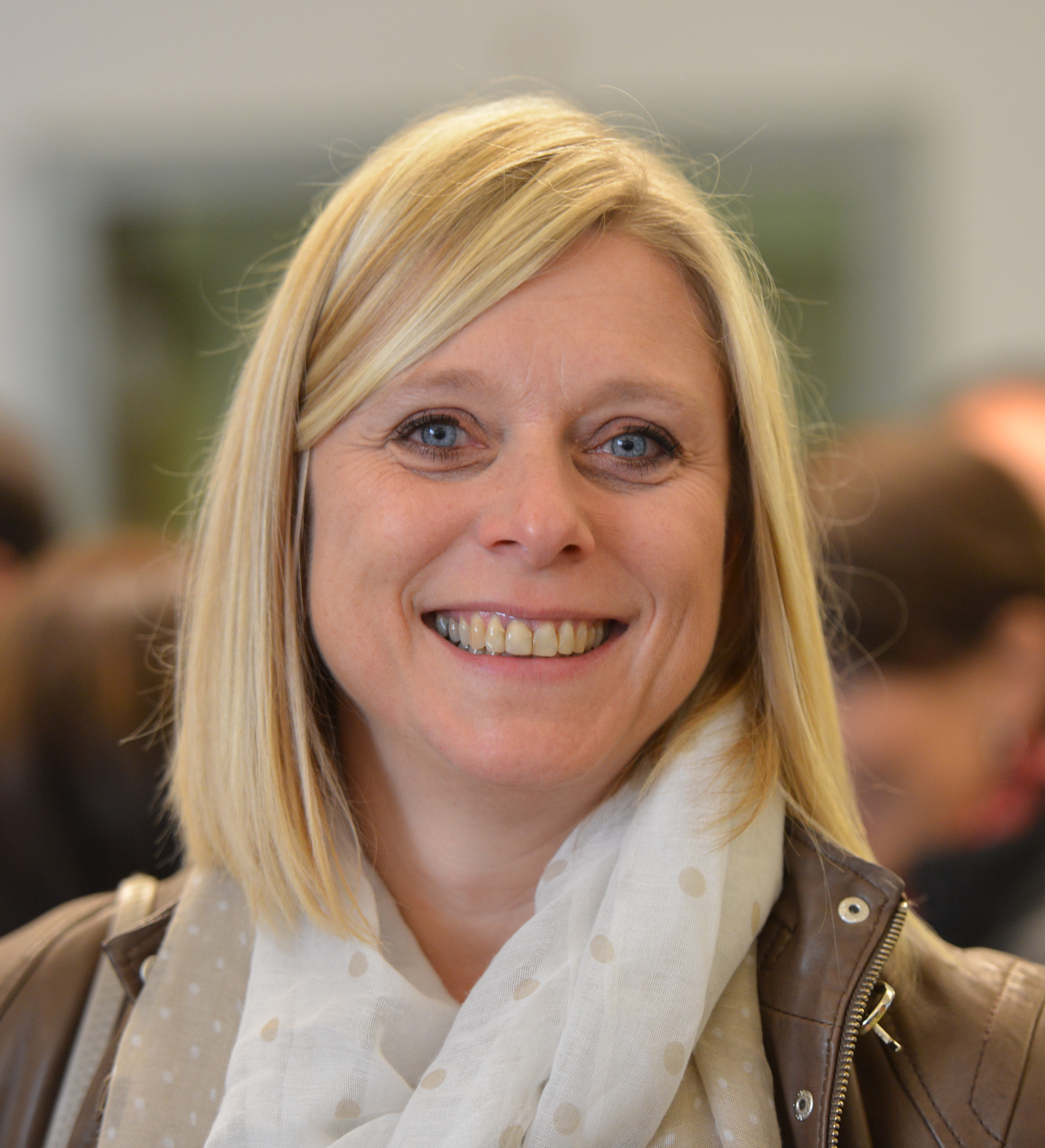
- Tillieux in 2015

President of the Belgian Chamber of Representatives
- In office 13 October 2020 – 10 July 2024
- Preceded by: Patrick Dewael
- Succeeded by: Peter De Roover

Personal details
- Born: 25 April 1966 (age 60) Namur, Belgium
- Party: Socialist Party
- Education: Université libre de Bruxelles

Éliane Tillieux (French pronunciation: [eljan tiljø]; born 1966) is a Belgian Socialist politician from Namur (Wallonia) and the first woman to serve as president of the Belgian Chamber of Representatives.

== Early life and education ==
Tillieux was born in Namur on 25 April 1966 and in 1989 graduated from the Institut Supérieur de Traducteurs et Interprètes de Bruxelles (now a department of Université libre de Bruxelles). She also obtained an accountancy certificate from the Institut d'Enseignement Commercial de Namur (1992) and graduated Master of Public Administration from the Solvay Brussels School of Economics and Management (1993). She worked as a linguist in the financial sector and as a manager in the Société Wallonne de Distribution d'Eau, where she advanced to be head of the commercial division's customer service department before resigning in 2004 to enter politics full-time.

== Political career ==
From 2000 to 2004 Tillieux was a provincial councillor for the Province of Namur. She sat in the regional Walloon Parliament from 2004 to 2009, and served in the Walloon Government headed by Rudy Demotte from 2009 to 2014 as Minister for Social Action, Health and Equal Opportunities. She was the only woman of ministerial rank in Demotte's government. She became minister of Employment and Training in the Walloon Government headed by Paul Magnette from 2014 to 2017, again as the only female minister.

In the 2019 Belgian federal election (26 May) Tillieux was elected to the Belgian Chamber of Representatives. The following 30 September 2020 she became the Socialist Party's candidate as president of the chamber, being sworn in on 13 October 2020.

Political offices
Preceded by Patrick Dewael	President of the Belgian Chamber of Representatives; 2020–2024	Succeeded by Peter De Roover
