= Joseph Lebeau =

Belgian politician (1794–1865)

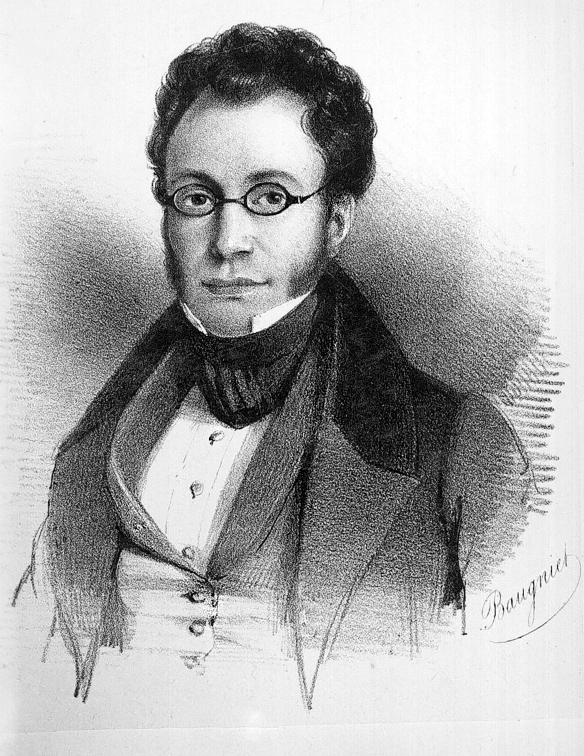

Prime Minister of Belgium
- In office 18 April 1840 – 13 April 1841
- Monarch: Leopold I
- Preceded by: Barthélémy de Theux de Meylandt
- Succeeded by: Jean-Baptiste Nothomb
- In office 28 March 1831 – 21 July 1831
- Monarch: Erasme Louis Surlet de Chokier (Regent)
- Preceded by: Etienne Constantin de Gerlache
- Succeeded by: Felix de Muelenaere

Personal details
- Born: 3 January 1794 Huy, Prince-Bishopric of Liège (now Belgium)
- Died: 19 March 1865 (aged 71) Huy, Belgium
- Party: Liberal Party
- Education: University of Liège

Jean Louis Joseph Lebeau (French pronunciation: [ʒɑ̃ lwi ʒozɛf ləbo]; 3 January 1794 – 19 March 1865) was a Belgian liberal statesman who served as prime minister of Belgium from 28 March to 21 July 1831, and again from 1840 to 1841.

== Biography ==
Born in Huy, he received his early education from an uncle who was parish priest in Hannut, and became a clerk. He raised money to study Law at the University of Liège, and was called to the bar association in 1819. While in Liège, he formed a close friendship with Charles Rogier and Paul Devaux, together with whom he founded at Liège in 1824 the Mathieu Laensbergh, later renamed Le Politique. The journal helped unite the Catholic Party with the Liberals in their opposition to the cabinet, without showing open disaffection toward the United Kingdom of the Netherlands.

== Political career ==
Lebeau had not aimed for the separation of the Netherlands and Belgium, but his hand was forced by the August Revolution of 1830. He was sent by his native district to the National Congress, and became minister of foreign affairs in March 1831 during the interim regency of Érasme-Louis Surlet de Chokier. By proposing the election of Leopold of Saxe-Coburg as King of the Belgians he secured a benevolent attitude on the part of the United Kingdom. But the restoration to the Netherlands of part of the duchies of Limburg and Luxembourg provoked a heated opposition to the 1839 Treaty of London, and Lebeau was accused of treachery to Belgian interests.

He resigned the direction of foreign affairs on the accession of King Leopold, but in the next year became minister of justice. He was elected deputy for Brussels in 1833, and retained his seat until 1848. Differences with the king led to his retirement in 1834. He was subsequently governor of the Province of Namur (1838), ambassador to the Frankfurt Diet (1839), and in 1840 he formed a short-lived Liberal ministry. From this time he held no office of state, although he continued his energetic support of liberal and anti-clerical measures. He died at Huy.

== Works ==
Lebeau published La Belgique depuis 1847 (Brussels, 4 vols., 1852), Lettres aux électeurs belges (8 vols., Brussels, 1853–1856). His Souvenirs personnels et correspondance diplomatique 1824–1841 (Brussels, 1883) were edited by A. Freson.

== Honours ==
- Officer Order of Leopold.

== See also ==
- Liberal Party

Political offices
Preceded by Etienne Constantin de Gerlache	Prime Minister of Belgium; 1831	Succeeded by Felix de Muelenaere
Preceded by Barthélémy de Theux de Meylandt	Prime Minister of Belgium; 1840–1841	Succeeded by Jean-Baptiste Nothomb
