= Désiré Vervoort =

Belgian lawyer and politician

President of the Chamber of Representatives
- In office 23 November 1860 – 15 December 1863
- Preceded by: Auguste Orts
- Succeeded by: Ernest Louis de Gonzague Vandenpeereboom

Personal details
- Born: 11 April 1810 Antwerp, France (now Belgium)
- Died: 9 July 1886 (aged 76) Watermael-Boitsfort, Belgium
- Party: Liberal Party

Désiré Jean Léon Vervoort (11 April 1810, in Antwerp – 9 July 1886, in Watermael-Boitsfort) was a Belgian lawyer and liberal politician. He served as a member of the Belgian parliament and President of the Belgian Chamber of Representatives from 23 November 1860 until 27 May 1863.

== See also ==
- Liberal Party
- Liberalism in Belgium

== Sources ==
- Désiré Jean Léon Vervoort
- Remy, F., in : Biographie Nationale, Brussels, Académie Royale des Sciences, des Lettres et des Beaux Arts, 1866–1986, XXXVIII, 1973–1974, kol. 807–809.
- De Paepe, Jean-Luc, Raindorf-Gérard, Christiane (ed.), Le Parlement Belge 1831-1894. Données Biographiques, Brussels, Académie Royale de Belgique, 1996, p. 604.

Political offices
| Preceded by Auguste Orts | President of the Chamber of Representatives; 1860–1863 | Succeeded by Ernest Louis de Gonzague Vandenpeereboom |
