= Frans Van Cauwelaert =

Belgian lawyer and politician (1880–1961)

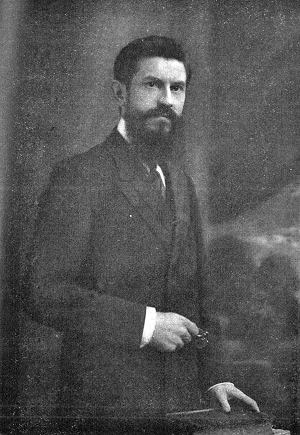

President of the Chamber of Representatives
- In office 21 April 1939 – 27 April 1954
- Preceded by: Camille Huysmans
- Succeeded by: Camille Huysmans

Personal details
- Born: 10 January 1880 Onze-Lieve-Vrouw-Lombeek, Belgium
- Died: 17 May 1961 (aged 81) Antwerp, Belgium
- Party: Catholic Party

Frans Van Cauwelaert (10 January 1880 – 17 May 1961), was a Belgian Roman Catholic politician and lawyer.

Van Cauwelaert was born at Onze-Lieve-Vrouw-Lombeek. He was a member of the Flemish movement, Professor of psychology at the Katholieke Universiteit Leuven (Leuven), mayor of Antwerp (1921–1932), and co-founder of the daily journal De Standaard.

He fought for using Dutch at the University of Ghent, together with the Socialist Camille Huysmans and the liberal Louis Franck. In 1911 they proposed a bill to the Belgian parliament, which originated from Lodewijk De Raet for the usage of Dutch at the University of Ghent instead of French.

Frans Van Cauwelaert was a member of the Belgian Chamber of Representatives from 1910 until his death in 1961. He was appointed Minister of State in 1931. In the government led by Charles de Broqueville, Van Cauwelaert was minister for Commerce, Middle Class and Foreign Trade (January–June 1934) and Minister of Agriculture and Economical Affairs (June–November 1934). Van Cauwelaert then served in the government led by Georges Theunis as the minister of Agriculture and the Middle class and as minister of Public Works (November 1934 – January 1935), until he resigned due to a financial scandal. From 1939 to 1954, he served as President of the Belgian Chamber of Representatives. During the Second World War Van Cauwelaert mainly lived in New York . He carried out assignments for the Belgian government in exile in South America and in England . In New York, Van Cauwelaert also thought about post-war European unification and corresponded about it with prominent European thinkers such as Robert Schuman and Richard Coudenhove-Kalergi . In his letters, Van Cauwelaert opposed unbridled European unification, with a full place for Germany. In his view, a unified Europe should keep Germany out and focus primarily on the transatlantic allies England and especially the United States . This anti-German attitude is not surprising, since Van Cauwelaert already had to flee from the German aggression against Belgium during the First World War. He then wrote in full wartime with the enemy image of Nazi Germany in mind. Van Cauwelaert judged that only a united Europe could restrain warlike Germany, but that Germany itself should not be part of that political union.

He died in Antwerp.

His youngest son Jan became a Catholic bishop and died aged 102 as one of the oldest bishops in the Church.

== See also ==
- Catholic Party

== Sources ==
- Reginald DE SCHRIJVER, Frans van Cauwelaerts' visie op de Vlaamse Beweging, in: Onze Alma Mater, 1972
- Reginald DE SCHRIJVER, Frans van Cauwelaert in zijn gedenkschriften over de jaren 1895–1918, in: Dietsche Warande en Belfort, 1972
- Th. Luykx and M. Platel, Politieke geschiedenis van België, 2 vol., Kluwer, 1985
- M. VAN MECHELEN, De jonge Frans van Cauwelaert, 1880–1910, licentiaatsverhandeling (onuitgegeven), KU Leuven, 1974.
- M. VAN MECHELEN, Kroniek van Frans van Cauwelaert, 1880–1961, 1980
- Leo TINDEMANS, Atlantisch Europa. Frans van Cauwelaert en de Europese eenmaking, 1981
- M. VAN MECHELEN, Uit de briefwisseling van Frans van Cauwelaert, 1985–1986
- Lode WILS, De Messias van Vlaanderen. Frans van Cauwelaert, 1880–1961, 1998
- Lode WILS, Frans van Cauwelaert, in: Nieuwe encyclopedie van de Vlaamse Beweging, Tielt, 1998.

Political offices
Preceded by Camille Huysmans	President of the Chamber of Representatives; 1939–1954	Succeeded by Camille Huysmans
