= Hubert Joseph Dolez =

Belgian lawyer and politician (1808–1880)

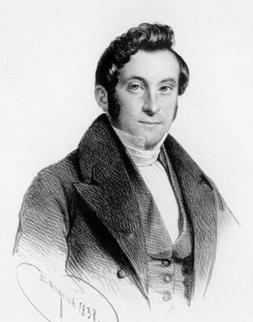

President of the Chamber of Representatives
- In office 23 October 1867 – 11 August 1870
- Preceded by: Ernest Louis de Gonzague Vandenpeereboom
- Succeeded by: Charles Vilain

Personal details
- Born: 16 March 1808; Mons, France (now Belgium)
- Died: 17 March 1880 (aged 72); Brussels, Belgium
- Political party: Liberal Party

Hubert Joseph Dolez (16 March 1808 – 17 March 1880) was a Belgian lawyer and liberal politician.

As a politician, he was a member of the Belgian parliament, President of the Belgian Chamber of Representatives from 23 October 1867 until 20 May 1870 and Minister of State.

== See also ==
- Liberal Party
- Liberalism in Belgium

== Sources ==
- Hubert Joseph Dolez
- Wellens, R., in : Biographie Nationale, Brussels, Académie Royale des Sciences, des Lettres et des Beaux Arts, 1866–1986, XXXV, 1969–1970, kol. 190–192.
- Jadot, J.M., in : Biographie Coloniale Belge – Belgische Koloniale Biografie, Brussels, Koninklijk Belgisch Koloniaal Instituut, III, kol. 247.
- De Paepe, Jean-Luc, Raindorf-Gérard, Christiane (ed.), Le Parlement Belge 1831-1894. Données Biographiques, Brussels, Académie Royale de Belgique, 1996, p. 270.

Political offices
Preceded by Ernest Louis de Gonzague Vandenpeereboom	President of the Chamber of Representatives; 1867–1870	Succeeded by Charles Vilain
