= Camille Huysmans =

Belgian politician (1871–1968)

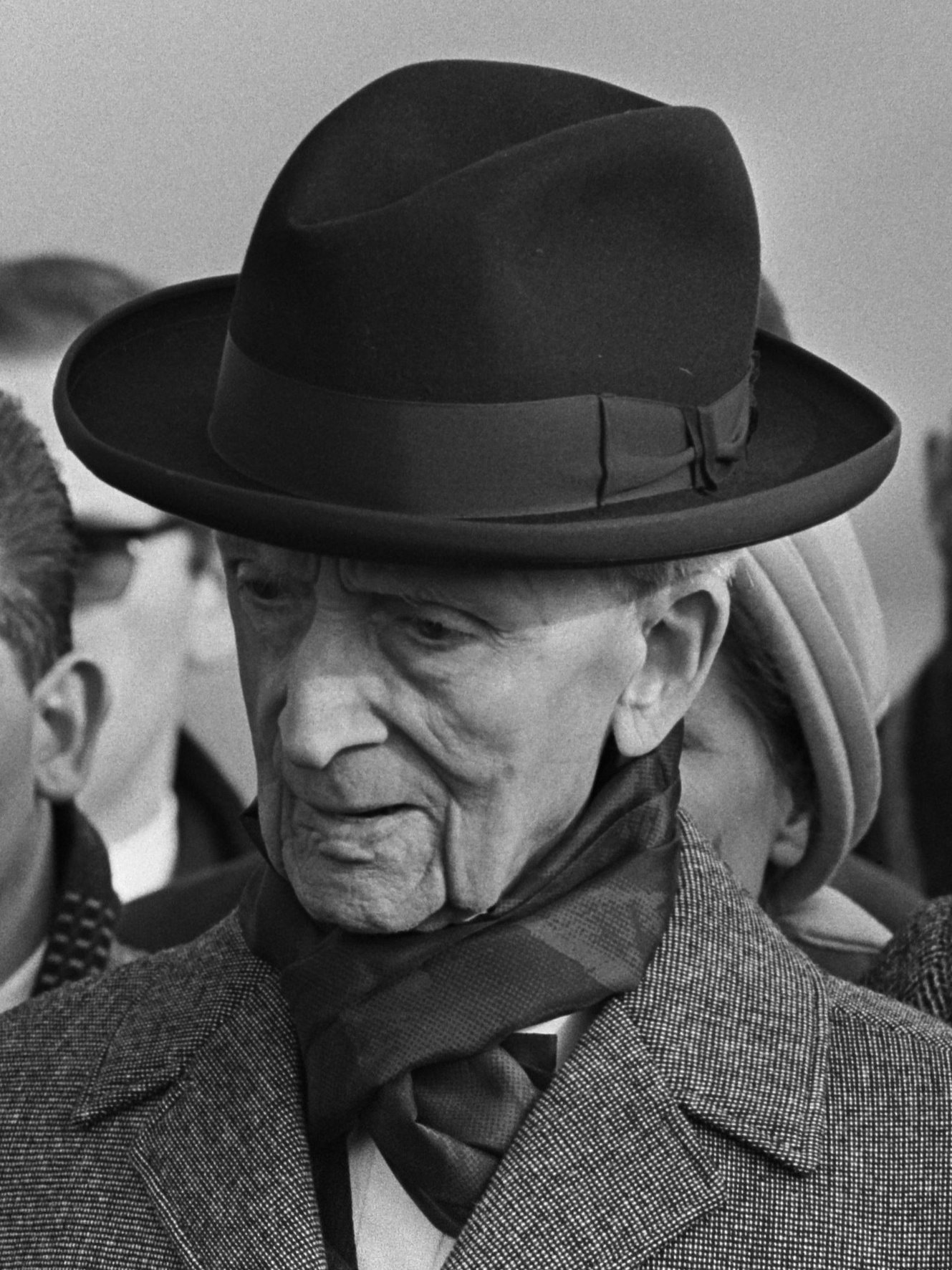
- Huysmans in 1966

Prime Minister of Belgium
- In office 3 August 1946 – 20 March 1947
- Monarch: Leopold III
- Regent: Prince Charles
- Preceded by: Achille Van Acker
- Succeeded by: Paul-Henri Spaak

President of the Chamber of Representatives
- In office 27 April 1954 – 11 November 1958
- Preceded by: Frans Van Cauwelaert
- Succeeded by: Paul Kronacker
- In office 23 June 1936 – 21 April 1939
- Preceded by: Jules Poncelet
- Succeeded by: Frans Van Cauwelaert

Personal details
- Born: 26 May 1871 Bilzen, Belgium
- Died: 25 February 1968 (aged 96) Antwerp, Belgium
- Party: Socialist Party
- Other political affiliations: Belgian Labour Party
- Education: University of Liège

Jean Joseph Camille Huysmans (born as Camiel Hansen 26 May 1871 – 25 February 1968) was a Belgian politician who served as the prime minister of Belgium from 1946 to 1947.

== Biography ==
He studied German philology at the University of Liège and was a teacher from 1893 to 1897 while he studied for his doctorate in German philology.

Huysmans joined the Belgische Werkliedenpartij (BWP), the predecessor of the Belgische Socialistische Partij (BSP), at a young age. He became a journalist for many socialist periodicals until 1904 and was thereafter active in the labour unions.

Between 1905 and 1922 Huysmans was secretary of the Second International. In that function he had many contacts with Sun Yat-sen, the leader of the first Chinese revolution, in 1911. His main task was creating an active peace function. At the Socialist Conference in Stockholm in 1917 he pleaded against continuing the war.

He was a fighter for the Flemish movement and fought for using Dutch at the University of Ghent. As minister of arts and education he could pave the way for the Dutch language. In 1911 he proposed a bill, drafted by Lodewijk De Raet, together with the Roman Catholic Frans Van Cauwelaert and the liberal Louis Franck, for the usage of Dutch at the University of Ghent. However, owing to World War I, the University of Ghent would become a Flemish university only in 1930.

In World War II he fled to London. He regained the function as secretary between 1939 and 1944, also as acting chairman. After World War II (at age 75) he became the 34th prime minister and led a government of socialists, liberals and communists. With an insufficient majority, this government lasted not long. In the next government, he was the minister of education.

In domestic affairs, a raft of progressive reforms were carried out during Huysmans's time as 34th prime minister. A ministerial order of October 1946 laid down special provisions for safeguarding workers in wire rope factories, while an order was passed in December 1946 for factories manufacturing sugar and molasses alcohol which contained health and safety provisions. In January 1947, legislation was passed providing for a uniform allowance for the children of disabled workers, and legislative orders were issued in January and February 1947 providing for the establishment of a National Office for the Co-ordination of Family Allowances. In addition, a legislative order of 28 February 1947 supplemented and amended the provisions of an August 1930 law by extending the scope of family allowances for wage-earners, while another order issued that same month authorised the National Association for Cheap Housing to raise a loan of one thousand million Belgian francs to contribute towards the costs of a housebuilding programme for miners.

He remained very popular until old age. The national tribute for his 80th birthday attracted 100,000 visitors. At the age of 83 he became chairman of the Chamber of Representatives (lower house). He was a freemason, a member of the lodge Les Amis Philanthropes of the Grand Orient of Belgium in Brussels.

Huysmans is considered a friend of the Jewish people, mainly because of his friendly attitude towards Jewish immigrants in Antwerp in the years 1920–1940 and the Zionist movement. There are streets bearing his name in the cities of Netanya and Haifa in Israel.

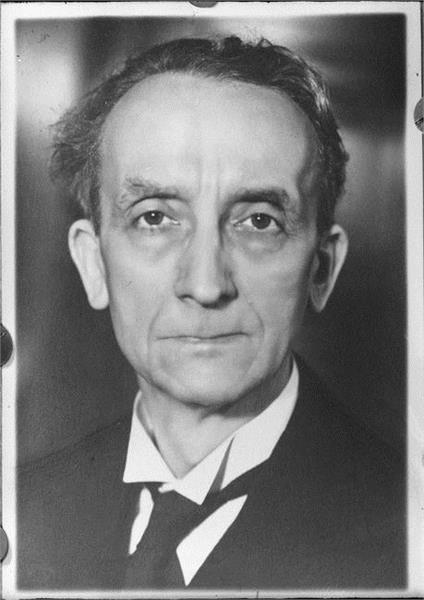
Camille Huysmans 1947

== Functions ==
- Councillor in Brussels (1908–1921)
- Education Schepen of Antwerp (1921–1933)
- Mayor of Antwerp (1933–1940 and 1944–1946)
- Councillor in Antwerp (1946–1968)
- Member of the lower house (1910–1965)
- Chairman of the lower house (1936–1939 and 1954–1958)
- Minister of Arts and Education (1925–1927)
- Prime Minister (1946–1947)
- Minister of Education (1947–1949)

== Honours ==
- Belgium: Minister of State, by Royal Decree.
- Belgium: member of the Royal Academie.
- Belgium: Grand Cordon in the Order of Leopold.
- Belgium: knight Grand Cross in the Order of the Crown.
- Knight grand Cross in the Swedish Order of the Polar Star 1937.
- Commander of the Legion of Honour.
- Order of the British Empire.

== Correspondence with Lenin ==
In his first term as secretary of the Second International he corresponded with Lenin between 1905 and 1914. The letters were published in 1963.

Political offices
Preceded by Frans Van Cauwelaert	Mayor of Antwerp; 1933–1940	Succeeded by Leo Delwaide
Preceded by Jules Poncelet	President of the Chamber of Representatives; 1936–1939	Succeeded by Frans Van Cauwelaert
Preceded by Emile Van Put	Mayor of Antwerp; 1944–1946	Succeeded by Willem Eekelers
Preceded by Achille Van Acker	Prime Minister of Belgium; 1946–1947	Succeeded by Paul-Henri Spaak
Preceded by Frans Van Cauwelaert	President of the Chamber of Representatives; 1954–1958	Succeeded by Paul Kronacker
Records
Preceded by Juan José Estrada	Oldest living state leader 11 July 1967 – 24 May 1968	Succeeded by Alfredo Solf y Muro
