= Jules Guillery =

Belgian politician (1824–1902)

President of the Chamber of Representatives
- In office 13 November 1878 – 22 March 1881
- Preceded by: Charles Rogier
- Succeeded by: Joseph Jules Descamps

Personal details
- Born: 14 March 1824 Nivelles, United Kingdom of the Netherlands (now Belgium)
- Died: 7 February 1902 (aged 77) Elsene, Belgium
- Party: Liberal Party

Jules Louis Guillery (14 March 1824 – 7 February 1902) was a Belgian lawyer and liberal politician.

As a politician, he was a member of the Belgian parliament and President of the Belgian Chamber of Representatives from 13 November 1878 until 10 March 1881 and Minister of State.

== See also ==
- Liberal Party
- Liberalism in Belgium

== Sources ==
- Jules Louis Guillery
- Lebrocquy, G., Types et Profils parlementaires, Paris, Lachaud & Burdin, 1873, p. 191-192.
- Annales de la Société Archéologique de l'arrondissement de Nivelles, T. X, Nivelles, 1911, p. 258.
- De Paepe, Jean-Luc, Raindorf-Gérard, Christiane (ed.), Le Parlement Belge 1831-1894. Données Biographiques, Brussels, Académie Royale de Belgique, 1996, p. 332.
- Serwy, V., La coopération en Belgique. Dictionnaire biographique, Brussels, 1952, p. 166.

Political offices
Preceded by Charles Rogier	President of the Chamber of Representatives; 1878–1881	Succeeded by Joseph Jules Descamps
