= List of presidents of the Chamber of Representatives of Belgium =

The president of the Chamber of Representatives (Dutch: Voorzitter van de Kamer van Volksvertegenwoordigers, French: Président de la Chambre des Représentants) is the presiding officer of the lower house of the Federal Parliament of Belgium. The current president of the Chamber of Representatives is Peter De Roover of the New Flemish Alliance.

The longest-serving president is Frans Van Cauwelaert.

No.	Name	Party	Entered office	Left office
1.	Etienne Constantin de Gerlache	Catholic	September 10, 1831	July 18, 1832
2.	Jean Raikem	Catholic	November 15, 1832	May 24, 1839
3.	Isidore Fallon	Catholic	November 15, 1839	September 10, 1842
4.	Jean Raikem	Catholic	November 9, 1842	April 6, 1843
5.	Charles Liedts	Liberal Party	November 17, 1843	May 20, 1848
6.	Pierre-Théodore Verhaegen	Liberal Party	June 28, 1848	April 3, 1852
7.	Noël Joseph Auguste Delfosse	Liberal Party	October 26, 1852	April 24, 1855
8.	Josse Joseph de Lehaye	Liberal Party	April 25, 1855	June 13, 1857
9.	Pierre-Théodore Verhaegen	Liberal Party	December 17, 1857	May 30, 1859
10.	Auguste Englebert Pierre Orts	Liberal Party	July 19, 1859	July 18, 1860
11.	Désiré Jean Léon Vervoort	Liberal Party	November 23, 1860	May 27, 1863
12.	Ernest Louis de Gonzague Vandenpeereboom	Liberal Party	December 15, 1863	October 23, 1867
13.	Hubert Joseph Dolez	Liberal Party	October 23, 1867	May 20, 1870
14.	Charles Vilain XIIII	Catholic Party	August 11, 1870	July 26, 1871
15.	Xavier Victor Thibaut	Catholic Party	November 15, 1871	May 29, 1878
16.	Charles Rogier	Liberal Party	August 1, 1878	August 26, 1878
17.	Jules Louis Guillery	Liberal Party	November 13, 1878	March 10, 1881
18.	Joseph Jules Descamps	Liberal Party	March 22, 1881	May 17, 1884
19.	Xavier Victor Thibaut	Catholic Party	July 23, 1884	September 2, 1884
20.	Théophile de Lantsheere	Catholic Party	November 12, 1884	November 25, 1895
21.	Auguste Marie François Beernaert	Catholic Party	January 30, 1895	May 7, 1900
22.	Louis Marie Joseph de Sadeleer	Catholic Party	July 18, 1900	November 8, 1901
23.	Frans Schollaert	Catholic Party	November 12, 1901	January 9, 1908
24.	Gérard Cooreman	Catholic Party	January 16, 1908	August 8, 1912
25.	Frans Schollaert	Catholic Party	November 12, 1912	June 29, 1917
26.	Prosper Poullet	Catholic Party	November 28, 1918	October 13, 1919
27.	Emile Brunet	BWP-POB	December 10, 1919	August 6, 1928
28.	Emile Tibbaut	Catholic Union	August 16, 1928	September 5, 1930
29.	Jules Poncelet	Catholic Union	November 11, 1930	April 13, 1936
30.	Camille Huysmans	BWP-POB	June 23, 1936	March 6, 1939
31.	Frans Van Cauwelaert	CVP–PSC	April 21, 1939	March 12, 1954
32.	Camille Huysmans	BSP-PSB	April 27, 1954	November 11, 1958
33.	Paul Kronacker	Liberal Party	November 11, 1958	April 17, 1961
34.	Achille Van Acker	BSP-PSB	April 27, 1961	March 10, 1974
35.	André Dequae	CVP	April 30, 1974	June 7, 1977
36.	Edmond Leburton	PS	June 7, 1977	April 3, 1979
37.	Charles-Ferdinand Nothomb	PSC	April 3, 1979	May 20, 1980
38.	Jean Defraigne	PRL	May 20, 1980	October 24, 1980
39.	Joseph Michel	PSC	October 24, 1980	December 18, 1981
40.	Jean Defraigne	PRL	December 18, 1981	January 19, 1988
41.	Erik Vankeirsbilck	CVP	January 19, 1988	May 10, 1988
42.	Charles-Ferdinand Nothomb	PSC	May 10, 1988	April 12, 1995
43.	Jos Dupré	CVP	June 8, 1995	June 28, 1995
44.	Raymond Langendries	PSC	June 28, 1995	July 1, 1999
45.	Herman De Croo	VLD	1 July 1999	12 July 2007
46.	Herman Van Rompuy	CD&V	12 July 2007	30 December 2008
47.	Patrick Dewael	Open VLD	30 December 2008	20 July 2010
48.	André Flahaut	PS	20 July 2010	30 June 2014
49.	Patrick Dewael	Open VLD	30 June 2014	14 October 2014
50.	Siegfried Bracke	N-VA	14 October 2014	26 May 2019
51.	Patrick Dewael	Open VLD	27 June 2019	1 October 2020
52.	Eliane Tillieux	PS	13 October 2020	10 July 2024
53.	Peter De Roover	N-VA	10 July 2024	

== See also ==
- Belgian Chamber of Representatives
- List of presidents of the Belgian Senate
- Politics of Belgium

== Sources ==
- "Factsheet on the President of the Chamber" (PDF). The Belgian Chamber of Representatives. Archived from the original (PDF) on 2007-09-27.
- Gerard, Emmanuel; Els Witte; Éliane Gubin; Jean-Pierre Nandrin (2003). Geschiedenis van de Belgische Kamer van Volksvertegenwoordigers: 1830-2002. Brussels: Kamer van Volksvertegenwoordigers. ISBN 90-807420-4-X.
