= Patrick Dewael =

Belgian politician (born 1955)

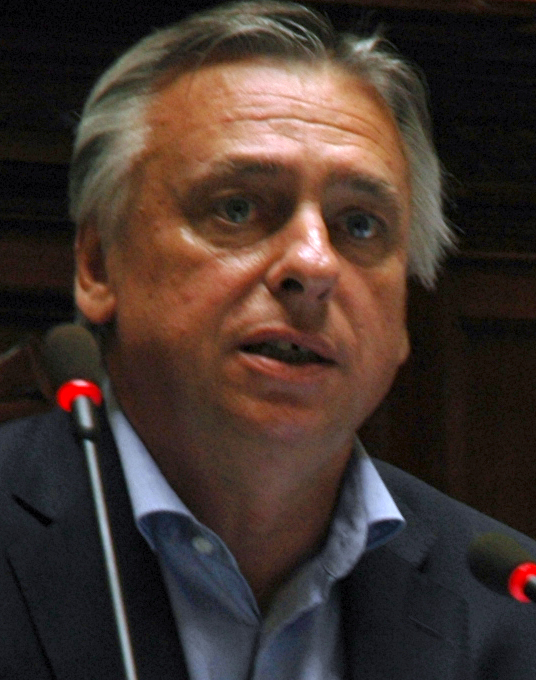

President of the Chamber of Representatives
- In office 27 June 2019 – 13 October 2020
- Preceded by: Siegfried Bracke
- Succeeded by: Eliane Tillieux
- In office 30 June 2014 – 14 October 2014
- Preceded by: André Flahaut
- Succeeded by: Siegfried Bracke
- In office 31 December 2008 – 19 July 2010
- Preceded by: Herman Van Rompuy
- Succeeded by: André Flahaut

Minister of the Interior
- In office 12 July 2003 – 22 December 2008
- Prime Minister: Guy Verhofstadt; Yves Leterme
- Preceded by: Antoine Duquesne
- Succeeded by: Guido De Padt

Minister-President of Flanders
- In office 13 July 1999 – 5 June 2003
- Preceded by: Luc Van den Brande
- Succeeded by: Renaat Landuyt (Acting)

Personal details
- Born: 13 October 1955 (age 70) Lier, Belgium
- Party: Anders
- Education: Free University of Brussels

Patrick Yvonne Hugo Dewael (Dutch: [ˈpɛtrɪɡ dəˈʋaːl]; (Note: Patrick in isolation: [ˈpɛtrɪk].) born 13 October 1955) is a liberal Belgian politician. A member of Anders (formerly Open Flemish Liberals and Democrats), he served as Minister-President of Flanders from 1999 to 2003.

He is the nephew of the late Herman Vanderpoorten and the cousin of Marleen Vanderpoorten, who served as Minister of Education in the Flemish Government led by Dewael. He obtained a degree in law and notariat from the Vrije Universiteit Brussel in Brussels. Dewael served as the President of the Chamber of Representatives from 2019 to 2020 and previously from 2008 to 2010.

== Political career ==
He was first elected to the Belgian Parliament in 1985. From 1985 to 1992 Dewael served for the PVV as Flemish minister of Culture in the governments led by Gaston Geens (II, III and IV). After the defeat of the liberals at the 1992 elections, Dewael served as an opposition MP until the liberals regained power in 1999.

He was Minister-President of the regional government of Flanders from 1999 to 2003. After the Federal elections of 2003, Dewael resigned as minister-president in order to serve as deputy prime minister and minister of the interior in the Belgian Federal government led by Guy Verhofstadt.

When Kurdish militant Fehriye Erdal was sentenced to 4 years' imprisonment by a Bruges court on 28 February 2006, it turned out that she had shaken off the Belgian secret service, which had had the responsibility of following her since 23 February 2006 (Erdal had been under house arrest since 2000). Both the Minister of Justice, Laurette Onkelinx, and the Minister of the Interior, Patrick Dewael came under fire for this incident.

He was deputy prime minister and minister for interior in the Leterme I Government, which took office on 20 March 2008. On 31 December 2008, he became president of the Chamber of Representatives. He was replaced as interior minister by Guido De Padt.

== Private life ==
Patrick Dewael lives in Tongeren, a town of which he is also the mayor.

Patrick Dewael was married to Marleen Van Doren, with whom he has three children. On 24 August 2005 Dewael released a press communiqué in which he announced that he was leaving his wife for VRT journalist Greet Op de Beeck. On 19 July 2019 he married Op de Beeck.

== Honours ==
- 2014 : Knight Grand Cross in the Order of Leopold II.
- 2002 : Knight Grand Cross Order of Merit of the Italian Republic, decree of 14 October 2002

== Notes ==
Political offices
Preceded by Luc Van den Brande	Minister-President of Flanders; 1999–2003	Succeeded by Bart Somers
Preceded by Antoine Duquesne	Minister of the Interior; 2003–2008	Succeeded by Guido De Padt
Preceded by Herman Van Rompuy	President of the Chamber of Representatives; 2008–2010	Succeeded by André Flahaut
Preceded by André Flahaut	President of the Chamber of Representatives; 2014	Succeeded by Siegfried Bracke
Preceded by Siegfried Bracke	President of the Chamber of Representatives; 2019–2020	Succeeded by Eliane Tillieux
