= Ernest Louis de Gonzague Vandenpeereboom =

Belgian doctor in law, industrialist and liberal politician

President of the Chamber of Representatives
- In office 15 December 1863 – 23 October 1867
- Preceded by: Désiré Vervoort
- Succeeded by: Hubert Joseph Dolez

Personal details
- Born: 12 July 1807; Kortrijk, France (now Belgium)
- Died: 11 November 1875 (aged 68); Ypres, Belgium
- Political party: Liberal Party

Ernest Louis de Gonzague Vandenpeereboom (12 July 1807 – 11 November 1875) was a Belgian doctor in law, industrialist (textile) and liberal politician.

As a politician, he was a member of the municipal council of Kortrijk, member of the provincial council of West Flanders, a member of the Belgian parliament and comissinar of the arrondissement of Kortrijk. He was President of the Belgian Chamber of Representatives from 15 December 1863 until 23 October 1867.

== See also ==
- Liberal Party
- Liberalism in Belgium

== Sources ==
- Ernest Louis de Gonzague Vandenpeereboom
- De Paepe, Jean-Luc, Raindorf-Gérard, Christiane (ed.), Le Parlement Belge 1831-1894. Données Biographiques, Brussels, Académie Royale de Belgique, 1996, p. 561.

Political offices
Preceded by Désiré Vervoort	President of the Chamber of Representatives; 1863–1867	Succeeded by Hubert Joseph Dolez
