= Noël Delfosse =

Belgian politician (1801–1858)

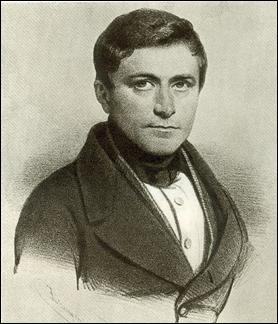

President of the Chamber of Representatives
- In office 26 October 1852 – 25 April 1855
- Preceded by: Pierre-Théodore Verhaegen
- Succeeded by: Josse Joseph de Lehaye

Personal details
- Born: 9 March 1801 Liège, France (now Belgium)
- Died: 22 February 1858 (aged 56) Liège, Belgium
- Party: Liberal Party
- Education: University of Liège

Noël Joseph Auguste Delfosse (French: [dɛlfos]; 9 March 1801 – 22 February 1858) was a Belgian lawyer, industrialist and liberal politician.

== Biography ==
Delfosse graduated as a doctor in Law at the University of Liège and started his career in Liège as an attorney.

He was selected as a liberal representative in the municipal council after the Belgian Revolution in 1830, and in 1836 to the Provincial council of the Province of Liège and in 1840 as a representative of Liège into the Belgian Chamber of Representatives, and in 1848 was elected vice-president of the chamber and remained in this office until 1852.

His decisive character and his talent as a convincing speaker, supported his political influence in the years 1848 and 1849, where he mainly tried to secure Belgium from the influences of the French movement. At that time he famously exclaimed in the chamber: La liberté française pour faire le tour du monde n'a pas besoin de passer par chez nous! (in English "French freedom to travel around the world does not need to go through our region!") From 1853 until 1855 he was the President of the Belgian Chamber of Representatives.

In 1854 and 1855, he rejected twice the offer to create a new Ministry. In December 1857 he was appointed in the government of Rogier-Frère with the title of Minister of State, which did not prevent him to speak against the measures of the government, when they seemed to him incompatible with the principles of liberalism.

== See also ==
- Liberal Party
- Liberalism in Belgium

== Sources ==
- Alvin, A., in : Biographie Nationale, Brussel, Académie Royale des Sciences, des Lettres et des Beaux Arts, 1866–1986, V, 1876, kol. 413–420.
- Mémorial de la Province de Liège 1836–1986, Liège, p. 184.

Political offices
Preceded by Pierre-Théodore Verhaegen	President of the Chamber of Representatives; 1852–1855	Succeeded by Josse Joseph de Lehaye
