= Louis Franck (politician) =

Belgian lawyer and politician (1868–1937)

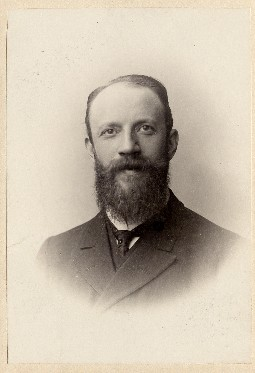
- Louis Franck
- Born: Louis Marie François Franck; 28 November 1868; Antwerp, Belgium
- Died: 31 December 1937 (aged 69); Wijnegem, Belgium
- Occupations: politician, lawyer, statesman

Louis Marie François Franck (28 November 1868 – 31 December 1937) was a Belgian lawyer and liberal politician.

== Education ==
He was born in Antwerp, and began his education at the Koninklijk Atheneum (E: Royal Atheneum) of Antwerp, where he was influenced by the Flemish writer and liberal politician Jan van Beers, and he obtained a law degree at the Free University of Brussels (now split into the Université libre de Bruxelles and the Vrije Universiteit Brussel). As a student, he was one of the co-founders of the secular humanist Cercle Universitaire (1887), he wrote for the Journal des Etudiants (1889) and in 1890 he was founder-President of the Cercle Universitaire de Criminologie.

== Career ==
In 1890, he set up practice as a lawyer in Antwerp and specialized himself in international marine law. As the president of the Conférence du Jeune Barreau (Young Lawyers' Conference) and as a member of the Vlaamse Conferentie der Balie (Flemish Bar Association), he wanted to promote the use of Dutch in court (which was in French in those days). In 1899, he was one of the co-founders of the Bond der Vlaamsche Rechtsgeleerden (League of Flemish Lawyers), of which he became president in 1912.

In 1906, he put himself candidate as a member of the Belgian parliament, of which he would remain a member up to 1926. He strived for a gradual improvement of the usage of the Dutch language in Flanders, such as with the law Franck-Paul Segers on the usage of Dutch in secondary education in the public schools (1910). Since then he fought on the side of the Roman catholic Frans Van Cauwelaert and the socialist Camille Huysmans (together they were called the three crowing cocks) for the usage of Dutch at the University of Ghent. This brought him on the peak of its popularity in Flanders. In 1911, he was sworn in, as the candidate of the Antwerp liberal party, as a member of the municipal Council of Antwerp.

In 1915, he was co-founder and president of the Comité voor Hulp en Voeding (E: Committee of help and food) of the province of Antwerp and alderman for the Port of Antwerp. During the German occupation of Belgium in World War I, Franck (under the influence of the Belgian king and the government) acted as the president of a Intercommunale Commissie van Notabelen, the actual head of Antwerp and the neighbouring municipalities. He conducted a careful policy where the language disputes (Dutch versus French) had to rest during the war. He openly condemned the collaboration with the Germans (Activism), and became the personification of the resistance in Flanders.

Although he, in 1916, had said that the fight for the Flemish rights had to be continued after the war, he himself did not get involved with it anymore. After the war he became Minister of Colonies (1918–1924), and on 27 September 1926, he succeeded Fernand Hautain as governor of the National Bank of Belgium and together with Paul van Zeeland, he led this institute for many years in a dynamic but autocratic and self-opinioned way. Gustave Sap attacked the policy of the National Bank in his speech of 16 March 1937 and also the socialist politician Henri de Man attacked him on his policy in 1937. Louis Franck committed suicide at Wijnegem, while a judicial investigation was being conducted.

== See also ==
- Flemish movement
- Lodewijk De Raet

== Sources ==
- Louis Franck (in Dutch)

Preceded by Fernand Hautain	Governor of the National Bank of Belgium; 1926–1937	Succeeded by Georges Janssen
