= Coordinating Committee of Jewish Organizations in Belgium =

Jewish representative organization

The Coordinating Committee of Jewish Organizations in Belgium (also known by its acronym CCOJB) is the key representative organization representing the Jewish Community in Belgium. It is the umbrella organization for a variety of Jewish organizations from different religious, political and social facets of the community. Since September 2016, the organization has been led by Yohan Benizri. The organization is a member of the World Jewish Congress and the European Jewish Congress.

== Foundation ==
The CCOJB was founded in Brussels on 26 March 1969 as the Belgian Section of the World Jewish Congress. The aim of the organization was the "defense, study and development of Jewish values in Belgium and the world". In 1984, the organization changed its name to the Coordinating Committee of Jewish Organizations in Belgium.

== History ==
=== Assassination of Joseph Wybran ===
In December 1988, Joseph Wybran, head of the Immunology department at Erasmus Hospital, became president of the CCOJB. One of the key moments of his presidency surrounded the controversy of the Auschwitz cross, a moment that led to one of the largest crises in Judeo-Christian relations since The Holocaust.

On 3 October 1989, Wybran was leaving the hospital when he was attacked in the parking garage. Struck on the head, he died from his wounds the night of 3–4 October. Quickly the motive was deemed to be antisemitism, with the Abu Nidal Organization and Polish Catholic extremists being the first suspects.

It wasn't until 18 February 2018 that more facts were determined in the case. Due to a hack in Morocco against a terrorist network led by Belgian Moroccan Abdelkader Belliraj, a dossier was on the murder of Wybran surfaced. Since then, Belliraj has confessed to personally killing Wybran. After several delays, a trial for Belliraj and 34 other Islamists began in Rabat on 26 December 2008.

=== Response to Anti-Israel protests ===
Protests in Brussels following the 2008–09 War in Gaza marked a turning point for the organization. Then-president of the CCOJB Maurice Sosnowski said "While some people called for the deaths of Jews, minimizing the Holocaust and presenting Jews as the true masters of the world, what was more shocking to us was not the appearance of Belgian democratic representatives in the crowd but the absence of a political reaction to these anti-Semitic protests of another age. Radical Anti-Zionism is antisemitism because of the calls of hatred of Jews." Affirming that the majority of Belgian Jews supported the idea of a "free, independent, and sovereign Palestine", Sosnowski suggested that a United Nations vote on the Recognition of a Palestinian state does not obscure the fact that Hamas is inspired by the Protocols of the Elders of Zion.

Following a 2011 protest in front of the Israeli Embassy in Brussels, the CCOJB "called on protesters to focus their energies on those who want to see Palestinian and Israeli children grow up with mutual respect and accepting one another's differences."

==== The "Psychodrame Nakba" Affair ====
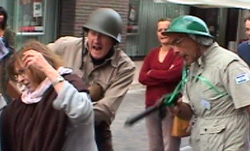
Psychodrame Nakba à Nivelles

On 24 May 2008, pro-Palestinian activists organized a performance theatre piece called "Psychodrame Nakba", meant to commemorate the 60th anniversary of the exodus of 725,000 Palestinian civilians from their homes by Israeli soldiers.

During the demonstration, Belgian MP Thérèse Snoy (Ecolo) denounced the plight of the Palestinians, the inaction of Europe and the "pressure of certain Jewish groups" that operate "at all levels". André Flahaut, Parti Socialiste MP and former Minister of Defence said "I am determined to fight against all forms of extremism, Nazism, Fascism, whenever and wherever they occur. That's why I'm here."

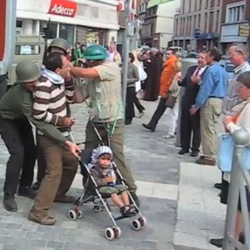
Psychodrame Nakba à Nivelles

The CCOJB filmed the protest and shared the video. Numerous Jewish organizations condemned the protest, including the Israeli Embassy.

Feeling unjustly painted as anti-semitic, Flahaut sued the CCOJB and its president in court. He received one Euro (plus interest) in damages, while the CCOJB and its president aimed to appeal the decision. Snoy declared that she had made "absolutely no antisemitic remarks" and categorically rejected the grave accusation.

A later appeal would definitively rule against Flahaut in his case against the CCOJB and its president Joël Rubinfeld. "The Court recognizes that Andre Flahaut's remarks draw a parallel between Israeli policies and Nazism. On the other hand, neither the CCOJB nor its ex-president accused Flahaut of anti-semitism. In the esteem of the court, they did not violate their freedom of expression." The court ruled that Flahaut had to pay the costs for the proceedings.

In 2011 a similar performance piece took place in downtown Brussels and at Brussels Airport which included the simulated murder of Palestinian children at the hands of actors dressed as Israeli soldiers. This led to criticism of Brussels-Capital Region' s Council, who authorised the event while at the same time banning a Jewish counterprotest "for fear of not being able to ensure its security."

=== Nazi apologists ===
==== The Canvas/Hitler Scandal ====
On 28 October 2008, the Flemish television channel Canvas planned to broadcast an episode of their culinary show Plat préféré on the favorite meal of Adolf Hitler. Many people, organizations and channels were critical of the program putting the former Nazi leader on the same level as Jacques Brel, Salvador Dalí, Maria Callas or Freddie Mercury.

The night before Canvas aired the episode, the CCOJB released a statement denouncing the "indigestible and irresponsible mix of genres that contribute to the banality of a person who symbolizes absolutely evil" and "the shocking lack of sensibility that those who conceived of this episode" and called upon the channel to pull the program. Hours before the show was set to air, Vlaamse Radio- en Televisieomroeporganisatie, the Flemish public broadcasting authority and Canvas' parent company, announced that the episode would be pulled from the air. On 1 December, the VRT made a similar decision to pull an episode of the satirical series Man bijt hond, explaining the cancellation saying the episode followed a "powerful Semite" and mocked the Jewish community's emotional response to "an innocent gas kitchen".

Canvas would find itself in the news a few weeks later, this time for its show Weg met De Soete. For the 27 November 2008 episode involving a guided tour of Berlin, Canvas took out print advertisements in five Flemish newspapers with the show's host Tomas De Soete as a "Chippendale Nazi" with a Hitler mustache and doing a Nazi salute.

Reacting to this new situation, the CCOJB decided to send their dossier to the Centre for Equal Opportunities and Opposition to Racism to have them examine the evidence. In a press release on 25 November 2008 said "the banalization of Nazi iconography used for a visit to the German capital" noting that "the satirical exploitation of Nazi symbols and their irresponsible diversion testify to the distressing degree that our sensibilities and our civic culture can relapse".

After questions from the media, the VRT explained that the advertisement was from a second source and said they would no longer use the illustrations at the center of the controversy. The German Embassy in Brussels released a statement "deploring the inflammatory use of Nazi symbols". This new scandal made its way into Belgian political circles as well, and on 27 November 2008 five Senators from the cdH proposed a law banning the use of Nazi insignia for "propaganda and publicity" purposes.

== Advocacy against antisemitism ==
On February 25, 2026, the CCOJB and the Forum of Jewish Organisations (FJO) issued a joint statement urging the Belgian federal government to appoint an independent national coordinator against antisemitism who would report directly to the Prime Minister, with clear authority, powers, resources and a dedicated budget to develop a national strategy. The organisations stated that the current interfederal coordination mechanism lacks autonomy, a dedicated budget and decision-making power, and meets only twice a year for brief sessions. CCOJB President Yves Oschinsky said it is "unacceptable" that Belgium lacks a visible, active and independent coordinator and described the situation as "ground zero" for the Jewish community.

== Structure ==
The CCOJB is composed of the following organizational committees:

- The Director Committee;
- Administrative Council;
- The General Assembly representing all the organizational members;
- Specific commissions.

=== Presidents ===
- Yves Oschinsky - current
- Yohan Benizri, 2016–?
- Serge Rozen, 2015–2016
- Maurice Sosnowski, 2010–2015
- Joël Rubinfeld, 2007–2010
- Philippe Markiewicz, 2001–2007
- Viviane Teitelbaum, 1998–2001
- Julien Rybski, 1996–1998
- David Susskind, 1993–1996
- Lazard Perez, 1989–1993
- Joseph Wybran, 1988–1989
- Markus Pardes, 1986–1988
- André Gantman, 1984–1986
- David Susskind, 1974 – 1984
- Alexis Goldschmidt, 1969–1974
