= Herman De Croo =

Belgian politician (born 1937)

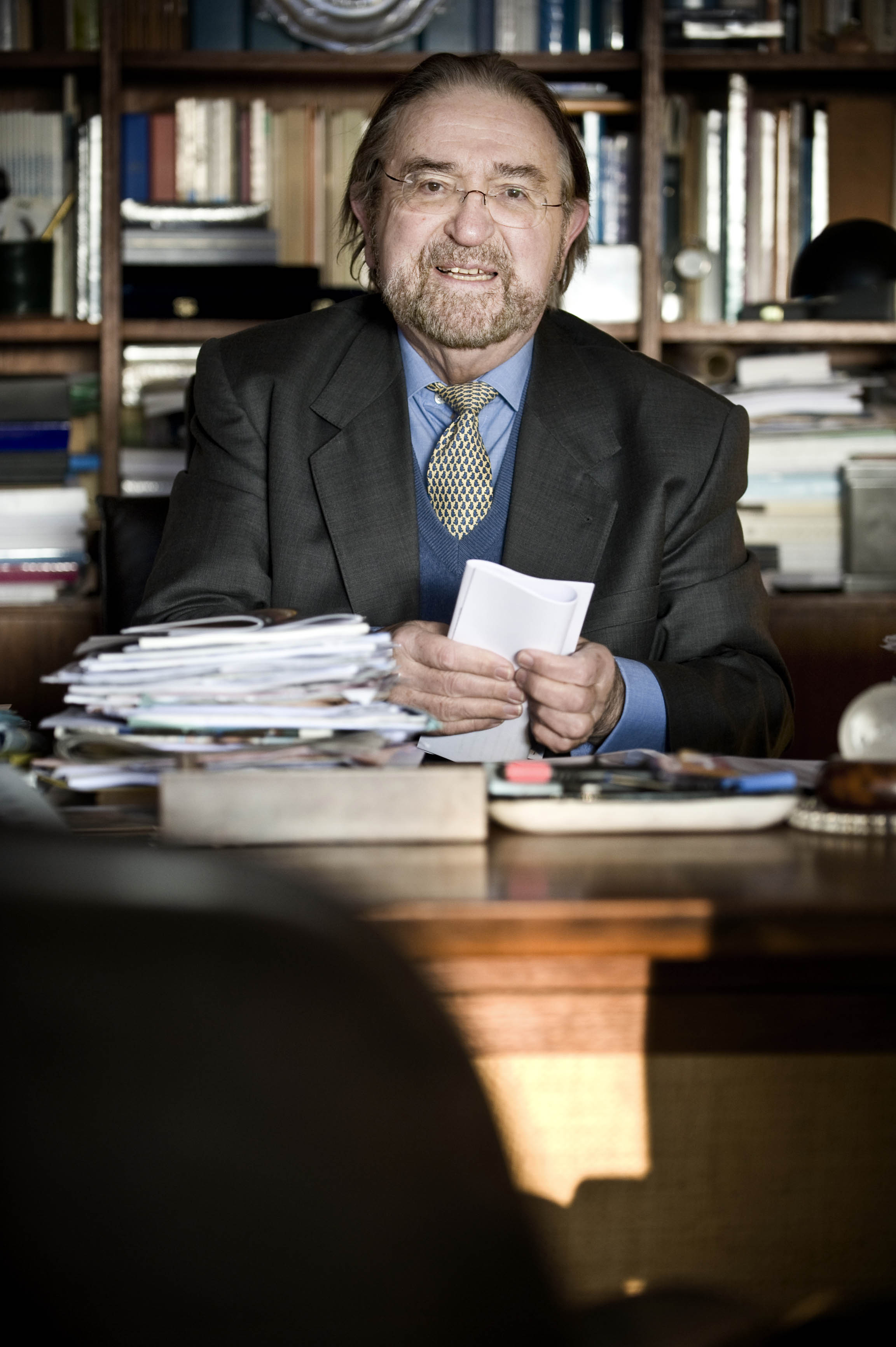
- De Croo, 2009

President of the Chamber of Representatives
- In office 1 July 1999 – 12 July 2007
- Preceded by: Raymond Langendries
- Succeeded by: Herman Van Rompuy

Member of the Chamber of Representatives
- In office 8 June 1995 – 28 April 2014
- In office 31 March 1968 – 15 December 1991

Senator of Belgium
- In office 16 December 1991 – 7 June 1995

Personal details
- Born: Herman Francies Joseph De Croo; 12 August 1937 (age 89) Brakel, Belgium
- Party: Anders
- Spouse: Françoise Desguin
- Children: 2, including Alexander
- Education: Université libre de Bruxelles (BA, JD); University of Chicago (FP)

Herman Francies Joseph De Croo (born 12 August 1937) is a Belgian politician of Anders (formerly Open Flemish Liberals and Democrats). First elected in March 1968, he is the longest serving Belgian member of parliament, serving uninterrupted until 2014. He is the father of former prime minister Alexander De Croo.

He went to school at Collège Saint-Stanislas in Mons. He obtained a doctorate in law from the Université libre de Bruxelles in 1961, and later attended the University of Chicago Law School on a Fulbright Scholarship.

From 1999 until July 2007, De Croo was the President of the Chamber of Representatives, the lower house of the country's Federal Parliament. He is the current mayor of Brakel.

De Croo was first elected to the Chamber of Representatives in 1968 for the PVV-PLP. He has since served in various governments as minister of Transport and Foreign Trade; minister of Transport, Postal Services, Telegraphy and Telephony; minister of Education and minister of Postal Services, Telegraphy, Telephony and Pensions.

Herman De Croo, who holds a Ph.D. in law, is a former Professor of Common Law at the Vrije Universiteit Brussel.

De Croo has been President of the European Transport Safety Council since it was founded in 1993.

== Honours ==
- Minister of State since 3 June 1998.
- Poland: 1st class - Grand Cross of the Order of Merit of the Republic of Poland.

== Bibliography ==
- Parlement et Gouvernement (1965)
- Het Parlement aan het werk, de taak van de hedendaagse vertegenwoordiging" (1966)
- België/Belgique : Service Nation (1985 and 1988)
- De wereld volgens Herman De Croo (1999)

Political offices
Preceded by Raymond Langendries	President of the Chamber of Representatives; 1999–2007	Succeeded by Herman Van Rompuy
