= Étienne Constantin de Gerlache =

First Prime Minister of Belgium

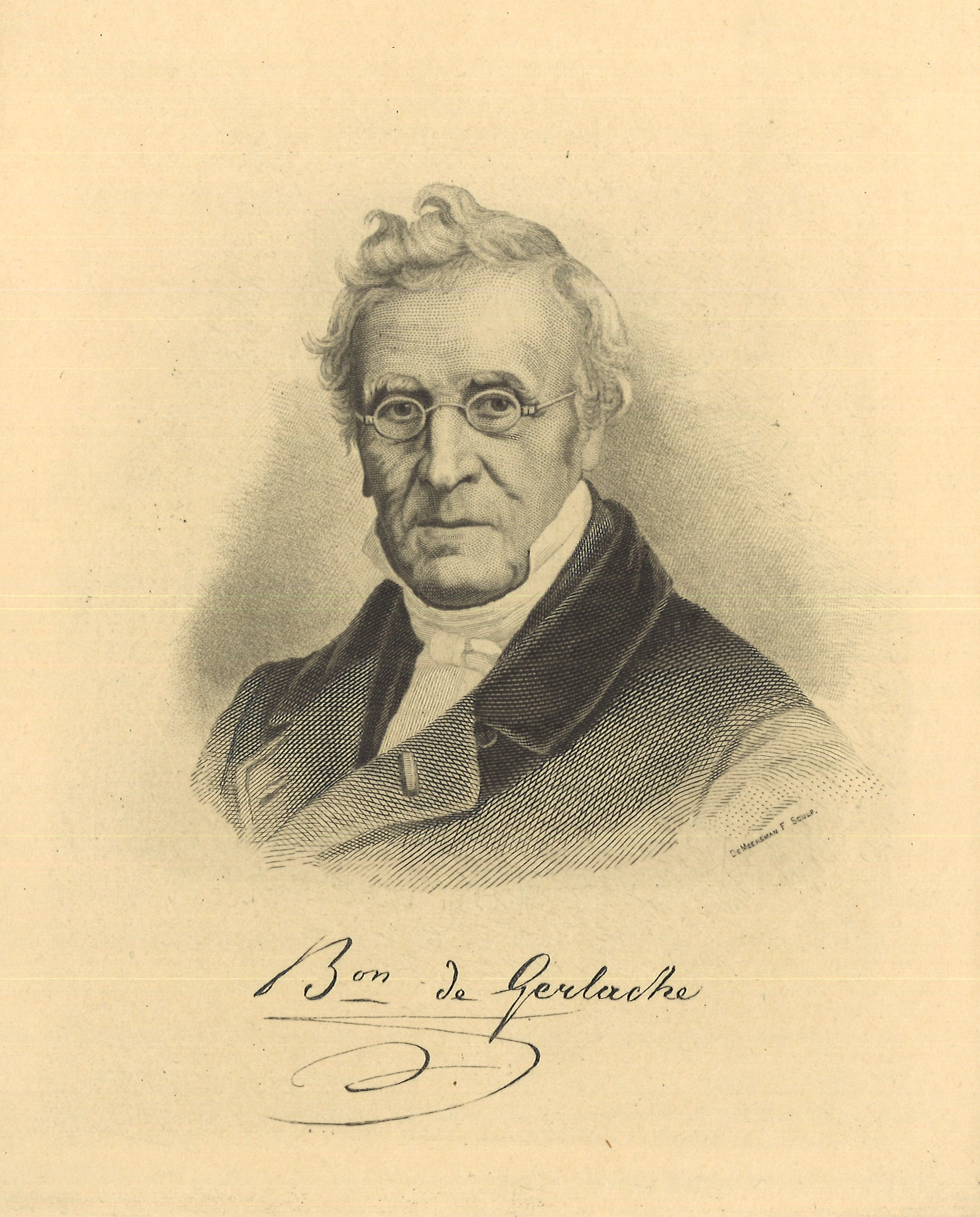
- Portrait of de Gerlache, 1906

Prime Minister of Belgium
- In office 27 February 1831 – 28 March 1831
- Monarch: Erasme Louis Surlet de Chokier (Regent)
- Preceded by: Position established
- Succeeded by: Joseph Lebeau

President of the Chamber of Representatives
- In office 10 September 1831 – 15 November 1832
- Preceded by: Position established
- Succeeded by: Jean-Joseph Raikem

Personal details
- Born: 26 December 1785; Bertrix, Austrian Netherlands (now Belgium)
- Died: 10 February 1871 (aged 85); Ixelles, Belgium
- Political party: Catholic Party
- Spouse: Anne Buschmann
- Children: 5

Étienne Constantin, Baron de Gerlache (French pronunciation: [etjɛn kɔ̃stɑ̃tɛ̃ baʁɔ̃ də ʒɛʁlaʃ]; 26 December 1785 – 10 February 1871) was a lawyer and politician in the United Kingdom of the Netherlands, and later became in 1831 the first prime minister of the newly founded Belgian state.

He was born as son of Francois de Gerlache and Margarethe de Groulart. He studied law in Paris and practised there for some time, but settled at Liège after the establishment of the kingdom of the Netherlands. As member of the states-general he was an energetic member of the opposition, and, though he repudiated an ultramontane policy, he supported the alliance of the extreme Catholics with the Liberal party, which paved the way for the revolution of 1830.

On the outbreak of disturbance in August 1830 he still, however, thought the Orange-Nassau dynasty and the union with the Dutch states essential; but his views changed, and, after holding various offices in the provisional government, he became president of congress, and brought forward the motion inviting Leopold of Saxe-Coburg to become king of the Belgians. In 1832 he was president of the chamber of representatives, and for thirty-five years he presided over the court of appeal. He presided over the Catholic congresses held at Mechelen between 1863 and 1867. That his early Liberal views underwent some modification is plain from the Conservative principles enunciated in his Essai sur le mouvement des partis en Belgique (Brussels, 1852). As a historian his work was strongly colored by his anti-Dutch prejudices and his Catholic predilections. His Histoire des Pays-Bas depuis 1814 jusquen 1830 (Brussels, 2 vols., 1839), which reached a fourth edition in 1875, was a piece of special pleading against the Dutch domination. The most important of his other works were his Histoire de Liège (Brussels, 1843) and his Études sur Salluste et sur quelques-uns des principaux historiens de l'antiquité (Brussels, 1847).

In 1831, he was elected in Liège for the Belgian Chamber of Representatives, of which he was president until 1832. Later on, he became the first 1st president of the Belgian Court of Cassation, a position he occupied until 1867. He died on 10 February 1871 in Ixelles.

== Honours ==
- Belgium: Grand Cordon of the Order of Leopold (Belgium).
- Belgium: War Cross (Belgium).
- France: Officer of the Legion of Honour.
- Knight of the Order of Saint Gregory the Great.

Political offices
Preceded by Charles Rogier; Acting	Prime Minister of Belgium; 1831	Succeeded by Joseph Lebeau
New office	President of the Chamber of Representatives; 1831–1832	Succeeded by Jean-Joseph Raikem
New office	1st President of the Court of Cassation; 1832–1867	Succeeded by Eugène Defacqz
