= Érasme-Louis Surlet de Chokier =

Belgian politician and regent (1769–1839)

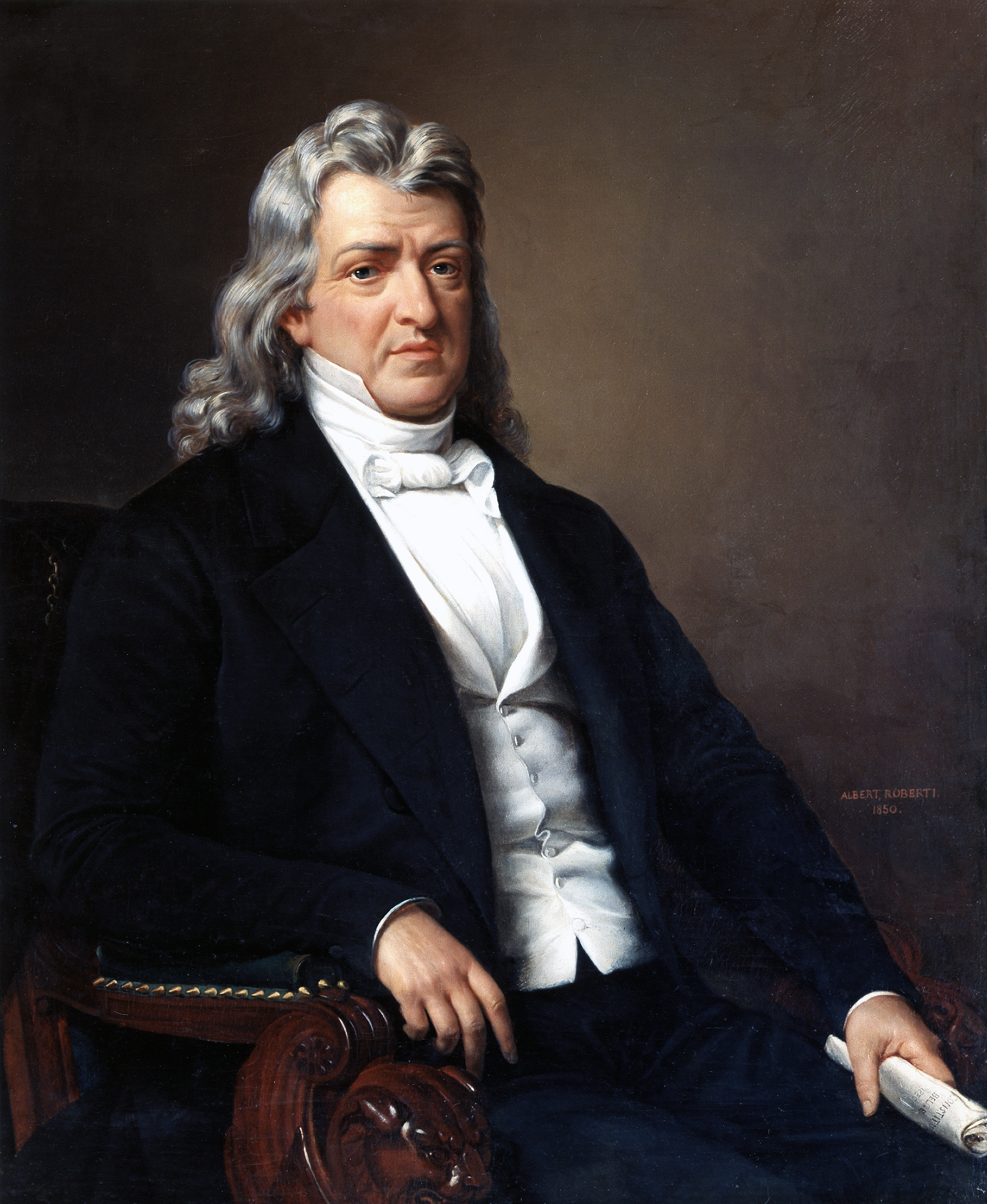

Regent of Belgium
- In office 25 February 1831 – 21 July 1831
- Prime Minister: Étienne de Gerlache; Joseph Lebeau
- Succeeded by: Leopold I (as King of the Belgians)

Personal details
- Born: 27 November 1769 City of Liège, Liège
- Died: 7 August 1839 (aged 69) Gingelom, Belgium

Érasme-Louis Surlet de Chokier (French pronunciation: [eʁasm lwi syʁlɛ də ʃɔkje]; 27 November 1769 – 7 August 1839) was a Belgian politician who served as the first Regent of Belgium from 24 February 1831 until 21 July 1831, prior to the accession of Leopold I of Belgium.

== Early life and the Liège Revolution ==
Born in Liège, Surlet de Chokier participated in the Liège Revolution of 1789, which followed the broader revolutionary movements then unfolding in Europe. During the uprising against Prince-Bishop César-Constantin-François de Hoensbroeck, he served in the patriotic forces. After the defeat of revolutionary troops by Austrian forces in 1790, he temporarily went into exile before returning to his estate at Gingelom in 1792.

== French and Napoleonic period ==
Following the annexation of the region by Revolutionary France, Surlet de Chokier entered public service under the French administration. In 1800 he was appointed mayor of Gingelom and later became a member of the departmental council of Meuse-Inférieure. In 1812 he served as a member of the French legislative body.

== United Kingdom of the Netherlands ==
After the defeat of Napoleon and the creation of the United Kingdom of the Netherlands in 1815, Surlet de Chokier became a member of the House of Representatives of the Staten-Generaal, where he emerged as a leading figure among representatives from the southern provinces. His opposition to the policies of William I of the Netherlands earned him the nickname "Surlet de Choquant." Although he was created a baron in 1816, he was not re-elected in 1828.

== Belgian Revolution and Regency ==
Following the outbreak of the Belgian Revolution, Surlet de Chokier was elected as a deputy to the National Congress of Belgium representing the Arrondissement of Hasselt. He was subsequently chosen as chairman of the Congress and participated in the drafting of the Belgian Constitution. After Prince Louis, Duke of Nemours declined the Belgian crown, the National Congress appointed Surlet de Chokier as Regent of Belgium on 24 February 1831. He exercised the functions of head of state until Leopold I formally took the constitutional oath as King of the Belgians on 21 July 1831.

== Death ==
Surlet de Chokier died on 7 August 1839 in Gingelom.

== Heraldry ==
Coat of arms of the Surlet de Chokier family
| Escutcheon Or, a saltire gules |

Political offices
| New title | Regent of Belgium; 25 February 1831 – 21 July 1831 | Succeeded by Leopold I as King of the Belgians |
