= Yves Kreins =

Belgian public official

Yves Kreins (born 18 June 1952), a native of Sankt Vith, has been from 2014 to 2017 the First President of the Belgian Council of State, which is the highest administrative court in the kingdom, with fourteen Chamber Presidents.

Kreins was appointed to the Council of State as a councillor in 1991. In 2014 he was appointed First President, in succession to Robert Andersen. He was sworn in on 20 January 2014 for a term ending 30 April 2017.

Since 1997 he has been lector of the Faculty of Law at the University of Liège. From 2000 to 2013 he was Secretary General of ACA Europe, the Association of Councils of State and Supreme Administrative Jurisdictions of the European Union.

== Honours ==
- 2015: Knight Grand Cross of the Order of the Crown.

== Publications ==
- Jacques Brassinne and Yves Kreins, "La réforme de l'état et la communauté germanophone", Courrier Hebdomadaire CRISP (Centre du Recherche et d'lnformation Socio-Politiques), 1028-9 (1984).

Legal offices
Preceded by Robert Andersen	First President of the Council of State; 2014–2017	Succeeded by Roger Stevens
