= National Congress of Belgium =

Governing legislative body of Belgium from 1830 to 1831

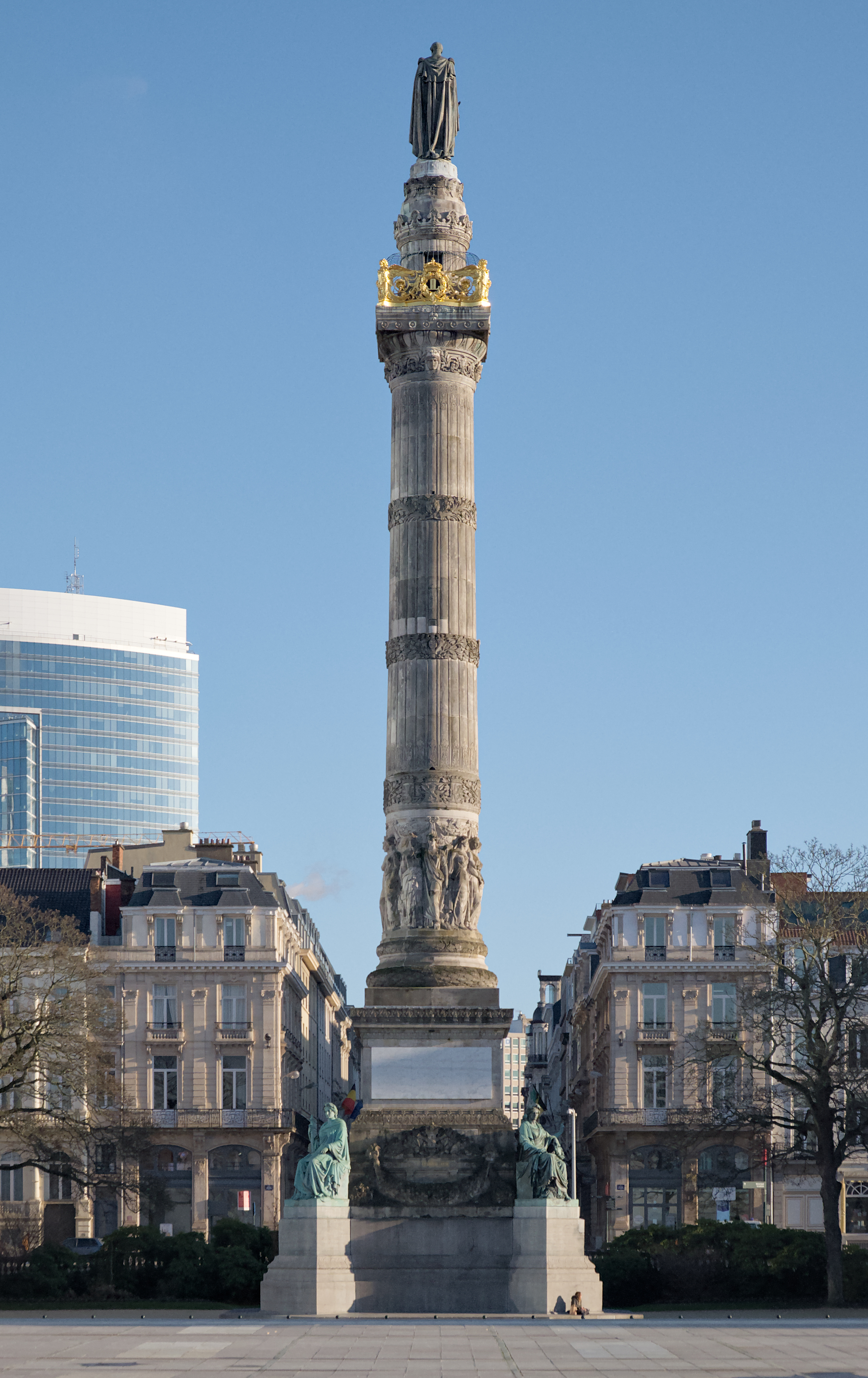
The Congress Column in Brussels

The National Congress (French: Congrès national, Dutch: Nationaal Congres) was a temporary legislative assembly in Belgium, convened in 1830 in the aftermath of the Belgian Revolution. Its purpose was to devise a national constitution for the new state, whose independence had been proclaimed on 4 October 1830 by the self-declared Provisional Government.

== History ==
The National Congress was elected by approximately 30,000 voters on 3 November 1830 and consisted of 200 members. Its president was Baron Erasme Louis Surlet de Chokier.

The assembly chose a constitutional popular monarchy as the form of government for Belgium and chose the son of the French King Louis-Philippe, Louis, Duke of Nemours, as the new head of state. Other candidates included Auguste de Beauharnais and Archduke Charles of Austria, younger brother of Francis II, Holy Roman Emperor and the last Governor-General of the Austrian Netherlands. The choice of Louis of Nemours, was unacceptable to the government of the United Kingdom and another candidate had to be found. Surlet de Chokier was appointed Regent while awaiting a new decision and was replaced as president of the National Congress by Etienne Constantin, Baron de Gerlache. Leopold of Saxe-Coburg and Gotha was definitively chosen to become the first King of the Belgians. The National Congress appointed him king on 4 June and six weeks later he was sworn in by swearing allegiance to the Belgian Constitution in front of the Church of St. James on Coudenberg in Brussels. This day (21 July) has since been Belgian National Day.

The Constitution of 1831, which was very progressive for its time, was accepted on 7 February 1831. The Provisional Government was subsequently dismantled. The National Congress itself remained in place until the official elections of a first Parliament on 29 August 1831. A monument in Brussels, the Congress Column, was erected in its honour. On the base of the Congress Column, there are four allegorical bronze female sculptures that represent the four constitutional liberties enshrined in the Constitution of 1831: Freedom of the Press, Worship, Association and Education. These four constitutional liberties are also reflected in the streets of Brussels, especially in the Freedom Quarter. There are four streets that lead to the Place de la Liberté/Vrijheidsplein ("Liberty Square"): the Rue des Cultes/Eredienststraat ("Worship Street"), the Rue de l'Association/Verenigingsstraat ("Association Street"), the Rue de l'Enseignement/Onderrichtstraat ("Education Street") and the Rue de la Presse/Drukpersstraat ("Press Street").

== See also ==
- Constituent Assembly of Luxembourg, a similar constituent assembly in Luxembourg in 1848
