= Jean-François Tielemans =

Belgian lawyer and liberal politician

Jean–François Tielemans
- Born: 15 November 1799; Brussels, French First Republic
- Died: 5 July 1887 (aged 87); Elsene, Belgium
- Occupations: politician, lawyer

Jean–François Tielemans (15 November 1799 – 5 July 1887) was a Belgian lawyer and liberal politician. He was interim governor of the province of Antwerp from 7 April 1831 until 14 June 1831 and governor of Liège Province from 4 June 1831 until 4 October 1832.

== Life ==
=== To 1830 ===
Tielemans' parents belonged to the mercantile middle class in Brussels. He finished secondary school in Brussels then studied law at the University of Liège. For his doctorate in 1823 he produced a thesis entitled De jure et natura legitimae secundum jus civile et hodiernum (Luik, Collardin, 1823). He joined the bar in Brussels and was also active as a journalist, especially for the Journal de Gand.

In 1827 he was commissioned by the Minister of Education in Germany and Austria to study the relationship between Roman Catholic Church and Protestant authorities. He stayed in Vienna and Berlin in 1828 before returning to Brussels, where he was made a secretary in the Ministry of Foreign Affairs. In October 1829 he was transferred to The Hague. However, if the government had hoped that these appointments would win Tielemans over to their side, they were mistaken. Tielemans befriended Louis De Potter and increasingly became an opponent of the government, writing articles for Le Belge and Le Courrier des Pays-Bas.

In 1827 he published one statement about the press and another in favour of the printer Weissenbruch, arguing that a printer could not be prosecuted if the author of an article was known. In 1829 he published a Brief aan Van Maanen (Letter to Van Maanen) who had responsibility for the ministry (Brussel, Coché-Mommens, 1829). This brochure went down badly with the Minister of Justice and the ministry began to put Tielemans' correspondence with De Potter under surveillance. On 15 February 1830 Tielemans was arrested and imprisoned in Brussels. Tielemans, De Potter and Adolphe Bartels then had to appear before the court of assizes to answer to charges of inciting revolt against the government. Tielemans was sentenced to seven years' exile and went to live in Paris, where he formed a committee to help Belgian political refugees. He was a founding member of the first Société des douze.

=== Belgian Revolution ===
On receiving a letter informing him of the Belgian Revolution, he returned to Brussels and on 6 October 1830 the Provisional Government appointed him a member of the Constitutional Committee and Administrator-General (effectively minister) of the Interior. He was very busy in the second of these roles - he had to organise the administration, national, provincial and municipal elections, schools, public works and measures regarding trade, agriculture and industry, among others. In the sitting of the National Congress of Belgium on 9 December 1830 he released a report reflecting the difficulties he had encountered and the seriousness and complexity of the situation as it had materialized.

Tielemans belonged to the small minority of liberal republicans who preferred unionist cabinets. He was the only member of the Constitutional Committee in favour of a republic, whilst all the others favoured a constitutional monarchy. From 26 February to 23 March 1831 he was minister of the interior in the first cabinet under regent Erasme Louis Surlet de Chokier, but he was dismissed after only one month.

Next, on 4 June 1831, he was made governor of Liège Province, holding it until 4 October 1832, when he was appointed advocate-general to the court of appeal by the conservative minister of the interior Barthélémy de Theux de Meylandt, who wished to replace Tielemans as governor with a Catholic. However, the minimum age for a senior member of the judiciary was 35 (Tielemans was then 33), so this was a veiled demotion rather than a promotion. Minister of Justice Joseph Raikem alleged this had been a mistake, but in the meantime a new governor of Liège had been appointed so Tielemans could not return to this post. This left him nothing but to return to his legal practice, this time at the Liège bar (during his governorship he had in 1832 stood as a candidate in the legislative elections, but his opponent won a few votes more and was elected). This did not last long, since on 9 October 1834 he met the age requirement and was made a judge at the court of appeal in Brussels. In 1859 he became Chairman of the Chamber in 1867 and first President, until his retirement in 1871.

He was also co-founder and was professor of administrative law at the Vrije Universiteit Brussel, where he was also rector (1849–1861). He spent 33 years teaching. In 1834 he and Charles de Brouckere founded the Répertoire de l'administration et du droit administratif de Belgique in twenty volumes. In 1865 he received the Annual Prize for the Five Moral and Political Sciences. In 1847–48 he was also a member of parliament, but had to leave due to the law on incompatibility. From 1855 to 1877 he was also a councilor of Brussels. He was made a corresponding member of the Koninklijke Academie in 1875, full member in 1878 and director in 1887.

== Works ==
Tielemans had several legal and political texts published in the form of brochures, such as:

- L’Union et la Constitution, réponse à un anonyme, Luik, Jeunehomme, 1832 p.
- De la charité publique, Brussel, Weissenbruch, 1855.
- De la propriété industrielle (Rev. Trim., vol. III, 1854, p. 5)
- Avant-projet de loi sur les cours d'eau non-navigables ni flottables, rapport de la commission extraparlementaire, Brussel, Seghers, 1857
- Etude sur le legs de M. Verhaegen, Brussel, Weissenbruh, 1863
- L’acceptation des dons ou legs faits aux fabriques d'église doit-elle être l'objet d'une délibération du conseil de fabrique, ou suffit-il d'une délibération du bureau des marguilliers? (Revue communale, vol. III, 1870, p. 20.)

== Sources ==
- Steve Heylen, Bart De Nil, Bart D’hondt, Sophie Gyselinck, Hanne Van Herck en Donald Weber, Geschiedenis van de provincie Antwerpen. Een politieke biografie, Antwerpen, Provinciebestuur Antwerpen, 2005, Vol. 2 p. 175
- Armand Freson, Jean-François Tielemans, in: Biographie nationale de Belgique, t. XXV, 1930–1932, col. 246-250
- Jean-Pierre Nandrin, L'acte de fondation des nominations politiques de la magistrature. La Cour de Cassation à l'aube de l'indépendance belge, in: Belgisch Tijdschrift voor Nieuwste Geschiedenis, 1998, blz. 153-202.

Preceded by New creation	Minister of the Interior; 1831	Succeeded by Etienne de Sauvage
Preceded by François de Robiano	Governor of Antwerp (interim); 1831 – 1832	Succeeded by Charles Rogier
Preceded by Etienne de Sauvage	Governor of Liège Province; 1831-1832	Succeeded by Charles van den Steen de Jehay
