= Non-juror =

A non-juror is a person who refuses to swear a particular oath:

- In British history, non-jurors refused to swear allegiance to William and Mary and their heirs or abjure the Stuarts; see Nonjuring schism
- In French history, non-jurors or Refractory clergy were clergy members who refused to swear an oath of allegiance to the state under the Civil Constitution of the Clergy; also known as refractory clergy, priests and bishops
- In American history, non-jurors were citizens of the Thirteen Colonies who declined both to fight as Loyalists and to swear the Oath of Allegiance to the rebel state governments
