= Scipione de' Ricci =

Italian Catholic cleric

Most Reverend Scipione de' Ricci
- Bishop of Pistoia e Prato
- Engraved portrait of Scipione de' Ricci by Matilde Malenchini
- Church: Catholic Church
- Diocese: Diocese of Pistoia
- In office: 1780–1791
- Predecessor: Giuseppe Ippoliti
- Successor: Francesco Falchi Picchinesi

Orders
- Ordination: 20 September 1766
- Consecration: 25 June 1780 by Andrea Corsini

Personal details
- Born: 19 January 1741 Florence, Grand Duchy of Tuscany
- Died: 27 January 1810 (aged 69) Greve in Chianti, First French Empire

Scipione de' Ricci (19 January 1741 – 27 January 1810) was an Italian Catholic prelate, who was bishop of Pistoia from 1780 to 1791. He was sympathetic to Jansenist ideas in theology.

== Biography ==
Scipione de' Ricci was born in Florence, of a notable local family. On June 19, 1780, he was appointed Bishop of Pistoia and Prato, the most populous of the dioceses of Tuscany. As bishop, he acted with energy in his government of the diocese and cited the measures of Pius VI in favour of pastoral renewal.

The absolutist monarchy of the Grand Duchy of Tuscany was in the hands of the Habsburg dynasty, which in Austria had already made its own the ecclesiastical policies expounded by the German Febronius, of fundamentally Gallican tendency.

With the support of Leopold I, Grand Duke of Tuscany, or perhaps at the latter's instigation, Ricci summoned the 1786 Synod of Pistoia, whose members, drawn from the local clergy, voted with the encouragement of the bishop and the absolutist regime for a heady list of propositions of mixed provenance. Some came simply from Febronianism, others from Gallicanism, others from Jansenism. Among the measures voted were some that simply dealt with public order issues connected with saints' festivals, some repeated regulations that had been part of Church law for centuries. Others concerned matters of Church doctrine well beyond the authority of a single diocese, others were moderate pastoral proposals. A number were hoary old chestnuts of Church reform, such as the censoring of "legendary" material in service-books, an issue proposed to the Council of Trent and dealt with the liturgical reforms initiated by Pope Pius V and his successors.

The synod's decrees, promulgated by means of a pastoral letter of the bishop, met naturally with warm approval from the Grand Duke. The next phase in the latter's programme was a "national" synod of the Tuscan bishops, which duly met at Florence on April 23, 1787. At this point, however, the plan stalled. The bishops who made up its participants refused to allow a voice to any not of their own order, and in the end the decrees of Pistoia were supported by only three bishops.

Nevertheless, the acts of the synod of Pistoia were published in Latin and Italian at Pavia in 1788.

Despite having been cited by Ricci as the inspirer of his moves, Pope Pius VI intervened and had the Pistoia resolutions examined. A series of extracted propositions were eventually condemned by the papal bull Auctorem fidei of August 28, 1794. Deprived of the personal support of the Grand Duke (who had in the meantime become Holy Roman Emperor Leopold II), under pressure from Rome, and threatened with mob violence as a suspected destroyer of holy relics, Ricci had already resigned his see in 1791, and lived in Florence as a private gentleman until his death. In May 1805, upon the return of Pope Pius VII from Paris, he signed an act of submission to papal authority. He died on 28 December 1810, and is buried at Rignana, near Greve in Chianti.

== Memoirs ==
De' Ricci's own memoirs, Memorie di Scipione de' Ricci, vescovo di Prato e Pistoia, edited by Antonio Galli, were published at Florence in two volumes in 1865. Besides this, his letters to Antonio Marini were published by Cesare Guasti at Prato in 1857; these were promptly put on the Index. See also Louis de Potter, Vie de Scipion de Ricci (2 vols., Brussels, 1825), based on a manuscript life and a manuscript account of the synod placed on the Index in 1823. There are many documents in Antonio Zobi, Storia civile della Toscana, vols. ii. and iii. (Florence, 1856).

Portions of his memoirs were selectively published as an anti-Roman Catholic tract, edited in 1829 by Thomas Roscoe (with translation by De Potter) under the title of Female Convents: Secrets of Nunneries Disclosed.
