= Refractory clergy =

French priests refusing loyalty to the Civil Constitution of the Clergy

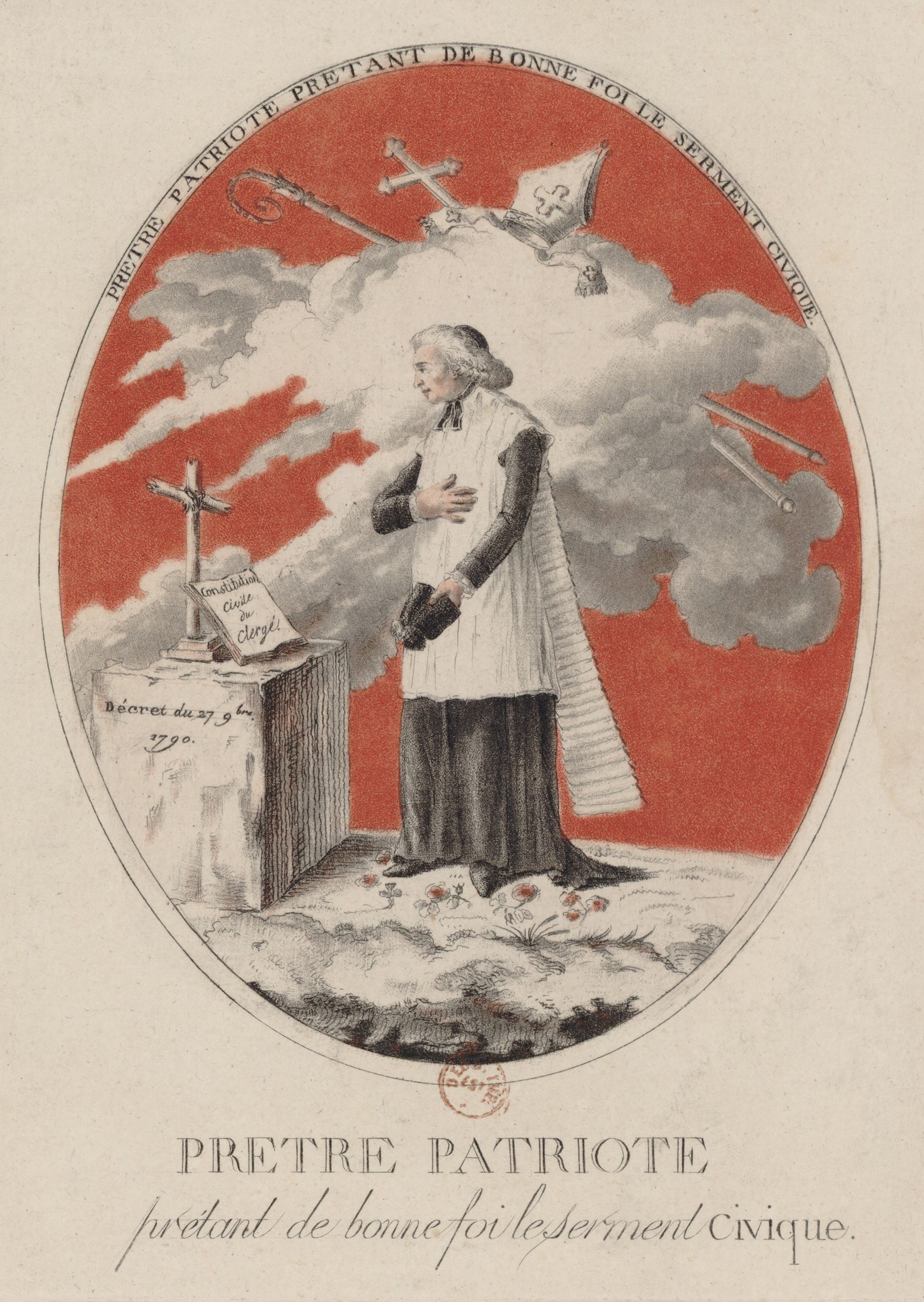
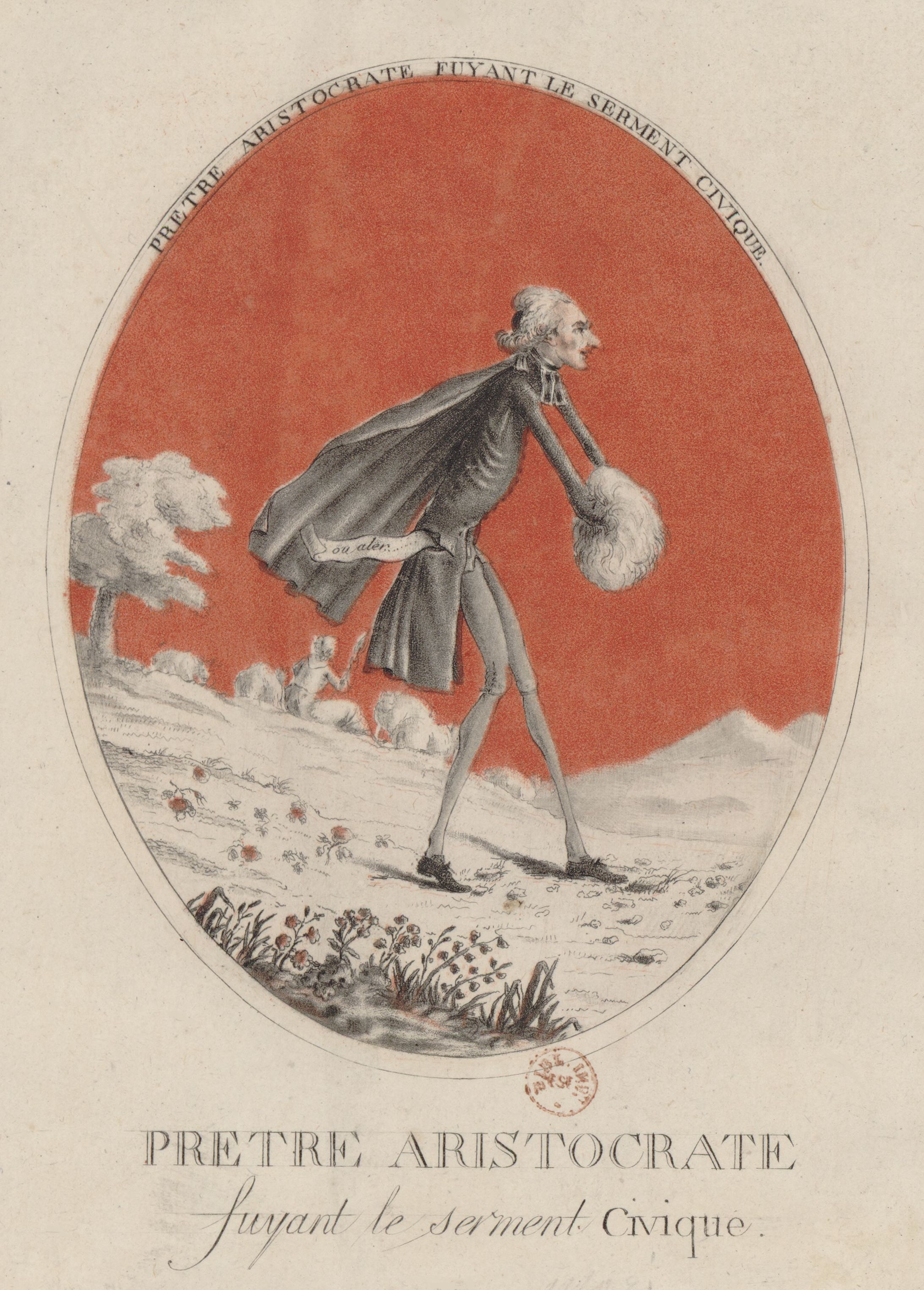
Prints opposing the "patriotic priest taking the civic oath in good faith" to the "aristocratic priest" fleeing the same oath (1790)

During the French Revolution, the National Assembly abolished the traditional structure of the Catholic Church in France and reorganized it as an institution within the structure of the new French government through the Civil Constitution of the Clergy. One of the new requirements placed upon all clergy was the necessity of an oath of loyalty to the State before all foreign influences such as the Pope. This created a schism within the French clergy, with those taking the oath known as juring priests, and those refusing the oath known as non-juring clergy or refractory clergy.

== Background ==
In the centuries preceding the French Revolution, the Church had functioned as an autonomous entity within France. It controlled roughly 10% of all French land, levied mandatory tithes upon the populace, and collected revenues from its estates, all of which contributed to the Church's total income, which it was not obliged to disclose to the state.

Under the ancien regime, France was divided into three Estates, and the clergy occupied the First Estate, with the aristocracy comprising the Second Estate, and the commoners the Third Estate. As one of the first two privileged Estates, the Church was exempt from taxation, although every five years the Assembly of the Clergy met and arranged a don gratuit (free gift) to be given to the King on behalf of the Church.

Over the course of the 18th century, France fell into deeper and deeper financial crisis. On multiple occasions, the state attempted to revoke the Church's tax-free status in order to tap into its significant financial resources, with official declarations calling for formal surveys of the Church's wealth and subsequent taxations being levied in 1749 and 1780. Both were successfully rebuffed by the Church, whose infrastructure, organization, man-power, and influence were still powerful in France. Nonetheless, these events show that a desire to check the power and privileges of the Church was gaining momentum before the Revolution erupted.

== During the French Revolution ==
In an attempt to find a peaceful resolution to mounting popular unrest and calls for reform, King Louis XVI first convened the Assembly of Notables in 1787 and then revived the Estates-General in 1789. During the 1787 Assembly, clerical representatives strongly opposed any reforms directed towards the Church, but by the meeting of the Estates-General, internal divisions began to form. Bishops and other ‘high clergy’ (who were often of noble stock) generally allied with the Second Estate in the preservation of their traditional privileges. However, many parish priests and other ‘low clergy’ sided with the Third Estate, representing their own class and the class of their flocks.

Things began to change quickly in 1789. On August 4, the newly assembled National Assembly drafted the ‘Declaration of the Rights of Man and of the Citizen,’ and over the next year completely dismantled French society and began to rebuild it from the ground up. Part of this included confiscating Church property and transferring ownership to the state. By June 1790 the Assembly had officially abolished the nobility, and on July 12 passed the Civil Constitution of the Clergy.

=== Civil Constitution of the Clergy ===
This new legislation dismantled and restructured the Church along the same lines as with the rest of society. Bishoprics were realigned to correspond with the eighty-three departments France had been divided into, and any additional bishoprics were abolished. Clergy were forbidden from recognizing the authority of any Church officials beholden to a foreign power. This included the Pope, whose position they were allowed to acknowledge, but not his authority. New bishops were forbidden from seeking confirmation from the Pope, but were allowed to write him to inform him of their position and reassert a unity of faith.

The most contentious aspect of the constitution, however, involved how new bishops were to be appointed to office and the duties required of them. The Church was in essence incorporated as another branch of the state. With bishops to be elected by popular vote. This was received with outrage by many clergy, as it not only completely up-ended the traditional appointment system of the Church, but would furthermore allow Protestants, Jews, and atheists to directly influence Church matters. Perhaps the greatest problem though, was Article XXI of Title II. This required a bishop to take an oath before municipal officials promising "to be loyal to the nation, the law, and the king, and to support with all his power the constitution". Failing this their office would be declared vacant.

Sentiments between the Church and the Revolution began to sour much faster after this. While "reform" had been the stated goal by revolutionaries before, anti-religious rhetoric calling for the abolishment of the Church as a whole began to gain prominence. In October 1790, the National Convention banned priests, monks, nuns, and any who had previously occupied such positions from teaching in schools, and many members of the convention began calling for a “religion of patriotism” to supplant Catholic Christianity entirely. In November, the oath described in the Civil Constitution of the Clergy was drafted, and by the end of the year the Assembly proclaimed executive authority to enforce said oath.

=== Refractory clergy ===
Percentage of priests in each department of Mainland France swearing the Civic Oath in 1791. (Departmental boundaries shown are as of date map created in 2007)

The oath of loyalty created a massive schism within the French clergy. Many lower clergy had initially supported revolutionary calls for reform, even within the Church; but even among them, a large number thought that this was beyond the pale. Thousands of priests, monks, and nuns believed that taking the oath meant risking their salvation; yet they had to choose between that and the danger of arrest and punishment. On 13 April 1791, the Pope forced the issue by issuing the papal encyclical Charitas, officially condemning the Revolution's actions towards the Church and leveling excommunication upon any clergy who took the oath.

The clergy split into juring priests (those who took the oath) and non-juring or refractory priests (those who refused). Both factions could face persecution, as communities with strong revolutionary sentiments would beat, stone, or even kill non-juring priests, while in more religiously traditional communities juring priests could face similar assaults.

This controversy was the first major issue to divide the popular masses on revolutionary reforms. Never had royalists or other counter-revolutionaries had popular constituencies, but there were many who believed the state had no right to meddle in the affairs of God to this degree and were loyal to their local priests. Also, sectors of France that had long-standing conflict with Protestant communities refused to support anything that threatened Catholic doctrine. Many clergy who were previously supportive of the Revolution were driven into opposition, and thousands of clergy hid or fled the country entirely.

=== Impact ===
While there were organized efforts to hunt down refractory priests and organized protests of religious ceremonies, many revolutionary leaders began to see this as detrimental to the movement. Some were vehemently ethically opposed, such as Maximilien Robespierre, who argued that atheism was a dangerous product of aristocratic decadence, and believed that a moral society should at least acknowledge the provenance of a Supreme Being. Others had more practical objections, knowing that deep-seated religious beliefs would not be eliminated quickly, and that mobilizing popular support for the Revolution was of top importance. Dividing and alienating the masses over religious issues was unhelpful.

Throughout all this, Louis XVI was appalled. Louis was a devout man, and while he was required to give public approval to the Civil Constitution of the Clergy, in private he rejected it. On Palm Sunday in April 1791, he took communion from a non-juring priest. While friends, advisors, and even his wife had been strongly urging him to flee the country, Louis had resisted these suggestions. The attack on the clergy was potentially the tipping point that eventually led to the King's doomed flight to Varennes in June 1791.

== Related articles ==
- Jureur
