= Louis de Potter =

Belgian journalist, revolutionary, politician and writer

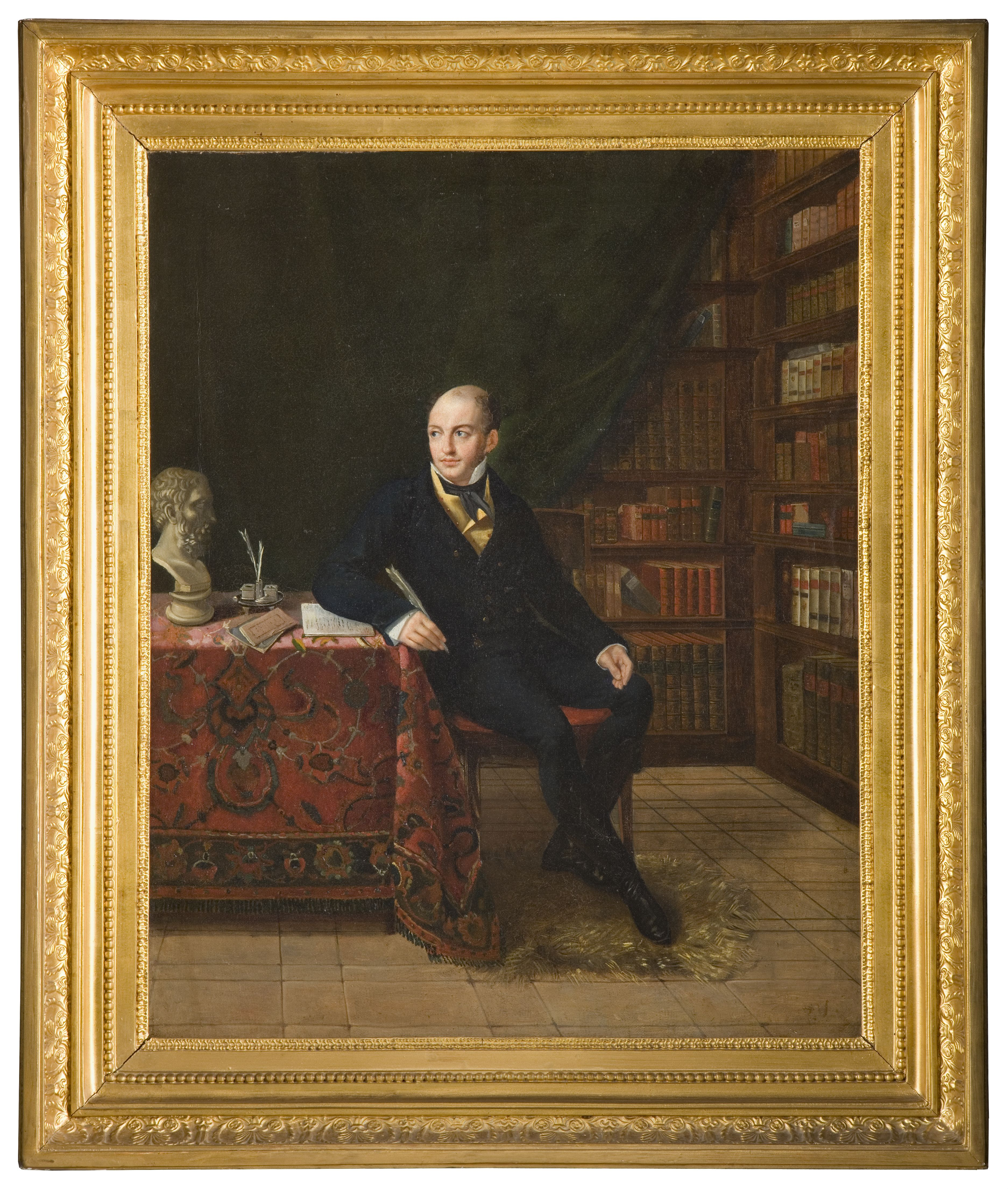
- Born: Louis Joseph Antoine de Potter de Droogenwalle; 26 April 1786; Bruges, Austrian Netherlands (modern-day Belgium)
- Died: 22 July 1859 (aged 73); Bruges, Belgium
- Other name: Demophile
- Occupations: Journalist, leading Belgian politician, literature author
- Known for: leading briefly the "Central Committee" of the Belgian revolution of 1830
- Family: de Potter de Droogenwalle

Louis de Potter (26 April 1786 – 22 July 1859), was a Belgian journalist, revolutionary, politician and writer. Out of the more than 100 books and pamphlets, one of the most notable works was his famous Letter to my Fellow Citizens in which he promoted democracy, universal electoral rights and the unity among Belgian liberals and Catholics. As one of the heroes of the Belgian Revolution, he proclaimed the independence of Belgium from the Netherlands (from the terrace of the Brussels City Hall on 28 September 1830), and inaugurated the first Belgian parliamentary assembly (on 10 November 1830), on behalf of the outgoing Belgian provisional government.

== Life ==
Coat of arms of the de Potter de Droogenwalle family

De Potter belonged to a rich noble family (his father was the Esquire Clément de Potter de Droogenwalle) which sought asylum in Germany after the second French invasion of the Southern Netherlands in 1794 and remained there until the Consulate. This meant that Louis's education in Bruges remained largely incomplete and so he restarted it during the family's time abroad, wanting to learn Latin, ancient Greek and modern languages. He spent 12 years in Italy (in Rome from 1811 to 1821 and in Florence from 1821 to 1823) to study the history of the Roman Catholic church, though he studied it with the prejudices which predominated in Enlightenment thoughts. He then discovered the foundations of the reforms made in the "aristocratic republics of Italy" and those of the revolution for the French republic. While in Rome, he began an affair with the Italian painter, Matilde Malenchini, that lasted until 1826.

In 1816 he had already published his Considérations sur l'histoire des principaux conciles depuis les apôtres jusqu'au Grand Schisme d'Occident (Considerations on the history of the main councils from the apostles to the Great Western Schism). In 1821, he completed this first work with another, in six volumes, titled L'Esprit de l'Église ou Considérations sur l'histoire des conciles et des papes, depuis Charlemagne jusqu'à nos jours (The Spirit of the Church, or Considerations on the history of the councils and the popes, from Charlemagne to our own days).

During his stay in Florence, he had access to the archives and library of Bishop Ricci - minister-counsellor of the Grand-Duke of Habsburg - it was there that he gathered the materials for a third work, Vie de Scipion de Ricci, évêque de Pistoie et de Prato (Life of Scipione de' Ricci, bishop of Pistoia and of Prato). This was published in 1825, and was immediately translated into German and English. The author's aim in this work was to glorify Josephinism, the justification of the reforms carried out in Tuscany under the auspices of grand duke Pietro Leopold I of Tuscany, brother of Joseph II.

De Potter was a founding member of the first Société des douze.

After a long residence in Germany, France, and Italy, he returned to Bruges in 1823, initially very satisfied to see the northern and southern Netherlands united under the rule of William of Nassau. He wrote "I thank fate for destining me to live under liberal political institutions, which, by the principals of moderation and equity, put no barrier in the way of thought". After his father's death, he left Bruges and settled in Brussels, but did not re-assume the title to which his noble blood entitled him. Even so, he had to get a job and was on very good terms with the whole cabinet, or at least with the head of the department of the interior, Pierre van Gobbelschroy, his former classmate.

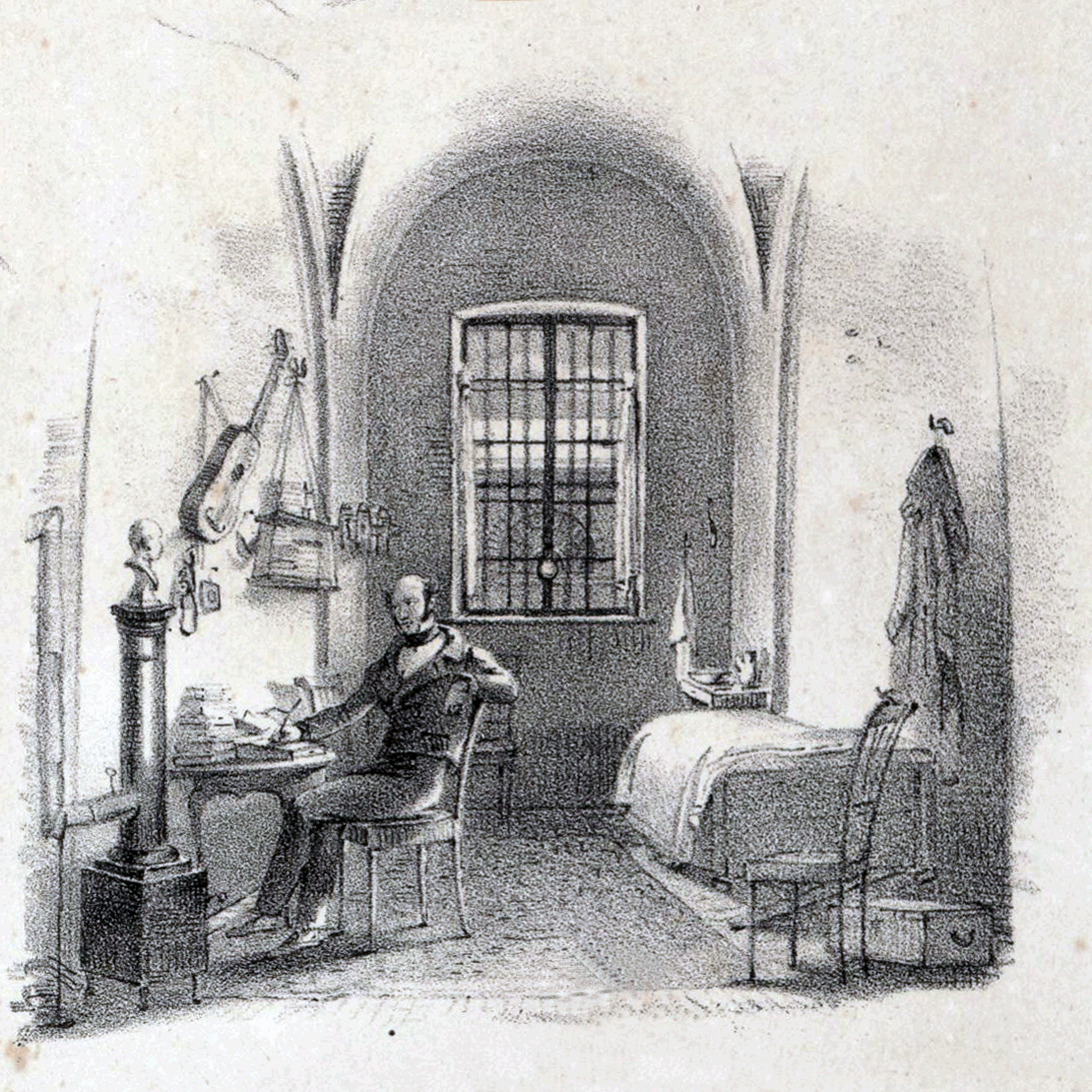
De Potter in prison

De Potter began his political career as editor of the liberal opposition journal Le Courrier des Pays-Bas. He deployed his verve as a polemicist against the Catholic clergy, the aristocracy and William I's government. One of his articles, published on 8 November 1828, was a violent pamphlet against the king's ministers and marked the journal's rallying to the cause of unionism. Minister of Justice Cornelis Van Maanen hounded de Potter for this opposition to William's government and finally had him found guilty on 20 December 1828, condemning him to 18 months' detention and a fine of 1000 florins. On 8 January 1830, William I revoked the job and pension of all members of the Belgian estates general who opposed his policies. De Potter was then still in prison and there launched the idea of a national subscription to compensate deputies and civil servants who had fallen prey to this measure.

Van Maanen continued to hound de Potter, this time for plotting against the state and exciting revolt, and so on 30 April 1830 he was sentenced to an 8-year exile by the Brussels court of assizes for publications composed in prison, such as the pamphlet on the Union of the Catholics and Liberals (de Potter's co-plotters and friends Jean-François Tielemans and Adolphe Bartels were condemned to seven years' banishment at the same sitting). He thought of spending his exile in France, but this country refused to welcome him and so he ended up in Prussia until the July Revolution, when France did allow him in. After the Belgian Revolution, he returned to Brussels and was a member of the provisional government. In it he was given the specific task of planning the basic laws for the new state of Belgium. On 10 November he pronounced the opening of the National Congress of Belgium, in favour of a Republican regime. After the Congress pronounced itself in favour of a constitutional monarchy on 13 November 1830 he returned to private life and upon the provisional government's downfall he withdrew to France.

== Works ==
- Considérations sur l'histoire des principaux conciles depuis les apôtres jusqu'au Grand Schisme d'Occident, 1816
- L'Esprit de l'Église ou Considérations sur l'histoire des conciles et des papes, depuis Charlemagne jusqu'à nos jours, 6 volumes, 1821
- Vie de Scipion de Ricci, évêque de Pistoie et de Prato, 1825.
- Saint-Napoléon, en paradis et en exil, 1825.
- Lettres de saint Pie V sur les affaires religieuses en France, 1826.
- L'Union des catholiques et des libéraux dans les Pays-Bas, (1ste editie juli 1829, 2e editie, Brussel 1831)
- Lettre de Démophile à M. Van Gobbelschroy sur la garantie de la liberté des Belges à l'époque de l'ouverture de la session des états généraux (1829-1830).
- Lettre de Démophile au roi sur le nouveau projet de loi contre la presse et le message royal qui l'accompagne, 1829
- Correspondance de De Potter avec Thielemans, depuis la prison des Petits Carmes, Brussel, 1829
- Lettre à mes concitoyens, Brussel, 1830
- De la Révolution à faire d'après l'expérience des révolutions avortées (1831)
- Éléments de tolérance à l'usage des catholiques belges (1834)
- Questions aux catholiques belges sur l'encyclique de M. de Lamennais (1835).
- Histoire du christianisme (Parijs 1836)
- Résumé de l'histoire du christianisme (1856)
- La Révolution belge de 1828 à 1839, souvenirs personnels (Brussel 1838-39)
- Études sociales, (1843)
- La Justice et la Sanction religieuse (1846)
- La Réalité déterminée par le raisonnement (1848)
- A B C de la science sociale (1848)
- Catéchisme social (1850)
- Catéchisme rationnel (1854)
- Dictionnaire rationnel (1859).
