= Unionism in Belgium =

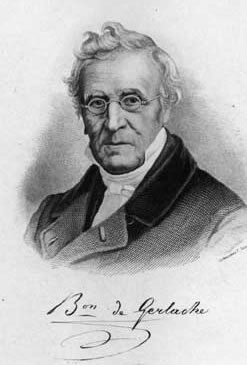

In the politics of Belgium, Unionism or Union of Opposites (union des oppositions) is a Belgian political movement that existed from the 1820s to 1846. (In the present day, the term 'unionists' is sometimes used in a Belgian context to describe those who oppose the partition of Belgium, such as members of the Belgische Unie – Union Belge and l’Unie parties.

== History ==
It existed before and after the Belgian Revolution of 1830 and advocated the union of Catholics and liberals against the policies of William I of the Netherlands. The new nation's motto, L'Union fait la force or unity makes strength, referred to this union rather than to the union of the country's different linguistic communities.

The liberals were initially quite favourable towards the lay policy of William's enlightened absolutism but more and more they changed their attitude, giving less and less importance to their struggle against church influence and more and more importance to political liberties, which William I was obstinately refusing to grant. Those following this new trend were known as 'radical liberals', as opposed to the 'Voltairian liberals' (libéraux voltairiens) who supported the enlightened absolutist regime and gave rise to Orangism.

This evolution enabled the 'radical liberals' to make a compromise with the Catholics, who were ready to make certain concessions as to the freedom of the press and freedom of religion in return. From 1825, Étienne de Gerlache made a failed attempt at a compromise and reconciliation. At the end of 1827, in Liège, the Catholic newspaper le Courrier de la Meuse and the liberal newspaper Mathieu Laensbergh underwent a rapprochement. The union was decisively concluded on 8 November 1828 when the liberal Brussels newspaper le Courrier des Pays-Bas rallied to this policy in an article by Louis De Potter.

In the years following the Belgian Revolution, and after the exclusion of the radical democrats and the republicans (including De Potter), the unionist policy was imposed as a necessity in continuing Belgium's independence. Belgium's first cabinets were thus 'unionist', allying the conservative nobility with moderate elements from the rising liberal middle class. This formula allowed the structures of the new state to be consolidated, stable political and judicial institutions to be put in place and accords on centralization, the cities' and provinces' roles and primary education to be signed.

However, dissension between Catholics and liberals became increasingly strong, on questions such as the clergy's role in civil society or the state taking over responsibility for education and public welfare. Unionism was finally ended by the foundation of the Liberal Party in 1846 and the first Liberal Party government the following year. The Catholic party would gradually be created in response and Belgium was ruled by single-party governments from one or other of these two parties until the socialist movement arose and reached power thanks to the institution of universal suffrage in 1948.

== Belgian Unionists ==
Apart from king Leopold, a staunch unionist, a number of Belgian political leaders were of the same opinion, including:

- Joseph Lebeau
- Pierre de Decker
- Louis De Potter
- Étienne de Sauvage
- Félix de Muelenaere
- Étienne de Gerlache
- Goswin de Stassart
- Barthélémy de Theux de Meylandt
- Paul Devaux
- Jean-Baptiste Nothomb
- Sylvain van de Weyer

== See also ==
- Pillarisation

== Literature ==
- Henri PIRENNE, Histoire de la Belgique, vol. VII (1830 – 1914), Bruxelles, Maurice Lamertin, 1932.
- Charles DU BUS DE WARNAFFE, Au temps de l'Unionisme. Contribution à l'étude de la formation de l'État belge d'après la correspondance de François et Edmond du Bus, Tournai, 1944.
- A. SIMON, Aspects de l'Unionisme. Documents inédits, 1830-1857, Wetteren, 1958.
- C. LEBAS, L'union des catholiques et des libéraux de 1839 à 1847 : étude sur les pouvoirs exécutif et législatif, Louvain, Nauwelaerts, 1960.
- Theo LUYCKX, Politieke geschiedenis van België, Bruxelles/Amsterdam, 1964.
- A. VERMEERSCH, Vereniging en revolutie. De Nederlanden 1814-1830, Bussum, 1970.
- Els WITTE & Jan CRAEYBECKX, Politieke geschiedenis van België sinds 1830, Antwerpen, Standaard uitgeverij, 1981.
- Els WITTE et Jan CRAEYBECKX, La Belgique politique de 1830 à nos jours : les tensions d’une démocratie bourgeoise, Bruxelles, Labor, 1987.
- Pascal DELWIT, Composition, décomposition, recomposition du paysage politique en Belgique, Bruxelles, Labor, 2003.
- Els WITTE, La construction de la Belgique (1828 – 1847), in: Nouvelle histoire de Belgique, vol. I (1830 – 1905), sous la dir. de M. DUMOULIN, Bruxelles, Complexe, 2005.
- Éliane GUBIN & Jean-Pierre NANDRIN, Nouvelle Histoire de Belgique volume I, tome 2, La Belgique libérale et bourgeoise, Brussels, Éditions Complexe, 2005, ISBN 2-8048-0066-0.
- Pascal DELWIT, La vie politique en Belgique de 1830 à nos jours, Bruxelles, Éd. de l’Université de Bruxelles, 2009.
- Xavier MABILLE, Nouvelle histoire politique de la Belgique, Bruxelles, CRISP, 2011.
