= Almanach de Liège =

Stars influences on human affairs

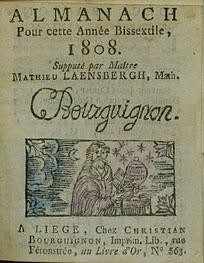
Almanach

The Almanach de Liège or Almanach Matthieu Lansbert (also spelled Lansberg, Lansbergh, Laensberg or Laensbergh) was an almanac published annually from the 17th century onwards (the oldest surviving edition dates to 1626). This version lasted until 1792, when the tribulations of the Liège Revolution resulted in the abolition of the Prince-Bishopric of Liège.

The almanac revealed the stars' influences on human affairs and provided practical, medical and household advice, stories and anecdotes on current affairs. For some of its predictions the Almanach de Liège used a hieroglyphic style, officially to cater for the illiterate but also to encode messages at another level, as communications between secret societies, which were booming in that era. This was the era of Galileo – some new ideas and ancient knowledge was circulated under this cloak. The Rosicrucians, for example, were well established in the Prince-Bishopric, even among the clergy – a cleric attached to the prince-bishop's court probably lay behind the pseudonym 'Matthieu Lansbert'.

Bizarrely, despite its esoteric contents and content of trivia, the Almanach received the assent of the religious and civil authorities, which would certainly explain its success. In the 18th century, Sébastien Mercier estimated its circulation at 60,000. Some of these were specially bound copies sent by the Prince-Bishopric as diplomatic gifts to major figures in foreign courts. It was also cited as an emanation of obscurantism by many Enlightenment philosophers, including Voltaire and Alexandre Dumas. In chapter 31 of his Philosophie de l'histoire, Voltaire wrote:

Most of the predictions were those from the Almanach de Liège – "A great man will die, there will be shipwrecks". Did a judge in the village die that year? For the village, this was the death that had been predicted. Did a fishing bark sink? – that's the shipwrecks they announced. ... The Almanach de Liège said that a people who would destroy everything would come from the north – this people did not come – but a wind from the north froze some vines, [so people said it was] this that had been predicted by Matthieu Lansberg. What if someone dares to doubt his knowledge? Hawkers immediately denounce him as a bad citizen, and astrologers treat him as small-minded and a lying thinker.

Even so, Enlightenment philosophers wanted to take advantage of the publication's wide circulation:

Honest people who sometimes read Virgil, or provincial letters, draw on twenty times more copies of the almanach de Liège ... than of all the good ancient and modern books.

The Dictionnaire universel des sciences morale, économique, politique et diplomatique begun at Liège in 1777, called on the Almanach to transform itself into "a sort of practical encyclopaedia which would inform the people of their rights and duties and contribute also to their moral liberation". During the reign of William I of the Netherlands, in the run up to the Belgian Revolution, the Matthieu Lansbergh later became a daily newspaper spreading the liberal then unionist ideas of Paul Devaux, Joseph Lebeau and Charles Rogier – in this form, it was later renamed Le Politique. In the present day an Almanach de Liège is published annually by Casterman.
