= Quod aliquantum =

1791 papal encyclical opposing French church reform

Quod aliquantum Papal brief of Pope Pius VI
- Signature date: 10 March 1791
- Subject: Condemnation of the Civil Constitution of the Clergy
- Text: In Latin

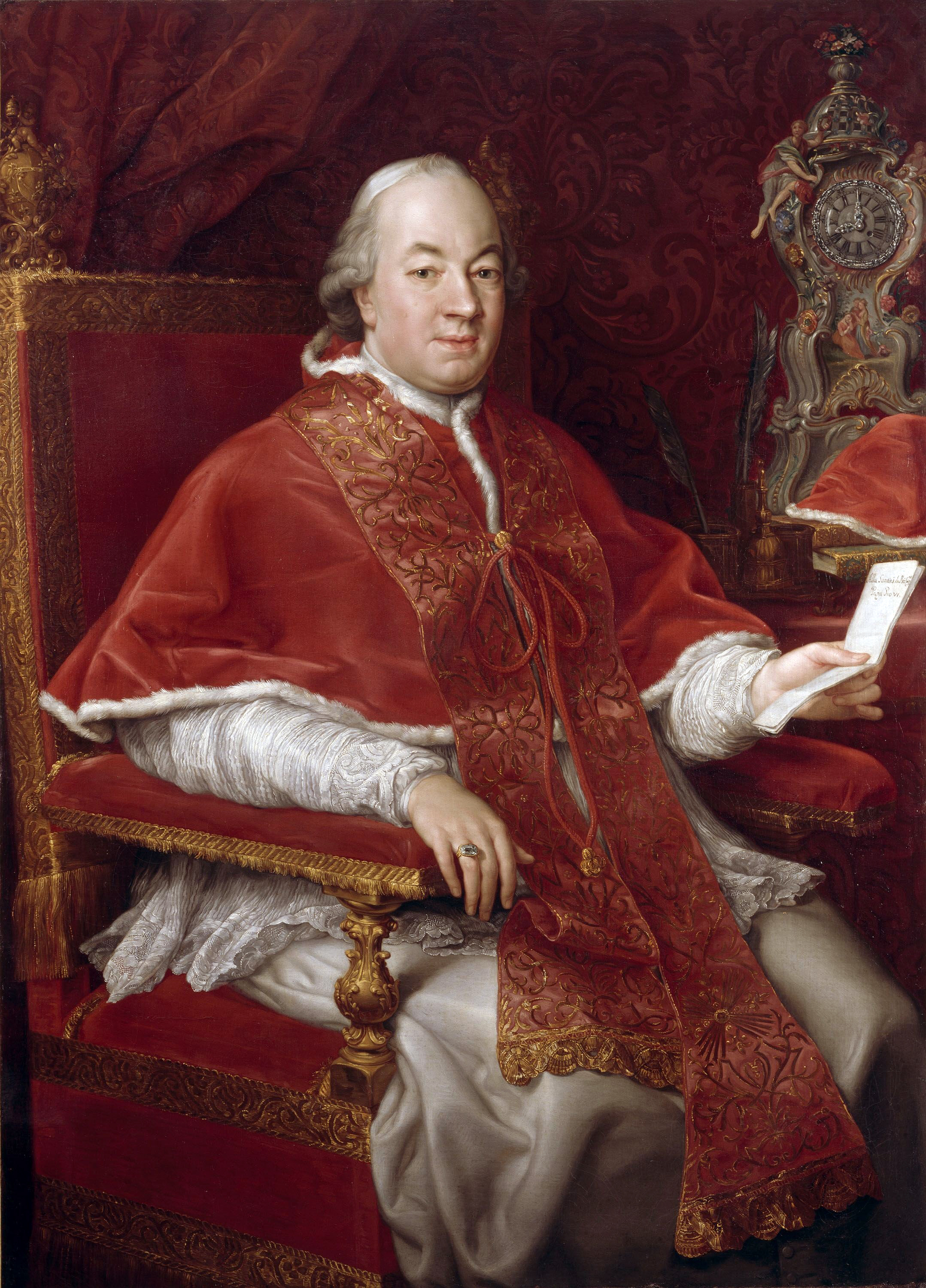
Pope Pius VI

Quod aliquantum is a papal brief issued by Pius VI on 10 March 1791 in condemnation of the Civil Constitution of the Clergy adopted by the French National Assembly.

Pius criticized the Constitution and other encroachments on the Church made by the National Assembly, such as the breach of the concordat, the confiscation of church property and the suppression of religious orders. He also condemned their definition of the rights of man as contradicting the teachings of the Church and he further alleged that it was being used by the Assembly with the intention of destroying the Church. Pius claimed that secular institutions had no right to make laws on spiritual matters.

Pius condemned those principles whose "necessary effect [is] to destroy the Catholic religion, and with it, the obedience due to kings":

It is with this end in view that they establish, as a right of man in society, this absolute liberty, which not only assures the right of not being disturbed in regard to his religious opinions, but which also grants that license of thought, of writing and even shamelessly publishing on the subject of religion whatever the most unruly imagination might suggest. This monstrous right nevertheless appears to the Assembly to result from the equality and liberty which are natural to all men. But what could there be more outrageous than to establish among men this equality and this unbridled liberty which will snuff out reason, the most precious gift that nature has given to man, and the only one which distinguishes him from the animals?

Pius declared that such doctrines were contrary to God and continued:

It is nature herself, therefore, which (decrees) that the usage which each must make of his reason should consist essentially in recognizing his sovereign author. ... In order to make this phantom of unlimited freedom vanish from the eyes of healthy reason, is it not enough to say that this system was that of the Vaudois and the Beguars?

Pius also condemned the Constitution for destroying the jurisdiction and primacy of the Pope and claimed that the clause for the election of Bishops was a revival of the teachings of Martin Luther and John Calvin. The oath for the clergy adopted by the Assembly Pius compared to those used by Henry VIII to destroy papal authority. He warned the French clergy to preserve their unity in the face of the attacks made by the Assembly.
