= Pope Pius VI =

Head of the Catholic Church from 1775 to 1799

- Bishop of Rome
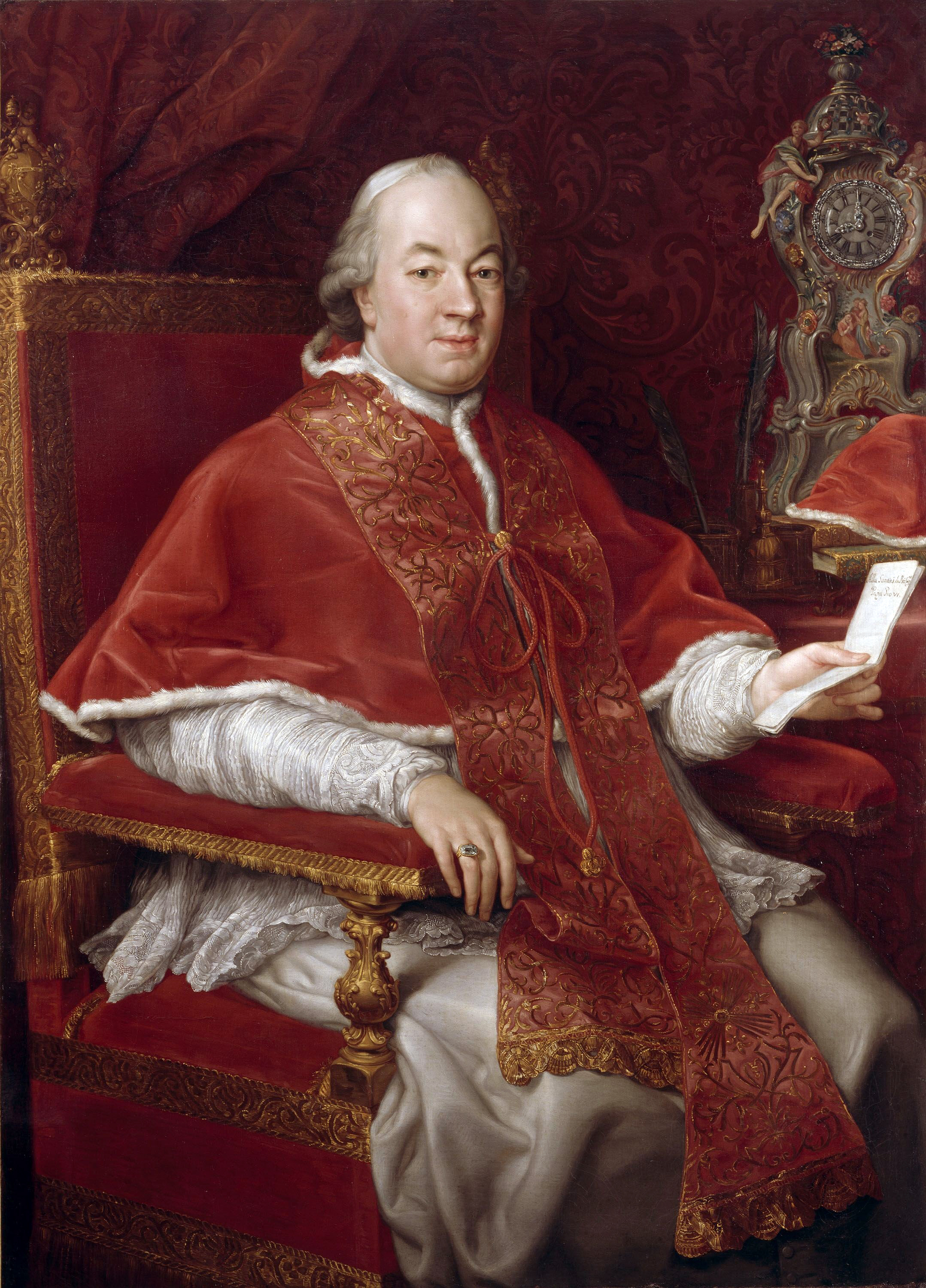
- Portrait by Pompeo Batoni, 1775
- Church: Catholic Church
- Papacy began: 15 February 1775
- Papacy ended: 29 August 1799
- Predecessor: Clement XIV
- Successor: Pius VII
- Previous posts: Referendary of the Apostolic Signatura (1758–1759); General Treasurer of the Apostolic Camera (1766–1773); Commendatory Abbot of Santa Maria di Valdiponte (1767–1773); Commendatory Abbot of Subiaco (1773–1798); Cardinal-Priest of Sant’Onofrio (1773–1775)

Orders
- Ordination: 1758
- Consecration: 22 February 1775 by Gian Francesco Albani
- Created cardinal: 26 April 1773 by Clement XIV

Personal details
- Born: Angelo Onofrio Melchiorre Natale Giovanni Antonio Braschi; 25 December 1717 Cesena, Papal States
- Died: 29 August 1799 (aged 81) Valence, France
- Motto: Floret in Domo Domini (It blossoms in the house of God)

- Coat of arms

Pope Pius VI (Italian: Pio VI; born Count Angelo Onofrio Melchiorre Natale Giovanni Antonio called Giovanni Angelo or Giannangelo Braschi, 25 December 1717 – 29 August 1799) was head of the Catholic Church and leader of the Papal States from 15 February 1775 to his death in August 1799.

Born in Cesena, he was elected Pope in the 1774–1775 conclave. Pius VI condemned the French Revolution and the persecution of the Catholic Church in France that resulted from it. French troops commanded by Napoleon Bonaparte defeated the Papal army and occupied the Papal States in 1796. In 1798, upon his refusal to renounce his temporal power, Pius was taken prisoner and transported to France. He died eighteen months later in Valence. His reign of more than twenty-four years is the fifth-longest in papal history. He was also the longest-serving pope of the Papal States.

== Biography ==
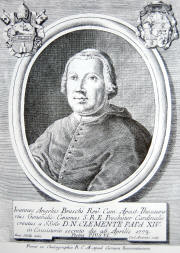
Cardinal Braschi c. 1773

=== Early years ===
Giovanni Angelo Braschi was born in Cesena on Christmas Day in 1717 as the eldest of eight children to Count Marco Aurelio Tommaso Braschi and Anna Teresa. His grandmother was Cornelia Zangari Bandi, an aristocrat known for the mysterious circumstances of her death. His uncle was Cardinal Giovanni Carlo Bandi. His nephew was Romoaldo Braschi-Onesti, the penultimate cardinal-nephew.

Braschi was baptized in Cesena two days later on 27 December and was given the baptismal name of Angelo Onofrio Melchiorre Natale Giovanni Antonio. After completing his studies in the Jesuit college of Cesena and receiving his doctorate of both canon and civil law in 1734, Braschi continued his studies at the University of Ferrara.

=== The priest ===
Braschi became the private secretary of papal legate Cardinal Tommaso Ruffo, Bishop of Ostia and Velletri. Cardinal Ruffo took him as his conclavist at the 1740 papal conclave and when the latter became the Dean of the College of Cardinals in 1740, Braschi was appointed as his auditor, a post he held until 1753.

Braschi's skill in the conduct of a mission to the court of Naples won him the esteem of Pope Benedict XIV. In 1753, following the death of Cardinal Ruffo, Benedict appointed Braschi one of his own secretaries. In 1755, the pope appointed him as a canon of St Peter's Basilica.

In 1758, putting an end to an engagement to be married, Braschi was ordained to the priesthood. He was also appointed in 1758 Referendary of the Apostolic Signatura and held that position until the following year. He also became the auditor and secretary to Cardinal Carlo Rezzonico, the nephew of Pope Clement XIII. In 1766, Clement XIII appointed Braschi treasurer of the camera apostolica.

=== The cardinal ===
Braschi was a conscientious administrator, which was not good news for some. The latter managed to convince Pope Clement XIV to curb his zeal by promoting him to the cardinalate and accordingly on 26 April 1773 he was made Cardinal-Priest of Sant'Onofrio. For a brief period of time this rendered him innocuous to the less scrupulous. Left without any specific task, Braschi retired to the Abbey of Saint Scholastica, Subiaco, of which he was commendatory abbot.

== Papacy ==
=== Papal election ===
Papal styles of Pope Pius VI
- Reference style: His Holiness
- Spoken style: Your Holiness
- Religious style: Holy Father
- Posthumous style: None

Pope Clement XIV died in 1774 and in the ensuing conclave to choose a successor, Spain, France and Portugal dropped all objections to the election of Braschi, who was one of the more moderate opponents of the anti-Jesuit stance of the late pope.

Braschi received support from those who disliked the Jesuits and believed he would continue the policy of Clement XIV and maintain the provisions of Clement's brief Dominus ac Redemptor (1773) which had dissolved the order. On the other hand, the pro-Jesuit Zelanti faction believed him to be secretly sympathetic towards the order and expected him to remedy the wrongs the Jesuits suffered in the previous pontificate. These various expectations would face Braschi after his election with the virtual impossibility of satisfying either side.

Cardinal Braschi was elected pope on 15 February 1775 and took the name "Pius VI". He was consecrated bishop on 22 February 1775 by Cardinal Gian Francesco Albani and was crowned that same day by the Cardinal Protodeacon Alessandro Albani.

=== First actions ===
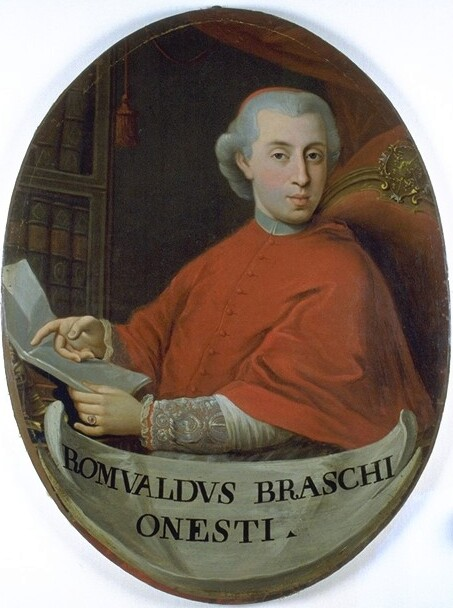
Pius VI elevated Romualdo Braschi-Onesti as the penultimate cardinal-nephew.

Pius VI first opened a jubilee his predecessor had already convoked, the 1775 Jubilee Year.

The early acts of Pius VI gave fair promise of reformist rule and tackled the problem of corruption in the Papal States. He reprimanded Prince Potenziani, the governor of Rome, for failing to adequately deal with corruption in the city, appointed a council of cardinals to remedy the state of the finances and relieve the pressure of imposts, called to account Nicolò Bischi for the spending of funds intended for the purchase of grain, reduced the annual disbursements by denying pensions to many prominent people, and adopted a reward system to encourage agriculture.

=== Society of Jesus ===
Upon his election, Pius VI ordered the release of Lorenzo Ricci, Superior General of the Society of Jesus, who was held prisoner in the Castel Sant'Angelo, but Ricci died before the decree of liberation arrived. It is perhaps due to Pius VI that the Jesuits managed to escape dissolution in White Ruthenia and Silesia. In 1792, the pope considered the universal re-establishment of the Society of Jesus as a bulwark against the ideas of the French Revolution, but did not carry this through.

=== Gallican and Febronian protests ===
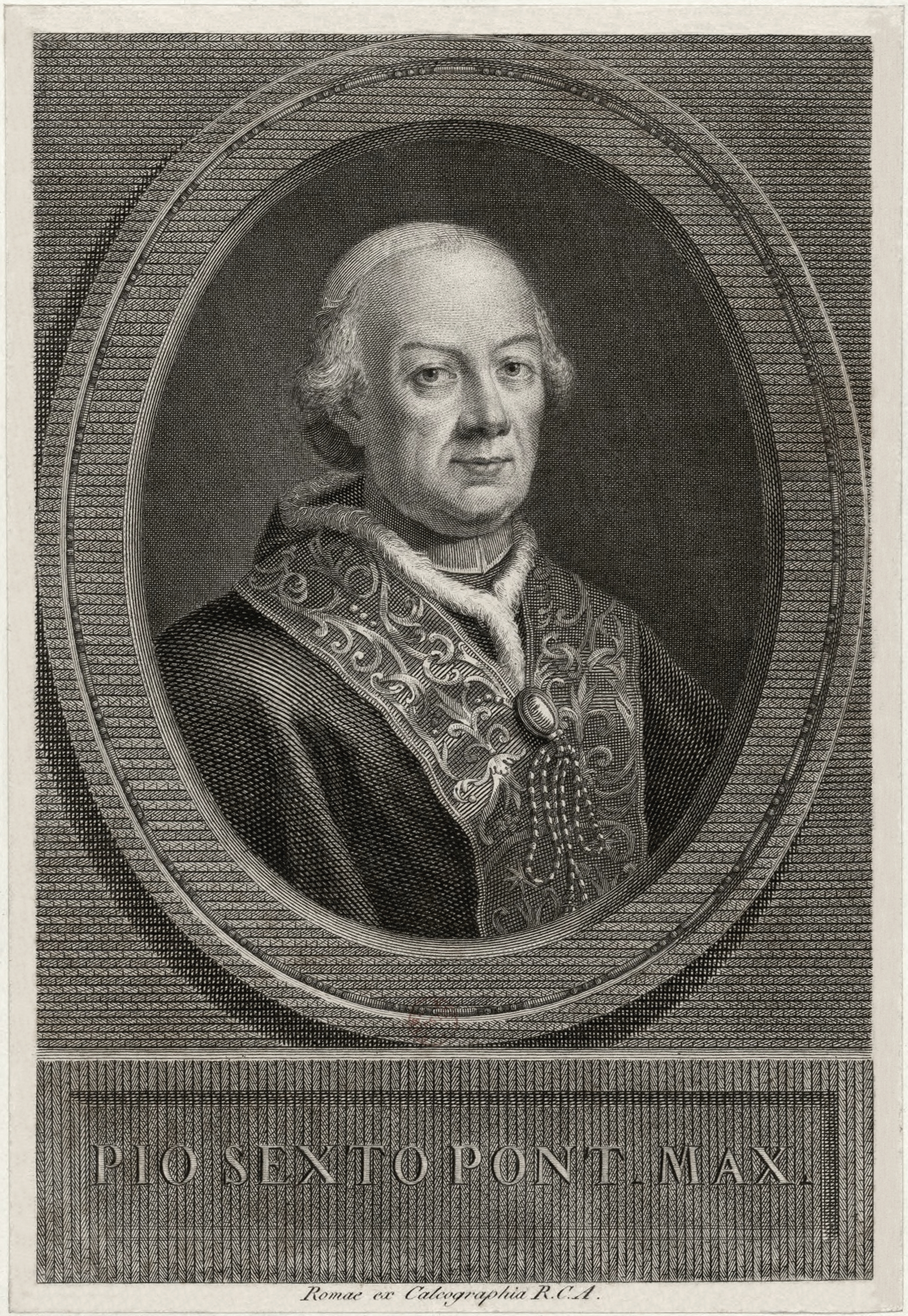
Pius VI

Besides facing dissatisfaction with this temporising policy, Pius VI also faced elements of Enlightenment thinking which sought to limit papal authority. Johann Nikolaus von Hontheim, since 1749 bishop of Myriophiri in partibus and auxiliary bishop and vicar-general to the archbishop-elector of Mainz, wrote under the pseudonym of "Febronius", expounding Gallican ideas of national Catholic Churches. Although Hontheim was himself induced (not without public controversy) publicly to retract his positions, they were nevertheless adopted in Austria. There the social and ecclesiastical reforms which had been undertaken by Emperor Joseph II and his minister Kaunitz, as a way of influencing appointments within the Catholic hierarchy, were seen as such a threat touched to papal authority that Pius VI adopted the exceptional course of travelling in person to Vienna.

The Pope set out from Rome on 27 February 1782 and, though magnificently received by the Emperor, his mission proved a failure. Nevertheless, not many years later he did succeed in curbing the attempts of several German archbishops at the Congress of Ems in 1786 to win greater independence.

=== Liberal opposition ===
In the Kingdom of Naples the liberal minister Bernardo Tanucci agitated for certain concessions regarding feudal homage due to the papacy and some concessions were made. More serious disagreements arose with Leopold II, later emperor, and Scipione de' Ricci, bishop of Pistoia and Prato, upon the questions of proposed liberal reforms to the Church in the Grand Duchy of Tuscany. The papal bull Auctorem fidei, issued on 28 August 1794, is a condemnation of the Gallican and Jansenist propositions and tendencies of the Synod of Pistoia (1786).

=== Other activities ===
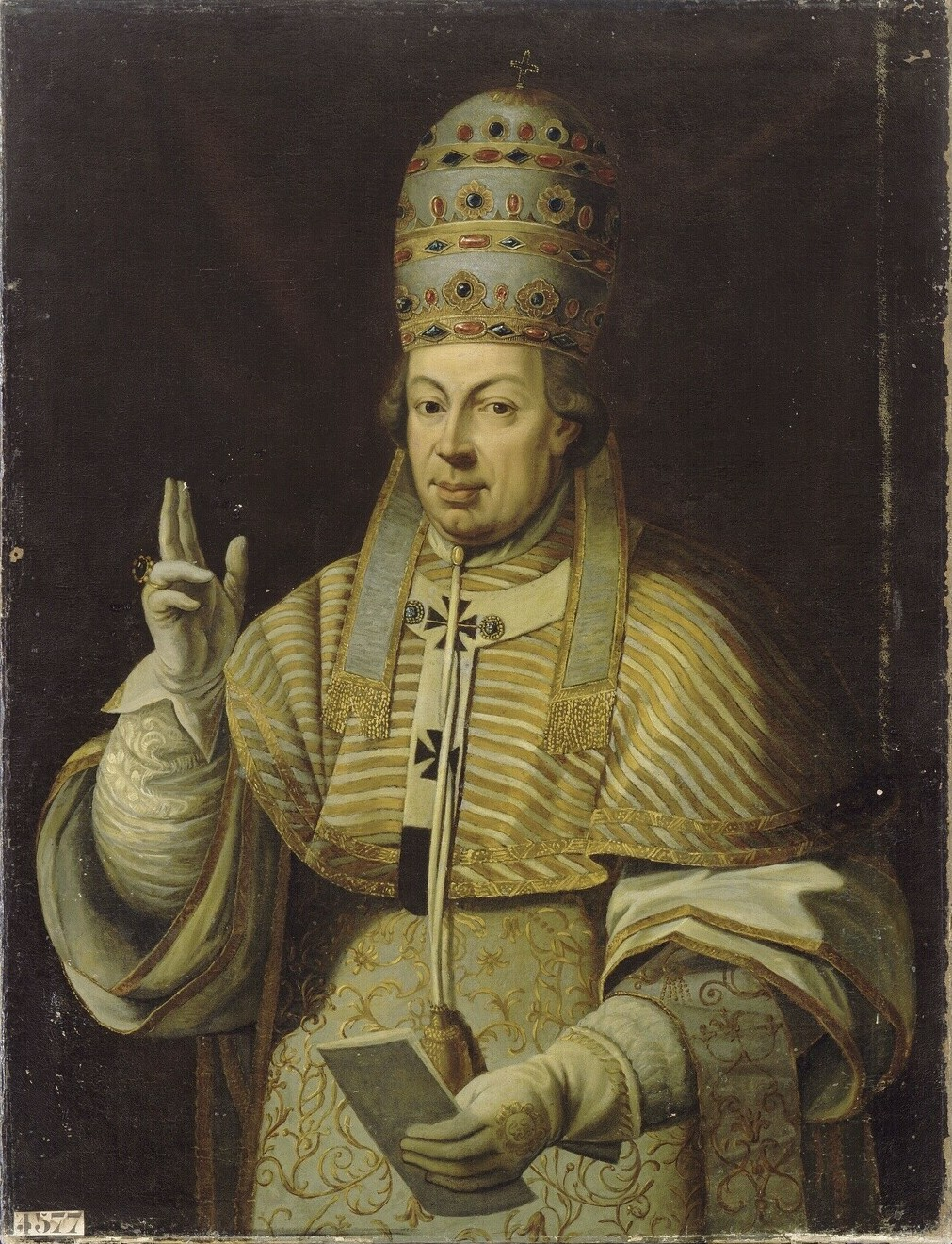
Pope Pius VI, c. 1775–76

On 17 August 1775, Pope Pius VI promulgated with a Papal Decree the authenticity of Our Lady of Šiluva.

Pius VI saw the development of the Catholic Church in the United States of America. He released the American clergy from the jurisdiction of the Vicar Apostolic in England, and erected the first American episcopal see, the Diocese of Baltimore in November 1789.

Pius VI elevated 73 cardinals in 23 consistories. He canonized no saints during his pontificate but beatified a total of 39 individuals that included Lawrence of Brindisi and Amato Ronconi.

The pope also set the Papal States' finances on much steadier ground. Pius is best remembered in connection with the expansion of the Pio-Clementine Museum, which was begun at the suggestion of his predecessor Clement XIV; and with an attempt to drain the Pontine Marshes, but Pius VI did successfully drain the marshes near Città della Pieve, Perugia, and Spoleto. He also restored the Via Appia. Pius VI also deepened and expanded the harbors of Terracina and Porto d'Anzio, a major center of Pontifical trade. Pius was a great patron of the arts and humanities; he also added a new sacristy to Saint Peter's Basilica.

=== French Revolution ===
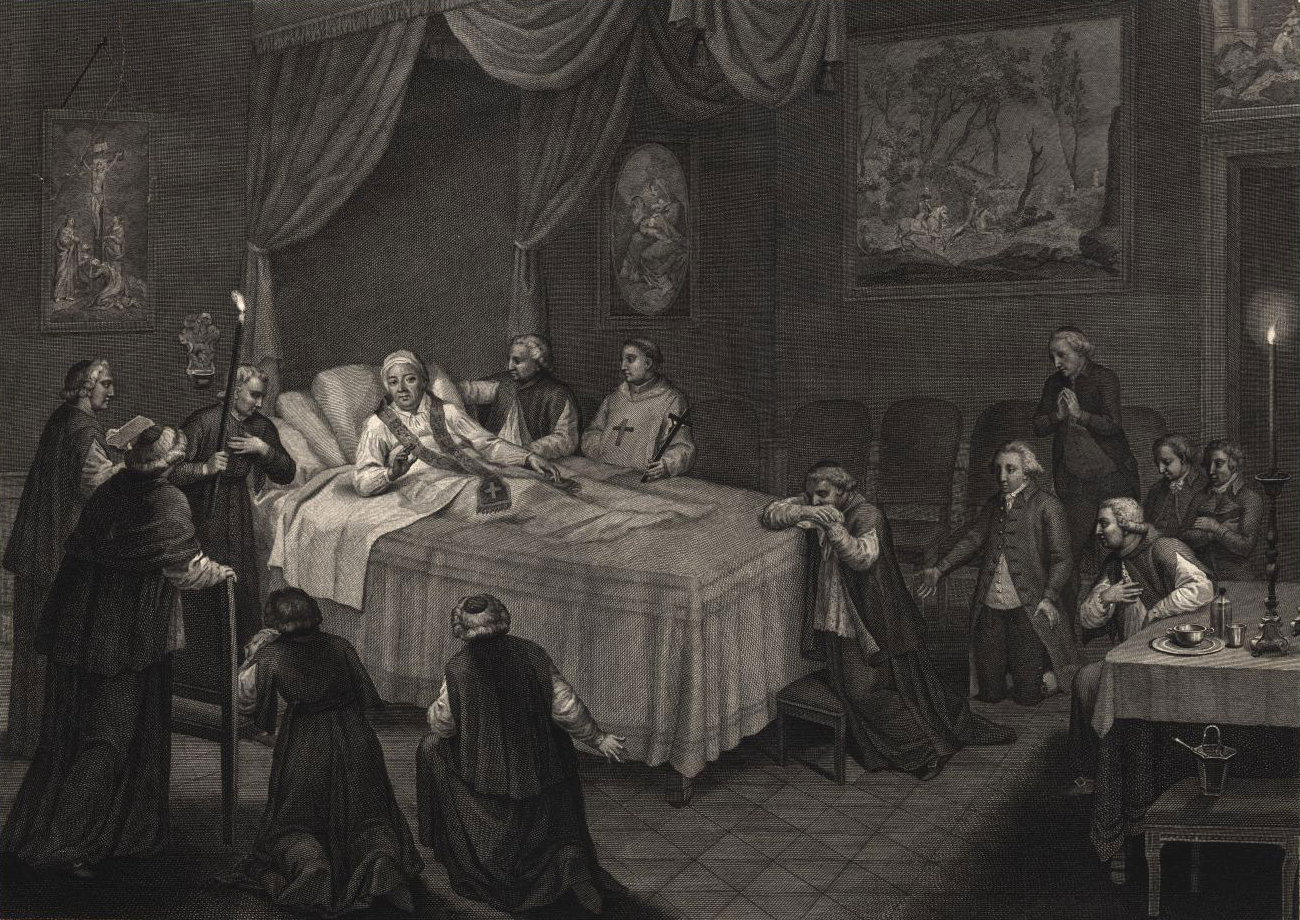
The death of Pope Pius VI

At the outbreak of the French Revolution in 1789, Pius VI witnessed the suppression of the old Gallican Church as well as the confiscation of pontifical and ecclesiastical possessions in France. He saw the events as a sign of opposition against the social order ordained by God and also viewed it as a conspiracy against the church. The pope condemned both the Declaration of the Rights of Man and of the Citizen and the Civil Constitution of the Clergy and supported a league against the revolution. He issued two briefs – Quod aliquantum (1791) and Caritas (1791) – to condemn the ecclesiastical reforms that were proposed.

1791 marked the end of diplomatic relations with France and the papal nuncio, Antonio Dugnani, was recalled to Rome as a result. One of the reasons for the breach was the seizure by the revolutionaries of the Comtat Venaissin, ending 516 years of Papal rule in Avignon.

King Louis XVI was executed via guillotine on 21 January 1793, and his daughter Marie Thérèse petitioned Rome for the canonization of her father. Pius VI hailed the late king as a martyr on 17 June 1793 in a meeting with cardinals, giving hope to a potential possibility of sainthood. In 1820, two decades following the death of Pius VI, the Congregation of Rites put an end to the possible sainthood since it was impossible to prove the king died for religious reasons rather than political ones. Pius VI argued that the main thrust of the revolution was against the Catholic religion and Louis XVI himself. He also wrote that the French revolutionaries abolished "the monarchy, the best of all governments".

=== Arrest and death under Napoleon ===
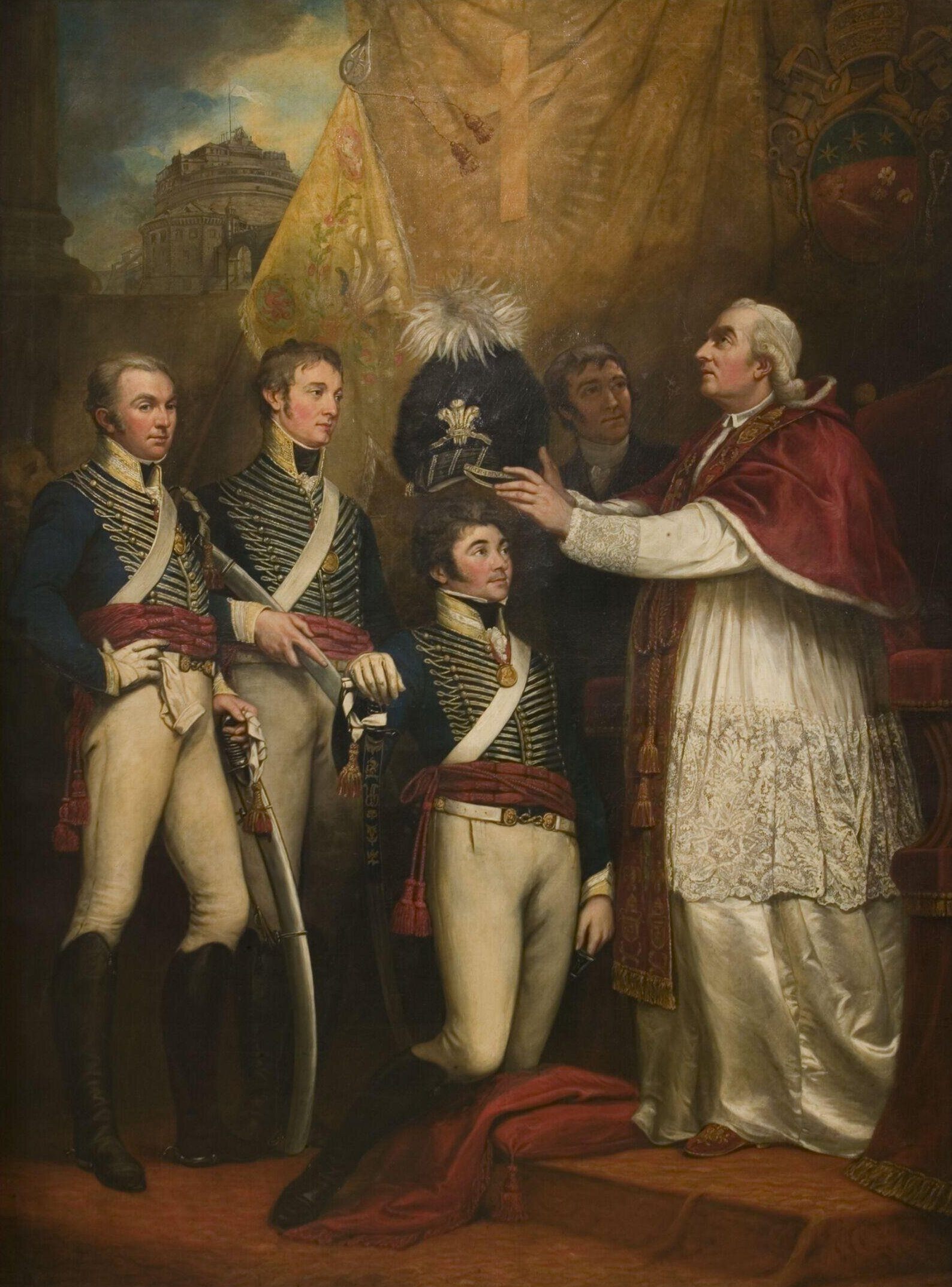
The Presentation of British Officers to Pope Pius VI, 1794 (James Northcote, 1800)

In 1796, French Republican troops under the command of Napoleon Bonaparte invaded Italy and defeated the Papal troops. The French occupied Ancona and Loreto. Pius VI sued for peace which was granted at Tolentino on 19 February 1797; but on 28 December 1797, in a riot blamed by papal forces on some Italian and French revolutionists, the popular brigadier-general Mathurin-Léonard Duphot, who had gone to Rome with Joseph Bonaparte as part of the French embassy, was killed and a new pretext was furnished for invasion.

General Louis-Alexandre Berthier marched to Rome, entered it unopposed on 10 February 1798, and, proclaiming a Roman Republic, demanded of the pope the renunciation of his temporal authority.

Upon his refusal, Pius was taken prisoner, and on 20 February was escorted from the Vatican to Siena, and thence to the Certosa near Florence. The French declaration of war against Tuscany led to his removal (he was escorted by the Spaniard Pedro Gómez Labrador, Marquis of Labrador) by way of Parma, Piacenza, Turin and Grenoble to the citadel of Valence, the chief town of Drôme where he died six weeks after his arrival, on 29 August 1799, having then reigned longer than any pope since Saint Peter. To date, he is the last Pope to die outside of Italian territory.

Pius VI's body was embalmed, but was not buried until 30 January 1800 after Napoleon saw political advantage to burying the deceased Pope in efforts to bring the Catholic Church back into France. His entourage insisted for some time that his last wishes were to be buried in Rome, then behind the Austrian lines. They also prevented a Constitutional bishop from presiding at the burial, as the laws of France then required, so no burial service was held. This return of the investiture conflict was settled by the Concordat of 1801.

Pius VI's body was removed from Valence on 24 December 1801 and buried at Rome 19 February 1802, when Pius VI was given a Catholic funeral, attended by Pope Pius VII, his successor.

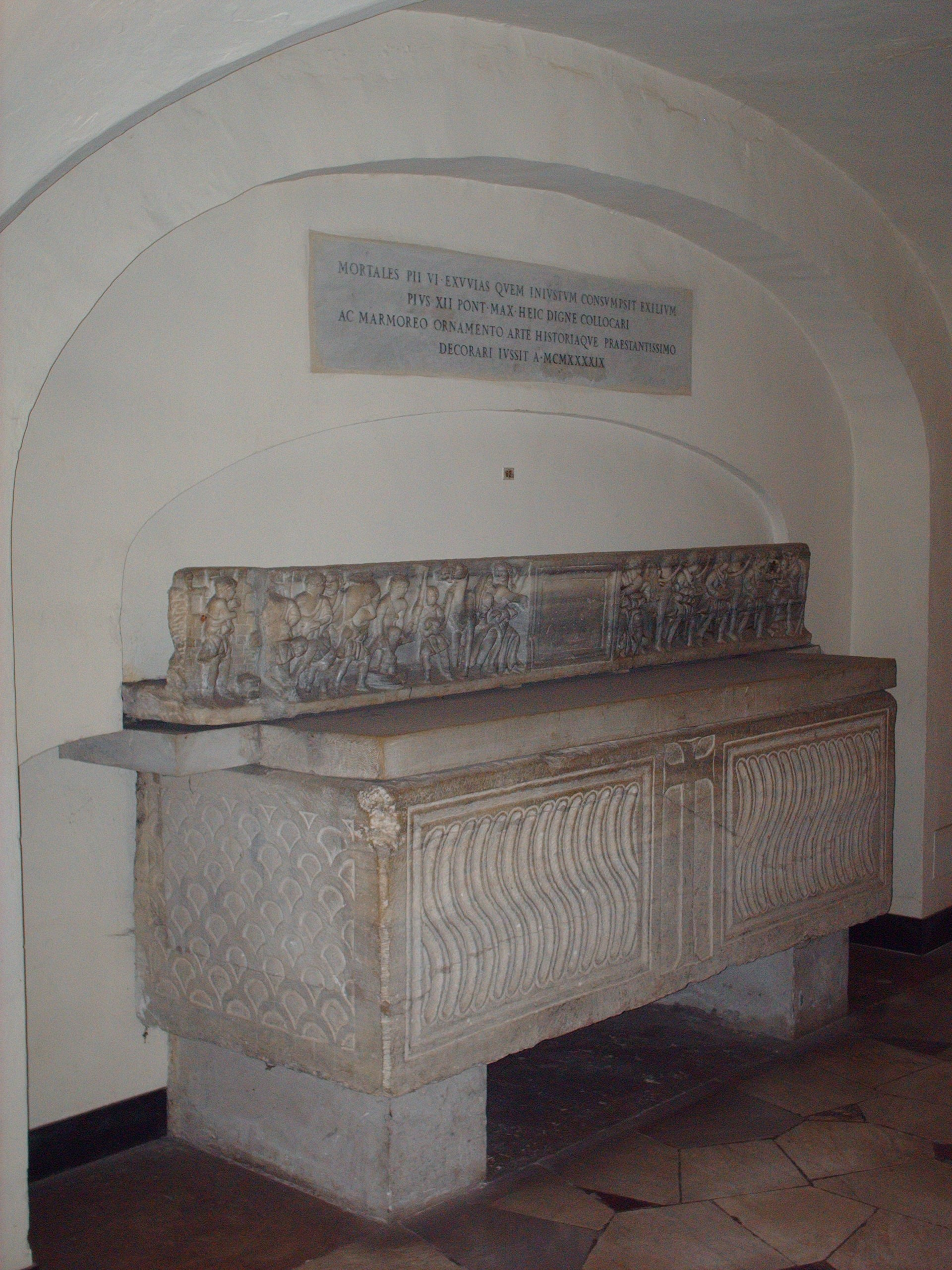
Tomb of Pope Pius VI

=== Reburial ===
By decree of Pope Pius XII in 1949, the remains of Pius VI were moved to the Chapel of the Madonna below St. Peter's in the Vatican Grottoes. His remains were placed in an ancient marble sarcophagus. The inscription on the wall above the container reads:

"The mortal remains of Pius VI, consumed in unjust exile, by order of Pius XII were placed fittingly here and decorated by a marble ornament most excellent for its art and history in 1949".

== Representation in literature ==
A long audience with Pius VI is one of the most extensive scenes in the Marquis de Sade's narrative Juliette, published in 1798. Juliette shows off her learning to the Pope (whom she most often addresses as "Braschi") with a verbal catalogue of alleged immoralities committed by his predecessors.

== See also ==
- Cardinals created by Pius VI
- List of popes
- Luis Ignatius Peñalver y Cárdenas
- Palazzo Ghini

Catholic Church titles
Preceded by Clement XIV	Pope; 15 February 1775 – 29 August 1799	Succeeded by Pius VII
