= Auctorem fidei =

Papal bull of Pope Pius VI

Auctorem fidei Latin for 'Author of the Faith' Papal bull of Pope Pius VI
- Signature date: 28 August 1794
- Subject: Condemnation of Jansenism

Auctorem fidei is a papal bull issued by Pius VI on 28 August, 1794 to condemn the tendency towards Gallicanism and Jansenist-tinged reforms of the Synod of Pistoia (1786).

The bull catalogued and condemned 85 articles of the Synod of Pistoia. After the bull's publication, Scipione de' Ricci submitted. In 1805, he took occasion of the presence of Pius VII in Florence on the latter's way to Rome from his exile in France to ask in person for pardon and reconciliation.

The document has been cited as a source of doctrinal orthodoxy when later popes were called to combat doctrinal errors in the 19th and 20th centuries. It is mentioned in Gregory XVI's brief, Quo graviora (1833) and his encyclical letters Commissum divinitus (1835) and Inter praecipuas machinationes (1844), and in Pius X's Pascendi Dominici gregis (1907) and Paul VI's Mysterium fidei (1965). Pius VI's statement on adoration of the person of Christ, whose humanity is inseparably united with "the person of the Word" (Proposition 63 in Auctorem fidei), is quoted by Pope Francis in his encyclical letter Dilexit nos (2024).
