= François de Robiano =

Belgian politician and art collector

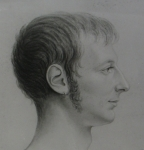
- Born: François Xavier Jean–Marie de Robiano; 23 December 1778; Brussels
- Died: 6 July 1836 (aged 57); Saint-Gilles
- Occupation: politician

Count François Xavier Jean-Marie de Robiano (23 December 1778 – 6 July 1836) was a Belgian politician and art collector. He was the first governor of the province of Antwerp after the independence of Belgium in 1830.

== Political career ==
François de Robiano was a member of the National Congress of Belgium from 1830 until 1831. He was senator in the Belgian Senate from 1831 until 1836 and governor of Antwerp from 4 October 1830 until 7 April 1831.

== Sources ==
- Steve Heylen, Bart De Nil, Bart D’hondt, Sophie Gyselinck, Hanne Van Herck en Donald Weber, Geschiedenis van de provincie Antwerpen. Een politieke biografie, Antwerpen, Provinciebestuur Antwerpen, 2005, Vol. 2 p. 62

Preceded by Alexandre François Ghislain van der Fosse	Governor of Antwerp; 1830–1831	Succeeded by Jean-François Tielemans
