= Synod of Pistoia =

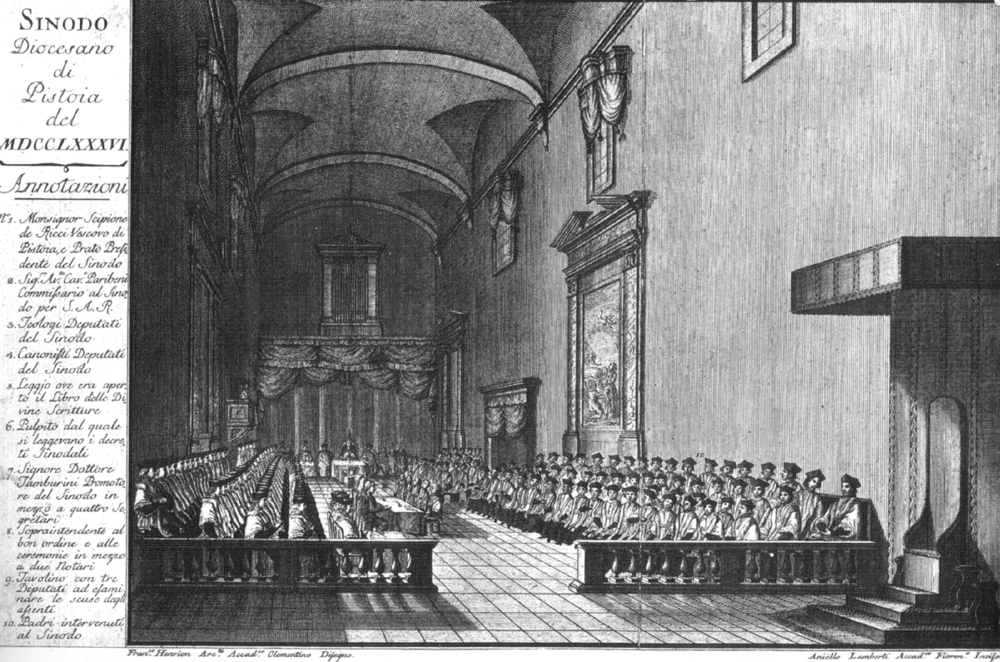
The Synod of Pistoia held in the church of S. Benedetto, Pistoia, 1786.

The Synod of Pistoia was a 1786 diocesan synod in the Catholic diocese of Pistoia, then part of the territory of the Grand Duchy of Tuscany. It was convoked by its bishop Scipione de' Ricci under the patronage and urging of the Habsburg-Lorraine Grand Duke Leopold. The synod adopted a series of decrees of Febronian or Gallican tendency, against the background of Enlightenment thinking. Leopold hoped the synod's resolutions would be taken up by a "national" council and increase state autocratic control over the Church in Tuscany. However, in 1787 a subsequent synod of bishops rejected the Pistoia decrees, and in 1794 Pope Pius VI condemned 85 of them, leading Ricci to recant.

== Circular letter ==
On January 26, 1786 the Grand Duke issued a circular letter to the bishops of Tuscany, suggesting certain "reforms", especially in the matter of the revival of the holding of diocesan synods, the purging of the missals and breviaries of legends, the assertion of episcopal as against papal authority, the curtailing of the privileges of the monastic orders, and improved education for the clergy.

In spite of the hostile attitude of the great majority of the Tuscan bishops, on July 31, 1786 Bishop de Ricci issued a summons to a diocesan synod, which was solemnly opened on the September 18. In convoking the synod, he invoked the authority of Pius VI, who had previously recommended a synod as the normal means of diocesan renewal. It was attended by 233 beneficed secular priests and 13 regulars and decided with practical unanimity on a series of decrees which, had it been possible to carry them into effect, would have involved drastic changes in the Tuscan Church on the lines advocated by Febronius.

== Decrees ==
The first decree (Decretum de fide et ecclesia) declared that the Catholic Church had no right to introduce new dogmas, but only to preserve in its original purity the faith once delivered by Christ to His apostles, and was infallible only so far as it conforms to Holy Scripture and true tradition; the Church, moreover was a purely spiritual body and had no authority in things secular. Other decrees denounced the supposed abuse of indulgences, of festivals of saints, and of processions and proposed revised regulations; others again enjoined the closing of shops on Sunday during divine service, the introduction of the vernacular tongue into the Roman Rite, the issue of editions of liturgical texts for the devotional use of the people that had parallel translations in the vernacular, and recommended the abolition of all monastic orders except that of St. Benedict, the rules of which were to be brought into harmony with modern ideas; nuns were to be forbidden to take vows before the age of 40. The last of the decrees proposed the convocation of a national council.

Overall, the synod's measures incorporated demands made previously by the Jansenist party, opposing for example devotion to the Sacred Heart, though the synod cannot be said to have been Jansenist in essence. Some of its proposals had already been Church law for centuries, others were moderate pastoral measures, others concerned matters well beyond the authority of any diocesan body and others were in any case more in the nature of "fillers" to make up a heady and high-sounding revolutionary manifesto. The driving force was the Habsburg-Lorraine dynasty, as was evident to the clergy faced with the synod's draft proposals, who understandably took discretion to be the better part of valour. Bishop Ricci seized his moment, and seems to have adhered with enthusiasm to the event, but at the same time he had limited choice given the domination of the absolutist regime in Tuscany, a small state, but backed by the international power wielded by the Habsburg-Lorrainers.

== Assembly in Florence ==
The synod's decrees were issued together with a pastoral letter of Bishop Ricci, and were warmly approved by the Grand Duke, at whose instance a "national" synod of the Tuscan bishops met at Florence on April 23, 1787. At this point, however, the plan stalled. The temper of this new assembly, like its composition, was wholly different. The bishops refused to allow a voice to any not of their own order, and in the end the decrees of Pistoia were supported by only three bishops.

Notwithstanding, as a propaganda tool in an ideological war, the acts of the synod of Pistoia were published in Latin and Italian at Pavia in 1788.

Pius VI commissioned four bishops, assisted by theologians of the secular clergy, to examine the Pistoia resolutions, and deputed a congregation of cardinals and bishops to pass judgment on them. These condemned the synod and declared eighty-five of its propositions to be erroneous and dangerous. The synod's teachings were finally condemned by the papal bull Auctorem fidei of August 28, 1794. De' Ricci, deprived of the personal support of the Grand Duke (who had in the meantime become Holy Roman Emperor Leopold II), under pressure from Rome, and threatened with mob violence as a suspected destroyer of holy relics, resigned his see in 1791, and lived in Florence as a private gentleman until his death. In May 1805, upon the return of Pope Pius VII from Paris, he signed an act of submission to papal authority.

== Legacy ==
The Melkite Greek Catholic Church held a synod at Qarqafe Monastery in Beirut in 1806 which ratified and adapted the Synod of Pistoia for the Melkite church. Most of the synod fathers subsequently renounced their ratification of the propositions of the synod and in 1835, Pope Gregory XVI formally condemned them.
