= Matilde Malenchini =

Italian painter

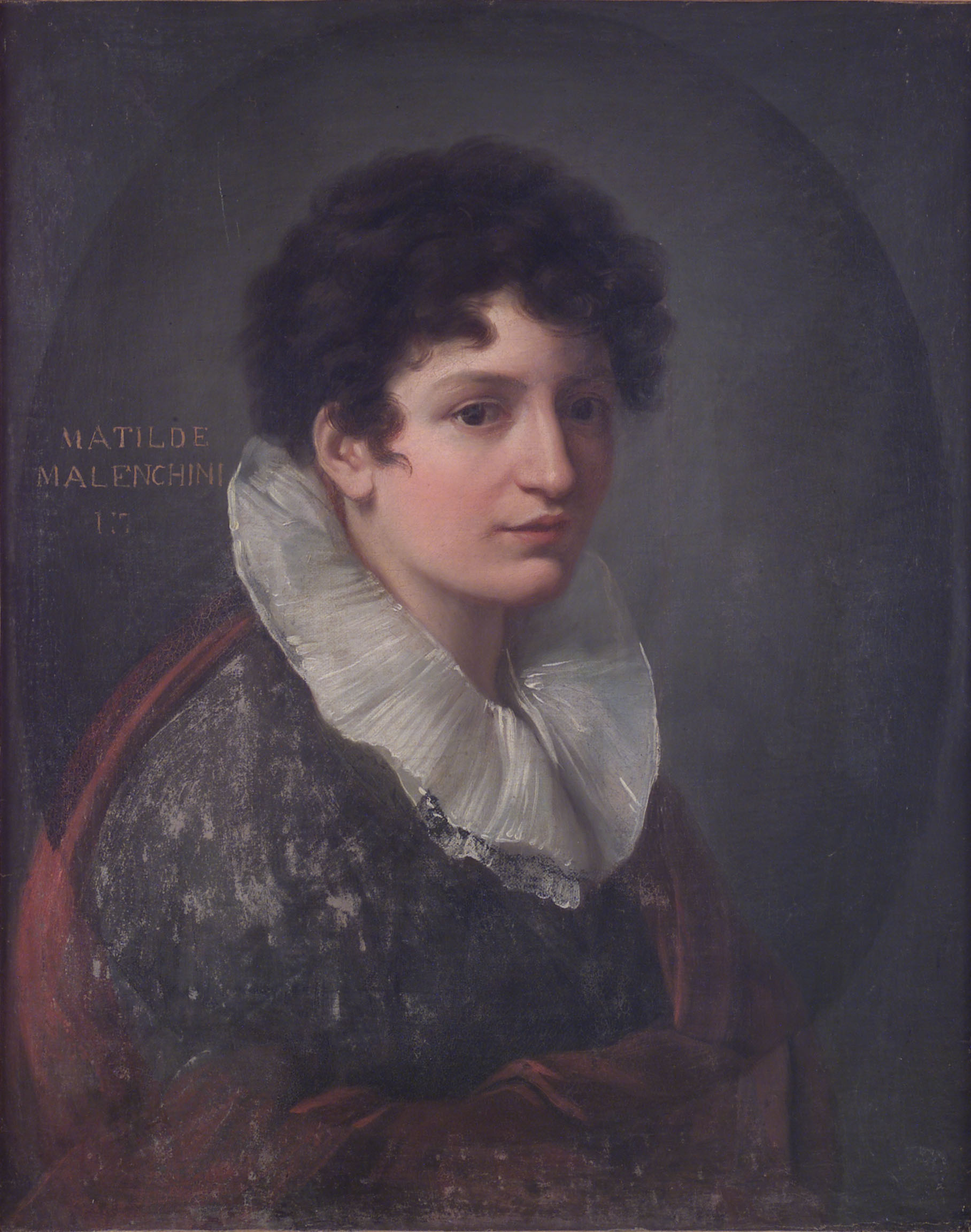
Matilde Malenchini; portrait by Vincenzo Camuccini (c.1815)

Matilde Malenchini, née Meoni (3 December 1779 – 8 September 1858) was an Italian portrait and genre painter in the Academic style.

== Biography ==
She was born in Livorno. In 1796, she married Vincenzo Francesco Malenchini, a painter and musician. Although they soon separated, she retained his name for the rest of her life. In 1807, she entered the Accademia di Belle Arti di Firenze, where she studied under the guidance of Pietro Benvenuti. During these years, for practice and for pay, she copied the works by old Italian and Dutch masters at the Uffizi Gallery. In 1811, she received a four-year annual stipend from Elisa Bonaparte to study in Rome at the "Pontificia Accademia romana delle belle arti di San Luca".

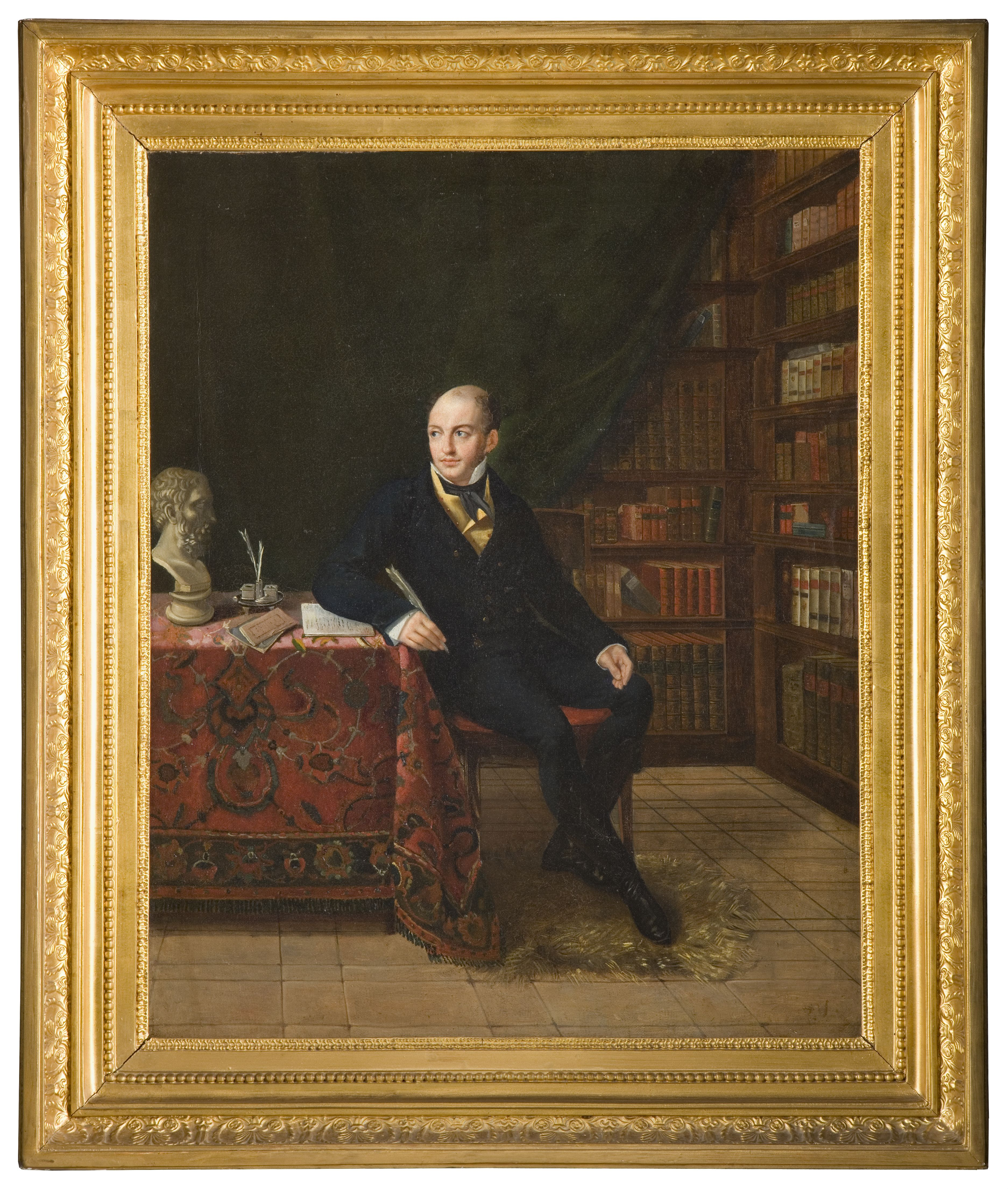
Portrait of Louis de Potter

While there, she made the acquaintance of the French Governor of the Papal States, General François de Miollis, who was also an art collector. He eventually purchased eighteen of her works and helped her establish a studio in the convent of Trinità dei Monti. She focused on painting church interiors and worked with scholarship students from the Académie Française who were living at the Villa Medici. In 1815, she was named a "Professor of Merit" at the Accademia di San Luca.

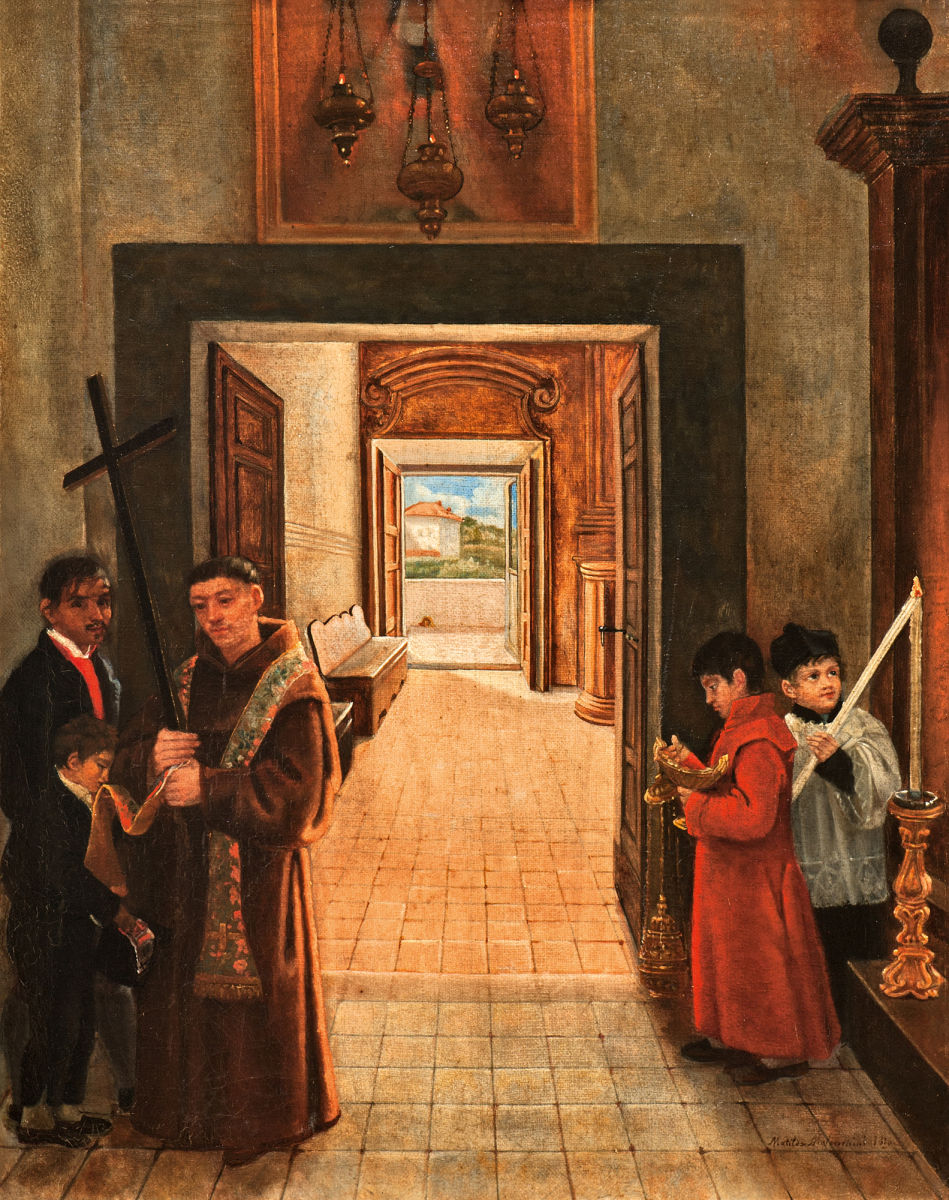
Monastery Interior

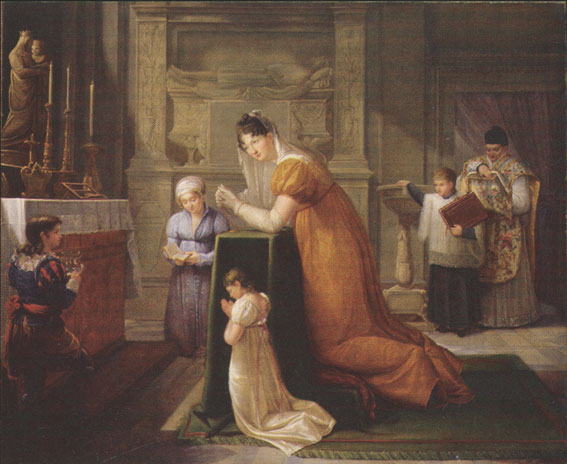
Alexandrine de Bleschamp in the Church at Canino

=== Louis de Potter ===
She also met the Belgian writer Louis de Potter, with whom she had a long and intense relationship. From 1817 to 1819, they both shared a home with the painter François-Joseph Navez. They attempted to obtain an annulment of her previous marriage by appealing to the Roman Curia, but their requests coincided with some scandalous trials involving monks and nuns, which made the Curia unusually cautious. To complicate matters, her husband, who supported the request, had problems with the police.

In 1820, Matilde was forced to leave Rome and settled in Florence. The following year, she was named an Honorary Professor at the Accademia. De Potter returned to Bruges in 1823 to attend to his ailing father. In 1824, after his father's death, De Potter moved to Brussels and invited Malenchini to join him. Their home became a meeting place for expatriate Italians and political refugees. Together with their friend Navez, they organized painting classes. He also became a prominent advocate for Belgian independence.

She soon became restless, travelled continuously, and finally returned to Florence. De Potter, frustrated at being unable to marry, decided to end the relationship in 1826. The following year, he married Sophie van Weydeveldt (1808–1896), with whom he had four children. Realizing that this would leave her in serious financial difficulties, he agreed to give her an annual pension of 1,200 Francs.

=== Final years ===
Due to De Potter's political problems, including 18 months in prison for a pamphlet denouncing King William I and exile in Germany, the pension was unsteady until after the Belgian Revolution when De Potter became a member of the Provisional Government. She turned to painting portraits as a way of making up the difference. There was no contact between them until 1854, following the death of his son Eleuthère, when he wrote her an affectionate letter.

In 1855, at the age of seventy-six, she was accused of pushing one of her maids out of a window when the maid was caught stealing. She was defended by the noted lawyer, Vincenzo Salvagnoli, but was sentenced to three and a half years of detention. The ruling was overturned shortly after, but reinstated in 1857. One of her last paintings depicts the interior of the prison in Florence. She died in 1858 in Fiesole.
