= Etienne de Sauvage =

Politician in Belgium's transition to independence

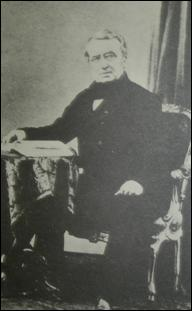
Etienne de Sauvage

Etienne de Sauvage (24 December 1789 – 24 August 1867) was a liberal politician in Belgium and supporter of the early 19th century unionism in Belgium movement.

== Biography ==
In 1829 de Sauvage was vice president of the Association constitutionnelle, as the citizens moved toward the August 1830 start of the Belgian Revolution. In September 1830 he became a member of the commission of public safety of Liège, then became governor of Liège Province. The regent Erasme Louis Surlet de Chokier asked him to form independent Belgium's second government. Sauvage asked Joseph Lebeau to form this government, going against the wishes of the Francophile regent (Lebeau had become known for fighting against Prince Louis, Duke of Nemours' candidature in the National Congress of Belgium). Sauvage left Lebeau to head this government, though Sauvage was minister of the interior in it. He was again minister of the interior in Felix de Muelenaere's government until 3 August 1831, when he was replaced by Charles de Brouckère. The government made Sauvage president of the chamber to the Court of Cassation on 4 October 1832, forcing him to resign as an MP.
