= Charitas (encyclical) =

1791 brief by Pope Pius VI

Charitas quae Latin for 'Charity, which' Papal brief of Pope Pius VI
- Signature date: 13 April 1791
- Subject: Condemnation of the Civil Constitution of the Clergy
- Text: In Latin

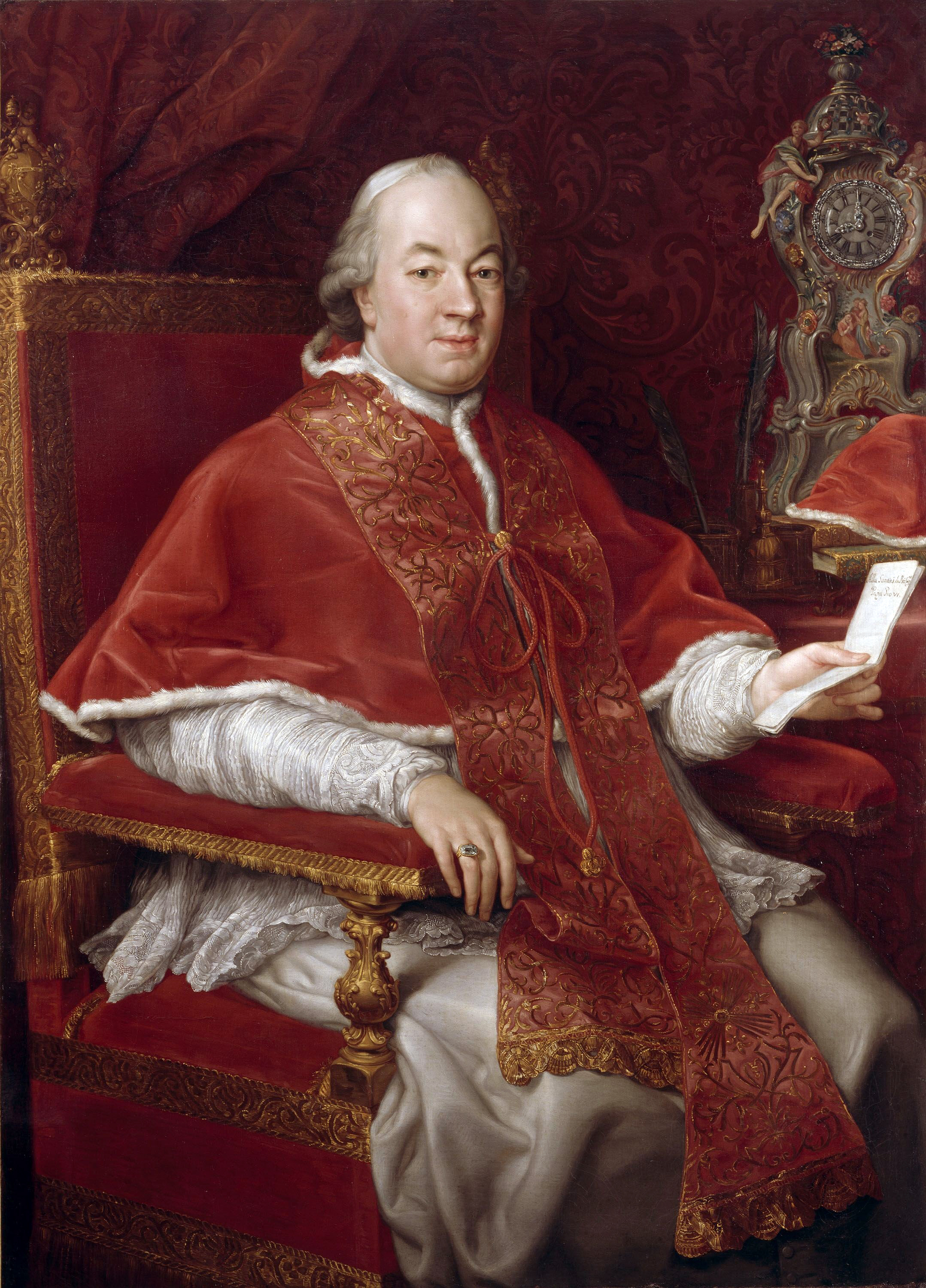
Pope Pius VI

Charitas is a papal brief issued by Pope Pius VI on 13 April 1791 that condemned the Civil Oath adopted by the French National Assembly. It declared that those bishops who had taken the Civil Oath were schismatics and were suspended from their duties unless they recanted the Oath within forty days. This created rival "constitutional" and "refractory" churches. The encyclical also condemned the loss of church lands and the confiscation of revenues such as tithes and annates. It also praised the non-jurors.

Pius wrote:

We call upon you to witness, however, in the name of the Lord, beloved sons, Catholics who in the kingdom of the Gauls are united, being mindful of your religion and the faith of your fathers, we counsel you from the innermost feelings of our heart lest you secede from it, inasmuch as it is the one and the true religion, which bestows eternal life and protects citizens, even societies, and makes them prosperous. Take special care lest you proffer ears to the insidious voices of this secular sect, whose voices furnish death, and avoid in this way all usurpers whether they are called archbishops, bishops or parish priests, so that there is nothing in common between you and them, especially in divine matters...in one word, cling to us: for no-one can be in the Church of Christ unless he is unified with the visible head of the Church itself and is strengthened in the cathedral of Peter.

The National Assembly responded to this encyclical by issuing the "Decree on Publication of Papal Communications" (9 June 1791) that prohibited the publication of papal dispatches.
