= Paul Devaux =

Belgian politician (1801–1880)

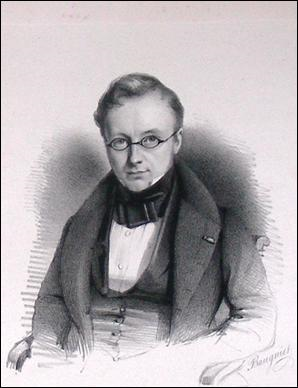
Paul Devaux

Paul Devaux (10 April 1801 – 30 January 1880) was a liberal Belgian revolutionary politician and historian.

== Life ==
Devaux was born on 10 April 1801 in Bruges.

He began life as a lawyer in Liège, where he met Joseph Lebeau and Charles Rogier, with whom he refounded the Matthieu Lansbergh (later renamed le Politique) as a pro-unionist publication. Elected to the National Congress of Belgium, he and Lebeau defended the candidature of Auguste de Beauharnais, 2nd Duke of Leuchtenberg against that of Prince Louis, Duke of Nemours. In 1831 he took part in Lebeau's cabinet as minister without portfolio – it was Devaux who suggested Leopold of Saxe-Coburg-Gotha as a candidate for the throne of Belgium.

Devaux died on 30 January 1880 in Brussels. A road in Brussels is named after him.
