= Thomas H. McKittrick =

American banker (1889–1970)

Thomas McKittrick

President of the Bank for International Settlements
- In office January 1940 – June 1946
- Chair: Otto Niemeyer; Ernst Weber
- General Manager: Roger Auboin
- Preceded by: Johan Beyen
- Succeeded by: Maurice Frère (1948)

Personal details
- Born: April 14, 1889 St. Louis, Missouri, U.S.
- Died: January 21, 1970 (aged 80) Newton, New Jersey, U.S.
- Education: Harvard University (BA); St. Louis University (LLB)

Thomas Harrington McKittrick (1889–1970) was an American banker and president of the Bank for International Settlements during World War II whose close relationship with Hitler's Third Reich has stirred controversy.

== Career ==
McKittrick was educated at Harvard University and graduated in 1911. He joined the National City Bank in 1916, assigned to assist in opening a branch of the bank in Geneva, Switzerland. He served in the American Expeditionary Force during World War I. In the interwar years he was a banker with Lee, Higginson & Co.

McKittrick was president of the Bank for International Settlements (BIS) from 1940 to June 1943, under the chairmanship of Otto Niemeyer and Ernst Weber. BIS, intended to facilitate effective monetary co-operation, declared its neutrality in World War II. After the war was declared in September 1939, it was no longer possible for representatives of Germany, France or the United Kingdom to attend BIS meetings. Due to the commencement of hostilities in France, only a few miles from BIS headquarters in Basel, Switzerland, McKittrick was the only member of its assembly to attend the May 1940 annual meeting.

McKittrick was a family friend of Allen Dulles, a US intelligence officer also based in Switzerland during World War II. Dulles later became a Director of the Central Intelligence Agency.

In 1941, Fortune magazine claimed that Germany had gained control of BIS by purchasing shares from other shareholders. McKittrick denied allegations that the bank was being used to escape the foreign funds controls put in place by the US Government against the Axis powers. During World War II BIS received gold as interest payments from the German Reichstag which later investigations showed had been looted from the central banks of Belgium and the Netherlands. McKittrick was re-elected to the post of president of the BIS in 1942.

From 1946 to 1954, McKittrick worked for the Chase National Bank, becoming a senior vice president and director. He headed a survey mission for the International Bank for Reconstruction and Development to India in the 1950s. He died on January 21, 1970, aged 90, in Newton, New Jersey.

== Archives and records ==
- Thomas H. McKittrick papers at Baker Library Special Collections, Harvard Business School.

Diplomatic posts
Preceded by Johan Beyen	President of the Bank for International Settlements; 1940–1946	Vacant Title next held by Maurice Frère
