= Hubert Ansiaux =

Hubert Ansiaux (24 November 1908 – 9 April 1987) was a governor of the National Bank of Belgium (NBB) from 1957 until 1971.

After he graduated from the Solvay Business School, he joined the National Bank of Belgium in 1935. Before the outbreak of World War II, he accompanied the evacuation of the NBB’s last consignment of assets to England, thereby safeguarding the assets of the NBB from the Nazis.

In 1941 Hubert Ansiaux left for the United States of America, and in the same year he was appointed as director in London, where he was to succeed Camille Gutt. In London, he was in charge of the practical management of the Bank in London, together with Adolphe Baudewyns. After the war, he was in charge of the NBB's Foreign Affairs department and he was closely involved in the post-war currency reform (Operation Gutt).

Hubert Ansiaux supported the European integration, and from 1947 up to 1955 he was president of the Intra-European Payments Committee which had been created within the Organisation for European Economic Cooperation and served on the board of directors of the European Payments Union from 1950 up to 1955.

From 1944 to 1954 he worked as deputy administrator at the Bank for International Settlements, and in 1946 he became administrator of the International Bank for Reconstruction and Development. Hubert Ansiaux was involved in setting up the International Monetary Fund where he would later advocate the creation of the special drawing rights.

Ansiaux was appointed as vice-governor of the NBB in 1954, and as its governor in 1957. He held the position of central banker during the sixties, until the collapse of the Bretton Woods system in 1971.

As governor of the NBB Ansiaux continued to play a leading role in European monetary cooperation. In 1967 he was appointed as president of the Committee of Governors of the Central Banks of the Member States of the EEC. In 1970 he contributed to the Werner Report with the first plans for Economic and Monetary Union. Ansiaux resigned, after a conflict with the government, as governor of the NBB in 1971.

== Sources ==
- Letter from Hubert Ansiaux to Paul van Zeeland (Brussels, 27 March 1950)
- Organization for European Economic Cooperation, International Organization, Vol. 4, No. 3 (Aug., 1950), pp. 520–528
- België en zijn buitlandse politiek 1830 - 1990, Van Halewyck • 1998 • ISBN 90-5617-136-4
- Kurgan–van Henteryk Ginette, (1997), “Hubert Ansiaux”, in Nouvelle Biographie Nationale, Académie Royale des Sciences, des Lettres et des Beaux-Arts de Belgique, vol. 4, pp. 11–13.
- Van Der Wee, Herman et Monique Verbreyt "A Small Nation in the Turmoil of the Second World War: Money, Finance and Occupation (Belgium, its Enemies, its Friends, 1939-1945)". Leuven, Leuven University Press, 2009. 494 pp. ISBN 978-90-5867-759-4.

Preceded by Maurice Frère	Governor of the National Bank of Belgium; 1957–1971	Succeeded by Robert Vandeputte
