= European Monetary Agreement =

European agreement establishing a multilateral financial settlement system

- Duration: 17 years
- Motive: European economic integration
- Outcome: Currency convertibility across Europe

The European Monetary Agreement (EMA) was an economic arrangement signed by 17 European countries in Paris on the 5th of August 1955. It replaced the European Payments Union which ended in 1958. The EMA was administered by the Organisation for Economic Co-operation and Development (OECD). The OECD did this to achieve economic integration by coordinating the exchange rates of the 17 member countries. This allowed the countries to directly convert their currencies and integrate their balance of payments accounts, which promoted free trade. Due to advanced facilities offered by the International Monetary Fund, the EMA was ended in 1972. The European Economic Community oversaw the EMA aiming to achieve a greater level of economic integration within Europe. The European Economic Community was the legal successor at the time, however it has advanced and is now referred to as the European Union.

== History ==
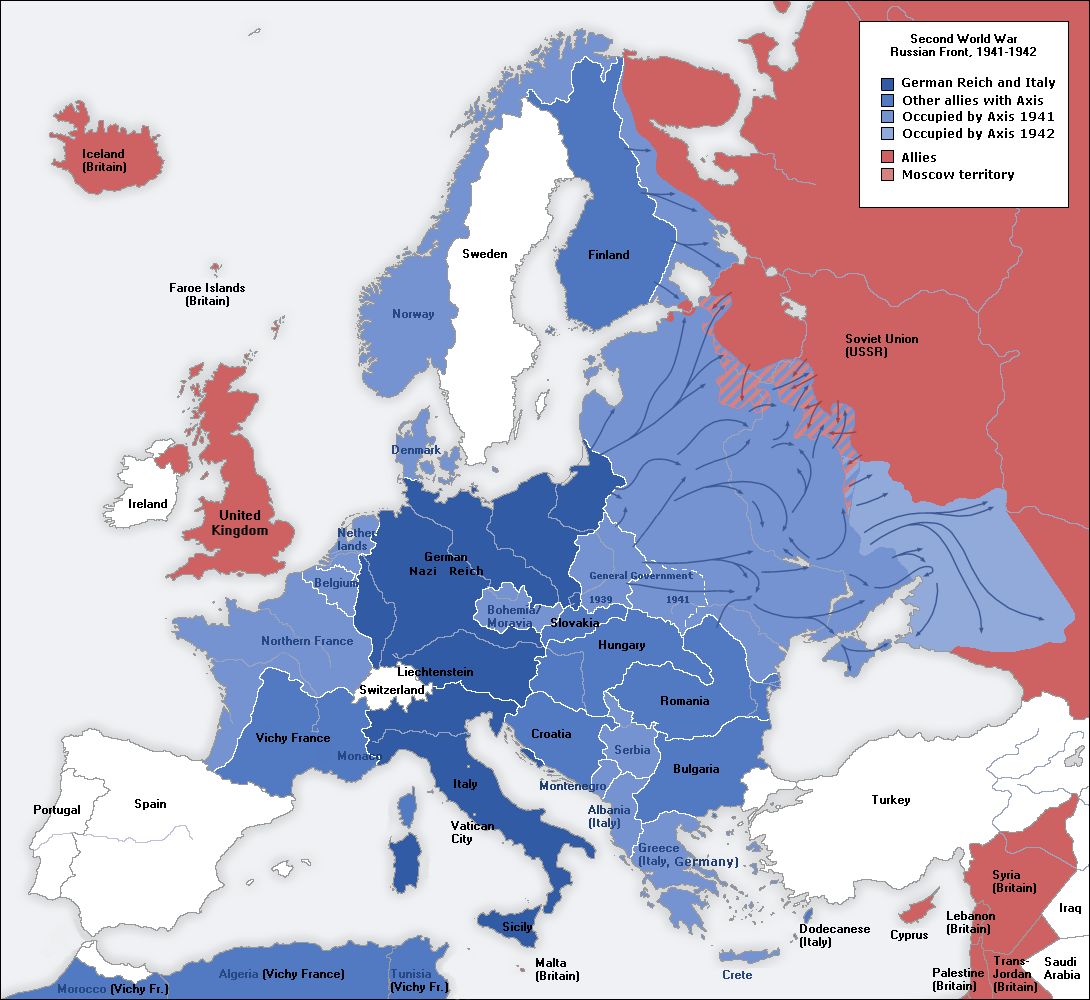
Europe during the Second World War: 1941-1942

Prior to the European Monetary Agreement, the European Payments Union was the agreement in place. This was an organisation which was bilateral in nature, and enabled trade between the European countries through an automatic credit system. The credit system within the framework of the European Payments Union was imposed to make transfers and recognition of credit between countries automatic. There was trade discrimination which still occurred with these features of the European Payments Union, and this resulted in the increased stagnation of intra-European trade. The EMA was implemented following this to boost the trade and economic growth of the member states. This was done in order to rebuild the individual economies within Europe, so that the overall European economy could recover from this situation which had been created by the prior agreements and organisations. One difference that was noticed in the EMA compared with the European Payments Union was greater coordination of individual exchange rates held by each country for monthly settlements. This was instead of using a single exchange rate to cover all countries for settlements. Additionally, the EMA was a multilateral system and allowed a smaller amount of interim finance, a form of short-term borrowing, to be taken between countries in comparison to the European Payments Union. The loan granting as well as the multilateral settlements imposed by the EMA were not automatic or mandatory, which was a new aspect compared to prior organisations. These changes were implemented to achieve currency convertibility and the overarching aim of the EMA.

As a continuation from the European Payments Union, the EMA similarly had a managing board which regularly monitored the developments of the member countries. This was done particularly through individual consultations about their exchange rate policies and balance of payments. From the impact of the European Payments Union, the trade deficit across Europe had recovered and overall trade increased within member countries. As a result of this, the countries also had greater financial stability.

Due to the Second World War, currency convertibility was not an immediate option for most countries as there was a significant imbalance across the global economy. This imbalance was primarily created from the deficit in the current account of Europe following the War. This meant the feat of currency convertibility had to be slowly worked towards over the long-term, as the balance of payments in Europe was impacted by the trade deficit. Currency convertibility was then eventually achieved through the EMA. Prior to the EMA, countries feared they would lose financial reserves if currency convertibility was implemented, and thus this formed part of the debate around the European multilateral convertibility. There was potential for loss of financial reserves as these are used to influence the rate of exchange, which would not have been necessary once currency convertibility was in place.

== Aim ==
There were various goals which were set out to be achieved through the implementation of the European Monetary Agreement, however there was one main aim. The aim of the EMA was to reduce the short-term credit, a form of loans, that was received between the member countries from one another. It was hoped this would be achieved through the changes made when moving from the European Payments Union to the EMA. The EMA was a short-term phase as part of a long-term plan for the economic integration of Europe. It followed previous agreements which were all created to boost the growth and development of the European economy. This was done particularly through trade liberalisation and increased production, following the effects of the Second World War. It was hoped that a high level of trade liberalisation could be maintained between the member countries of the Organisation for Economic Co-operation and Development, even if they did not yet have convertible currencies.

Through the implementation of the EMA, it was intended that this agreement would eventually help Europe move towards an overall monetary union. The EMA was a framework arranged to further progress the work of the European Payments Union, which was responsible for the cooperation of exchange of goods and services between countries. In doing this, the EMA hoped to assist the European Economic Community. It hoped to do this by achieving a fixed exchange rate system, consistent economic policy, and a union where factors of production such as capital and particularly labour were free to move around.

== Economic vs. Political Motivations ==
The journey to economic integration, of which the European Monetary Agreement was a small part, was instigated due to a range of political motivations and historical views. With the decisions and policies implemented, both prior to and during the EMA, there was debate around whether these were inspired by political or economic objectives. The idea of a common institutional framework required the cooperation of individual economic policies as well as the political policies of member governments. This meant that political rivalry across the European countries was lessened, in order to achieve mutual economic cooperation, which also led to increased political integration.

The increased integration formed by the EMA also resulted in a loss of national autonomy and sovereignty for the member governments and their nations. The individual governments within the EMA were required to give up their autonomous use of certain policies, in particular fiscal policy and monetary policy. This element of political integration was required in order for the EMA to achieve unity across the exchange rates and trade policies within Europe. Through the views of economic stakeholders and politicians, as well as events such as the falling of the Berlin Wall and Germany’s recovery from war, Europeans became satisfied with the idea of economic integration in Europe. The European countries were motivated by the prospect of economic recovery following the war. This led to stability and a high degree of coordination of the political policies across the member countries within Europe. There were concerns about the political nature of this integration, and through agreements such as the EMA, the accelerated globalisation and economic growth which could be achieved became clear.

Although, following the economic and political integration that had been implemented within the EMA, there were some countries which preferred a system of only economic integration. In the 1950s following the establishment of the EMA, these countries, including Denmark, the United Kingdom, Sweden, Finland and Austria chose to form their own external free trade areas. These free trade areas were not focused on political integration, rather solely on achieving the economic objectives and policies of the countries. One example was the European Free Trade Association (EFTA). The formation of free trade areas such as EFTA showcased the divide in views between the member nations of the EMA. EFTA also portrayed how each country had different motivations in terms of what they believed was required to achieve economic growth and economic development through integration.

== Impacts ==
=== Economic & Political Repercussions ===
All financial transactions which occurred as a result of the European Monetary Agreement were managed by the Bank for International Settlements. The policy changes made through the EMA established greater currency convertibility for members of the agreement. This enabled currencies of countries within the agreement to be exchanged freely. The impact of currency convertibility was due to the removal of many exchange restrictions as well as the removal of limits on imports. These actions meant that less barriers to trade were in place. This enabled the countries in the agreement to trade with greater freedom, further improving the degree of economic integration across Europe. Due to the economic stability achieved through this level of currency convertibility, high levels of employment and economic growth were achieved both domestically across the member countries, as well as across the overall economy of this agreement.

However, complete currency convertibility within Europe was not achieved until the late 1980s. The EMA was one part of the European Economic Community’s plan, which was to achieve overall economic integration in the long run. The EMA contributed to this through the currency convertibility which established a pathway to a European common currency and a common central bank.

The EMA had short-term impacts, however it also played a role in the final establishment of the European Union. The European Union is the current monetary union which possesses a common currency, the Euro, and demonstrates a high level of cooperation and integration between the member countries. This existence of a common currency and central bank was contributed to by the EMA. This enabled price stability and social protection for the citizens of Europe under a common law. Other than economic integration, the EMA also contributed to an improved level of political unity. This was through the higher level of cooperation it established between governments, particularly with government trade policies. Governments of the member countries were able to cooperate in all trade deals made with non-member countries. Although, this political unity which arose from the high level of integration meant that the individual governments lost policies such as monetary policy as instruments of their own individual economic policy.

=== Successors ===
There have been various successors to the European Monetary Agreement, including the European Monetary System which began in 1979, the Single European Act which started operating in 1987, as well as the Common Agricultural Policy. These also impacted the European economy, in particular through promoting trade and building on the financial credit system developed by the EMA. There continues to be policies and arrangements implemented to continue the development of economic integration within Europe, even though the outcomes of many of the prior policies have already been achieved.

Overtime, economic integration within Europe, including the impacts of the EMA as well as its predecessors and successors, has been referred to as a project which promised different outcomes to three specific generations. It was stated by Benoît Cœuré, Member of the Executive Board of the European Central Bank, that these groups of people were expected to be impacted differently from the European economic integration based on their history and socioeconomic status. For the generation following war, their expectation from this integration was lifelong democracy and peace. The generation from Europe who experienced the falling of the Berlin Wall during their youth were assured they would have greater opportunities and freedom in their life. The other collective of people to be affected by the European integration were European workers impacted by increased global competition and changes in technology. These people were guaranteed there would be both social and economic security to protect them from the increased production worldwide. The third promise is yet to be fulfilled, as since this integration began there have been high levels of unemployment, in particular youth unemployment. Although, the European economic integration following the EMA has led to various developments and continues to be updated under the European Union.
