= Bank for International Settlements =

International financial institution owned by central banks

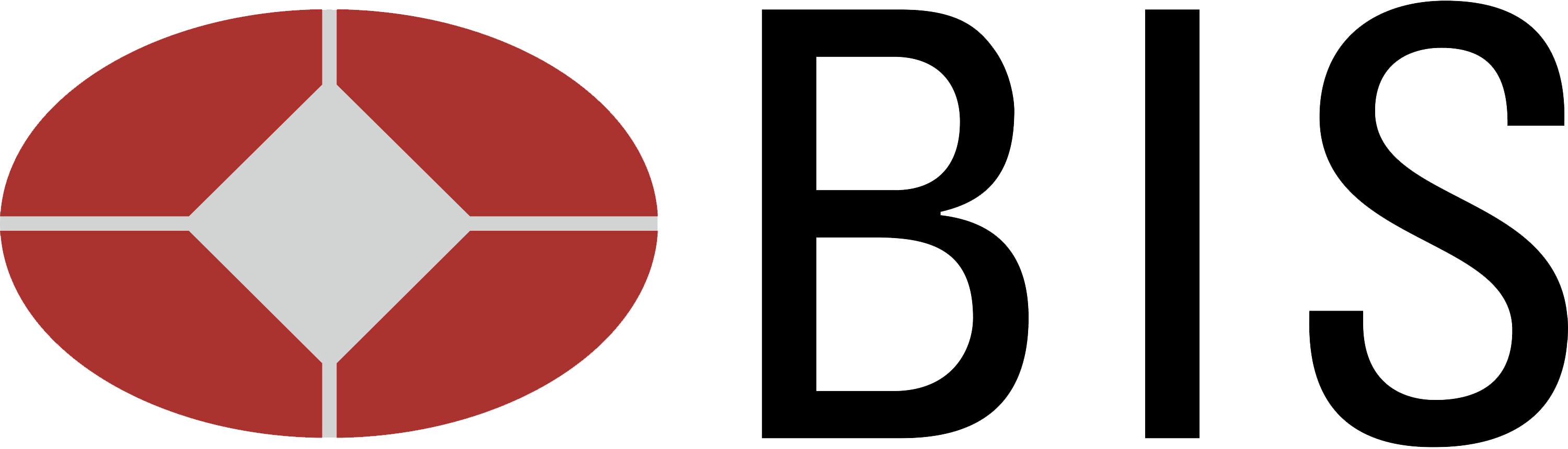

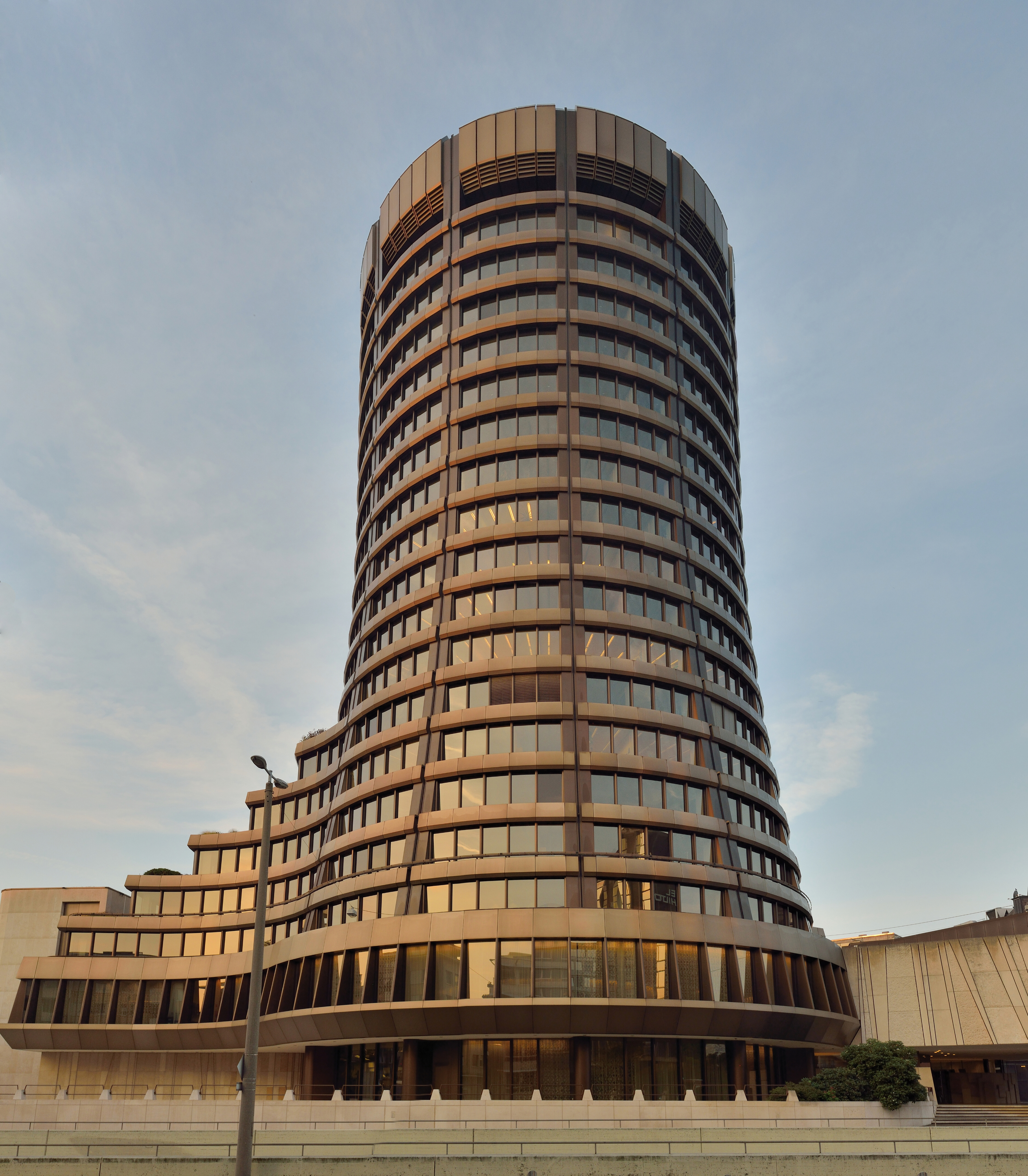
- BIS Tower in Basel

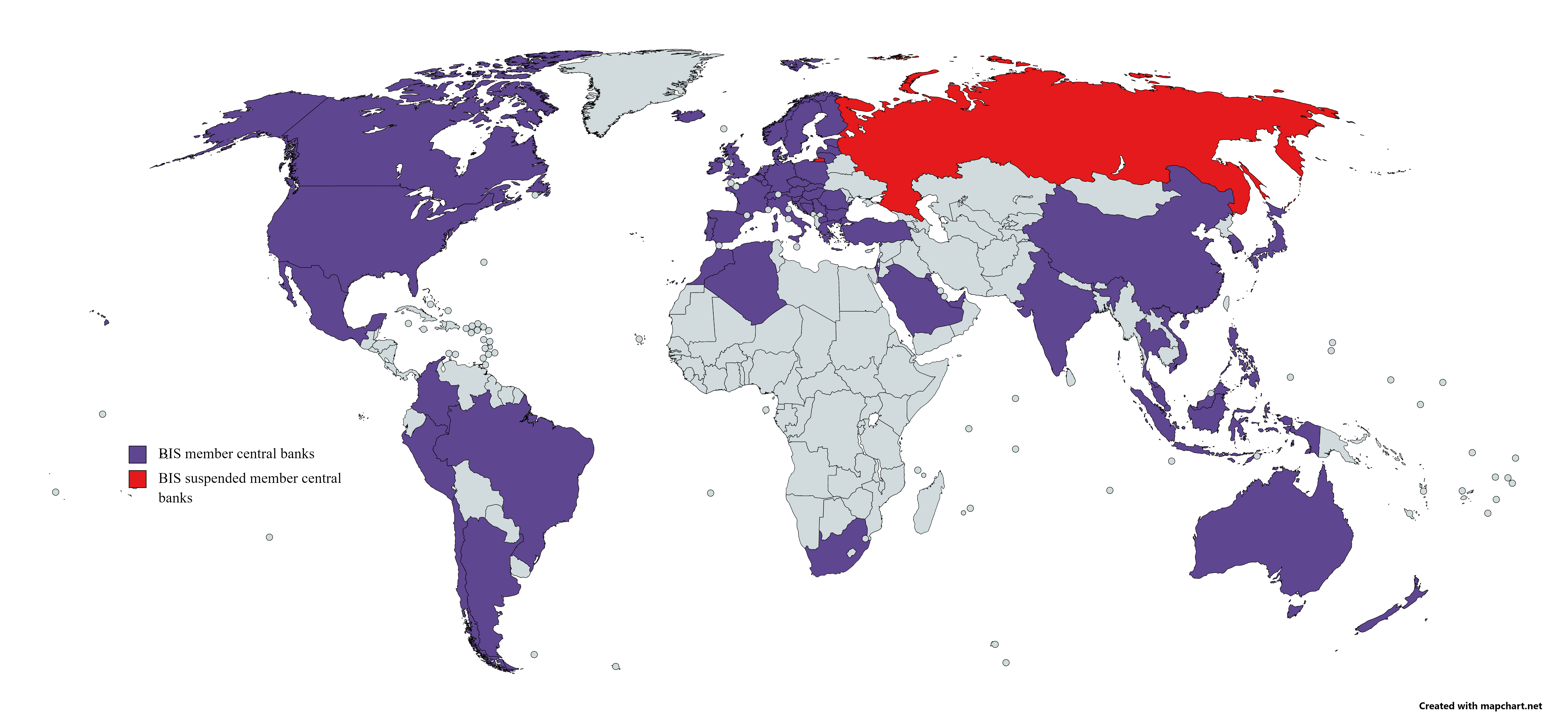
- BIS members
- Established: 17 May 1930; 96 years ago
- Type: International financial institution
- Location: Basel, Switzerland (Extraterritorial jurisdiction)
- Coordinates: 47°32′53″N 7°35′31″E
- Members: Central banks from 63 jurisdictions
- General manager: Pablo Hernández de Cos
- Main organ: Board of directors
- Staff: 1300
- Website: bis.org

The Bank for International Settlements (BIS) is an international financial institution which is owned by members' central banks. Its primary goal is to foster international monetary and financial cooperation while serving as a bank for central banks. With its establishment in 1930 it is the oldest international financial institution. Its initial purpose was to oversee the settlement of World War I war reparations.

The BIS carries out its work through its meetings, programmes and through the Basel Process, hosting international groups pursuing global financial stability and facilitating their interaction. It also provides banking services to central banks, monetary authorities and international organizations.

The BIS is based in Basel, Switzerland, with representative offices in Hong Kong and Mexico City.

== History ==
=== Background ===
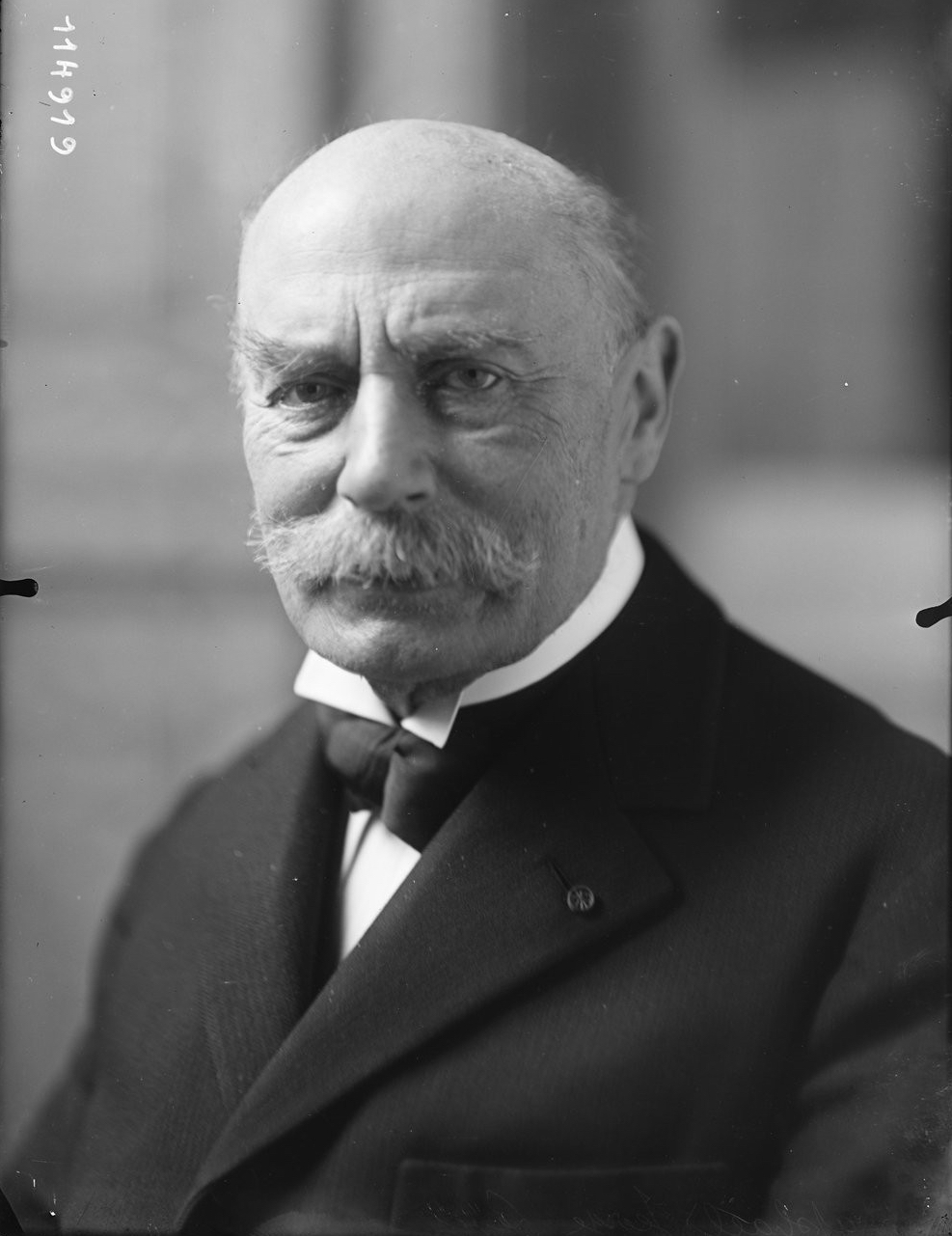
French economist Raphaël-Georges Lévy (1853–1933) was a precocious proponent of an international bank, for which he suggested a location in Switzerland.

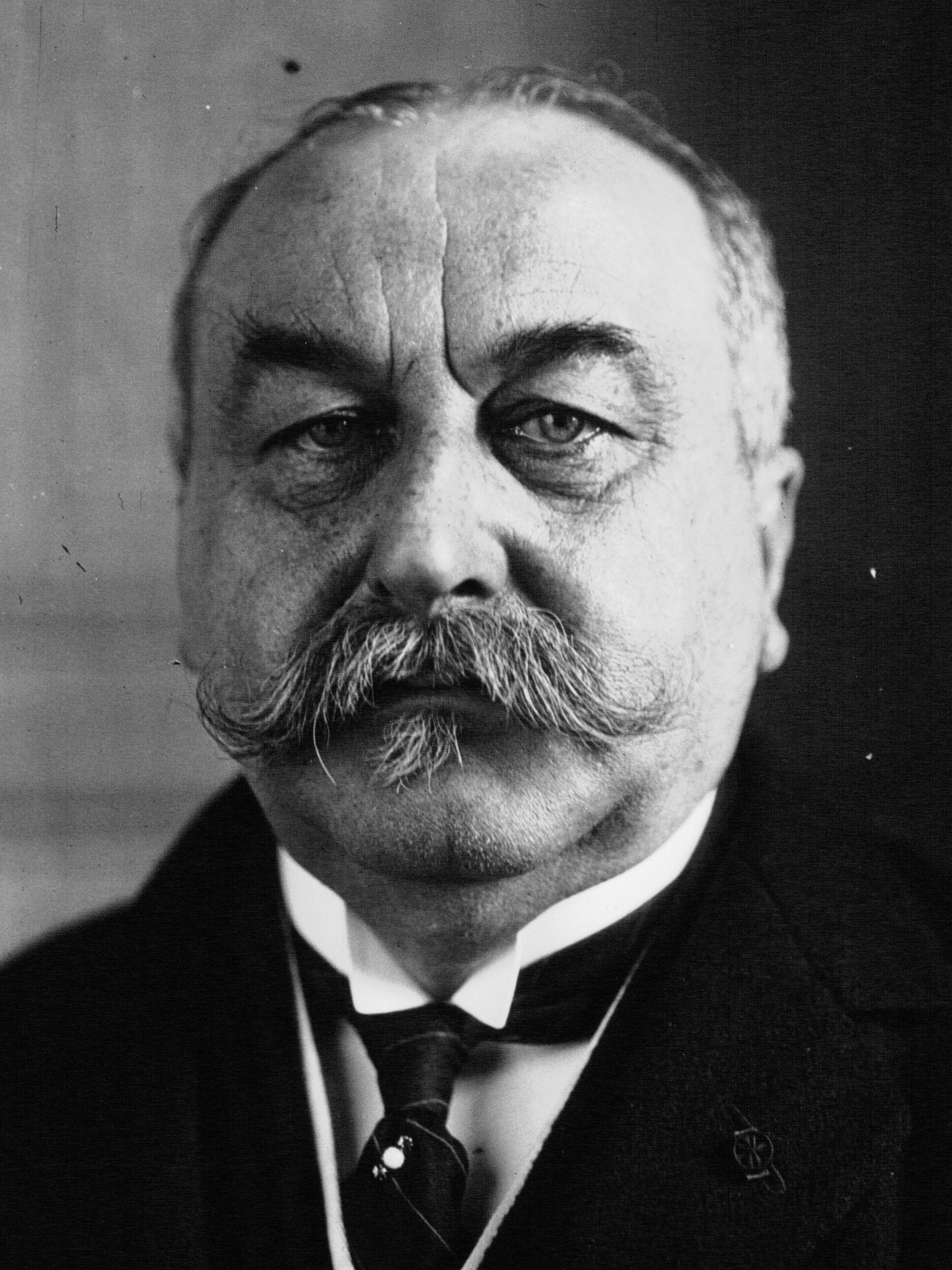
Belgian statesman Léon Delacroix (1867–1929) was an early promoter of the BIS and died during the negotiations to create it.

International monetary cooperation started to develop tentatively in the course of the 19th century. An early case was a £400,000 loan in gold coins, in 1825 and facilitated by the Rothschilds, from the Bank of France to the Bank of England, which was facing a bank run. The Bank of England again borrowed from its French counterpart (and from the Hamburger Bank) in 1836 and 1839, and lent to it in return in 1847.

In 1860–1861, because of the disruption from the incipient American Civil War, the Bank of France entered a series of swap agreements in specie with the Bank of England as well as the State Bank of the Russian Empire and De Nederlandsche Bank. That episode was recorded as the "war of the banks", ostensibly because of friction between the Bank of France and the Bank of England about the transaction.

A few years later, monetary cooperation took a novel form with a series of international monetary conferences devoted to better coordination of the coinage system, even though these initiatives, like the Latin Monetary Union started in 1865, did not extend to money other than coins, and therefore involved treasury and mint officials rather than bankers.

At the Brussels Conference in 1892, German academic Julius Wolff submitted a blueprint for an international currency that would be used for emergency lending to national central banks and would be issued by an institution based in a neutral country. In 1893, French economist Raphaël-Georges Lévy suggested the establishment of an international central bank in Bern.

In 1907, Italian statesman Luigi Luzzatti published an article in the Austrian Neue Freie Presse, referencing past examples of bilateral cooperation between central banks and emphasizing the need for more institutionalized cooperation at the international level.

The practice of formalized central bank cooperation made unprecedented advances among allies in the course of World War I. In 1916, the Bank of England and Bank of France made agreements on bilateral lending and established a direct telegraph line between their respective offices to facilitate communication. Similar formal agreements were made that year between those two banks and the Federal Reserve Bank of New York, and in 1917 the Bank of Italy opened an office in New York.

In the war's immediate aftermath, Dutch central banker Gerard Vissering advocated an international currency without reliance on a common gold pool. Similar ideas burgeoned at the Brussels Conference of 1920, the first major discussion of international financial challenges following the war, endorsed by luminaries such as Belgian prime minister Léon Delacroix and American banker Frank A. Vanderlip, who suggested reorganizing Europe's national central banks along similar lines to the U.S. Federal Reserve which he had helped establish in the previous decade. At the Genoa Conference of 1922, following advocacy by several experts that included Ralph Hawtrey, Robert Horne and John Maynard Keynes, a resolution was passed that recommended the creation of "an association or permanent understanding for cooperation amongst central banks, not necessarily limited to Europe, to coordinate credit policies, without detriment to the freedom of each individual central bank."

It was decided to create the BIS in the context of negotiations over World War I reparations which plagued international relations in Europe throughout the 1920s. Following the Treaty of Versailles, a Reparation Commission was set up in January 1920 to determine the amount of German reparations. Conferences at Spa in July 1920 and London in March 1921 were followed by the occupation of the Ruhr in January 1923, and eventually the Dawes Plan approved at another London conference in July–August 1924. The Dawes Plan allowed for a more constructive atmosphere, materialized in diplomacy by the Locarno Treaties in October 1925 and encouraging Montagu Norman, the influential governor of the Bank of England, to envisage the creation of what he described in September 1925 as "a private and eclectic Central Banks' 'Club', small at first, larger in the future." That vision was first materialized at a meeting in early July 1927 which brought together Montagu, his friend Benjamin Strong, head of the Federal Reserve Bank of New York, Reichsbank president Hjalmar Schacht, and Bank of France vice governor Charles Rist at a private home on Long Island (the Bank of Italy had hoped for an invitation but was not included). A second meeting was scheduled in Algeciras, but was not held because of the bad health of Strong, who eventually died in October 1928.

=== The Young Plan and the Hague Conference ===
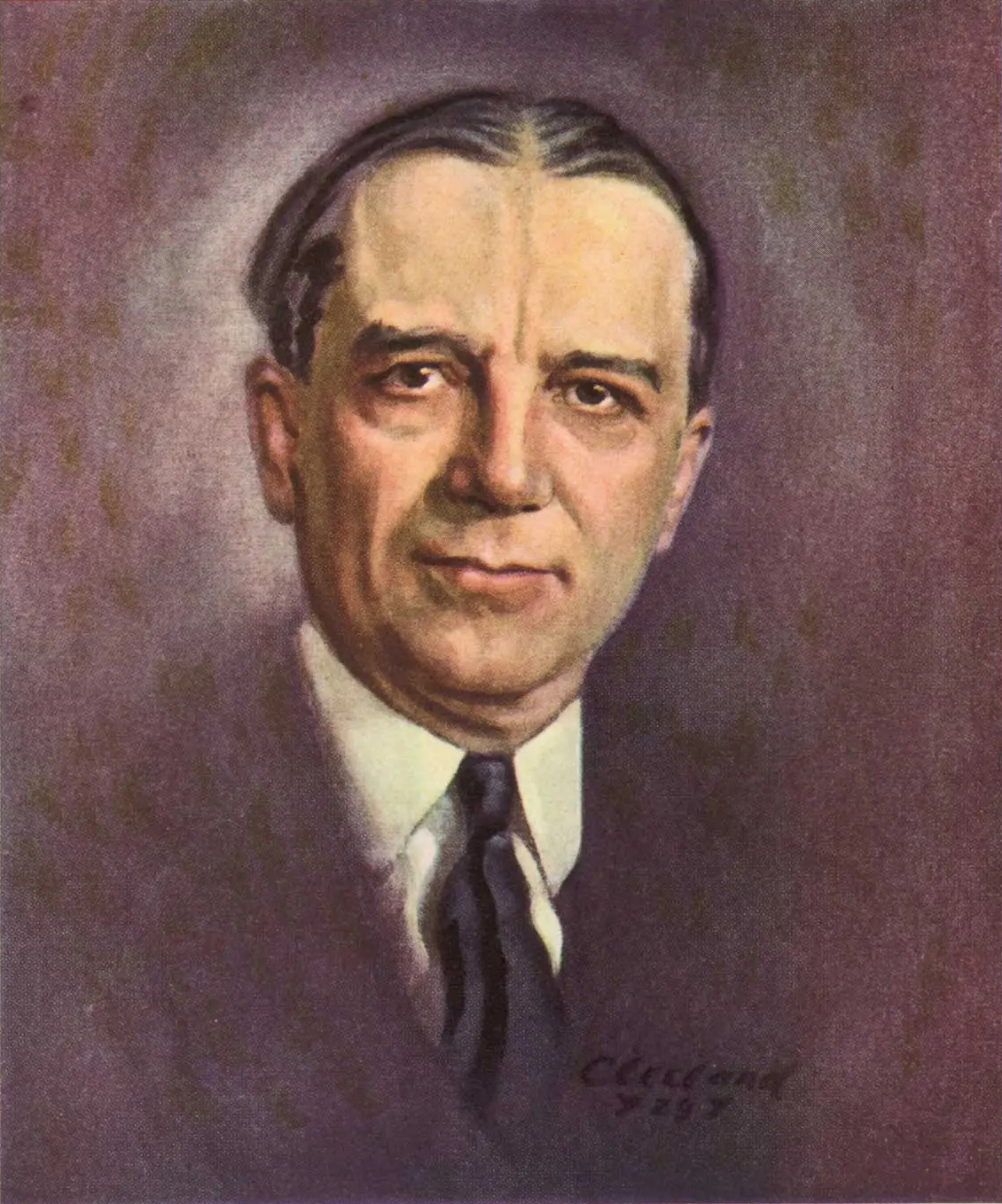
American banker Owen D. Young (1874–1962) played a central role in the conception and establishment of the BIS in 1929–1930

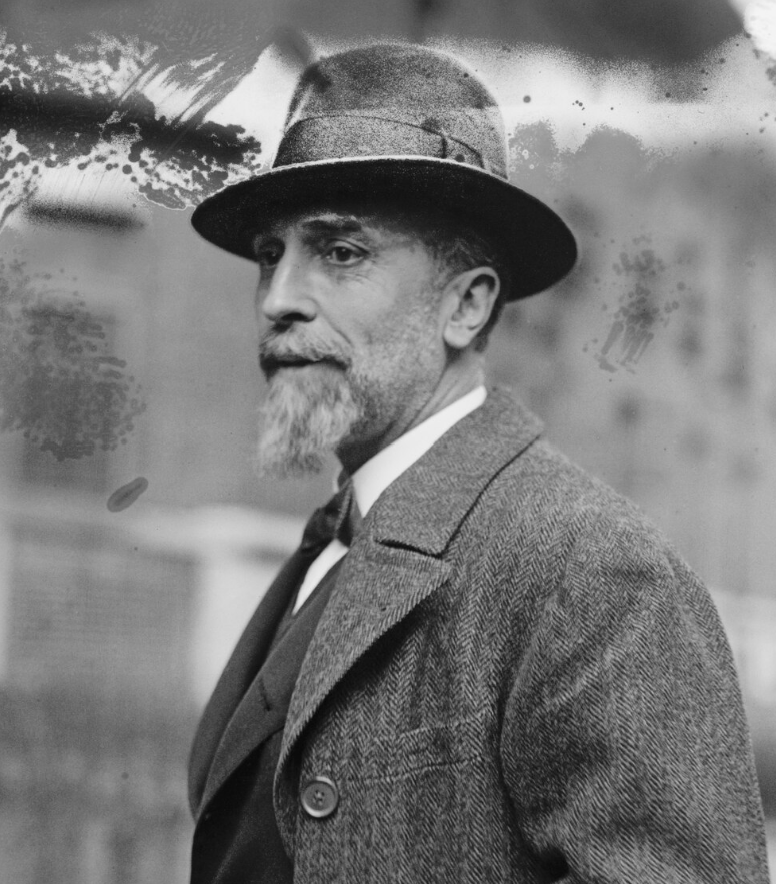
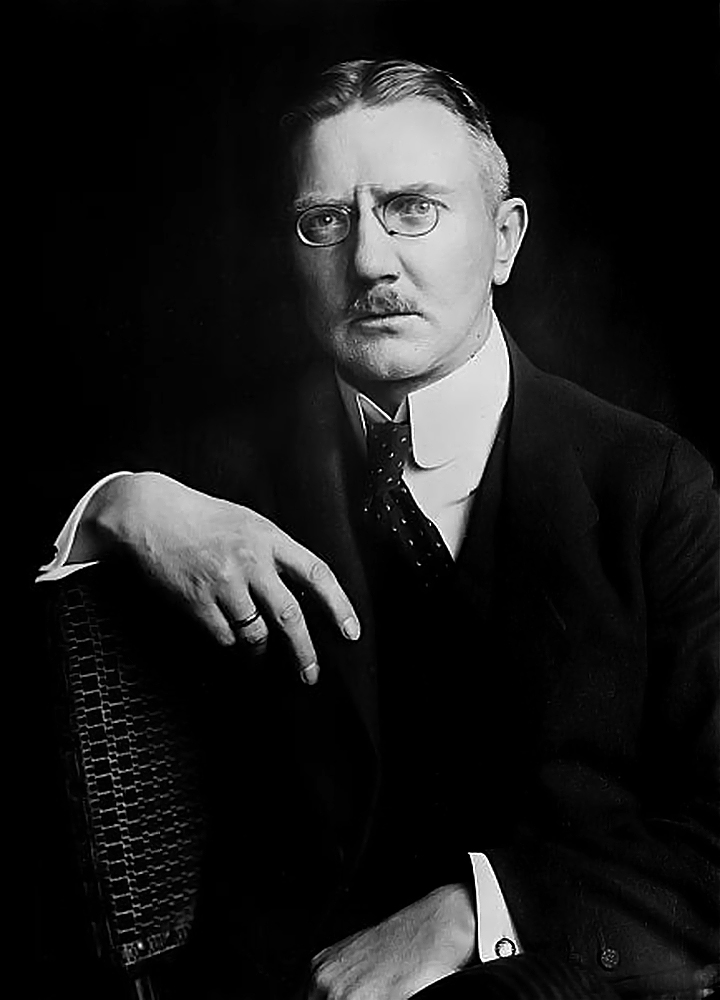
Central bankers Montagu Norman (for the UK) and Hjalmar Schacht (for Germany) were the most prominent protagonists of BIS meetings during most of the 1930s

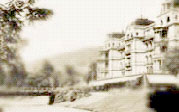
Hôtel Stéphanie in Baden-Baden (demolished in 1964), where the charter and statutes of the BIS were drafted

A deadline for French repayment of its bilateral debt to the United States provided impetus for a new initiative, which took the form of a Committee of Experts appointed to work out a final settlement of the German reparations, known as the Young Committee for its chairman the American banker Owen D. Young. The committee first met at the Bank of France on 9 February 1929, then in 28 successive sessions ending on 7 June 1929 at the Hotel George V. The seven participating countries were Belgium, France, Germany, Italy, Japan, the United Kingdom and the United States. The need for a jointly governed bank emerged in these discussions as a means to overcome information asymmetries and increase the likelihood that commitments would be effectively met, not least by helping the creditors to act collectively and facilitating the reinvestment of German payments into the German economy. The first draft concept for the new bank was presented by Belgian banker Émile Francqui on 23 February 1929, and amended with suggestions from Bank of France governor Émile Moreau. It was envisaged as a private institution with shareholders from all participating countries (including Germany) that would settle reparation payments, issue bonds to be serviced by the reparation transfers, and (as advocated by Schacht) provide international long-term credit for countries in need, including Germany. In a memo to Young a few days later, Schacht first used the name "International Settlements Bank" while referring to the projected new institution. Young asked his American peers Warren Randolph Burgess, Shepard Morgan and Walter W. Stewart to sail promptly to Paris, and on 7 March 1929 they presented a compromise text that formed the basis for subsequent developments.

Under the Young Committee's consensus concept, made public on 10 March 1929, the bank would serve a threefold purpose as a trustee, bank, and international organization of central bankers:

1. receiving, managing, and distributing German reparation annuities as a trustee;
2. facilitating German transfers by issuing counterpart bills, notes, and bonds; and
3. serving national central banks by taking their deposits, granting them credit, and carrying out currency and gold transactions on their behalf.

It would rely on nonpolitical staff located in a country not directly involved in the reparations disputes. Subsequent fine-tuning discussions revolved around the scope for the bank's lending to foster economic growth and trade, which would have given it a role similar to that of the later World Bank. Such a role was advocated by Schacht but opposed by France and by commercial bankers, on the grounds that it could be inflationary and create unfair competition to private-sector lenders. An overall agreement on the future bank, with draft statutes prepared by the Bank of England's Charles Stewart Addis, was achieved by the Young Committee on 25 March 1929.

Political positions within the Herbert Hoover administration made it impossible for U.S. Federal Reserve System officials to be formally involved in the initiative, but the U.S. was still able to retain major influence in the proceedings because of a shared perception amongst negotiators that the project would fail without U.S. participation. Major figures of the U.S. financial world would participate in the joint bank, and act in close cooperation with the Federal Reserve Bank of New York. The leverage held by the U.S. allowed Young and J. P. Morgan Jr. to make sure that Americans would be in leadership position at the bank when it started operations, as indeed happened.

The BIS concept was agreed to in August 1929 at the first part of the Hague conference on reparations. The bank's Charter, Statutes, Trust Agreement, and Convention on its relations with the host country were subsequently drafted by a special Organisation Committee chaired by Jackson Reynolds, president of the First National Bank of New York, which met in the discreet location of Hôtel Stéphanie (part of which later became Brenners Park-Hotel & Spa) at Baden-Baden from 3 October to 13 November 1929; the intense work was marred by the death of Delacroix from a heart attack during the proceedings. Aside from Reynolds, American participants in Baden-Baden also included Melvin Alvah Traylor, president of the First National Bank of Chicago, Warren Randolph Burgess, Shepard Morgan, and Leon Fraser (a legal expert with the Agent General for Reparation Payments), with J. P. Morgan Jr. monitoring the proceedings and advising from London.

As in the Paris discussions earlier in the year, the Baden-Baden committee had to reconcile the different visions for the future BIS, from purely a creation of central banks (as espoused by Italy's Alberto Beneduce and by Montagu Norman) to a supranational development bank with policy tasks such as developing world trade (as advocated by Schacht and UK Chancellor Philip Snowden). Other points of contention included the future institution's official language(s), for which the committee endorsed French, and location. For the latter, several delegates favored London, but that was vetoed by the French who proposed Brussels instead, which in turn was vetoed by the British; after Amsterdam failed to gain sufficient support, a consensus was eventually found on Basel, which combined neutral country status and good railway connections. The founding texts of the BIS were then approved at the second part of the Hague conference, on 20 January 1930, with only minor changes from the Baden-Baden drafts such as the addition of English to French as official language. These texts included the constituent Charter and Statutes for the bank, and a Convention (intergovernmental agreement) between Germany, Belgium, France, the United Kingdom, Italy, Japan, the United States, and Switzerland, establishing the bank's special status on Swiss soil and committing Switzerland to grant the Charter and approve the Statutes.

=== Creation ===
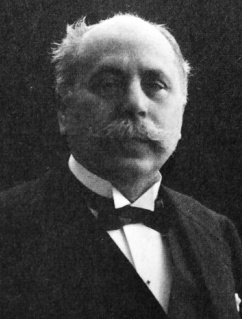
Bank of Italy Governor Bonaldo Stringher (1854–1930) chaired the BIS's founding meeting

The Convention and Charter were approved by the Swiss Federal Council and thus obtained force of law on 26 February 1930. The governors met that day and the next to formally approve and sign the statutes in Rome, out of consideration for the Bank of Italy's governor Bonaldo Stringher who was both the most senior in the group, and in poor health (he would pass away in December 1930). Aside from Stringher, who chaired the meeting, the other participants were: Vincenzo Azzolini and Alberto Beneduce, for Italy; Bank of England governor Montagu Norman and Harry Arthur Siepmann, for the UK; Bank of France governor Émile Moreau, Clément Moret and Pierre Quesnay, for France; Reichsbank governor Schacht, for Germany; National Bank of Belgium governor Louis Franck and Paul van Zeeland, for Belgium; and the Bank of Japan's London representative Tetsuzaburo Tanaka and diplomat Hiroshi Saito, for Japan. Thus the BIS was formally created in Rome on 27 February 1930. The BIS promptly opened its doors in Basel on 17 May 1930, ahead of the first German annuities under the Young Plan due in June.

The legal status of the bank combined features of a private-sector company and of a public international organization. It was a limited-liability company incorporated under Swiss law, whose shares could be held by individuals and non-governmental entities. However, the rights of voting and representation at the Bank's General Meeting were to be exercised exclusively by the central banks of the countries in which shares had been issued. At the same time, the BIS possessed de facto international legal personality, was exempted from Swiss taxation and banking supervision, and its senior management enjoyed diplomatic status. The Charter stipulated that "The Bank, its property and assets and all deposits and other funds entrusted to it shall be immune in time of peace and in time of war from any measure such as expropriation, requisition, seizure, confiscation, prohibition or restriction of gold or currency export or import, and any other similar measures." Under the Statutes, the governor of each of the founding central banks was a member of the BIS Board of Directors ex officio, and had the right to appoint a second Board member, plus an additional right for France and Germany to appoint a third Board member each for the duration of the Young Plan. In principle the Board could appoint up to nine additional directors, in practice however only the Dutch, Swedish and Swiss central bank governors were appointed in the BIS's first decades. The inaugural BIS Board had 16 members: Franck and Francqui (Belgium); Moreau, Georges Brincard and Melchior de Vogüé (France); Hans Luther, Carl Melchior and Paul Reusch (Germany); Stringher and Beneduce (Italy); Tanaka and Daisuke Nohara (Japan); Norman and Addis (UK); and Gates McGarrah and Fraser (United States).

=== Early activity ===
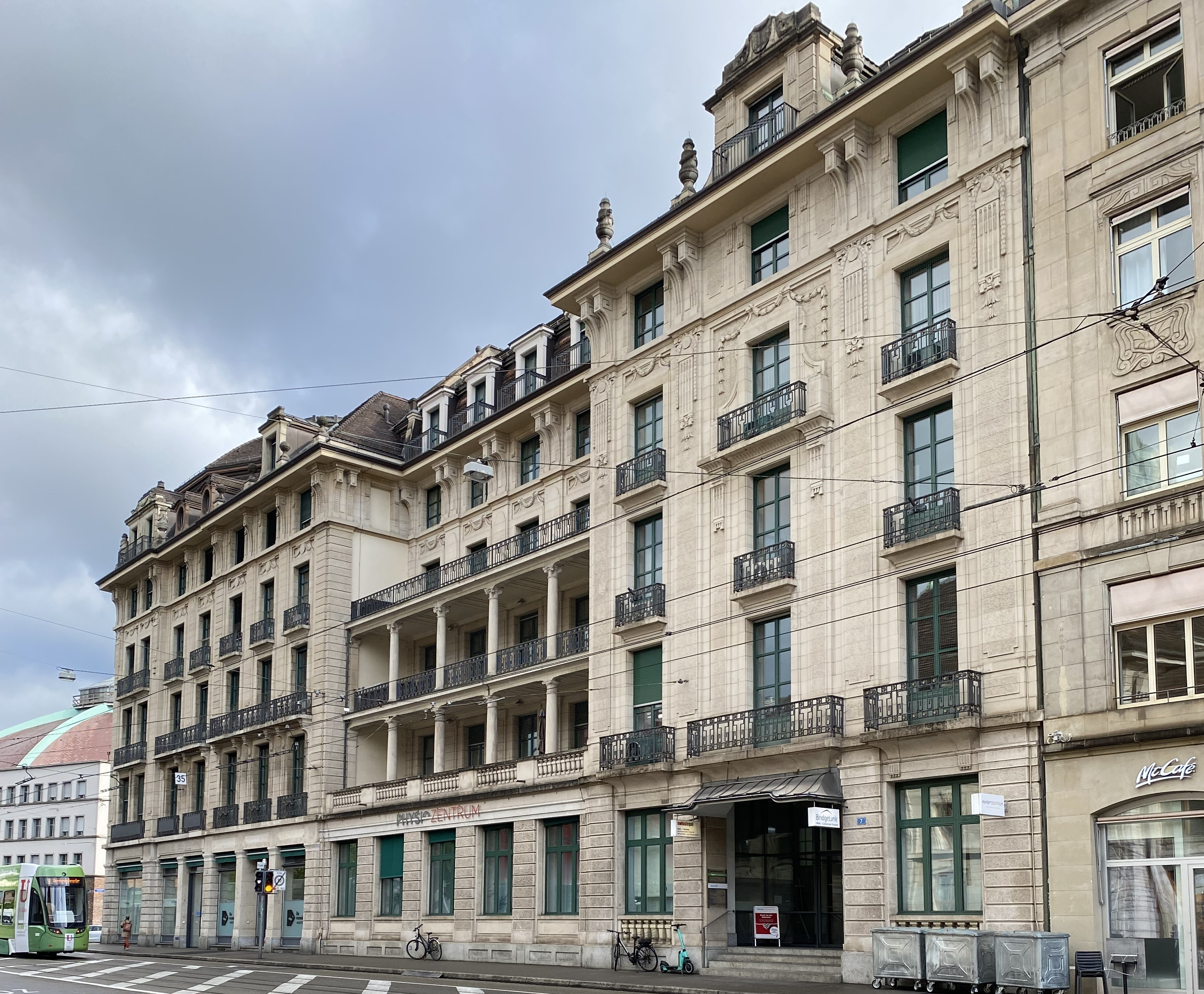
Early-20th-century former building of Savoy Hôtel Univers at Centralbahnstrasse 7 in Basel, the seat of the BIS from 1930 to 1977

The BIS had a quick start, even though its intended task of facilitating World War I reparation payments soon became obsolete. Even before the founding meeting in Rome, the Organisation Committee had secured a two-year lease of a convenient building in Basel, the former Grand Hôtel et Savoy Hôtel Univers across the street from Basel SBB railway station. By mid-April, Fraser had arrived from the United States and was working on the BIS's behalf from the Paris office of the Agent General for Reparation Payments, joined by McGarrah in April. The board members first met for an informal meeting in Basel on 22–23 April 1930, and adopted the bank's Statutes. They unanimously elected McGarrah as President of the BIS and Chairman of its Board, Fraser as alternate President, and Addis, Melchior and Moreau as Vice-Chairmen "with equal rank". Quesnay was appointed General Manager, albeit with the three German Board members voting against "for serious reasons of principle" (i.e. objecting to the choice of a French national rather than to Quesnay as an individual). These foundational decisions were later ratified by the first formal Board meeting on 17 May 1930, as the April meeting had also agreed that the ordinary meetings of the Board would henceforth take place in Basel on the second Monday of each month. On 17 May the BIS opened for business and formally took over the funds, accounts, capital, and records of the Agent General for Reparation Payments. On 20 May, the bank's shares were publicly issued.

Reparation payments were first suspended for one year (Hoover moratorium, June 1931) and then stopped altogether after the Lausanne Agreement of July 1932 failed to be ratified. Instead, the BIS focused on its second statutory task, i.e. fostering the cooperation between its member central banks. It acted as a meeting forum for central banks and provided banking facilities to them. For instance, in the late 1930s, the BIS was instrumental in helping continental European central banks ship out part of their gold reserves to London.

As a purportedly apolitical organization, the BIS was unable to prevent transactions that reflected contemporaneous geopolitical realities, but were also widely regarded as unconscionable. As a result of the policy of appeasement of Nazi Germany by the UK and France, in March 1939 the BIS transferred 23 tons of gold it held, on behalf of Czechoslovakia, to the German Reichsbank, following the German annexation of Czechoslovakia. The transfer was authorized by both the Bank of England and Bank of France, which the BIS consulted in a hurry; Montagu Norman approved it without consulting the UK treasury, arguing at the time: "I can't imagine any step more improper than to bring government into the current banking affairs of the BIS. I guess it would mean ruin". The transfer to the Reichsbank of the Czechoslovak gold reserves has been considered the most controversial action ever taken by the BIS.

=== World War II ===
At the outbreak of World War II in September 1939, the BIS Board of Directors decided that the Bank should remain open, but that, for the duration of hostilities, no meetings of the Board were to take place and the Bank should maintain a neutral stance in the conduct of its business. The neutral stance, however, was increasingly hard to maintain as BIS operations were beneficial to an otherwise financially isolated Germany. German conquests disrupted the previous balance within the BIS's governance bodies: at their peak, the Reichsbank together with central banks of Nazi-occupied countries held as much as 67.4 percent of the BIS voting stock. Reichsbank official Emil Puhl went as far as referring to the BIS as the Reichsbank's "only real foreign branch". While Board meetings were suspended, annual general meetings continued with shareholder banks voting by proxy. Between 1933 and 1945 the BIS Board of directors included Walther Funk, a prominent Nazi official, as well as Hermann Schmitz, the director of IG Farben, and Baron von Schroeder, the owner of the J. H. Stein Bank, all of whom were later convicted of war crimes or crimes against humanity; the Reichsbank's Puhl was responsible for processing dental gold looted from concentration camp victims, and was convicted at the Nuremberg Ministries Trial for war crimes.

The BIS's operations collapsed during the war, with business volume down 95 percent in 1943 compared with the prewar period. Interest payments from the Reichsbank made the bulk of its income, reaching 82 percent by the war's end. These payments were initially made in currency but from 1940 onwards were made in gold. For that, the Reichsbank used resources partly derived from Nazi plunder, which came under intense criticism in the United States. So-called Nazi gold was either confiscated from prisoners or seized in victory, and was thus unacceptable as payment to the BIS. Operations conducted by the BIS were viewed with increasing suspicion by the UK and US governments, albeit less so by the respective central banks. The 1944 Bretton Woods Conference recommended the "liquidation of the Bank for International Settlements at the earliest possible moment". This resulted in the BIS being the subject of a disagreement between the U.S. and British delegations. The liquidation of the bank was supported by other European delegates, as well as Americans (including Harry Dexter White and Secretary of the Treasury Henry Morgenthau Jr.). Abolition was opposed by John Maynard Keynes, head of the British delegation. Keynes went to Morgenthau hoping to prevent or postpone the dissolution, but the next day it was approved.

Despite the Bretton Woods resolution, the BIS eventually escaped liquidation, partly thanks to the dedicated advocacy on its behalf by Belgian governor Maurice Frère. In April 1945, the new U.S. president Harry S. Truman ended U.S. involvement in the scheme. The British government suspended the dissolution, and the decision to liquidate the BIS was officially reversed in 1948.

=== Postwar decades ===
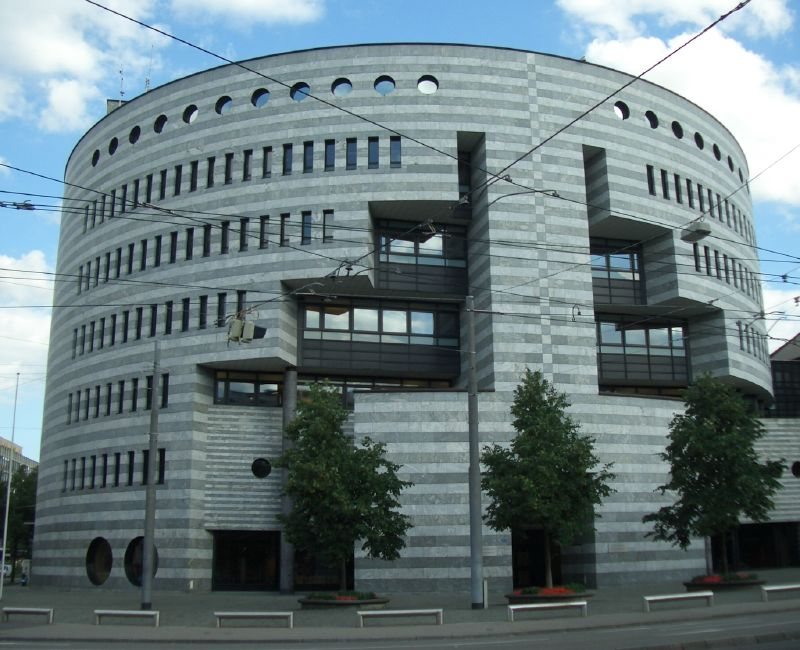
Botta building in Basel, acquired by the BIS in 1998

After World War II, the BIS had to rebuild both its reputation and its business model - in 1946 it registered a loss, for the first time in its history. It was also more narrowly focused on Europe. According to an announcement made by the Swiss Government on 26 December 1952, Japan renounced all rights, titles and interests in the BIS it had acquired under the Hague Convention of January 1930. The BIS acted as Agent for the European Payments Union (EPU, 1950–58), an intra-European clearing arrangement designed to help the European countries in restoring currency convertibility and free, multilateral trade. During the 1960s – the heyday of the Bretton Woods fixed exchange rate system – the BIS once again became the locus for transatlantic monetary cooperation. It coordinated the central banks' Gold Pool and a number of currency support operations (e.g. Sterling Group Arrangements of 1966 and 1968). The United States kept a distance but sent a senior Federal Reserve official, from 1960 to 1975 Charles Coombs, to attend the monthly governors' meetings. The Group of Ten (G10), including the main European economies, Canada, Japan, and the United States, became the most prominent grouping.

The BIS acquired land near the Basel SBB railway station between 1966 and 1972. Architect Martin Burckhardt made three design proposals in 1969, among which the Board of the BIS selected an 82-meter high round tower. This was opposed by locals and their representation in the Swiss Heritage Society, which led to a public referendum in 1971 in which 69% of voters endorsed a revised design with reduced height. The BIS moved into the new premises, the BIS Tower, in 1977.

With the end of the Bretton Woods system (1971–73) and the return to floating exchange rates, financial instability came to the fore. The collapse of some internationally active banks, such as Herstatt Bank (1974), highlighted the need for improved banking supervision at an international level. The G10 Governors created the Basel Committee on Banking Supervision (BCBS), which remains active. The BIS developed into a global meeting place for regulators and for developing international standards (Basel Concordat, Basel Capital Accord, Basel II and Basel III). Through its member central banks, the BIS was actively involved in the resolution of the Latin American debt crisis (1982).

From 1964 until 1993, the BIS provided the secretariat for the Committee of Governors of the Central Banks of the Member States of the European Community (Committee of Governors). This committee had been created by the European Council decision to improve monetary cooperation among the EC central banks. Likewise, the BIS in 1988–89 hosted most of the meetings of the Delors Committee (Committee for the Study of Economic and Monetary Union), which produced a blueprint for monetary unification subsequently adopted in the Maastricht Treaty (1992). In 1993, when the Committee of Governors was replaced by the European Monetary Institute (EMI – the precursor of the ECB), it moved from Basel to Frankfurt, cutting its ties with the BIS.

In 1998, the BIS acquired a second building on Aeschenplatz 1 in Basel, designed in 1986 by Mario Botta and previously owned and used by UBS. Since then, the BIS has used that building to host its banking operations on behalf of member central banks.

=== 21st century ===
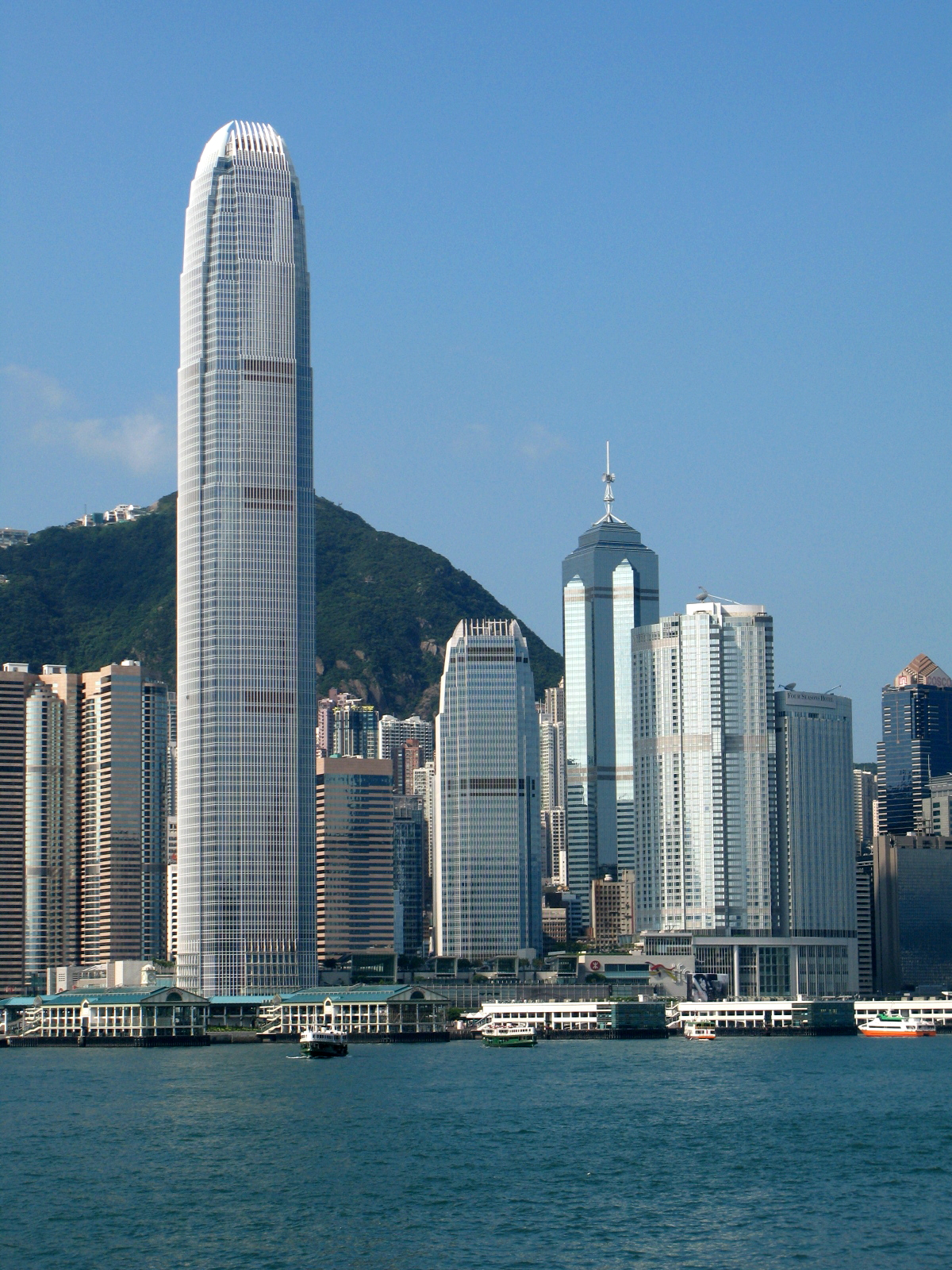
The BIS representative office for Asia and the Pacific is located in the International Financial Centre Tower 2 (left) in Hong Kong

In the 1990s–2000s, the BIS successfully globalized, breaking out of its traditional European core. This was reflected in a gradual increase in its membership (from 33 shareholding central bank members in 1995 to 60 in 2013, which together represent roughly 95% of global GDP), and also in the much more global composition of the BIS Board of Directors. In 1998, the BIS opened a Representative Office for Asia and the Pacific in the Hong Kong SAR. A BIS Representative Office for the Americas was established in 2002 in Mexico City.

After the 2022 Russian invasion of Ukraine, in March 2022 the BIS suspended the Bank of Russia's membership.

== Membership and shareholding structure ==
The BIS members are central banks of 63 jurisdictions: 34 in Europe, 16 in Asia, 5 in South America, 3 in North America, 3 in Africa, and 2 in Oceania. The United States is represented by two members, the United States Federal Reserve System and Federal Reserve Bank of New York. The Central Bank of Russia is a member but its engagement with the BIS has been suspended since early March 2022 (see History section above). In the list below, (*) indicates members of the BIS Global Economy Meetings (see below) and (**) indicates observers to these meetings.

- Bank of Algeria**
- Central Bank of Argentina*
- Reserve Bank of Australia*
- Oesterreichische Nationalbank (Austria)**
- National Bank of Belgium*
- Central Bank of Bosnia and Herzegovina
- Central Bank of Brazil*
- (Bulgaria) Bulgarian National Bank
- Bank of Canada*
- Central Bank of Chile**
- People's Bank of China*
- Bank of the Republic of Colombia**
- (Croatia) Croatian National Bank
- (Czech Republic) Czech National Bank**
- Danmarks Nationalbank (Denmark)**
- Bank of Estonia
- (European Union) European Central Bank*
- Bank of Finland**
- Bank of France*
- Deutsche Bundesbank (Germany)*
- Bank of Greece**
- Hong Kong Monetary Authority*
- Magyar Nemzeti Bank (Hungary)**
- Central Bank of Iceland
- Reserve Bank of India*
- Bank Indonesia*
- (Republic of Ireland) Central Bank of Ireland**
- Bank of Israel**
- Bank of Italy*
- Bank of Japan*
- (South Korea) Bank of Korea*
- Central Bank of Kuwait**
- Bank of Latvia
- Bank of Lithuania
- Central Bank of Luxembourg**
- Central Bank of Malaysia*
- Bank of Mexico*
- Bank Al-Maghrib (Morocco)**
- De Nederlandsche Bank (Netherlands)*
- Reserve Bank of New Zealand**
- National Bank of North Macedonia
- Central Bank of Norway**
- Central Reserve Bank of Peru**
- Bangko Sentral ng Pilipinas (Philippines)**
- Narodowy Bank Polski (Poland)*
- Banco de Portugal (Portugal)**
- National Bank of Romania**
- (Russia) Central Bank of the Russian Federation*
- (Saudi Arabia) Saudi Central Bank*
- National Bank of Serbia
- Monetary Authority of Singapore*
- National Bank of Slovakia
- Bank of Slovenia
- (South Africa) South African Reserve Bank*
- Bank of Spain*
- Sveriges Riksbank (Sweden)*
- (Switzerland) Swiss National Bank*
- Bank of Thailand*
- Central Bank of the Republic of Turkey*
- Central Bank of the United Arab Emirates**
- (United Kingdom) Bank of England*
- Federal Reserve Board (United States)
  - United States Federal Reserve System*
  - Federal Reserve Bank of New York*
- State Bank of Vietnam**

The BIS was originally owned by both central banks and private individuals, since the United States, Belgium and France had decided to sell all or some of the shares allocated to their central banks to private investors. BIS shares traded on stock markets, which made the bank an unusual organization: an international organization (in the technical sense of public international law), yet allowed for private shareholders. Many central banks had similarly started as such private institutions; for example, the Bank of England was privately owned until 1946.

At the end of 2000, such private shareholders still owned 72,648 shares, or nearly 14 percent of the BIS's capital at the time. The BIS subsequently initiated a buyback of these private owners at 16,000 Swiss francs per share, but a group of shareholders led by New York-based First Eagle Investments sued and won a court ruling that raised the repurchase price to SFR 25,052.90 per share - which the specialized publication Central Banking Journal called a "humiliating rebuff" for the BIS Board. The buyback operation was eventually completed in 2005. Since then, the BIS has been wholly owned by the member central banks.

== Central banking cooperation ==
The original goal of the BIS was "to promote the co-operation of central banks and to provide additional facilities for international financial operations; and to act as trustee or agent in regard to international financial settlements entrusted to it under agreements with the parties concerned", as stated in its Statutes of 1930. The BIS pursues its mission by:

- fostering discussion and facilitating collaboration among central banks;
- supporting dialogue with other authorities that are responsible for promoting financial stability;
- carrying out research and policy analysis on issues of relevance for monetary and financial stability;
- acting as a prime counterparty for central banks in their financial transactions; and
- serving as an agent or trustee in connection with international financial operations.

=== Basel Meetings ===
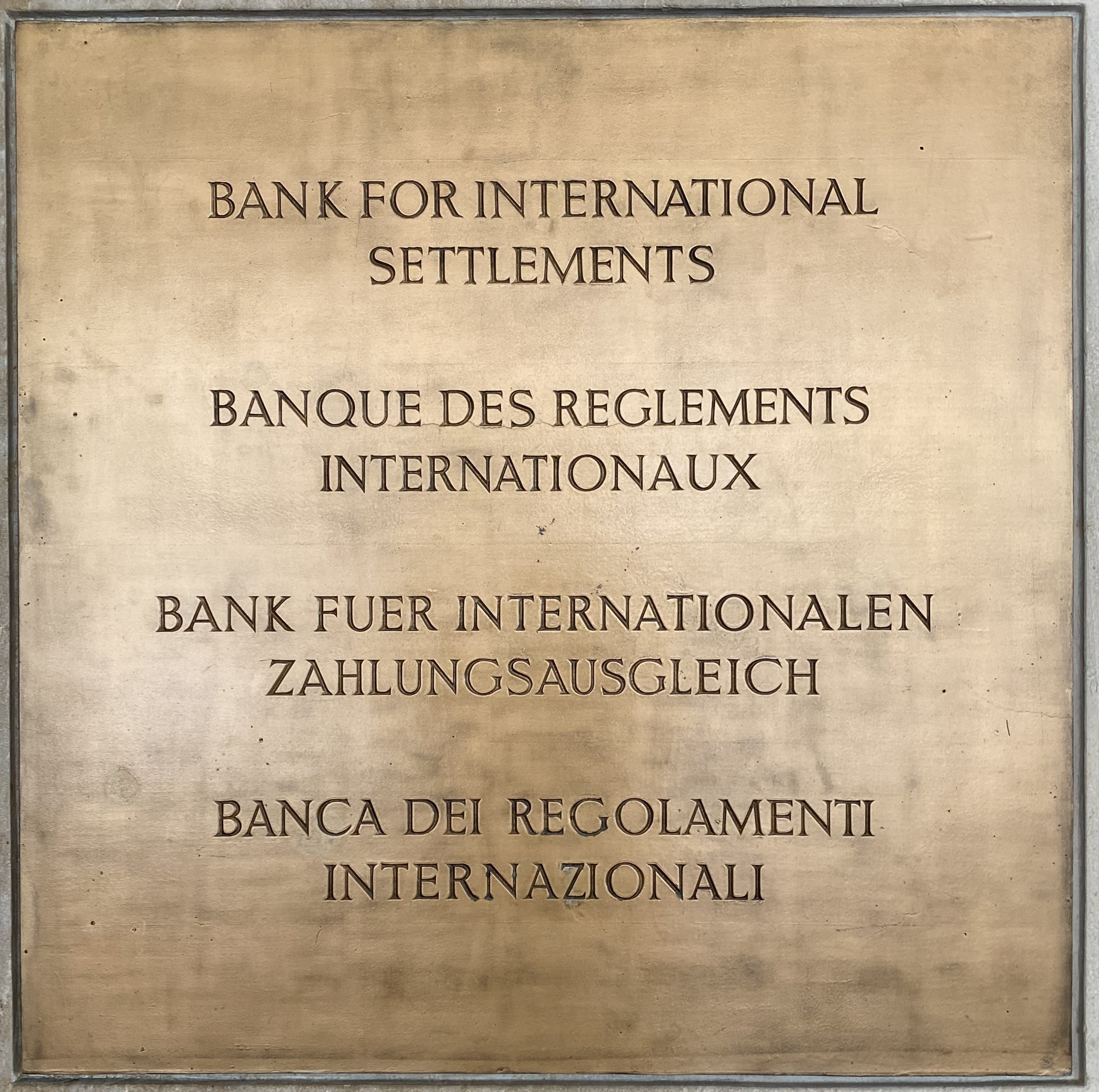
Brass plaque sign at the entrance of the BIS building in Basel, displaying its name in four languages

The activity of the BIS has always revolved around the regular meetings of its membership in Basel. In the 1930s, these meetings were held every month, with two interruptions resulting in ten meetings per year. Since 1998, these meetings have been held every other month, so six times a year.

The meetings follow a perennial sequence. On Sunday evening, the inner group of governors gather at 7pm for the so-called Economic Consultative Committee, which typically lasts for about an hour followed by dinner, a key moment for informal exchange and coordination. On Monday morning, the Global Economy Meeting (GEM) brings together a broader group of central banks, typically from 9:30am to 12:30pm. On Monday afternoon, the so-called Governors' Meeting lasts from 2pm to 5pm. With the suspension of Russia since March 2022, 30 jurisdictions are members of the GEM and an additional 22 participate as observers.

The sequence has not changed markedly from the BIS's beginnings. In the 1930s, the governors' monthly meetings started at 4pm on the Sunday, and the next two days were filled with meetings and social activities.

=== Basel Committee on Banking Supervision ===
The BIS hosts the Secretariat of the Basel Committee on Banking Supervision (BCBS), colloquially referred to simply as the "Basel Committee", and with it has played a central role in establishing the Basel I in 1988, Basel II in 2004, and Basel III in 2010–2017.

Capital adequacy policy applies to equity and capital assets. These can be overvalued in many circumstances because they do not always reflect current market conditions or adequately assess the risk of every trading position. Accordingly, the Basel standards require the capital adequacy ratio of internationally active commercial banks to be above a prescribed minimum international standard, to improve the resilience of the banking sector.

=== Committee on the Global Financial System ===
The Committee on the Global Financial System (CGFS) was established in 1971 as the Euro-currency Standing Committee, and adopted its current name in 1999. It reports to the Global Economy Meeting.

As of 2023, it had 28 members: Central Bank of Argentina, Reserve Bank of Australia, National Bank of Belgium, Central Bank of Brazil, Bank of Canada, People's Bank of China, European Central Bank, Bank of France, Deutsche Bundesbank, Hong Kong Monetary Authority, Reserve Bank of India, Bank of Italy, Bank of Japan, Bank of Korea, Central Bank of Luxembourg, Bank of Mexico, De Nederlandsche Bank, Central Bank of Russia, Saudi Central Bank, Monetary Authority of Singapore, South African Reserve Bank, Bank of Spain, Sveriges Riksbank, Swiss National Bank, Bank of Thailand, Bank of England, Board of Governors of the Federal Reserve System, and Federal Reserve Bank of New York.

The CGFS has a mandate to identify and assess potential sources of stress in the global financial system and to promote improvements to its functioning and stability.

=== Markets Committee ===
The Markets Committee is the oldest of the BIS-hosted committees, originally established in 1962 as the Committee on Gold and Foreign Exchange. It also reports to the Global Economy Meeting.

As of 2023, it had 27 members: Reserve Bank of Australia, National Bank of Belgium, Central Bank of Brazil, Bank of Canada, People's Bank of China, European Central Bank, Bank of France, Deutsche Bundesbank, Hong Kong Monetary Authority, Reserve Bank of India, Bank of Indonesia, Bank of Italy, Bank of Japan, Bank of Korea, Central Bank of Malaysia, Bank of Mexico, De Nederlandsche Bank, Central Bank of Russia, Monetary Authority of Singapore, South African Reserve Bank, Bank of Spain, Sveriges Riksbank, Swiss National Bank, Central Bank of the Republic of Türkiye, Bank of England, Board of Governors of the Federal Reserve System, and Federal Reserve Bank of New York.

=== Committee on Payments and Market Infrastructure ===
Another of the committees hosted at the BIS is the Committee on Payments and Market Infrastructures (CPMI). The Committee on Payment and Settlement Systems (CPSS) was established in 1990 and extended the prior work of the Group of Experts on Payment Systems (1980) and Committee on Interbank Netting Schemes (1989), and was in turn renamed to CPMI in 2014. Its membership was extended in 1997–98, 2009, and 2018 to reach the following 28 members: Central Bank of Argentina, Reserve Bank of Australia, National Bank of Belgium, Central Bank of Brazil, Bank of Canada, People's Bank of China, European Central Bank, Bank of France, Deutsche Bundesbank, Hong Kong Monetary Authority, Reserve Bank of India, Bank Indonesia, Bank of Italy, Bank of Japan, Bank of Korea, Bank of Mexico, De Nederlandsche Bank, Central Bank of Russia, Saudi Central Bank, Monetary Authority of Singapore, South African Reserve Bank, Bank of Spain, Sveriges Riksbank, Swiss National Bank, Central Bank of the Republic of Türkiye, Bank of England, the Board of Governors of the Federal Reserve System and Federal Reserve Bank of New York.

One of the Group's first projects, a detailed review of payment system developments in the G10 countries, was published by the BIS in 1985 in the first of a series that has become known as "Red Books". Currently, the red books cover countries participating in the CPMI. A sample of statistical data in the red books appears in the table below, where local currency is converted to US dollars using end-of-year rates.

Banknotes and coin in circulation (31 December 2018)
Per capita	Country or region	Total ($ billions)
$10,194	Switzerland	$87
$8,471	Hong Kong SAR	$63
$8,290	Japan	$1,048
$6,378	Singapore	$36
$5,238	United States	$1,719
$4,230	Eurozone	$1,446
$2,404	Australia	$60
$2,003	Korea	$103
$1,924	Canada	$71
$1,683	Saudi Arabia	$56
$1,417	United Kingdom	$94
$1,009	Russia	$148
$825	China	$1,151
$682	Sweden	$7
$680	Mexico	$85
$513	Argentina	$23
$327	Brazil	$68
$311	Turkey	$26
$230	India	$307
$205	South Africa	$12
$196	Indonesia	$52

=== Irving Fisher Committee ===
The Irving Fisher Committee on Central Bank Statistics gathers 110 members, of which 106 are national central banks and the remaining 4 are regional organizations such as the Center for Latin American Monetary Studies (CEMLA), Central American Monetary Council, and South East Asian Central Banks Research and Training Centre (SEACEN). It is led by an 11-member executive elected by its members and currently chaired by the Governor of the Reserve Bank of Australia, Michele Bullock.

Created in 1997, the Irving Fisher Committee has formally established its permanent secretariat at the BIS in 2006, reflecting the willingness to foster closer and formal statistical cooperation among central banks, which are both users and producers of official statistics. The Committee is associated with the International Statistical Institute (ISI) and is a member of the International Association for Official Statistics (IAOS). Over the years, the Committee has been significantly expanding its membership, making it the committee with the largest international coverage among all other BIS-hosted associations or committees.

According to its public terms of reference, the primary goal of the Irving Fisher Committee is to promote the exchange of views on statistical and data issues of interest to central banks. Among its various missions, the committee provides a forum of discussion in which central bank statisticians, economists and other data experts can discuss general statistical and data topics. Reflecting the growing role of data in for central banks, the committee also acts as a reference point for discussions related to the production and use of new data sources, types and techniques, including machine learning and artificial intelligence. It also promises the collaboration on enchanting the global statistical infrastructure, including in the context of the standard for Data and Metadata.

=== Financial Stability Institute ===
The Financial Stability Institute is dedicated to debates and exchanges of practices among supervisors and financial stability policymakers. It was established in 1999 in the wake of the 1997 Asian financial crisis. It has been led by Josef Tošovský from December 2000 to December 2016, and by Fernando Restoy since January 2017.

=== BIS Innovation Hub ===
The BIS Innovation Hub, launched in 2019, extends the BIS mission of collaboration through digital innovation, developing technology-based public goods to support central banks and enhance the functioning of the financial system.

The BIS Innovation Hub has offices in Hong Kong SAR, Singapore, Switzerland, London, Stockholm and Toronto.

Among other Innovation Hub projects, the BIS signed an agreement with Central Bank of Malaysia, Bank of Thailand, Bangko Sentral ng Pilipinas, Monetary Authority of Singapore, and the Reserve Bank of India on 30 June 2024 as founding member of Project Nexus, a multilateral international initiative to enable retail cross-border payments. Bank Indonesia involved as a special observer. The platform, which in 2024 was expected to go live by 2026, would interlink domestic fast payment systems of the member countries.

=== Other associations hosted by the BIS ===
The BIS hosts the secretariats of the Financial Stability Board, the International Association of Insurance Supervisors, and International Association of Deposit Insurers. These entities, unlike the above listed committees, have no direct reporting links to the BIS.

== Financials ==
The BIS operates in the private market as a counterparty, asset manager and lender for central banks and international financial institutions. It denominates its financials in IMF special drawing rights. The balance sheet total of the BIS on 31 March 2019 was SDR 291.1 billion (US$403.7 billion) and a net profit of SDR 461.1 million (US$639.5 million).

== Leadership ==
The Chairmen concurrently held the role of President from April 1930 to May 1937. Johan Beyen of the Netherlands served as President from May 1937 to December 1939, succeeded by American national Thomas H. McKittrick from January 1940 to June 1946. The position of President remained vacant from June 1946 to June 1948, when the roles of President and Chair of the Board were again reunited until the former was abolished on 27 June 2005. Meanwhile, the Chair had been left vacant from May 1940 to December 1942.

=== BIS Chairs ===
Chair	Nationality	Dates
Gates McGarrah	United States	April 1930 – May 1933
Leon Fraser	United States	May 1933 – May 1935
Leonardus Trip	Netherlands	May 1935 – May 1937
Otto Niemeyer	United Kingdom	May 1937 – May 1940
Ernst Weber	Switzerland	December 1942 – November 1945
Maurice Frère	Belgium	July 1946 – June 1958
Marius Holtrop	Netherlands	July 1958 – June 1967
Jelle Zijlstra	Netherlands	July 1967 – December 1981
Fritz Leutwiler	Switzerland	January 1982 – December 1984
Jean Godeaux	Belgium	January 1985 – December 1987
Wim Duisenberg	Netherlands	January 1988 – December 1990
Bengt Dennis	Sweden	January 1991 – December 1993
Wim Duisenberg	Netherlands	January 1994 – June 1997
Alfons Verplaetse	Belgium	July 1997 – February 1999
Urban Bäckström	Sweden	March 1999 – February 2002
Nout Wellink	Netherlands	March 2002 – February 2006
Jean-Pierre Roth	Switzerland	March 2006 – February 2009
Guillermo Ortiz	Mexico	March 2009 – December 2009
Christian Noyer	France	March 2010 – October 2015
Jens Weidmann	Germany	November 2015 – December 2021
François Villeroy de Galhau	France	January 2022 – June 2026
Fabio Panetta	Italy	June 2026 – present

=== BIS General Managers ===
General Manager	Nationality	Dates
Pierre Quesnay	France	April 1930 – September 1937
Roger Auboin	France	January 1938 – September 1958
Guillaume Guindey	France	October 1958 – March 1963
Gabriel Ferras	France	April 1963 – December 1970
René Larre	France	March 1971 – February 1981
Gunther Schleiminger	Germany	March 1981 – April 1985
Alexandre Lamfalussy	Belgium	May 1985 – December 1993
Andrew Crockett	United Kingdom	January 1994 – March 2003
Malcolm Knight	Canada	April 2003 – September 2008
Jaime Caruana	Spain	April 2009 – November 2017
Agustín Carstens	Mexico	December 2017 – June 2025
Pablo Hernández de Cos	Spain	July 2025 – present

=== Board of directors ===
As of September 2026:

- Ayman Al-Sayari (Saudi Central Bank)
- Andrew Bailey (Bank of England)
- Gabriel Galípolo (Central Bank of Brazil)
- Christine Lagarde (European Central Bank)
- Tiff Macklem (Bank of Canada)
- Sanjay Malhotra (Reserve Bank of India)
- Emmanuel Moulin (Bank of France)
- Joachim Nagel (Deutsche Bundesbank)
- Pan Gongsheng (People's Bank of China)
- Fabio Panetta (Bank of Italy), Chair
- Kevin Warsh (Federal Reserve System)
- Victoria Rodríguez Ceja (Bank of Mexico)
- Martin Schlegel (Swiss National Bank)
- Hyun Song Shin (Bank of Korea)
- Erik Thedéen (Sveriges Riksbank)
- Kazuo Ueda (Bank of Japan)
- John C. Williams (Federal Reserve Bank of New York)
- Pierre Wunsch (National Bank of Belgium)

== Controversy ==
In May 1935, the BIS was the focus of allegations of insider trading, relayed by an article in the Berner Tagblatt. The BIS undertook an internal investigation but did not take punitive action.

== See also ==
- World War I reparations
- Central bank
- Global financial system
- International financial institutions
