= Gates W. McGarrah =

American banker (1863–1940)

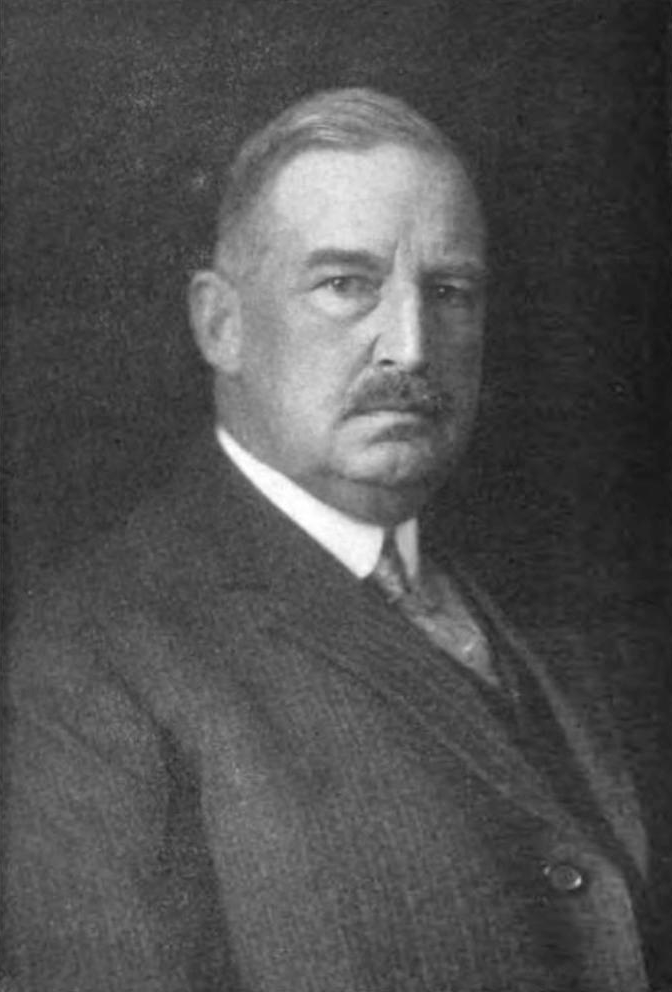

President of the Bank for International Settlements
- In office April 1930 – May 1933
- General Manager: Pierre Quesnay
- Preceded by: Inaugural holder
- Succeeded by: Leon Fraser

Personal details
- Born: Gates White McGarrah; July 20, 1863 Monroe, New York, U.S.
- Died: November 5, 1940 (aged 77) New York City, U.S.
- Party: Republican
- Spouse: Elizabeth Wallace (m. 1886)
- Relations: Richard Helms (grandson)
- Children: 2
- Occupation: Banker

Gates White McGarrah II (July 20, 1863 – November 5, 1940) was a prominent American banker who served as the first president of the Bank for International Settlements.

== Early life ==
McGarrah was born on July 20, 1863, in Monroe, Orange County, New York. He was the son of Theodore McGarrah (1835–1907), a country storekeeper, and Mary Abbott (née Pearsall) McGarrah (1834–1917). Among his siblings was younger brother Eugene McGarrah, and younger sister, Ella McGarrah. His paternal grandparents were Gates White McGarrah—the son of New York Assemblyman John McGarrah—and Mary Ann (née VanDuzer) McGarrah. His maternal grandfather was Rowland Pearsall.

He attended grade and high schools in Orange County.

== Career ==
At the age of 18, McGarrah moved to nearby Goshen, New York, where he was employed by the Goshen National Bank beginning in 1881. In 1883, he began his first job in New York was as a check clerk in the Produce Exchange Bank. In 1892, he was made assistant cashier of the Bank. Later in his career he was known as one of the "Country Boys as City Bankers."

In 1898, he became cashier of the Leather Manufacturers National Bank, before becoming its president in 1902. The Bank merged with the Mechanic's National Bank in 1904 and McGarrah was chosen to be president of the merged bank. While he ran Mechanic, it acquired the Fourth National Bank, the National Copper Bank, and the Produce Exchange Bank before it merged with Chase National Bank in 1926. After the 1926 merger, he became chairman of the executive committee of the Chase Bank.

In 1903, McGarrah, along with the American Bankers Association, was one of the founders of the American Institute of Banking which provided professional education via examinations and certificates. During the Panic of 1907, he was a member of the New York Clearing House Association, later serving as its president. In 1918, as head of the Mechanics and Metals Bank, he was aligned with William P. G. Harding, Chairman of the Federal Reserve, in his fear of "unsettlement as result of general adoption of higher rates on deposits." On August 30, 1924, he was appointed as the American director of the general council of the Reichsbank, the central bank of Germany from 1876 until 1945. (Note: During his time with the Reichsbank, Hjalmar Schacht served as president of the Bank.) McGarrah was quoted as saying:

"There is no wizardry in finance. The only foundation for success is patience, hard work and good friends."

From 1923 to 1926, McGarrah, a Republican, served as a director of the Federal Reserve Bank of New York. In 1927, he was appointed by the Federal Reserve Board of Governors in Washington as Federal Reserve agent and chairman of the board in New York. He also served as a director of the Astor Trust Company, the Bankers Trust Company and the Mercantile Trust Company. He was a member of the board of directors of the Astor Foundation, which owned Newsweek.

In April 1930, McGarrah became the first president and chairman of the board of the Bank for International Settlements in Basel, Switzerland, established to "clear German reparations and interallied debts and to develop new facilities for international banking." (Note: The idea for the Bank for International Settlements originated in the United States, and the "individuals involved were international bankers who, despite past differences, 'worked together to establish a world financial order that would incorporate the federal principle of the American central banking system.' Specifically among them were people such as 'Owen D. Young, J. Pierpont Morgan, Thomas W. Lamont, S. Parker Gilbert, Gates W. McGarrah, and Jackson Reynolds, who, in conjunction with the Federal Reserve Bank of New York, sought to extend the principle of central bank cooperation to the international sphere.'") He was nominated to represent the American banking system on the "directorate of the world bank" by a group of private bankers (including J.P. Morgan & Co., the First National Bank of New York, and the First National Bank of Chicago) after "the State Department of the United States had refused to allow the Federal Reserve to participate formally in the world bank." He served as president, with a staff representing ten nationalities and speaking four languages, that operated twenty-four currencies and had investments from Tokyo to Rome and Helsinki, until his retirement in 1933.

== Personal life ==
On October 6, 1886, McGarrah was married to Elizabeth Wallace (1863–1951) in Goshen. Elizabeth was the daughter of John Wallace and Mary (née Strong) Wallace. Together, they lived in New York City and Woods Hole, Massachusetts (where they had a summer home), and were the parents of:

- Marion Lavinia McGarrah (1889–1975), who married Herman Henry Helms, an Alcoa executive, and the son of "Herr and Frau Dietrich Helms of Sudwalder bei Bassum, Germany."
- Helen McGarrah (1904–1984), who married Jabez Curry Watson Jr. (1901–1944). After his death, she married Murray Paton Fleming, a former wing commander in the Royal Canadian Air Force, in 1946.

He was a member of the Metropolitan Club, the Riding Club, the City Club, the Down Town Club, the Midday Club, the Brook Club, the Bankers Club, the Tuxedo Club, the Links Club, the Recess Club, the Orange County Club, the New York Yacht Club, the Racquet and Tennis Club, and Union League Club in New York, serving as its president for some time. Peruvian artist Carlos Baca-Flor painted a portrait of McGarrah, as did A. S. Nowell. For a time, the McGarrah's lived in a large mansion at 740 Madison Avenue and East 64th Street owned by Charles Jefferson Harrah and altered by architect Mantle Fielding. He later lived at 635 Park Avenue.

McGarrah died at the Doctors Hospital in Manhattan on November 5, 1940. After a funeral at the Collegiate Church of St. Nicholas, he was buried at Slate Hill Cemetery in Goshen. In his 1940 obituary in Time magazine, they called him "Silent Gates" and "Tycoon McGarrah" (from a 1930 story). His widow, who lived at 400 Park Avenue after his death, died at their home in Goshen in October 1951.

=== Descendants ===
Through his daughter Marion, he was a grandfather of former Director of Central Intelligence and United States Ambassador to Iran, Richard McGarrah Helms (1913–2002). In 1950, Helms published The Gates W. McGarrah Collection of Presidential Autographs, photostats of sixty-eight autograph letters of the presidents from George Washington through Theodore Roosevelt, assembled by McGarrah. Another grandson, World War II naval officer, Gates McGarrah Helms, was married to Mount Holyoke College graduate, Alberta Brantley Loughran, daughter of Roger Hall Loughran.

Through his daughter Helen, he was a grandfather to three boys, Hugh Watson, David Watson and Michael Watson.

Business positions
Preceded by Inaugural holder	President of the Bank for International Settlements; 1930–1933	Succeeded by Leon Fraser
