= Mechanics and Metals National Bank =

National Bank in New York

Mechanics and Metals National Bank of the City of New York
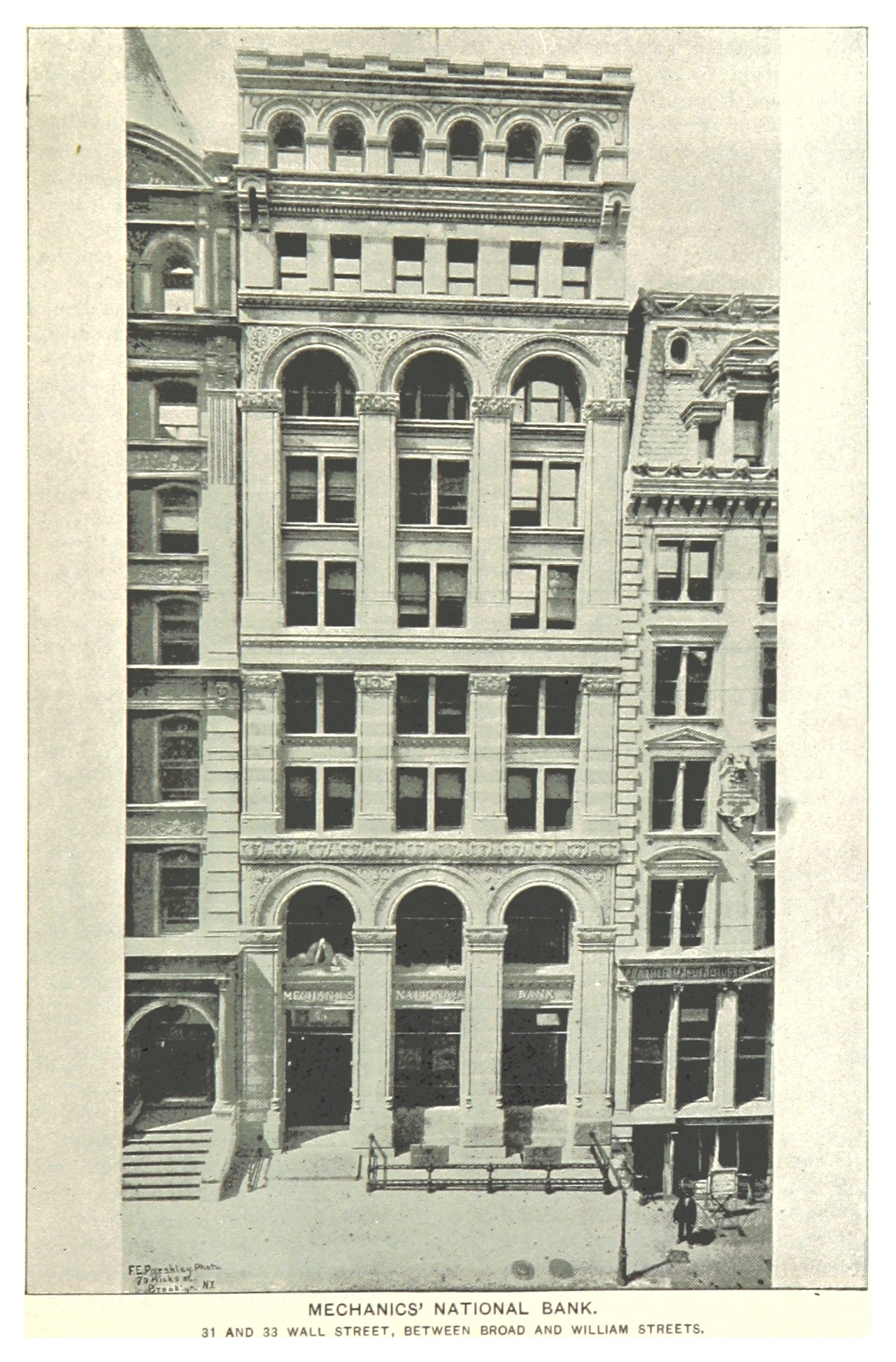
- Wall Street office, Ca 1890
- Founded: 1810 (as Mechanics National Bank); 1910 (as Mechanics and Metals National Bank)
- Fate: Consolidated with Chase National Bank in 1926
- Headquarters: New York City
- Key people: Gates W. McGarrah (president)

The Mechanics and Metals National Bank (MMNB) was a bank in New York City, founded in 1810 as the Mechanics National Bank. In 1910, it merged with National Copper Bank and took the Mechanics and Metals National Bank name. After a number of mergers and acquisitions, in 1926 MMNB consolidated with the Chase National Bank.

== History ==
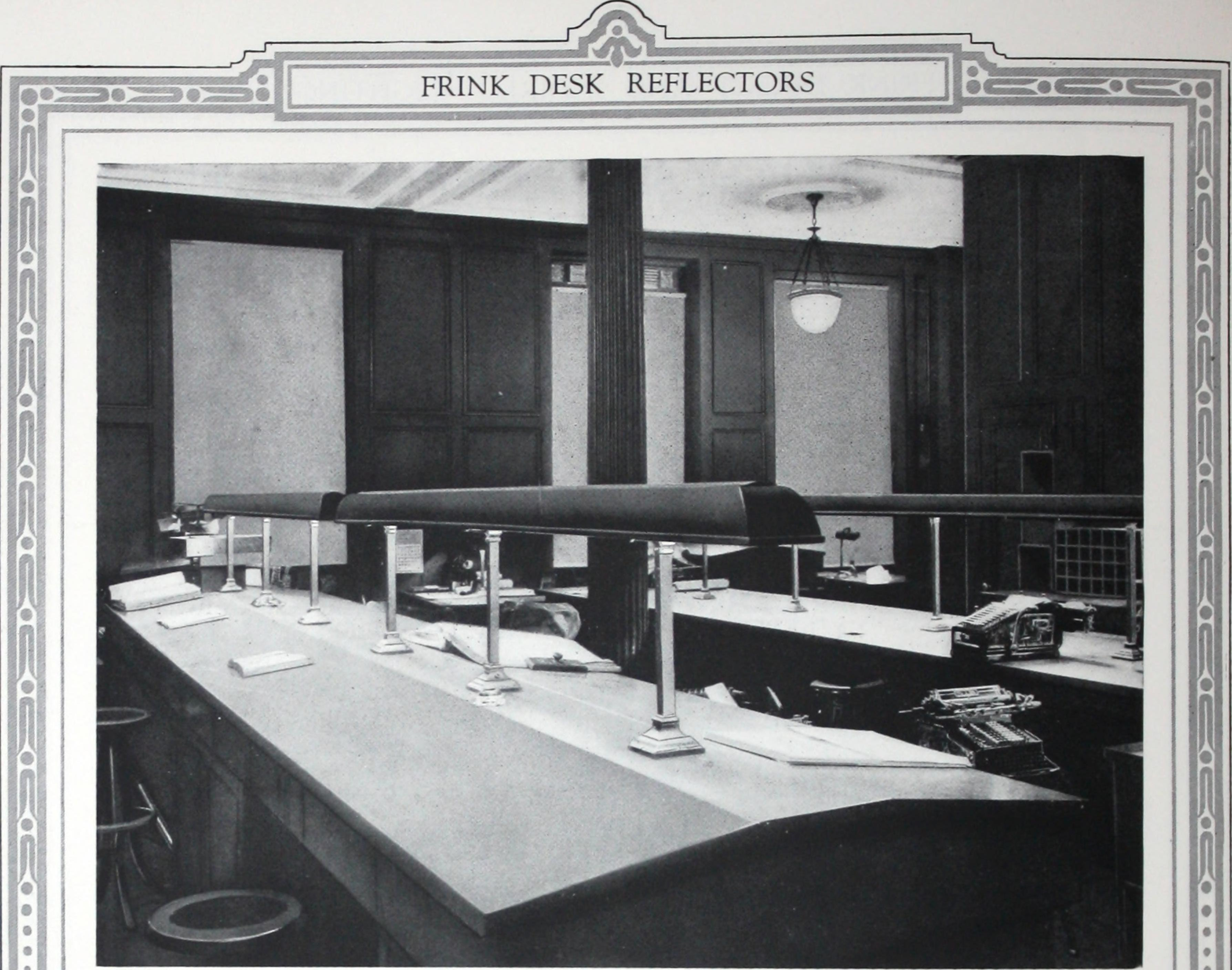
Mechanics and Metals National Bank of the City of New York banking room in 1921, covering an area of approximately 10,500 square feet.

Mechanics National Bank was founded in 1810 in New York City. In 1910, it merged with National Copper Bank (est. 1907 in New York), and took the Mechanics and Metals National Bank name. In 1911, a new and unrelated bank with the name, National Copper Bank, was founded in Salt Lake City.

In May 1914, the directors of the Mechanics and Metals National Bank and the Fourth National Bank of New York agreed to unite. Mechanics and Metals had offered $200 a share for the stock of Fourth National. In March 1914, immediately before the merger, the Mechanics and Metals had net deposits of $58,433,000 and Fourth National had net deposits of $33,408,000. The resultant bank had net deposits of approximately $90,000,000.

After approval from the Controller of the Currency the day before, on June 21, 1920, Mechanics and Metals and the Produce Exchange Union were merged. With branches in Manhattan and a main office at 20 Nassau Street, the new consolidated institution was named Mechanics and Metals National Bank. Combined capital, surplus, and profits of the new bank were approximated at $25,000,000, with deposits exceeding $200,000,000. Stockholders elected directors from both former institutions, including John E. Berwind of the Berwind-White Coal Mining Company, William H. Childs of the Barrett Company, Walter C. Hubbard of Hubbard Bros. and Co, Ambrose G. Todd of Reeves and Todd, and Gates W. McGarrah. McGarrah was also named president of the Mechanics and Metals National Bank, after several years as president of the New York Produce Exchange National Bank.

As of March 9, 1921, four national banks in New York City operated branch offices: Chatham and Phenix National, the Mechanics and Metals National, the Irving National, and National City Bank.

Between 1922 and 1925, together with several other New York banks, the Mechanics and Metals National Bank held a small ownership position in the Bank of Central and South America.

In 1926, MMNB consolidated with the Chase National Bank. Late that year, the Chase made plans to raze the MMNB main branch building at 20 Nassau Street in order to build a new headquarters for Chase. By March 1927, the building had been torn down, but its safe proved very difficult to demolish. The blueprints were finalized in June 1927.

== See also ==
- List of banks
