= Carlos Baca-Flor =

Peruvian artist (1869–1941)

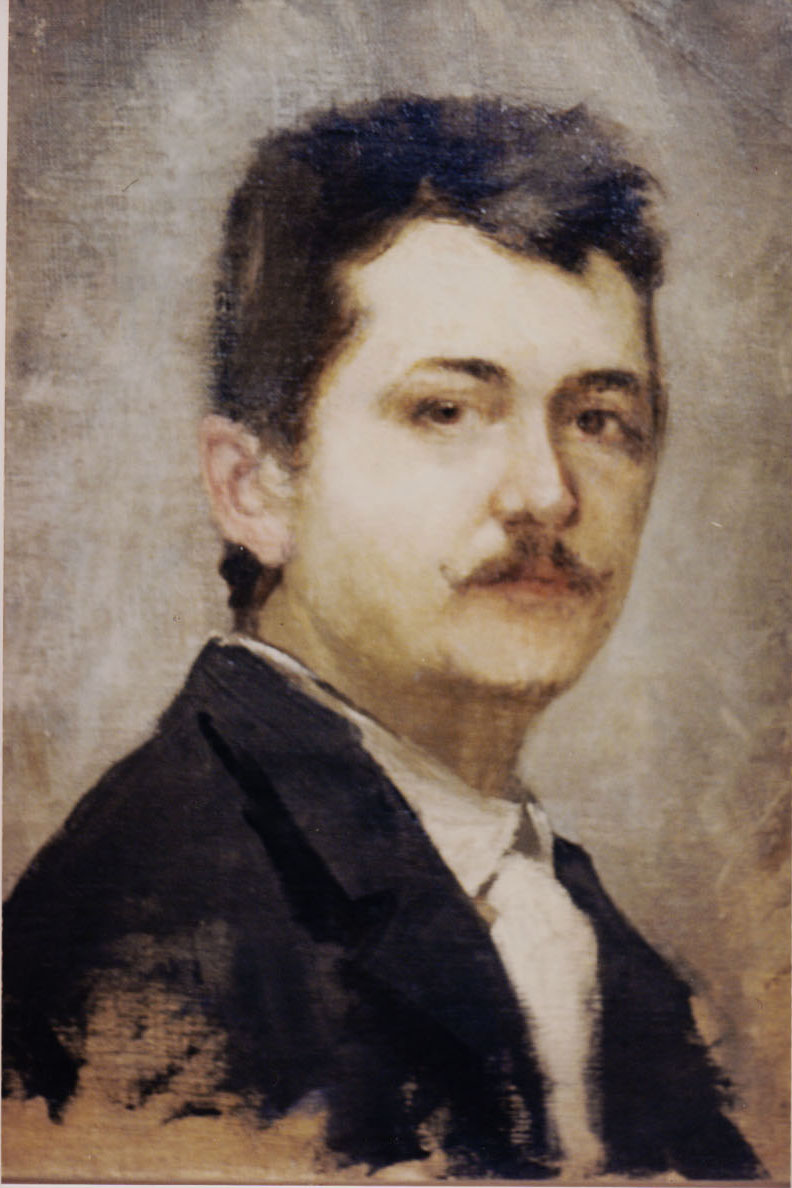
Self-portrait

Carlos Baca-Flor Falcón (June 11, 1869 – February 20, 1941) was a Peruvian painter known for his portraits.

== Biography ==
Baca-Flor was born in the Islay region of Arequipa, in the south of Peru. After his first birthday, his family moved to Santiago, Chile. In Santiago, Baca-Flor did his first studies, showing a talent for art which was encouraged by his parents. When Baca-Flor was 13 years old, his father died. He would be a large supporter and a driving factor after his death for Baca-Flor to continue and pursue art. Baca-Flor was placed under the care of his cultured and generous mother, Julia. Every Friday, she invited 12 poor children to their house and personally looked after them. Their life was hard, and they spent days without eating for lack of money. To earn a living, his mother taught piano to children in wealthy Santiago.

In Chile, Baca-Flor was extremely close to his friends and teachers. When he was in the Academia de Artes de Santiago he was just a teenager, impetuous and full of ideas. Students in years above him called him "the critical" (el crítico) because he found the defects in their work. Always excelling, he won the gold medal in painting, sculpture, and drawing every year.

At the end of his studies, he received the Rome Prize, a special award for having won the last three contests in a row. On the podium the day of the awards, the rector of the Academia de Artes offered to naturalize him, since being Chilean was a requirement for the award. Baca-Flor declined the offer, saying he could not betray his homeland, and left the ceremony immediately.

He arrived in Paris in 1890 with the help of the Peruvian government. There he met the Spanish master Francisco Pradilla, who directed the Academia Española de Bellas Artes de Roma, and he was a close friend of the Catalan young painter Hermen Anglada Camarasa.

In 1907, he won first place in the annual salon of French artists; sixty critics unanimously declared him the winner. His work was exhibited in the "Salon of Honor". The next year, he met John Pierpont Morgan, the American banking magnate. That year, Morgan had been visiting the clothes designer for his family, the famed Mr. Worth. Entering the tailor's workshop, he saw on the back wall a painted portrait of Worth, and exclaimed, "Incredible... I should meet him; I never thought I would find a painter who could paint my portrait" (Increíble... Debo conocerlo, jamás pensé encontrar a un pintor que pudiera retratarme).

Morgan visited Baca-Flor accompanied by Count León Molk, a friend of Baca-Flor and relative of Morgan. Morgan introduced himself to Baca-Flor and requested that Baca-Flor paint his portrait. For nearly two years, Baca-Flor traveled to the United States to paint Morgan; over time, they became friends.

Baca-Flor's life ended with fame and professional success. He died in France in the summer of 1941. Collections of his works are conserved at the Lima Art Museum and the Museo Central in Peru as well as the Museu de Terrassa, an old town near Barcelona.

== Partial list of portraits ==
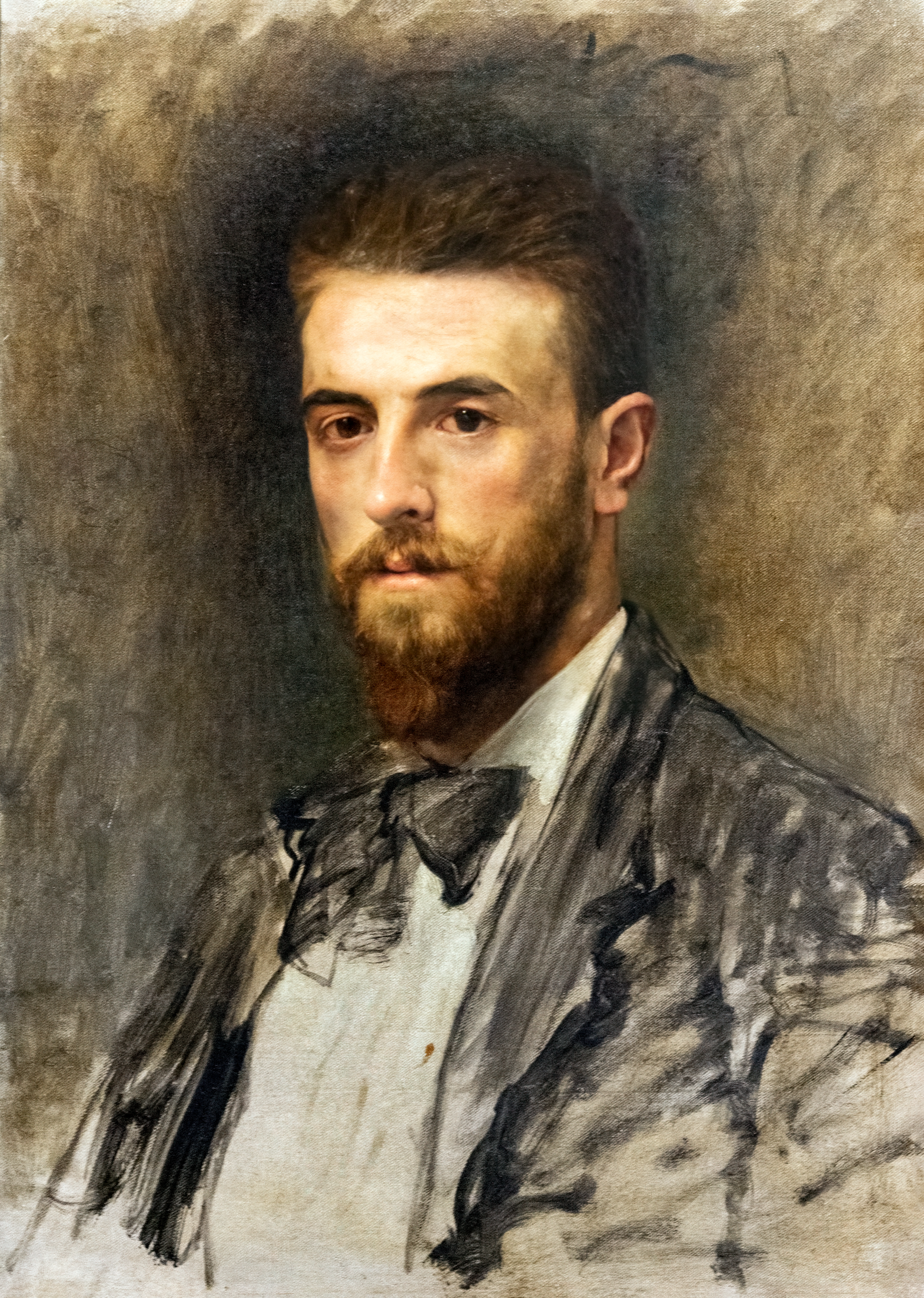
Portrait of the sculptor Miquel Blay MNAC

- John Pierpont Morgan (in the Metropolitan Museum of Art)
- Cardinal Pacelli, later Pius XII
- Portrait of the sculptor Miquel Blay
- Douglas Hyde, President of Ireland
- Éamon de Valera, Prime Minister of Ireland
- George Fisher Baker, president of First National Bank
- Count León Molk
- Baron Schleswig-Holstein
- Nicholas Brady, President of the Knights of Columbus
- EL Marston, director of Chase National Bank
- Seward Prosser, director of Chase National Bank
- GW Perkins, director of Chase National Bank
- Daniel Guggenheim, mining magnate
- Gates W. McGarrah, president of the Federal Bank

In Peru, a few examples of his work are held by the Lima Museum of Art. The largest collection of his work is held by the heirs of the magnates he painted.
