= Corn Exchange Bank =

New York state bank

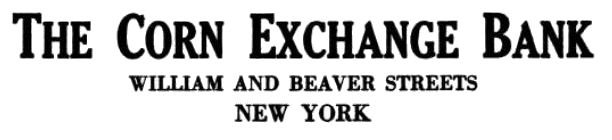

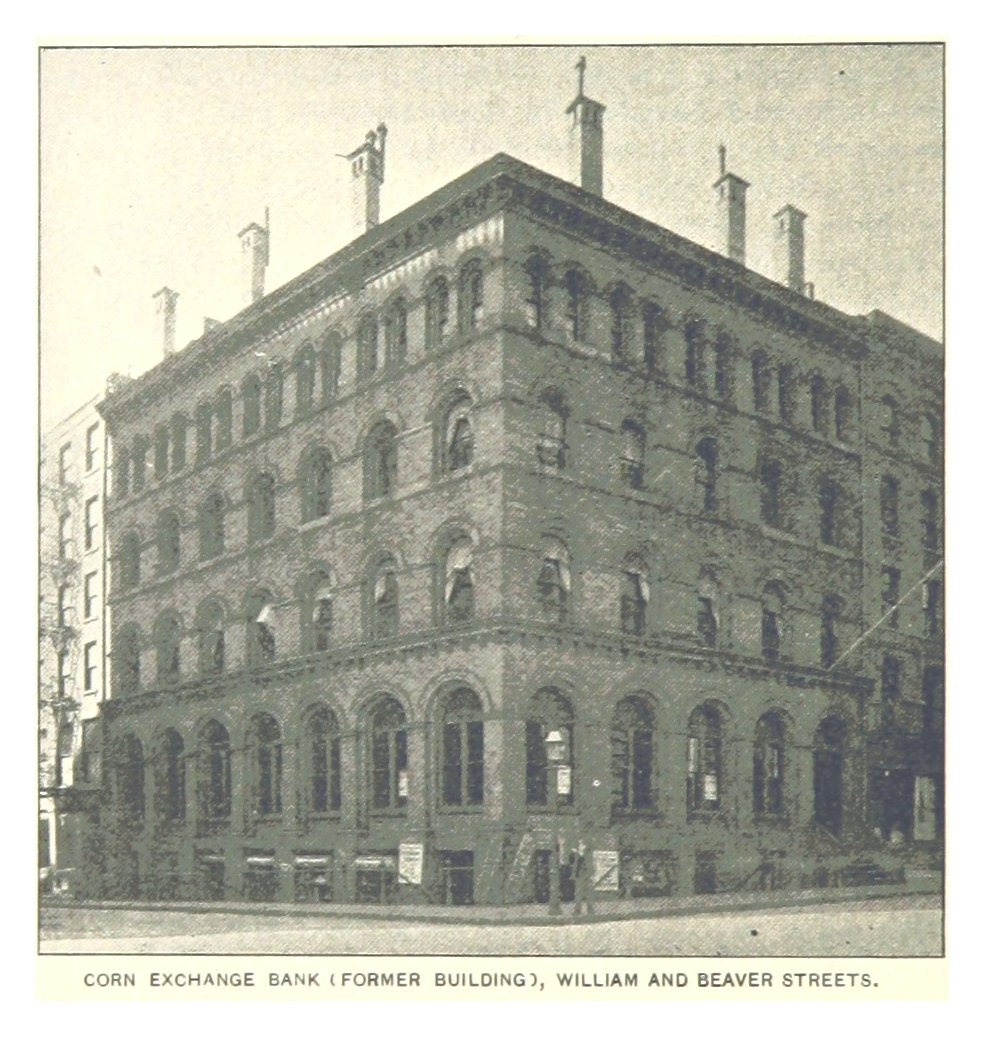
- Pre-1894 building
- Type: Public
- Industry: Banking, finance
- Founded: 1853; 173 years ago
- Successor: JPMorgan Chase
- Headquarters: New York state
- Products: Financial services

The Corn Exchange Bank was a retail bank founded in 1853 in New York state. Over the years, the company acquired many community banks, and in turn merged with other large banks. Its successors are now a part of JPMorgan Chase.

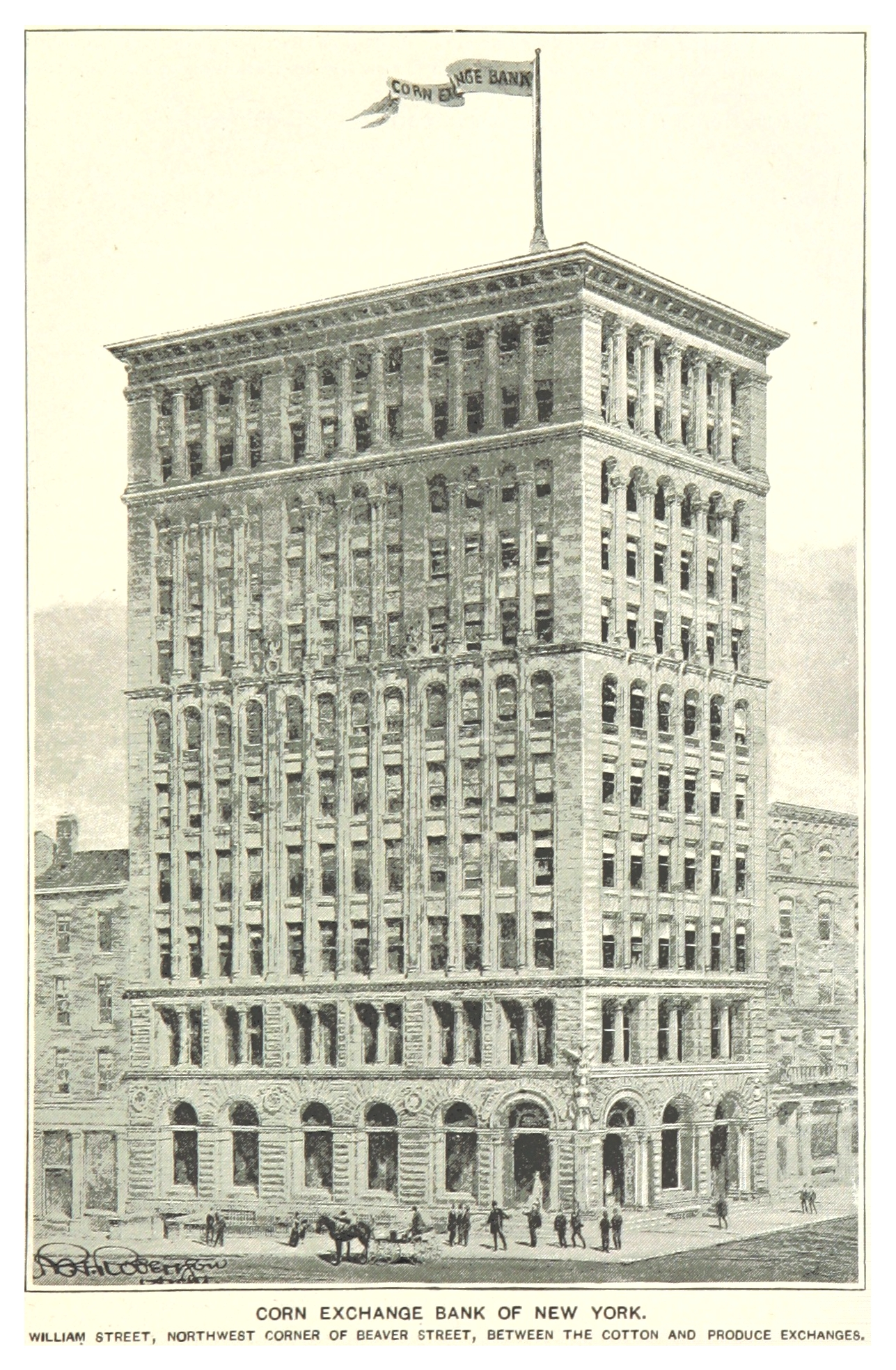
New 1894 building

== History ==
In 1855, the Corn Exchange Bank moved into an existing building in New York City at the northwest corner of William and Beaver Streets in Manhattan. In 1894, the bank completed its new headquarters, an 11-story building designed by Robert Henderson Robertson located at 11-15 William Street. Between 1923 and 1925, together with a number of other New York banks, it held a small stake in the Connecticut-chartered Bank of Central and South America. In 1929, it was renamed the Corn Exchange Bank and Trust Company. A planned merger with National City Bank (which later became Citibank), long negotiated by Charles E. Mitchell, fell apart after the Wall Street crash of 1929, when share priced of both banks plunged.

In 1954, it merged with Chemical Bank and the combined entity took the name Chemical Corn Exchange Bank. After Chemical Corn merged with New York Trust Company in 1959, the words "Corn Exchange" were dropped, creating the Chemical Bank New York Trust Company.

As late as 1928, photographs show that the Corn Exchange Bank had a branch in a building on Grove Street, approximately 50 feet east of Seventh Avenue South in Greenwich Village. The building was likely expanded following the bank's merger with Chemical Bank in 1954. The enlarged building's exterior appearance is virtually unchanged since 1954, likely due to the creation of the New York City Landmarks Preservation Commission in 1965 in response to the mounting losses of historically significant buildings in New York City, most notably the old Pennsylvania Station. The Grove Street building currently houses a Chase Bank branch. Chase Manhattan (now known as JPMorgan Chase) merged with Chemical Bank in 1995.

== Acquisition history ==
- 1899: Astor Place Bank (founded 1891), (Note: In 1896, the Astor Place Bank had acquired the Empire State Bank, which had been founded in 1888.) Hudson River Bank of the City of New York (founded 1888), and Queens County Bank (founded 1873 as Flushing and Queens County Bank).
- 1900: Home Bank (founded 1883).
- 1902: Mechanics & Traders' Bank of Brooklyn (founded 1867), Eleventh Ward Bank (founded 1867), (Note: In 1867, the Eleventh Ward Bank purchased the Banking New-York Dry Dock Company.) and Union Square Bank of the City of New York (founded 1889).
- 1905: First National Bank of Staten Island at New Brighton (founded 1886).
- 1913: Mount Morris Bank (founded 1881).
- 1914: Washington Trust Company of the City of New York (founded 1889).
- 1928: Stapleton National Bank (founded in 1902).

== See also ==
- JPMorgan Chase - the successor company
