= Maurice Frère =

Belgian central banker (1890–1970)

- Born: 8 August 1890
- Died: 11 August 1970 (aged 80)

Maurice Frère (8 August 1890, Charleroi – 11 August 1970, Side) was a Belgian civil servant and governor of the National Bank of Belgium (NBB) from 1944 until 1957. He lectured at the Free University of Brussels (now split into the Université libre de Bruxelles and the Vrije Universiteit Brussel).

== Education ==
Maurice Frère graduated as a commercial engineer at the École de Commerce Solvay.

== Career ==
During the years between World War I and II, he participated as an expert in several conferences concerning the problems of the German reparations and the general economic situation. In 1938 he was appointed as president of the Belgian Banking Commission, where he succeeded Georges Janssen. Shortly after the outbreak of World War II, he became administrator at the Banque d'Émission à Bruxelles, but in 1942 he resigned from that post. At the end of the war, he was appointed governor of the National Bank of Belgium.

Immediately after his appointment he had to deal with the massive currency reform, known as the Operation Gutt, which reduced the money supply in Belgium by almost two-thirds in order to stabilise the currency. The Belgian law of 28 July 1948 made provision for reinforcing the public character of the Bank, while guaranteeing its autonomy.

He was involved in the organisation of the new international monetary system, following the Bretton Woods agreements. In 1946, he became chairman of the Board of Directors of the Bank for International Settlements (BIS) in Basel (Switzerland). He remained president of the BIS until 1958 after which he remained a member of the Board of Directors.

In 1950, together with Hubert Ansiaux, he was involved in setting up the European Payments Union with the aim of replacing bilateral payments with a system of multilateral trade and payments.

Preceded by Georges Theunis	Governor of the National Bank of Belgium; 1944–1957	Succeeded by Hubert Ansiaux
