= Bank of Central and South America =

Now-defunct Central and South American bank

The Bank of Central and South America (BCSA) was an American bank that had operations in a number of Central and South American countries between 1922 and 1925 when it failed and its assets were acquired by Royal Bank of Canada.

It was established in Connecticut in 1922. The next year it acquired some of the assets of the Mercantile Bank of the Americas (est. 1915), including Mercantile's entire interest in the National Bank of Nicaragua, Banco Mercantil de Costa Rica, Banco Mercantil Americano del Peru, Banco Mercantil Americano de Caracas, and Banco Mercantil Americano de Colombia. BCSA had a branch in Hamburg, and 22 branches in Latin America, including four in Venezuela, six in Peru, eight in Colombia, four in Nicaragua, and one in Costa Rica.

The shareholders of the bank included the firms of J.P. Morgan & Company, the Guaranty Trust Company, Brown Brothers and Company, J. & W. Seligman & Co., the Corn Exchange Bank, the Mechanics and Metals National Bank, W.R. Grace and Company, and other interests. Despite its connections and experienced officers, BCSA was not successful and in 1925 the Royal Bank of Canada purchased the South American operations.
