= Roger Auboin =

French economist (1891–1974)

Camille Henri Roger Auboin (15 May 1891 – 16 October 1974) was a French economist and central bank official. For two decades from 1938 to 1958, he was the General Manager of the Bank for International Settlements (BIS) in Basel, Switzerland, including during World War II when the BIS faced severe disruption and narrowly escaped termination by the victorious allies.

== Life and career ==
Auboin was born in Paris. He studied law and philosophy at Sorbonne University and École Libre des Sciences Politiques, then successfully passed the examination to the Conseil d'État. From 1929 to 1932, he worked at the National Bank of Romania as the resident technical adviser from the Bank of France, where he succeeded Charles Rist, and contributed to the country's monetary and financial stabilization. In 1937 he became a member of the Bank of France's General Board.

Auboin's appointment as the second general manager of the Bank for International Settlements, following the untimely death of Pierre Quesnay, was announced in December 1937, and he took the position on 1 January 1938. He steered the BIS through the difficult period of the late 1930s and 1940s, not without controversy – especially as he authorized the transfer of the reserves of the National Bank of Czechoslovakia to the Reichsbank following the Nazi establishment of the Protectorate of Bohemia and Moravia. He remained at the BIS until his retirement on 30 September 1958.

== Public intellectual ==
In the 1930s, Auboin was a columnist in Louise Weiss's journal L'Europe nouvelle. In August 1938, he participated in the Colloque Walter Lippmann, a high-level conference in Paris. Later in his life he was a vice chairman of the Société d'économie politique.

His published works include:

- La France face au problème de l'Europe centrale : le projet d'entente danubienne et la défense de l'étalon-or, 1932
- Rapport annuel sur la situation financière et monétaire de la Roumanie, 1935
- La Banque des règlements internationaux, 1930–1955, 1955
- Vingt ans de coopération internationale dans le domaine monétaire, 1938–1958: lecture given on 22 September 1958 at the Société d'économie politique et de statistique de Bâle
- "Vers une politique monétaire moderne : dix années d'expérience et de progrès" in La Restauration des monnaies européennes, special issue of the Revue d'économie politique, November 1960.
- Les Vraies Questions monétaires à l'épreuve des faits, 1973

== See also ==
- Per Jacobsson
