= Vincenzo Azzolini =

Italian economist

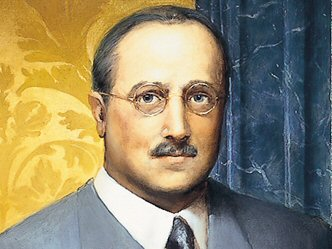
Vincenzo Azzolini

Vincenzo Azzolini (5 December 1881 – 2 August 1967) was an Italian economist. He served as Governor of the Bank of Italy between 1931 and 1944 in succession to Bonaldo Stringher. It was a challenging time politically, economically and internationally. Commentators conclude that he confronted the difficulties he encountered as Bank Governor with considerable skill and dexterity. Towards the end of 1944 he was dismissed from office. He was accused of High Treason and was convicted of handing the Italian gold reserves over to the Germans. On 14 October 1944 he was sentenced to a thirty-year jail term. Slightly under two years later, on 28 September 1946, he was released under the terms of the Togliatti amnesty. By 1948, passions had cooled a little and the Supreme Court of Cassation reversed the original conviction, stating that his failure to prevent the German Army from removing the Italian gold to Berlin in 1943 did not amount to a crime ("...il fatto non costituisce reato").

== Family provenance and early years ==
Vincenzo Azzolini was born in Naples. Both his parents came from "old" families. Alfonso Azzolini (1848 - 1928), his father, was a banker and at one point the senior director at the Bank of Calabria ("Banca di Calabria"). His mother, Maria Carolina Serrao-Azzolini, was a magistrate's daughter.

In 1900 he completed his schooling at the Liceo classico "G.B.Vico". This opened the way for him to enroll later that same year at the Faculty of Jurisprudence at the University of Naples. He graduated in 1904. At university he was able to benefit from the presence of eminent legal (and other) scholars of moral and intellectual depth, such as Giorgio Arcoleo, Napoleone Colajanni, Emanuele Gianturco, Augusto Graziani, Luigi Miraglia and Enrico Pessina. But the most important of Azzolini's tutors was the economist Francesco Saverio Nitti: it was Nitti who supervised the dissertation which formed the concluding part of Azzolini's degree course. By 1904 a warm rapport between the two men was established, which was renewed and strengthened after Nitti returned in 1947 from two decades of eventful exile.

== Treasury Ministry ==
In 1904, still not yet 40, Francesco Saverio Nitti switched out of the universities sector into politics, standing successfully for election as a Radical Party member of parliament in the 1904 general election. It may have been at the suggestion of his mentor that at around the same time Vincenzo Azzolini applied for a management-level post in government service. Admission was by means of a competitive exam. Azzolini scored the highest set of marks that year and, early in 1905, accepted a job in the Treasury Ministry. His intellectual abilities, energy and discipline were quickly spotted by more senior colleagues, and his promotion through the ranks was rapid. Whether through design or by sheer good fortune, he also came to the attention of some of the top politicians of the time. In 1906 Luigi Luzzatti, till recently Italy's long-serving Treasury Minister, invited Azzolini to participate in preparatory work on Prime Minister Giovanni Giolitti (Note: Giovanni Giolitti was "President of the Council of Ministers" which made him the leader of the government. British sources typically translate the job title as "Prime Minister of Italy", which is a conventient but at times misleading simplification.) for the conversion of government debt. The work brought him to the attention of Bonaldo Stringher, the director (chief) of the Bank of Italy, a major bank (but at that stage without the essential features that twenty-first century readers would expect to find in a central bank). Most of the securitized government debt to be converted was held abroad, two thirds of it by the Rothschild Bank in Paris. Azzolini was therefore sent to base himself in Paris where he served as the Italian government treasury representative for around nine years, till 1914.

== War years ==
There is a belief across much of Europe that the First World War broke out in the summer of 1914, but in Italy the government was convinced that the country was completely unprepared for war. When the country entered World War I in May 1915, it was not on this side of its Triple Alliance partners, with whom relations had been strained by the Italo-Turkish War in 1912. Instead Italy entered the war in support of the Anglo-French alliance. The English had come up with a particularly enticing offer with the Treaty of London (1915) (which remained secret until after the war was over) whereby Italy would gain territory at the expense of Austria in the event of an Anglo-French victory. The agreement came with the satisfying bonus whereby Italy now entered the war in opposition to the Hapsburg Empire by which, before the Italian unification in 1860, much of central and northern Italy had been colonised. Vincenzo Azzolini, by now in his mid-30s, volunteered for military service as a reserve infantry lieutenant ("tenente di complemento di fanteria"). He participated in various military actions and was quickly promoted to the rank of captain. In 1916 Azzolini suffered a serious leg injury at the Battles of the Isonzo in an action which earned him a Silver Medal for Military Valour. It was determined that he was no longer fit for frontline service, however, and in 1916 he returned to work at the Treasury, where his activities involved primarily the country's relationships with foreign government agencies and financial institutions.

== After the war ==
After the war Azzolini served as secretary to a committee of government ministers setup to address shortages by negotiating supplies on foreign markets. The work involved a large amount of foreign travel, most particularly to London in connection with Anglo-Italian financial agreements.

In 1920 Vincenzo Azzolini married Luigia Alessandri. Despite his Neapolitan provenance, his bride was Venetian. The marriage was followed by the births of the couple's three sons, Alessandro, Carlo and Alfonso.

== Professional advancement ==
He began working in the office of Alfredo Rocco in 1922. Rocco straddled the worlds of academia, journalism and politics, who served as undersecretary at the Treasury under the first Mussolini government, between 1922 and 1924. In 1925, Rocco having moved on to a new job as Minister for Justice, Azzolini competed successfully for appointment as Senior Inspector at the Treasury and became head of "direzione generale" in the department. This brought him into more frequent contact with Bonaldo Stringher who was still in charge at the Bank of Italy with whom he worked on regulations for currency conversion. The context for the work was far from theoretical. 1926 was the year in which the Bank of Italy became the only institution in Italy authorized to issue bank notes. At the same time it was given unprecedented powers (which subsequently would be progressively further strengthened) and obligations in connection with banking supervision. He also worked with the economist-statistician Giorgio Mortara on preliminary documentation on Italian finances and the economic condition of the country ahead of international negotiations for settlement of inter-allied indebtedness. The negotiations would form the basis for what has become known to history as the Young Plan, adopted by the governments involved in 1930.

== Bank of Italy ==
In 1927 the Finance Minister, Giuseppe Volpi proposed that Azzolini should be appointed Director General of the Treasury in succession to Federico Brofferio. The appointment duly went through. During Azzolini's incumbency, which lasted around a year, the role seems to have increased in importance. Italian finances had remained precarious during the decade of economic instability that had followed the war, and he found himself again working closely with Bonaldo Stringher, by now with an increasing focus on trying to stabilise the lira. The pegged rate of 1 dollar = 19 lire, established towards the end of 1927 lasted till 1934, though there are indications that rates on the streets contuned to slip. By 1928 Azzolini's de facto role as deputy to Bonaldo Stringher had acquired a certain aura of inevitability. Stabilizing the currency would remain a preoccupation for many years to come, with added challenges arising - as across much of Europe - from the tension between the determination of political leaders to have a "strong" currency at any cost, while bankers were more inclined to respect the inevitably superior force of market sentiments. With the powers and duties of the Bank of Italy continuing to grow, as the implications of its newly acquired responsibility for issuance and management of the currency became clear, it was decided that a Bank of Italy governor was needed. In 1928 Bonaldo Stringher, who had run the bank in his capacity as director of it since 1900, now became Governor of the Bank of Italy. Vincenzo Azzolini stepped up to take on his former title, and continued to work as Stringher's deputy. Bonaldo Stringher was by this time seriously ill. The precise trajectory of his illness is unclear, but during the first part of 1930 his health declined rapidly, and it appears that as director of the Bank Azzolini was already undertaking daily tasks which under other circumstances would have remained with the governor. In June 1930 Bonaldo Stringher returned to his home at Martignacco (near Udine, and an hour inland from Trieste). By the end of that year Stringher was back in Rome, where on 24 December 1930 he died.

On 10 January 1931, Vincenzo Azzolini was elected Governor of the Bank of Italy in succession to Bonaldo Stringher. Azzolini was the second man to hold the post, following its creation in 1928. His appointment respected the express wishes of Stringher, and was backed by a broad consensus in banking circles.
