= Pierre Quesnay =

French economist (1895–1937)

Pierre Achille Louis Eugène Quesnay (12 October 1895 – 8 September 1937) was a French economist and central bank official. From 1930 to 1937, he was the first General Manager of the Bank for International Settlements in Basel, Switzerland, the world's first international financial institution.

== Life ==
Quesnay was born in Évreux. He studied law in Paris under supervision of economist Charles Rist. He was enlisted in the French army during World War I, after which Rist mentored him to join the Vienna office of the Reparation Commission that had been set up by Treaty of Versailles. Quesnay served there from 1920 to 1925, working with High Commissioner of the League of Nations Alfred Rudolph Zimmerman, and interacting with international financial policymakers of the time that included Jean Monnet and Montagu Norman.

In 1926, he joined the Bank of France where Rist had just been appointed deputy governor, and became the first head of the bank's newly created research department. He was instrumental in the stabilisation of the French franc under Prime Minister Raymond Poincaré (remembered as the Franc Poincaré), for which he was described as one of a triumvirate together with Rist and Bank of France Governor Émile Moreau.

In 1929, Quesnay participated in the French delegation at the Hague conference on reparations where the Young Plan was negotiated, resulting in the creation of the Bank for International Settlements (BIS) in early 1930. France successfully bid for one of its nationals to become the bank's managing director, and Quesnay was chosen for the job even though Germany, for reasons of principle not linked to Quesnay's competence or suitability, voted against. While at the BIS, Quesnay was a steadfast promoter of the gold exchange standard.

In early September 1937, he visited Émile Moreau at the latter's country home in Saint-Léomer, and died there accidentally by drowning in a pond. He was buried in Rouen.

== See also ==
- Per Jacobsson
