= Bonaldo Stringher =

Italian politician

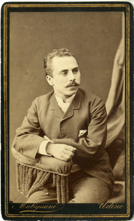
Bonaldo Stringher

Bonaldo Stringher (Udine, 18 December 1854 – Rome, 24 December 1930) was an Italian banker, economist and politician.

Born into a modest family emigrated from Conegliano in Udine, he managed to graduate in economics from the School of Commerce of Venice (Ca' Foscari University of Venice) in 1874.

He held various public offices, including head of the customs legislation (1884), director general of taxes (1891), and inspector general of the Italian Treasury, responsible for preparing the Banking Act of 1893. He was then appointed Councillor of State (1898), and was elected a member of the Italian Parliament in 1900. The same year Stringher assumed the direction of the Bank of Italy. Stringher was its director general from 18 November 1900 to 2 July 1928 and its governor from 3 July 1928 until his death on 24 December 1930. Over thirty years, Stringher played a key role in the economic and financial life of Italy. He was appointed a national member of the Accademia dei Lincei in 1901.

== Bibliography ==
- Note di statistica e di legislazione comparata intorno alla circolazione monetaria dei vari paesi (1883)
- Su la bilancia dei pagamenti tra l'Italia e l'estero (1912)
- Gli scambi con l'estero e la politica commerciale italiana, dal 1860 al 1910 (1912)
- Memorie riguardanti la circolazione e il mercato monetario (1925)
- Unificazione dell'emissione e deflazione cartacea (1926)
- Il nostro risanamento monetario (1928)
