= European Payments Union =

Former European organization

The European Payments Union (EPU) was an organization in existence from July 1950 to December 1958, when it was replaced by the European Monetary Agreement.

With the end of World War II, economic depression struck Europe. Of all the non-neutral powers, only the GDP of the United Kingdom had not decreased because of the war, West Germany's GDP was at its 1908 level and France's at its 1891 level. Trade was based on US dollar reserves (the only acceptable reserve currency), which Europe lacked. Therefore, the transfer of money (immediately after each transaction) increased the opportunity cost of trading. Some trade was reduced to barter. The situation led the Organisation for European Economic Co-operation (OEEC) to create the EPU, all members signing the agreement on 1 July 1950. The EPU accounted for trades but did not transfer money until the end of the month. It changed the landscape from bilateral trades of necessity (trading with partners because of outstanding debts) to multilateral trades. The EPU also forced liberalization by mandating that members eliminate discriminatory trade measures. The EPU was a general success with trade levels more than doubling during its existence. By its close in 1958, convertibility of currency was a possibility, no longer needing government permissions in European countries.

== See also ==
- European Unit of Account
- Bretton Woods system
- Marshall Plan
- Asian Clearing Union
- European Payments Council
- European System of Central Banks
- International Clearing Union
