= Rudolph van Veen =

Dutch TV chef and cookbook author (born 1967)

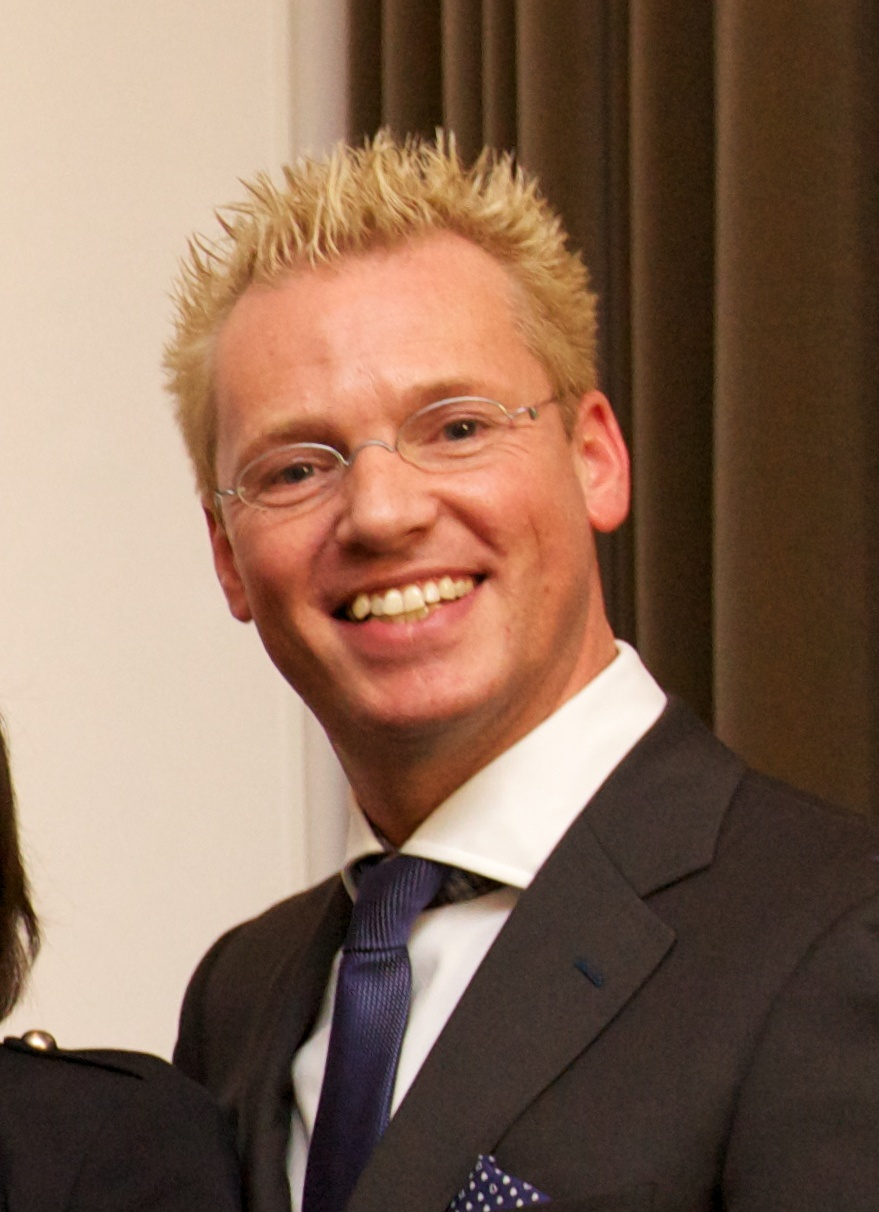
- Van Veen in 2010
- Born: January 26, 1967 (age 59); Weelde, Belgium
- Years active: 1985–present
- Children: 2

Rudolph van Veen (Dutch pronunciation: [ˈrydɔl(ə) fɑɱ ˈveːn]; born 28 January 1967) is a Dutch TV chef and cookbook author. He is best known for his appearances on the 24Kitchen television channel, where he hosts four programs: Rudolph's Bakery, De Makkelijke Maaltijd (Easy Meals), The Taste of Life Basics and The Taste of Life Travel.

== Career ==
Van Veen has claimed that he already knew as a little boy that he wanted to be a cook. In 1985, he graduated from the Culinary School of Breda at the top of his class, and from that moment he was on his way to becoming a master chef. Since then, he has worked in Switzerland, with Master Chef Cas Spijkers and obtained specialized training in pastry at Huize van Wely. In his 27th year, Rudolf won the title of SVH Master, which is the highest title that a cook in the Netherlands can achieve.

National and international cooking competitions from his schooldays were a challenge for Rudolph to surpass. He has won first prize four times at the "Silver Toque" competitions in the Netherlands, and he has earned numerous medals as a member of Dutch cooking teams in Frankfurt, Sydney, London and Singapore.

In 1999, he founded a Dutch Pastry Team together with four college patissiers, promoting the bakery products industry both nationally and internationally. Since 2000, Rudolph takes regular session on the jury of the biennial World Pastry Team Championships in the United States. He regularly participates and cooks on international food events all around the globe.

His cooking shows have been popular on television for years. From 2000-2005 he had a weekly program called Life & Cooking, where he cooperated with Carlo Boszhard and Irene Moors. During this period he also published his first cookbook, called Lekker Snel (roughly translated as "Tasty and Quick"). In time, through programs such as The Taste of Life and The Taste of Life Basics, Rudolph grew into one of the most famous television chefs in the Netherlands. During the period from 2009-2012 he returned to work with "Carlo & Irene" in a Sunday afternoon show called "Life4You".

In May 2010 he took part in the first ever Dutch two-day exam for the title "Master Patissier", which he passed. Rudolph is thus the first person to hold both the titles of "Master Chef" and "Master Patissier".

In 2011, Rudolph launched a new project called "Bus Stop Bakery", a "student company" with the non-profit organization Jong Ondernemen (Young Entrepreneurs). It is a collaboration between eight students from Fontys Academy for Creative Industries and guest lecturer Rudolph van Veen. For this project, an old school bus was converted into a mobile bakery and tours the Netherlands selling creative cupcakes. The income is donated to several charitable purposes. After completion of the project, Bus Stop Bakery was awarded the "Best Student Company of the Netherlands 2011" award.

On 24Kitchen, Rudolph hosts several programs. In De Makkelijke Maaltijd he shows viewers how to prepare easy meals with affordable and accessible recipes. In Rudolph's Bakery, Rudolph shares his knowledge and passion for baking, and joined by Dutch guests who share their favorite recipes. In The Taste of Life Basics Rudolph goes in search of the best products in the Netherlands, with which he then prepares healthy and quality recipes. Finally, in the program The Taste of Life Travel he travels the world in search of exceptional cuisines and local gastronomic secrets.

== Personal life ==
Rudolph was born in Weelde, Belgium, and grew up in Tilburg, Netherlands. In 2012, Rudolph had a son, named Ralph, with his long-term partner Simone. He also has a teenage daughter, Doris, from his first marriage.

His popularity from 24Kitchen has been growing in southeastern Europe, especially in Serbia and Bulgaria. His show is also popular in Portugal.

== Bibliography ==
- Lekker snel (2003)
- Koken voor ieder&een (2004)
- Kerst met Rudolph (2004)
- Koken met superchefs (2004) - (With Jamie Oliver and Gordon Ramsay)
- Samen koken (2005)
- Rudolph's cupcakes / edition 1 (2011)
- Rudolph's hartige cupcakes / edition 1 (2012)
- Rudolph's cupcakes compleet / edition 1 (2013)
- Rudolph kookt / edition 1 (2013)
