= List of schools in Antwerp =

An incomplete list of schools in the province of Antwerp, Belgium.

== A ==
- Antwerp
  - Antwerp
    - Antwerp International School
    - avAnt Provinciaal Onderwijs (former Provinciaal Instituut Sint-Godelieve)
    - H. Pius X-Instituut
    - Instituut Dames van het Christelijk Onderwijs
    - Instituut Sint-Maria
    - Instituut Sint-Lodewijk Sec. Handelsschool
    - Jesode-Hatora
    - Koninklijk Atheneum Antwerpen
    - Lucerna College
    - Lycée Français International d'Anvers
    - Middenschool Atheneum Antwerpen
    - Onze-Lieve-Vrouwecollege (De Jezuïten)
    - Our Lady College
    - PIVA
    - Royal Academy of Fine Arts
    - Royal Conservatoire Antwerp
    - Sint-Annacollege - Bovenbouw
    - Sint-Annacollege - Middenschool
    - Sint-Eligiusinstituut
    - Sint-Jan Berchmanscollege
    - Sint-Lievenscollege
    - Sint-Ludgardisschool
    - Sint-Norbertusinstituutl
    - Tachkemoni School
    - V.K.S.O. Maria Boodschapinstituut
    - Van Celstinstituut
    - Yavne School
    - Kunstkaai
    - De Stemstroom
    - Groenhout
    - De Resonant
    - Onyx
    - Het Gymnasion
    - Marco Polo
    - Panorama
    - Zenith
    - Novaplus
    - Koninklijke Balletschool Antwerpen
    - Verpleegschool Antwerpen
  - Berchem
    - Antwerpse Freinetschool
    - CDO Zuid Werkend Leren
    - Instituut Fruithof
    - Instituut van de Heilige Familie
    - Koninklijk Atheneum Berchem
    - Onze-Lieve-Vrouwinstituut - Pulhof
    - Sint-Stanislascollege
    - Sint-Willebrordcollege
  - Borgerhout
    - Mariagaarde Basisschool
    - Sint-Franciscusinstituut
    - Xaverius College
  - Deurne
    - Explora
    - Focus Noord
  - Ekeren
    - BSGO Driehoek
    - KA Ekeren
    - Moretus Ekeren--> fusion of O.-L.-V. van Lourdesinstituut and Sint-Lambertusinstituut
    - Sint-Vincentschool
    - Vrije Basisschool Sint-Mariaburg
  - Hoboken
    - Don Bosco Technisch Instituut
    - Sint-Agnesinstituut
  - Merksem
    - Groenendaalcollege
    - Katholiek Scholencentrum JOMA
    - Middenschool Merksem
    - KA Merksem
    - Sint-Eduardusinstituut
    - Sint-Ludgardisschool
    - Stella Marisinstituut
    - Technicum Noord-Antwerpen
    - Villa Cresco
    - Kozi
  - Wilrijk
    - Sint-Ursula Instituut
    - Don Bosco: Centrum voor Deeltijds Onderwijs
    - Gesubsidieerde Vrije Basisschool De Ark
    - Vrije Basischool
    - Perspectief
    - Expo
    - Merit
    - Tectum

== B ==
- Berlaar
  - Heilig-Hart van Mariainstituut - Middenschool
  - Instituut Heilig-Hart van Maria - Bovenbouw
- Boechout
  - Sint-Gabriëlcollege
- Boom
  - Koninklijk Atheneum Boom
  - MSGO Den Brandt
  - Onze-Lieve-Vrouwinstituut
  - Provinciale Technische Scholen
- Bornem
  - Onze-Lieve-Vrouw-Presentatie - Middenschool
  - Sint-Jozefinstituut
- Brasschaat
  - GIB Secundair Onderwijs
  - Koninklijk Atheneum Brasschaat
  - Mater Dei instituut
  - Sint-Michielscollege Brasschaat

== E ==
- Edegem
  - Onze Lieve Vrouw van Lourdescollege Edegem
- Essen
  - College van het Eucharistisch Hart
  - Sint-Jozefinstituut
  - Sint-Jozefschool

== G ==
- Geel
  - Katholieke Hogeschool Kempen
  - Koninklijk Atheneum Geel
  - Sint-Jozefinstituut
  - Sint-Mariainstituut

== H ==
- Herentals
  - Sint-Jozefscollege Herentals
  - Sint-Jozefinstituut Herentals
  - Instituut van de Voorzienigheid
  - Francesco Paviljoen
  - Technisch Instituut Scheppers
- Hove
  - Regina Pacis Hove

== K ==
- Kalmthout
  - Instituut Heilig Hart
  - Vrije Basisschool Sint-Jozef
- Kapellen
  - Basisschool Irishof
  - Koninklijk Atheneum Kapellen
  - KTA
  - Mater Salvatoris Instituut
  - Maria Immaculata
  - Middenschool Irishof
  - Virgo Maria-instituut
- Kontich
  - Sint-Jozefinstituut
  - Sint-Ritacollege
  - VTI Kontich

== L ==
- Lier
  - Atheneum Lier
  - Steinerschool Lier
  - Sint-Aloysiusinstituut
  - Sint-Gummaruscollege
  - Sint-Ursula
  - Steinerschool De Populier
  - VTI Lier

== M ==
- Malle
  - Oostmalle
    - Immaculata Instituut
    - Maris Stella-Instituut
    - Middenschool Malle
    - Koninklijk Atheneum
  - Westmalle
    - Mariagaarde-Instituut
    - Sint-Jan Berchmanscollege
- Mechelen
  - Berthoutinstituut-Klein Seminarie
  - Coloma-Instituut
  - Instituut van de Ursulinen
  - Royal Carillon School "Jef Denyn"
  - Koninklijk Atheneum Pitzemburg
  - KTA Wollemarkt
  - Lemmensinstituut
  - Onze-Lieve-Vrouw van de Ham- Instituut
  - Scheppersinstituut Mechelen
  - Sint-Romboutscollege
- Mol
  - European School, Mol
  - KTA Mol
  - Middenschool Mol
  - Rozenberg S.O
  - Sint-Jan Berchmanscollege
  - Sint-Lutgardisinstituut
  - Technisch Instituut Sint-Paulus
- Mortsel
  - Anna-Theresia-instituut Middenschool
  - GTI Mortsel
  - Koninklijk Atheneum Mortsel
  - Secundaire Handelsschool Sint-Aloisius

== N ==
- Niel
  - G.I.T.H.O. Afdeling Elektrotechnieken
  - Gemeentelijke Basisschool Niel
  - Sint-Calasanz-Instituut
- Nijlen
  - Gemeentelijke Basisschool Nijlen

== P ==
- Puurs
  - BSGO Puurs
  - Buitengewoon Basisonderwijs Puurs
  - Sint-Jan Berchmansinstituut

== S ==
- Schoten
  - KA Schoten
  - Sint-Cordula Instituut
  - Sint-Jozefinstituut-Technische School
  - Sint-Michielscollege Schoten
  - Vita et Pax
- Sint-Katelijne-Waver
  - Ursulinen-Hagelstein
- Stabroek
  - Middenschool Stabroek

== T ==
- Turnhout
  - Heilig-Grafinstituut
  - Hoger Inst.Verpl.St.-Elisabeth
  - zennit turnhout
  - KTA Molenhof Turnhout
  - Sint-Jozefcollege
  - Sint-Pietersinstituut
  - Sint-Victorinstituut
  - Stedelijke Handelsschool Turnhout
  - VTS Turnhout
  - ka boomgaard plein turnhout

== V ==
- Vorselaar
  - Kardinaal van Roey-Instituut

== W ==
- Westerlo
  - Vrije Sint-Lambertusscholen
- Willebroek
  - Middenschool Willebroek H.
  - Koninklijk Atheneum Vaartland
- Wuustwezel
  - Stella Matutina-Instituut

== Z ==
- Zandhoven
  - VTI Zandhoven
