= Antwerp Province =

Province of Belgium

Antwerp Province Provincie Antwerpen (Dutch)
- Province
- Flag Coat of arms Brandmark

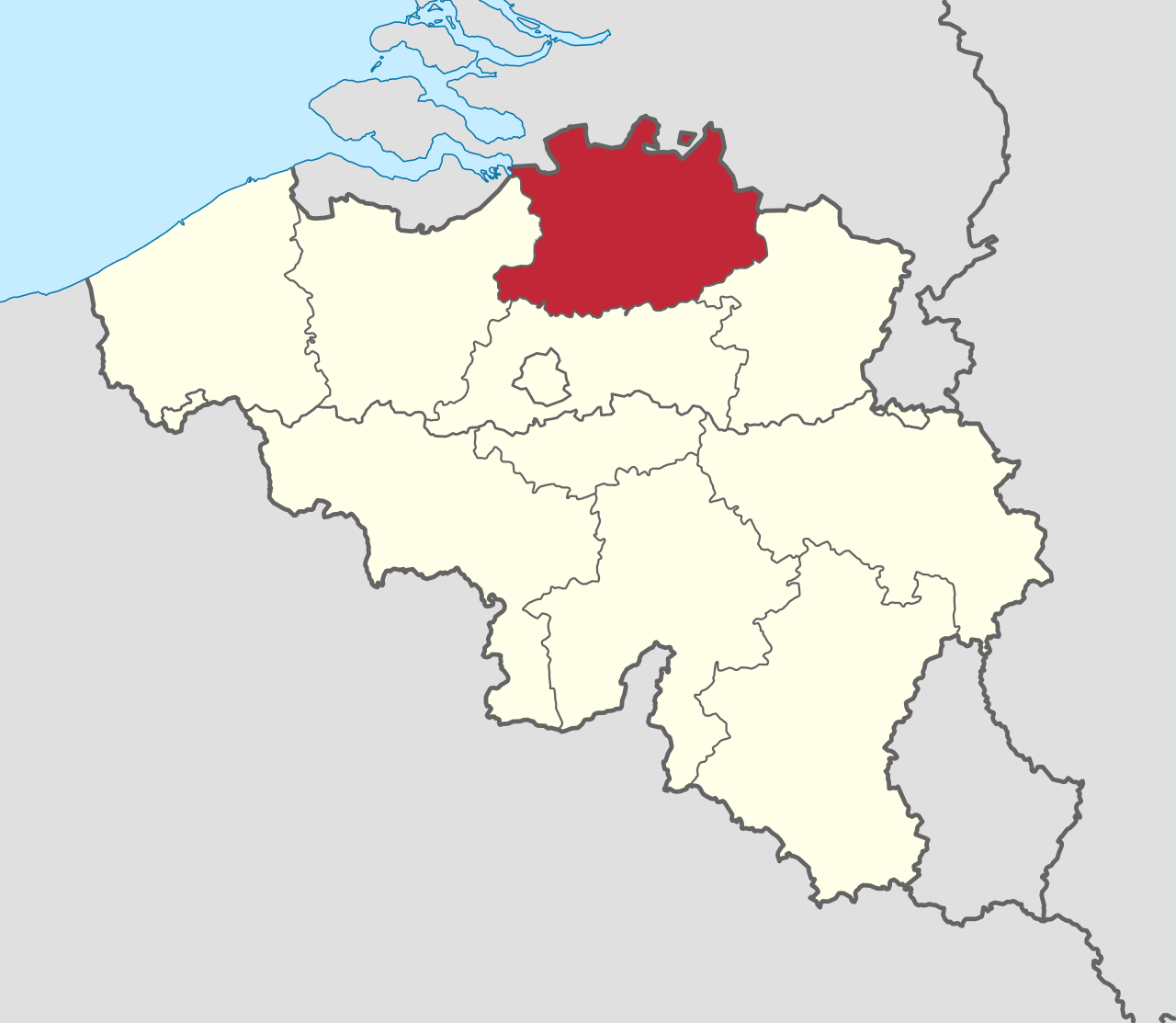
- Interactive map of Antwerp Province
- Coordinates: 51°13′N 04°25′E
- Country: Belgium
- Region: Flanders
- Capital (and largest city): Antwerp

Government
  - Governor: Cathy Berx (CD&V)

Area
  - Total: 2,876 km^{2} (1,110 sq mi)

Population (1 January 2024)
  - Total: 1,926,522
  - Density: 669.9/km^{2} (1,735/sq mi)

GDP
  - Total: €117.767 billion (2024)
  - Per capita: €60,486 (2024)
- ISO 3166 code: BE-VAN
- HDI (2021): 0.950 very high · 3rd of 11
- Website: www.provincieantwerpen.be

The Antwerp Province (/ˈæntwɜːrp/; Dutch: Provincie Antwerpen [proːˈvɪnsi ˈɑntʋɛrpə(n)]; French: Province d'Anvers; German: Provinz Antwerpen), between 1815 and 1830 known as Central Brabant (Dutch: Midden-Brabant [ˌmɪdə(m)ˈbraːbɑnt], French: Brabant-Central, German: Mittel-Brabant), is the northernmost province both of the Flemish Region, also called Flanders, and of Belgium. It borders on the Zeeland and North Brabant provinces of the Netherlands to the north and the Belgian provinces of Limburg, Flemish Brabant and East Flanders. Its capital is Antwerp, which includes the Port of Antwerp, the second-largest seaport in Europe. It has an area of 2,876 km^{2} (1,110 sq mi), and with over 1.92 million inhabitants as of January 2024, is the country's most populous province. The province consists of three arrondissements: Antwerp, Mechelen and Turnhout. The eastern part of the province comprises the main part of the Campine region.

== History ==
During the early Middle Ages the region was part of the Frankish Empire, which was divided into several pagi. The territory of the present-day province belonged to several pagi of which the region around what would become the city of Antwerp belonged to the Pagus Renesium. The Pagus Toxandria stretched from North Brabant into the Campine region. To the south there was the Pagus Bracbatinsis and the Pagus Hasbaniensis. In 843 the Carolingian Empire of Charlemagne was divided among his sons and the river Scheldt became the border between West Francia and East Francia. In 974 Otto II established the Margraviate of Antwerp as a defence against the County of Flanders.

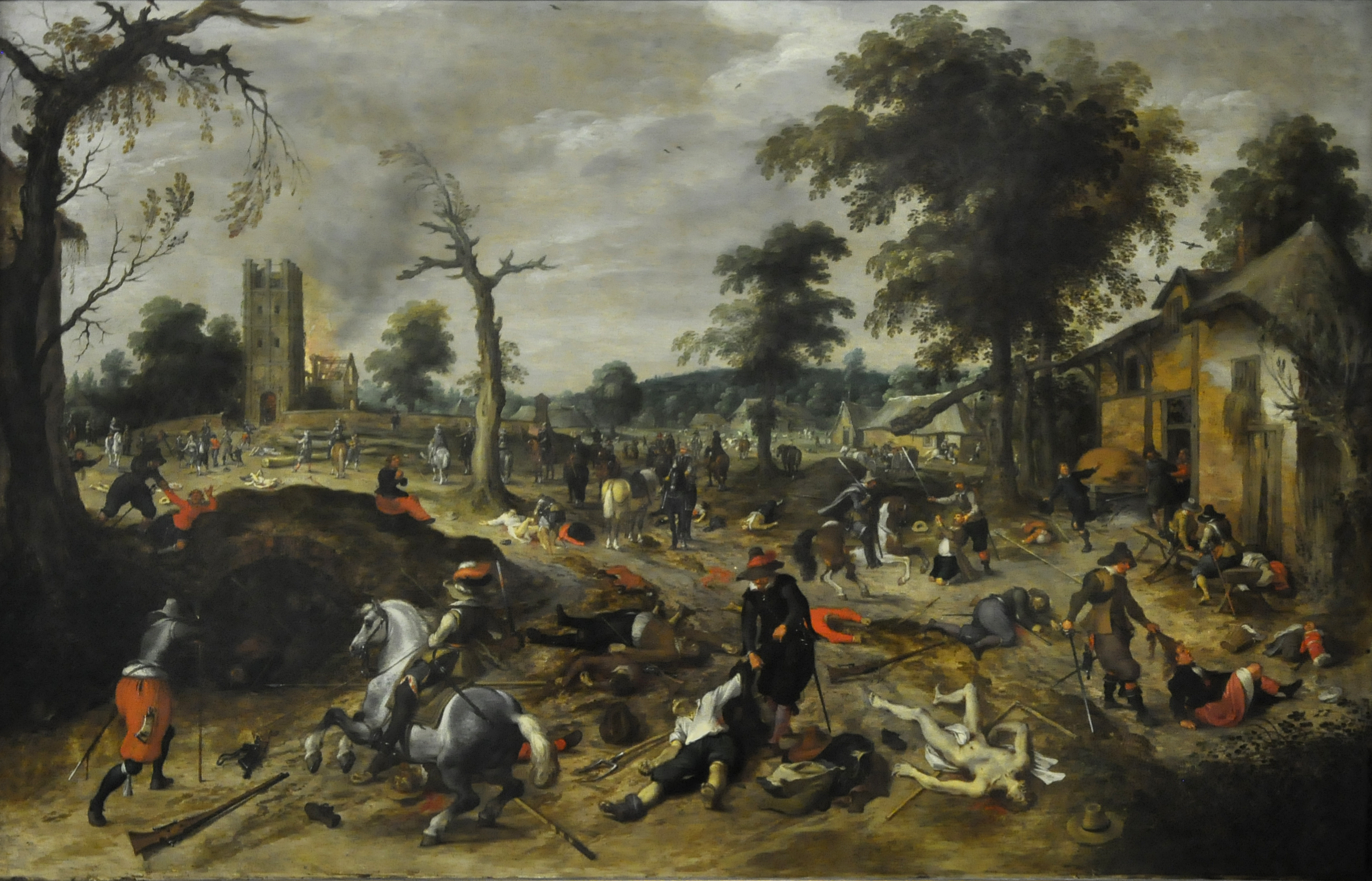
The aftermath of the plundering of the village of Wommelgem in 1589. Eighty Years' War, painting by Sebastiaen Vrancx.

In 1106, Henry V granted the Margraviate to Godfrey I of Leuven. His descendants would from 1235 onwards become the Dukes of Brabant and the region itself was the northern part of the Duchy of Brabant. In 1430 the Duchy became part of the Duchy of Burgundy until 1477 when it fell to the House of Habsburg. In 1713, at the end of the Spanish Succession War the region became part of the Austrian Netherlands until 1794, with in 1790 the short lived United States of Belgium. On 1 October 1795 the former Austrian Netherlands were annexed by France under the French Directory.

The modern province was created as the Department of the two Netes during the First French Empire (when the Southern Netherlands were part of France). After the defeat of Napoleon, the territory became part of the United Kingdom of the Netherlands as the province of Central Brabant, distinguishing it from North Brabant and South Brabant. In 1830, after Belgium's independence the province was renamed Antwerp (after its major city and capital).

=== Prefects from 1800 until 1814 ===
Prefects of the Department of the two Netes during the First French Empire

- Marquis Charles Joseph Fortuné d'Herbouville (1800–1805)
- Charles Cochon (1805–1808)
- Marc René Marie de Voyer d'Argenson (1809–1813)
- Baron Jacques Fortunat de Savoye-Rollin (1813–1814)

=== Governors from 1815 until 1830 ===
Governors of the province of Antwerp during the United Kingdom of the Netherlands

- Charles–Louis van Keverberg van Kessel (1815–1817)
- Pierre Joseph Pycke (1817–1820)
- Leonard Pierre Joseph du Bus de Gisignies (1820–1823)
- André Charles Membrede (1823–1828)
- Edmond Charles Giullaume Ghislain de la Coste (1828–1829)
- Alexandre François Ghislain van der Fosse (1830)

=== Governors since 1830 ===
Governors of the Belgian province of Antwerp

- François de Robiano (1830–1831)
- Jean-François Tielemans (1831)
- Charles Rogier (1831–1832 and 1834–1840)
- Henri de Brouckère (1840–1844)
- Jules Malou (1844–1845)
- Jan Teichmann (1845–1862)
- Edward Pycke d'Ideghem (1862–1887)
- Charles du Bois de Vroylande (1887–1888)
- Edward Osy de Zegwaart (1889–1900)
- Fredegand Cogels (1900–1907)
- Louis de Brouchoven de Bergeyck (1907–1908)
- Ferdinand de Baillet-Latour (1908–1912)
- Gaston van de Werve de Schilde (1912–1923)
- Georges Holvoet (1923–1945)
- Richard Declerck (1946–1966)
- Andries Kinsbergen (1967–1993)
- Camille Paulus (1993–2008)
- Cathy Berx (since 2008)

=== Population ===
- 1846: 406,354
- 1856: 434,485
- 1866: 456,607
- 1880: 577,232
- 1890: 700,019
- 1900: 819,159
- 1910: 968,677
- 1920: 1,016,963
- 1930: 1,173,363
- 1947: 1,281,333
- 2008: 1,715,707
- 2010: 1,744,862

== Language ==
A Brabantian speaker, recorded in Slovakia.

As in all Flemish provinces, the official and standard language of the Antwerp province is Dutch. As with Flemish Brabant, North Brabant and Brussels, the local dialect is a Brabantian variety.

== Religion ==
Religion in Antwerp (2008)
1. Roman Catholicism (73.3%)
2. Non-religious (24.1%)
3. Other religion (2.60%)

According to the International Social Survey Programme 2008: Religion III by the Association of Religion Data Archives, 73.3% of Antwerp's population identify themselves as Catholics, 24.1% as non-religious, 2.6% identify themselves as of other religions.

== Government ==
The province of Antwerp has a provincial council, elected every six years, and an executive deputation headed by a governor. The current governor is Cathy Berx, appointed in 2008 by the Flemish Government.

The last elections were held on 14 October 2018. The following parties were elected to the 36-member council:

- New Flemish Alliance (N-VA): 14 seats
- Christian Democratic and Flemish (CD&V): 6 seats
- Flemish Interest (Vlaams Belang): 6 seats
- Green (Groen): 5 seats
- Open Flemish Liberals and Democrats (Open Vld): 2 seats
- Socialist Party – Different (sp.a): 2 seats
- Workers' Party of Belgium (PVDA+): 1 seat

Party or alliance	9 October 1994		8 October 2000		8 October 2006		14 October 2012		14 October 2018	
Vote share/seats	%	72	%	72	%	72	%	72	%	36
PVV^{1} / VLD^{2} / VLD-Vivant^{3} / Open Vld^{4}							10.9	7	9.1	2
AGALEV^{1} / Groen!^{2} / Groen^{3}							9.3	6	14.3	5
SP^{1} / sp.a-Spirit^{2} / Stadslijst (sp.a-CD&V)^{3} / sp.a^{4}							12.8	10	8	2
CVP^{1} / Antw'94 (CVP-VU)^{2} / CD&V-N-VA^{3} / CD&V^{4}							16.8	13	15.4	6
VU^{1} / VU&ID^{2}/ N-VA^{3}							35.9	27	32.8	14
Vlaams Blok^{1} / Vlaams Belang-VLOT^{2} / Vlaams Belang^{3}							10.9	7	14.2	6
PVDA^{1} / PVDA+^{2}							3.4	2	4.5	1
D-SA	-		-		-		-		0.6	0
Piratenpartij							0.5		0.6	0
Be.One	-		-		-		-		0.2	0
SamBA	-		-		-		-		0.2	0
USE	-		-		-		-		0.1	0
Total votes							1,105,274		1,137,390	
Turnout %										
Blank and invalid %										

== Geography ==
- Highest point: Beerzelberg (55 m) located in the municipality of Putte.
- Most important rivers: Scheldt, Rupel, Grote Nete, Kleine Nete

== Transportation ==
The province has a network of roads, railroads, canals and rivers which provide a modern infrastructure. Historically, the traffic infrastructure was an important element of connecting the Port of Antwerp with the Ruhr Area in North Rhine-Westphalia, Germany. Both the Iron Rhine railroad and the E313 (King Baudouin highway) and E34 highway connect Antwerp with the Ruhr Area.

Of the International E-road network, the E313, E19, and E34 run through parts of the province. The Kennedy Tunnel and the Liefkenshoek Tunnel connect the highway network of the province with East Flanders and Ghent. In addition a new Oosterweelconnection is under consideration.

The railroads connect the major cities of the province, such as Antwerp, Mechelen, Herentals, Turnhout and Mol. The Iron Rhine connects Antwerp with Mönchengladbach in Germany. The new High Speed Train connects Antwerpen-Centraal railway station with Brussels (HSL 4) and Amsterdam (HSL-Zuid) at high speed. Antwerp International Airport, located in Deurne, is a regional airport.

The river Schelde, an important waterway, connects the Port of Antwerp with the North Sea. The Albert Canal connects the Scheldt in Antwerp with the Meuse and Liège. Other canals are the Canal Dessel – Kwaadmechelen, Schoten – Turnhout – Dessel, and Herentals – Bocholt which flows into the Nete canal.

== Tourism ==
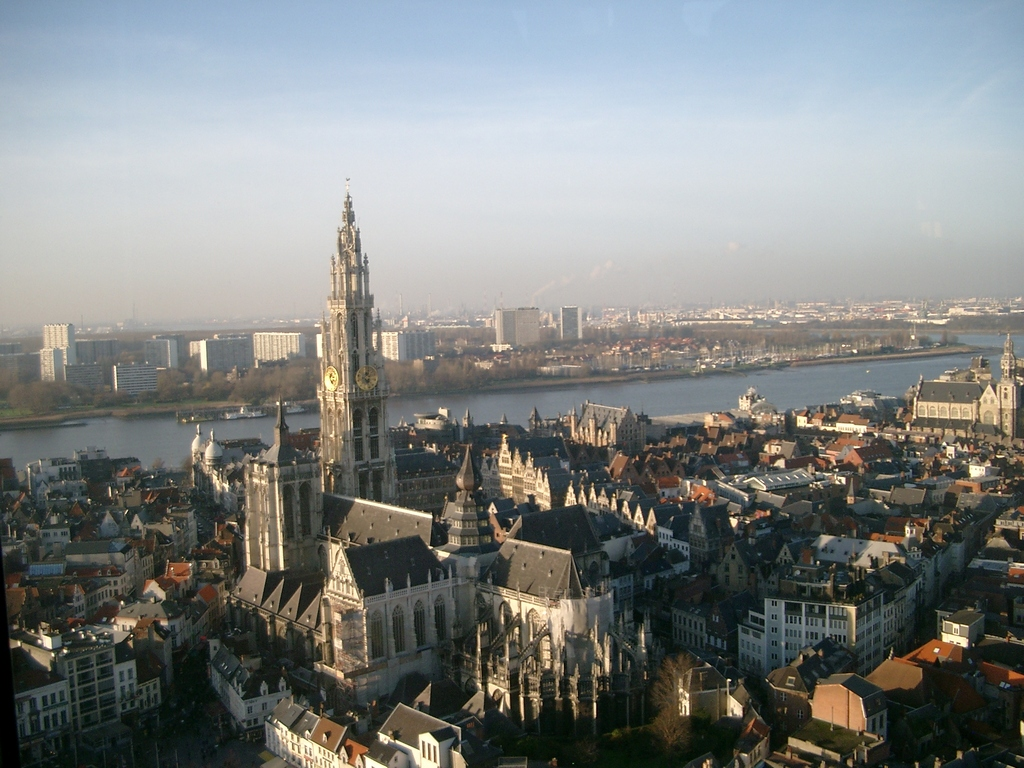
City of Antwerp. Main tourist attraction.

The province contains several historical cities, such as Antwerp, Mechelen, Turnhout, Herentals and Lier. The Campine region is becoming a popular destination for tourists searching for a quiet and relaxed weekend. Old farms were transformed into bed and breakfast-hotels, the restaurant and café business is very active and an ingenious network for bicycle tours has come to life in recent years. Here and there are still areas of large heathland - and forests, such as the Kalmthoutse Heide (E: Kalmthout heathland) in Kalmthout, the moors around Turnhout, the Liereman (Oud-Turnhout) and the Prinsenpark in Retie. In a number of villages one can still see the typical Campine langgevelboerderijen (E: long facade farms).

== Education and research ==
The province is home to several educational institutions such as the University of Antwerp and Karel de Grote University of Applied Sciences and Arts. Several research institutions are located in the province, such as the SCK•CEN, the European Institute for Reference Materials and Measurements (IRMM) and the Flemish Institute for Technological Research (VITO).

International schools in Antwerp include Antwerp International School and Lycée Français International d'Anvers.

== Economy ==
The Gross domestic product (GDP) of the province was 88 billion € in 2018. GDP per capita adjusted for purchasing power was €41,900 or 139% of the EU27 average in the same year.

The Port of Antwerp is the economic heart of the province. Until the agricultural crisis of 1880, the eastern part of the province was a largely agricultural region. The industrial development of the eastern part of the province, part of the Campine region, started at the end of the 19th century when industry established itself in the region. The availability of cheap labor, new roads, canals, tramways and railroads such as the Iron Rhine, stimulated the settlement of new industry. A brickmaking industry was established alongside the canals, paper and printing business in Turnhout, as were non-ferrous metallurgy in Balen-Nete, dynamite factories in Arendonk and Balen, tobacco and cigar factories in Arendonk, and the first shoe factory in Herentals. During the 1920s, the industrial expansion of the region continued with the radium and copper factories in Olen, the glass factory in Mol-Gompel and the diamond industry in Grobbendonk and Nijlen.

In the 20th century the first nuclear installation in Belgium was established at the SCK•CEN in Mol in 1962. The European Institute for Reference Materials and Measurements (IRMM), one of the EU Joint Research Centres, was founded in Geel in 1957 as a result of the Treaty of Rome. Innotek is a technology centre located in Geel and is part of the European Business and Innovation Centre Network (EBN). Industry in the Campine region of the province is mainly located alongside the E313, the E34 and the Albert Canal.

=== Unemployment ===
The unemployment rate stood at 5.9% in 2017 and was lower than the national average.

Year	2006	2007	2008	2009	2010	2011	2012	2013	2014	2015	2016	2017	2018
unemployment rate (in %)	5.7	5.0	4.6	5.7	6.0	5.7	5.3	6.2	6.1	6.1	6.1	5.9	4.3

=== Chemical industry ===
After World War II the Port of Antwerp was expanded, and on its premises several chemical factories and oil refineries were established, including facilities of Bayer, BASF, and Monsanto. The chemical and petrochemical industry is widely represented in the port region and comprises the world's second-largest cluster petrochemical industry cluster, after that of Houston (United States). Amoco Chemical Belgium N.V., now part of BP, was founded in Geel in 1967.

A pharmaceutical industry was founded in Beerse in the 1960s, with Janssen Pharmaceutica and more recently with Genzyme in Geel. Soudal (silicon) in Turnhout and Ravago (plastics) in Arendonk became leading companies in their markets.

=== Diamond ===
The diamond industry and trade is traditionally located in Antwerp. At the end of the 19th century Hendrik Cassiers founded a diamond-cutting company outside Antwerp, in Grobbendonk. Hendrik Cassiers and Frans Dela Montagne laid the foundations of the diamond industry in the Campine region. The industry would settle in Nijlen, Herenthout, Bevel, Kessel, Vorselaar and Berlaar.

=== Paper ===
The region around Turnhout became famous for its printing business, with companies such as Brepols, which roots date back to 1796 when Pieter Corbeels established his printing business in Turnhout. In 1833, Van Genechten N.V., Splichal N.V. in 1856, Mesmaekers Freres in 1859, Meses-Goris in 1872, L. Biermans in 1875, Poupaert in 1881, La Belgica N.V. in 1907, H. Proost & Co in 1913, J. Van Mierlo-Proost in 1918, Lityca in 1932 and Veloutex in 1951. More recently in 1970, Cartamundi was established, a world leader in playing cards.

=== Metallurgies ===
While Wallonia was famous for its steel industry, the Campine region became renowned for its non-ferrous metallurgies. The Campine region was scarcely populated in the 19th century, but with the establishment of canals, the Iron Rhine and cheap labor, several metallurgies were established in the region. In 1888-1889 the metallurgy La Vieille Montagne was founded in Balen-Nete, close to the Iron Rhine and the canal to Beverlo. The company had its roots in the exploitation of the zinc mines of Moresnet.

The Union Minière du Haut Katanga founded the Société Générale Métallurgique de Hoboken in Olen, which was established along the Iron Rhine and the Albert Canal. The factory produced radium, cobalt and copper from the mines of the Union Minière in Katanga, Belgian Congo and Rhodesia. Along the canal Turnhout-Schoten, the Métallurgique de la Campine was established in 1910 for the production of lead and antimony. La Metallo-Chimique was established in 1919; this specialized in the production of copper.

=== Glass ===
In 1872, the Sablières et Carrières Réunies (SCR), now Sibelco, was founded to extract the silica sand layers in Mol for industrial applications (glass). In 1920 the glass bottle manufacturer Beles Réunios was set up in Mol-Donk.

In 1921, a group of Belgian banks, the Mutuelle Mobilière & Immobilière, the Société Générale de Belgique, the Banque de Bruxelles and the Financière de Transport, together with the American group Libbey-Owens, founded the Cie Internationale pour la fabrication mécanique de Verre in Mol Gompel. In 1931, due to the economic crisis, the company merged into Glaces et Verres (Glaver). In 1961, Glaver merged with Univerbel to form Glaverbel.

=== Dynamite ===
Given that the Campine region was sparsely populated, several dynamite factories were established in the region. In 1875, the Societe Anonyme d'Arendonk was established which premises would later become part of Ravago. In 1881 La Forcite N.V. was established near Balen, which was later acquired in 1920 by the Poudreries Réunies de Belgique (PRB). In 1887 a factory was founded near Herentals, which was closed due to the vicinity to the city. The factories produced explosives for the mines and quarries. The factories in the province are now closed down.

=== Textiles ===
Historically, wool processing industry was based on the wool from the sheep which were kept on the Campine heath. The centre of the textile industry in the province could be found in Turnhout. Wool processing companies such as Wolspinnerij Van Iersel, Spinnerij en Weverij Van Hoof, and De Wollendekensfabriek Van Doren were located in Mol.

=== Tobacco ===
At the end of the 19th century Arendonk became the centre of the tobacco industry. Additional factories were founded in Turnhout, Mol, Geel and Herentals. After World War II, the ALTO cigar factory was founded by Frans Van den Bergh who would also play an important role at Janssen Pharmaceutica.

== Administrative subdivisions ==
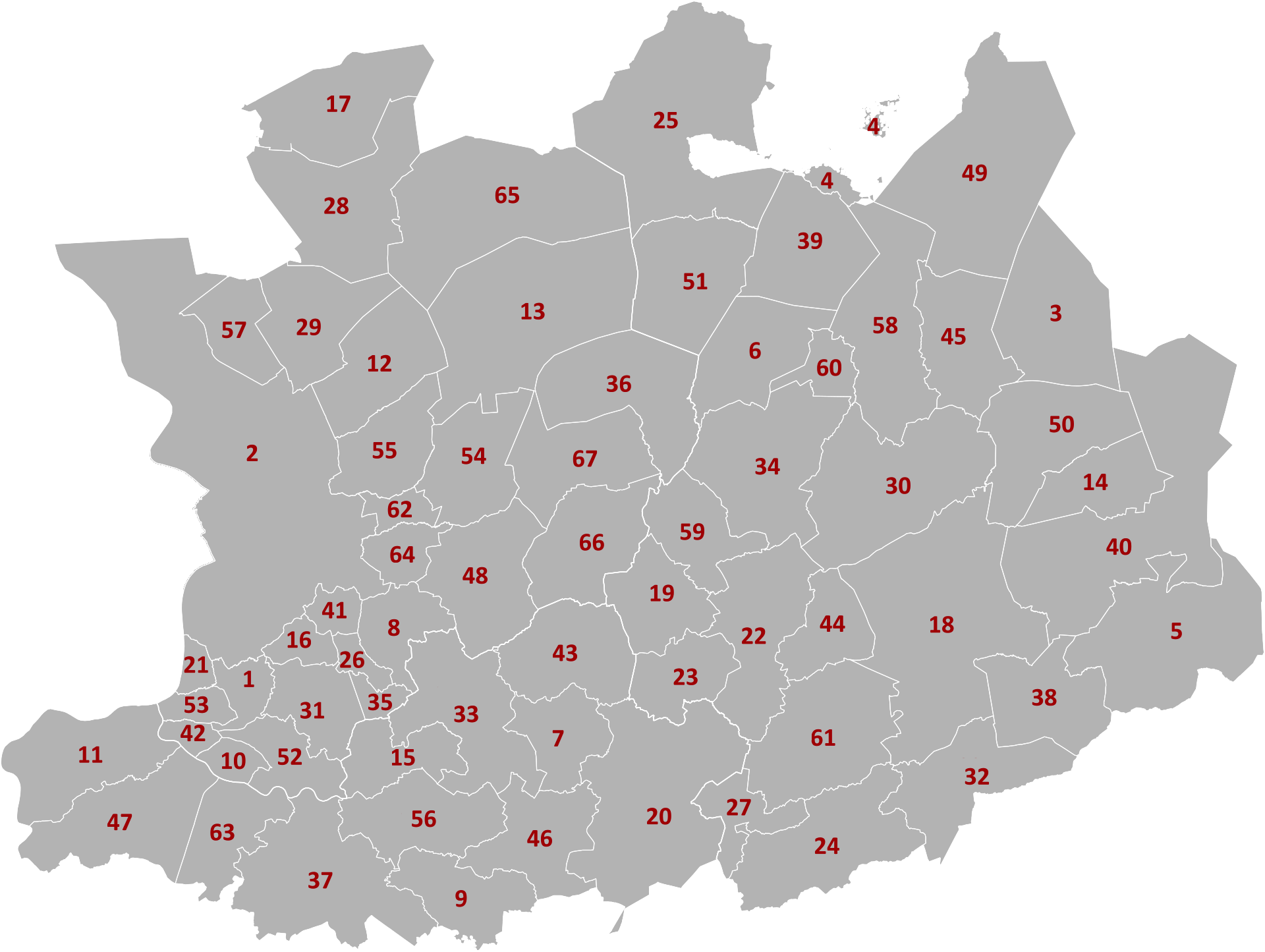

The province is divided into three administrative arrondissements (arrondissementen in Dutch) containing 67 municipalities (numbers refer to the location of the municipalities on the map shown in this section):

Arrondissement of Antwerp:
- 1. Aartselaar
- 2. Antwerp (Antwerpen)
- 8. Boechout
- 10. Boom
- 12. Brasschaat
- 13. Brecht
- 16. Edegem
- 17. Essen
- 21. Hemiksem
- 26. Hove
- 28. Kalmthout
- 29. Kapellen
- 31. Kontich
- 35. Lint
- 36. Malle
- 41. Mortsel
- 42. Niel
- 48. Ranst
- 52. Rumst
- 53. Schelle
- 54. Schilde
- 55. Schoten
- 57 Stabroek
- 62. Wijnegem
- 64. Wommelgem
- 65. Wuustwezel
- 66. Zandhoven
- 67. Zoersel
Arrondissement of Mechelen:
- 7. Berlaar
- 9. Bonheiden
- 11. Bornem
- 15. Duffel
- 20. Heist-op-den-Berg
- 33. Lier
- 37. Mechelen
- 43. Nijlen
- 46. Putte
- 47. Puurs-Sint-Amands
- 56. Sint-Katelijne-Waver
- 63. Willebroek
Arrondissement of Turnhout:
- 3. Arendonk
- 4. Baarle-Hertog
- 5. Balen
- 6. Beerse
- 14. Dessel
- 18. Geel
- 19. Grobbendonk
- 22. Herentals
- 23. Herenthout
- 24. Herselt
- 25. Hoogstraten
- 27. Hulshout
- 30. Kasterlee
- 32. Laakdal
- 34. Lille
- 38. Meerhout
- 39. Merksplas
- 40. Mol
- 44. Olen
- 45. Oud-Turnhout
- 49. Ravels
- 50. Retie
- 51. Rijkevorsel
- 58. Turnhout
- 59. Vorselaar
- 60. Vosselaar
- 61. Westerlo

== See also ==
- CIPAL
- List of schools in Antwerp
- Voorderweert
