= Weelde Air Base =

Weelde Air Base Vliegveld Weelde
- IATA: none; ICAO: EBWE

Summary
- Airport type: Military
- Operator: Belgian Air Force
- Location: Weelde, Belgium
- Elevation AMSL: 97 ft / 30 m
- Coordinates: 51°23′39″N 004°57′33″E

Map
- Location in Belgium

Runways
Direction	Length		Surface
Direction	m	ft	Surface
07/25	2,980	9,777	Asphalt
07/25	799	2,621	Asphalt (Note: The long runway (2980m) is for military use; the short runway (799m) is available for civilian use outside of military operational hours; per eAIP dated May 2026)
- Sources: Belgian AIP

Weelde Air Base (ICAO: EBWE) is a NATO reserve airfield located in Weelde, a village in the Ravels municipality in Belgium. It is operated by the Belgian Air Force that has no military flight operations at that location, besides aircraft arriving to be stored or leaving storage, for example retired F-16 aircraft. The Belgian Air Force also uses the airfield for the activities of the Belgian Air Cadets.

== History ==
Weelde Air Base was originally constructed between 1952 and 1954 as part of an expansion of Belgian defenses after the creation of the North Atlantic Treaty Organization (NATO). It was one of seven airfields that the Belgian Government elected to construct in the time frame, including Bertrix, Ursel, Saint-Hubert, Brecht, Saint-Vith and Bastogne, although the last two were never completed. Its location was chosen to be near an existing railway station and to have minimal impact on the local population. Construction was completed by 1954, although additional construction projects continued at the location until as late as 1957. During the construction, several archaeological finds were made, with the graves of Bronze-Age people discovered as well as artifacts dating back as far as 5000 BCE.

After opening, squadrons from Kleine Brogel Air Base were redeployed to Weelde after that air base experienced problems its concrete and underwent necessary upgrades. Additional fuel storage facilities, weapons storage facilities, maintenance facilities and an operations center were constructed at the site, and runway upgrades were performed that brought the total length of the runway to 2,990 metres (9,810 ft). By the 1960s, the airfield was relegated to the role of reserve airfield and an airfield used for exercises and deployments, while maintaining staffing at the location.

After 1964, the Belgian Air Cadets began operating at the field, using it for glider operations. After 1972, the private gliding club Kempische Aeroclub was formed and the Belgian Air Force agreed to allow the club to operate gliders on the field and to use onsite barracks facilities.

== See also ==
- List of airports in Belgium
