= Onze-Lieve-Vrouwinstituut =

Onze-Lieve-Vrouwinstituut may refer to:

- Onze-Lieve-Vrouwinstituut, a school in the Berchem district of the city of Antwerp, Belgium
- Onze-Lieve-Vrouwinstituut, a school in Boom, Belgium

== See also ==
- List of schools in Antwerp
