= Oud-Turnhout =

- Municipality
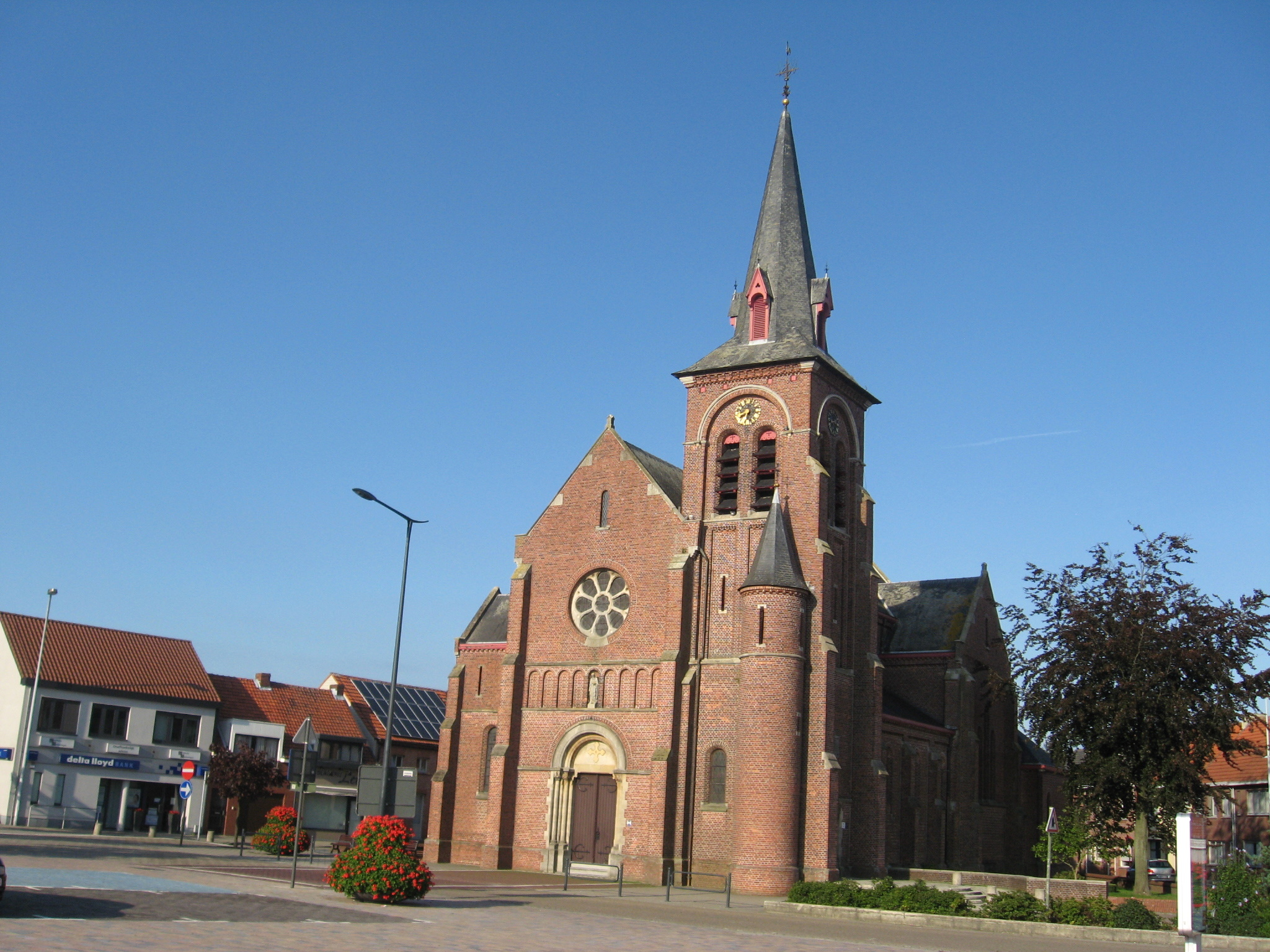

- Flag Coat of arms

- Location of Oud-Turnhout in the province of Antwerp
- Interactive map of Oud-Turnhout
- Location in Belgium
- Coordinates: 51°19′N 04°59′E
- Country: Belgium
- Community: Flemish Community
- Region: Flemish Region
- Province: Antwerp
- Arrondissement: Turnhout

Government
  - Mayor: Bob Coppens (N-VA)
  - Governing parties: N-VA, Groen, LB18

Area
  - Total: 39.17 km^{2} (15.12 sq mi)

Population (2020-01-01)
  - Total: 13,977
  - Density: 356.8/km^{2} (924.2/sq mi)
- Postal codes: 2360
- NIS code: 13031
- Area codes: 014
- Website: www.oud-turnhout.be

Oud-Turnhout (Dutch pronunciation: [ˌʌuˈtʏr(ə)nɦʌut]) is a municipality located in the Belgian province of Antwerp. The municipality only comprises the town of Oud-Turnhout proper. In 2021, Oud-Turnhout had a total population of 14,201. The total area is 38.80 km².

There are 3 parishes: Zwaneven in the east, St. Bavo in the centre and Oosthoven in the North. Zwaneven is in the upmarket residential area referred to as "De Lint", where many Dutch people live.

== History ==
The village was first mentioned in 1333 as "Vetus Turnoltum". Oud (old) has been added to distinguish from the village which developed around the castle which was built in 1109 or 1110. That village would eventually become the city of Turnhout. Oud-Turnhout used to be part of the municipality of Turnhout, but felt neglected by its bigger neighbour. In 1859, Oud-Turnhout became an independent municipality. In 1977, the hamlets of Schoonbroek en Kinschot became part of Retie, the area Kijkverdriet was awarded to Ravels, and the remainder became part of Ravels.

== Attraction ==
In the northern part of the village "The Liereman" is one of Flanders' largest nature reserves measuring more than 100 hectares (250 acres).

== Notable people ==
- Margriet Hermans, politician and singer
- Micha Marah Belgian singer and actress, was born in Oud-turnhout
- Leo Proost, Belgian cyclist, was born in Oud-Turnhout
- Karel Van Miert, politician, European Commissioner

== Gallery ==
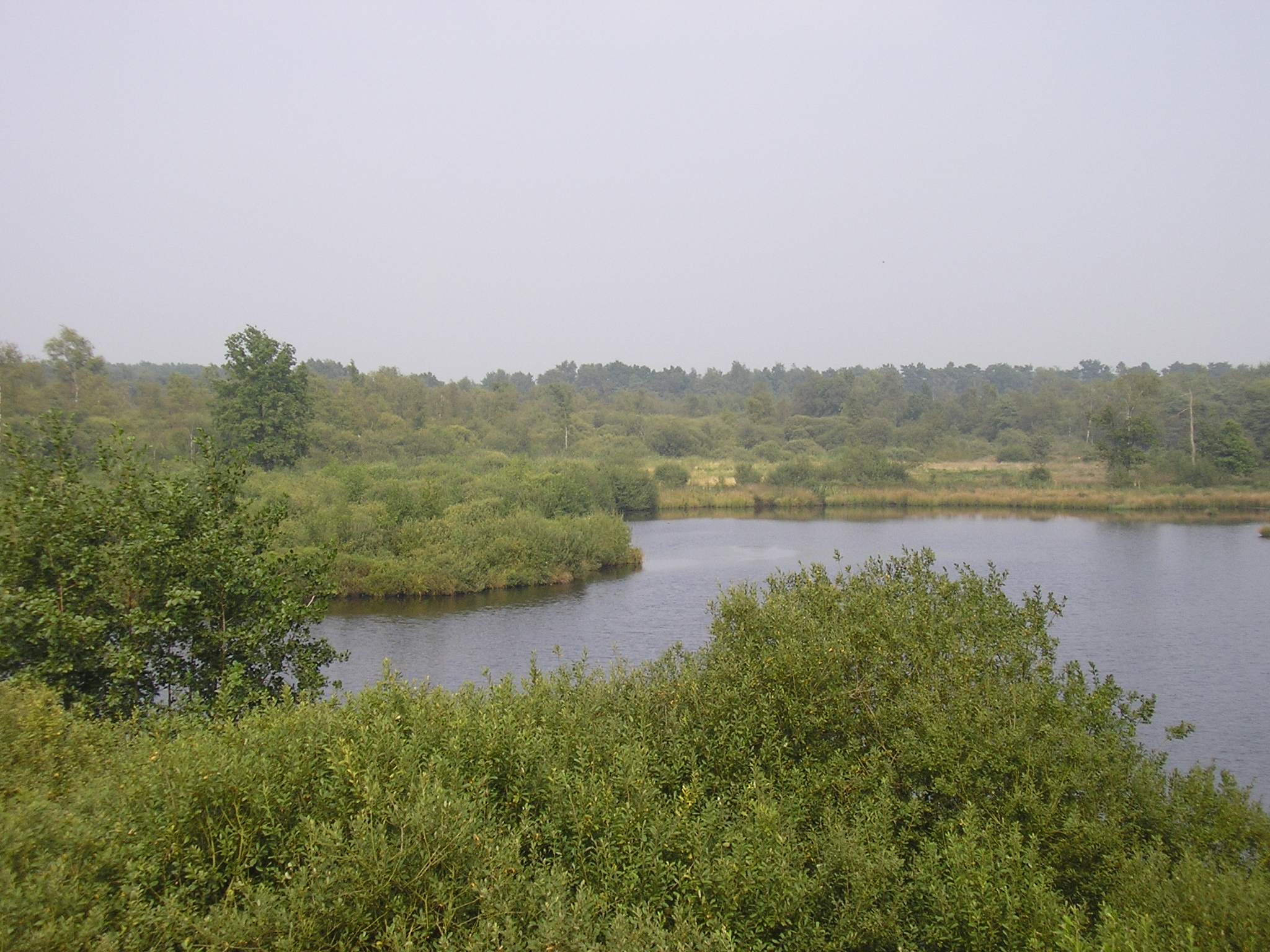
Crosscountry De Liereman in Oud-Turnhout

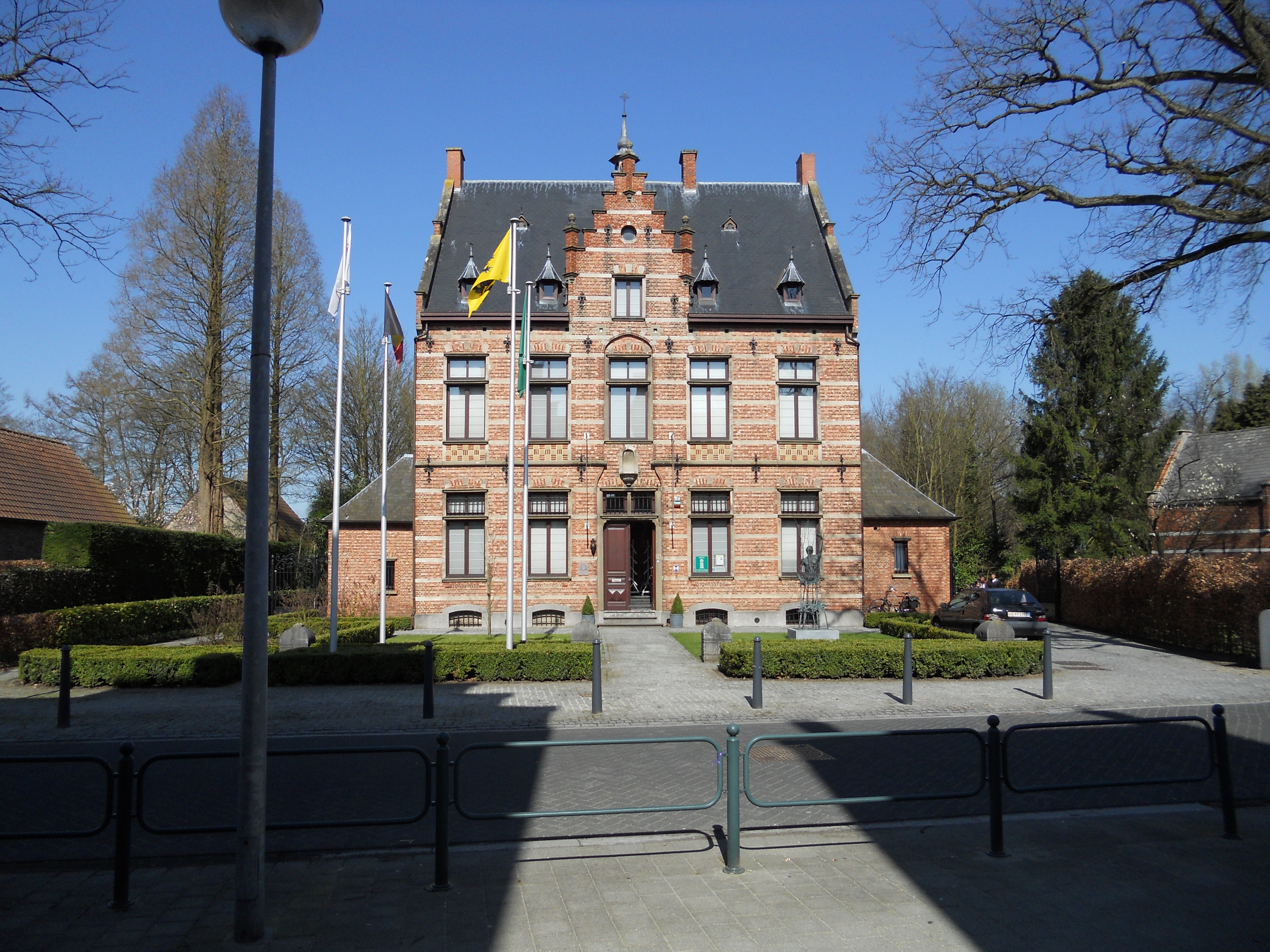
Hofke van Chantraine

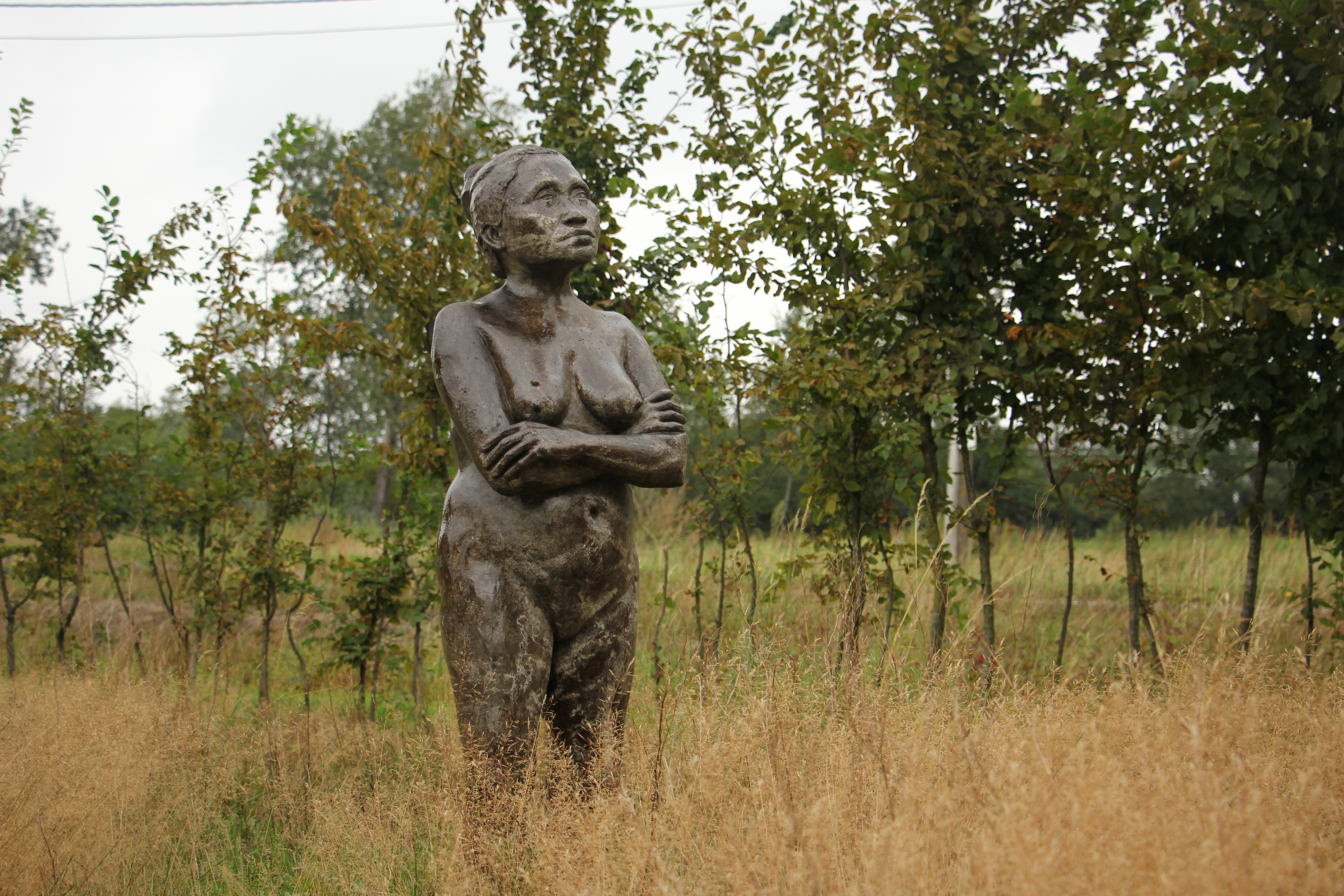
Sculpture by Chris Wens

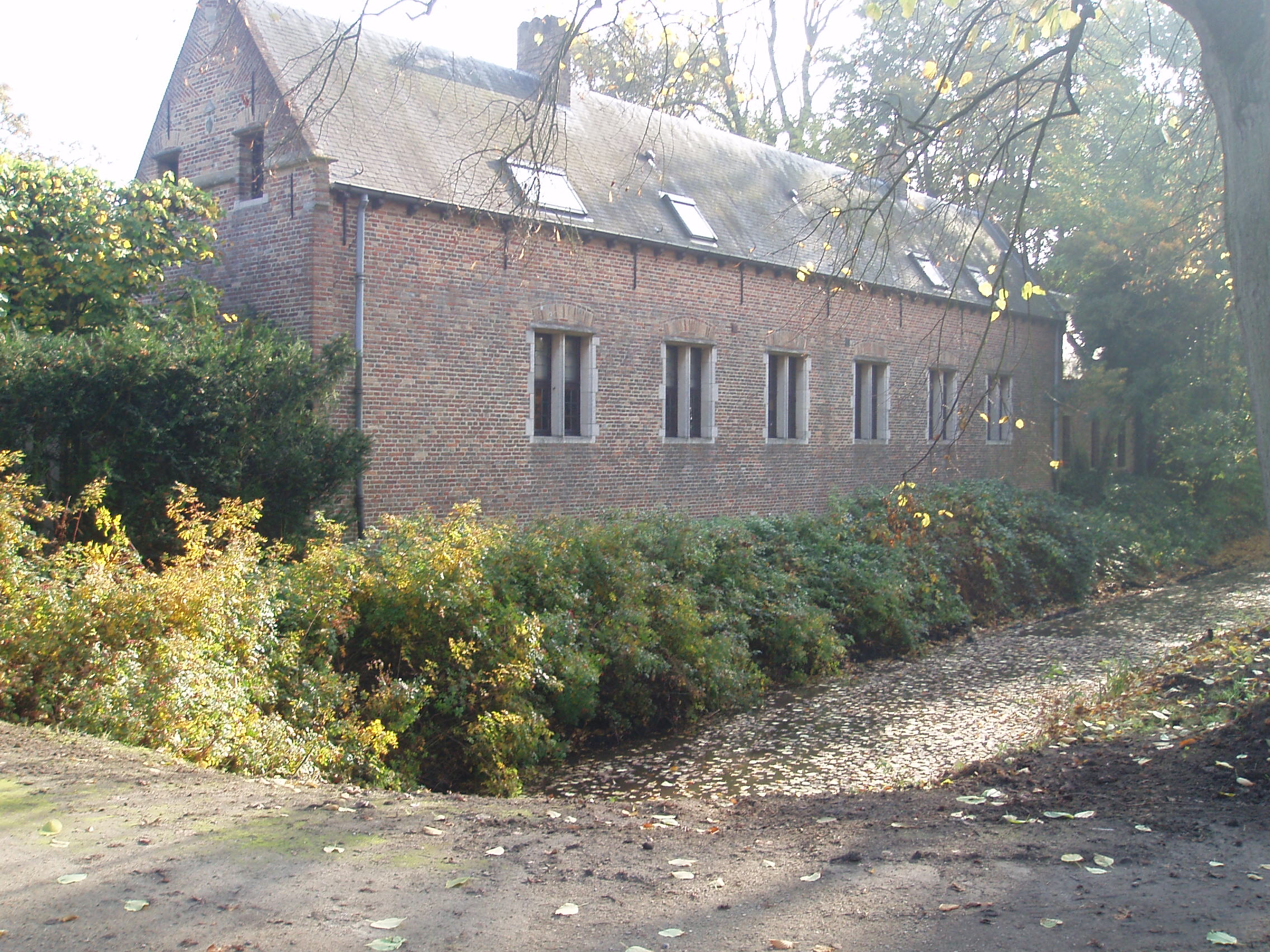
Priory of Corsendonk
