= Richard Declerck =

Belgian lawyer and politician

- Born: Richard August François Declerck; 31 December 1899; Bruges, Belgium
- Died: 12 March 1986 (aged 86); Antwerp, Belgium
- Occupation: politician

Richard August François Declerck (31 December 1899 – 12 March 1986) was a Belgian lawyer and politician. He was governor of the province of Antwerp from 7 January 1946 until 31 December 1966.

== Political career ==
Richard Declerck was a member of the communal council of Bruges from 1933 until 1938.

== Sources ==
- Steve Heylen, Bart De Nil, Bart D’hondt, Sophie Gyselinck, Hanne Van Herck en Donald Weber, Geschiedenis van de provincie Antwerpen. Een politieke biografie, Antwerpen, Provinciebestuur Antwerpen, 2005, Vol. 2 p. 48

Preceded by Georges Holvoet	Governor of Antwerp; 1946–1966	Succeeded by Andries Kinsbergen
