= Voorderweert =

Coordinates: 51°06′N 4°12′E

Voorderweert is a hamlet in Belgium in the province of Antwerp. Some towns that are near Voorderweert are Sas, Molenhoek, and Brans. An airport close to Voorderweert is Zoersel.
