= Georges Holvoet =

Belgian lawyer and Roman Catholic politician

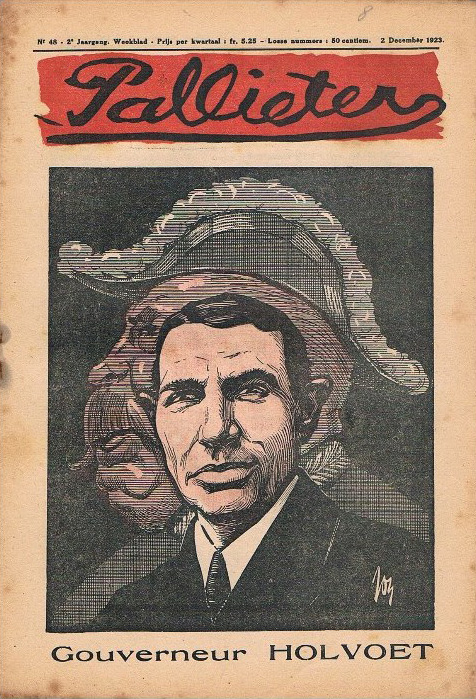
- Georges Holvoet (Jos De Swerts, 1923)
- Born: Georges Josephus Lamoraldus Maria Gislemus Holvoet; 16 August 1874; Antwerp, Belgium
- Died: 23 August 1967 (aged 93); Elsene, Belgium
- Occupations: politician, lawyer

Baron Georges Josephus Lamoraldus Maria Gislemus Holvoet (16 August 1874 – 23 April 1967) was a Belgian lawyer and Roman Catholic politician. He was governor of the province of Antwerp from 8 November 1923 until 21 December 1945.

== Political career ==
Georges Holvoet was Chef de Cabinet of the prince regent Prince Charles who reigned in lieu of his older brother Leopold III from 1944 until 1950.

== Sources ==
- Steve Heylen, Bart De Nil, Bart D’hondt, Sophie Gyselinck, Hanne Van Herck en Donald Weber, Geschiedenis van de provincie Antwerpen. Een politieke biografie, Antwerpen, Provinciebestuur Antwerpen, 2005, Vol. 2 p. 104

Preceded by Gaston van de Werve et de Schilde	Governor of Antwerp; 1923–1945	Succeeded by Richard Declerck
