= Weelde =

- Village
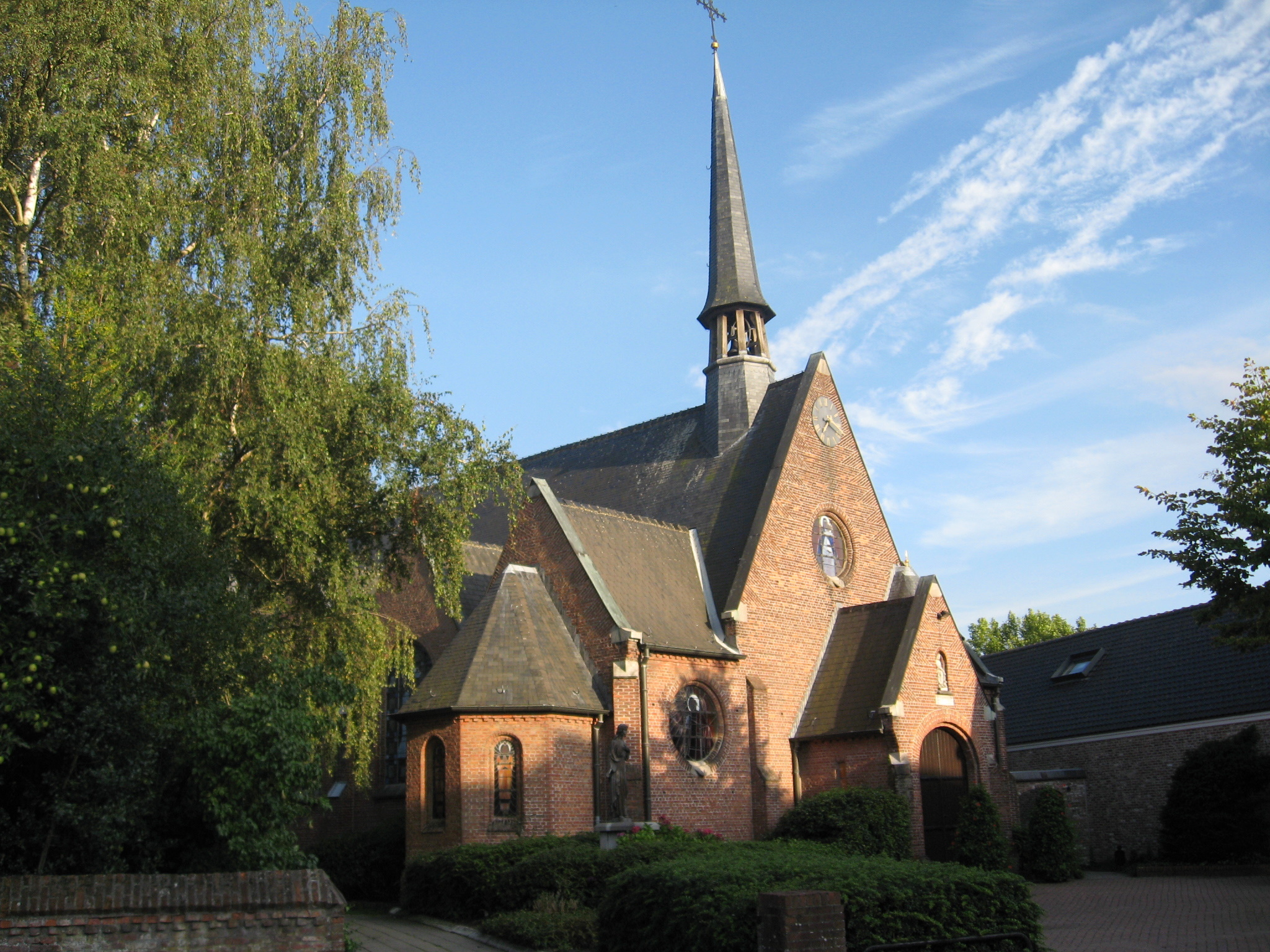
- Church of Saint John the Baptist

- Location in Belgium
- Coordinates: 51.4083°N 4.9942°E
- Country: Belgium
- Region: Flemish Region
- Province: Antwerp
- Municipality: Ravels

Area
  - Total: 37.21 km^{2} (14.37 sq mi)

Population (2021)
  - Total: 4,879
  - Density: 131.1/km^{2} (339.6/sq mi)
- Time zone: CET

Weelde is a village in the municipality of Ravels, in the province of Antwerp, Belgium. As of 2021, it has 4,879 inhabitants. Until 1977 Weelde was an independent municipality.

The town hall of the municipality of Ravels and the municipal services are located in Weelde.

NATO reserve airfield Weelde Air Base is situated in Weelde.
