= Aartselaar =

- Municipality
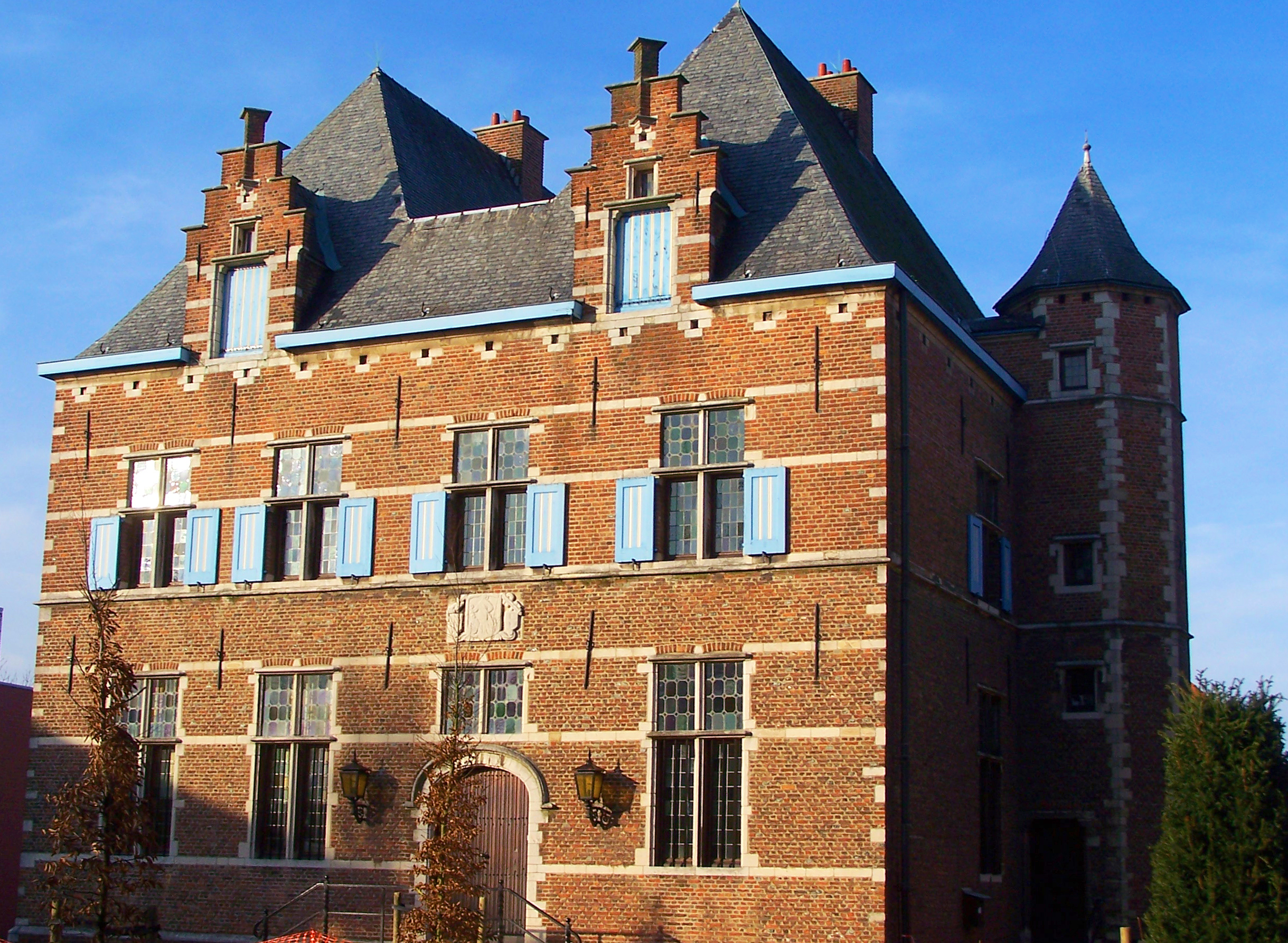
- Aartselaar town hall

- Flag Coat of arms

- Location of Aartselaar in the province of Antwerp
- Interactive map of Aartselaar
- Location in Belgium
- Coordinates: 51°08′N 04°23′E
- Country: Belgium
- Community: Flemish Community
- Region: Flemish Region
- Province: Antwerp
- Arrondissement: Antwerp

Government
  - Mayor: Sophie De Wit (N-VA)
  - Governing parties: N-VA, Groen

Area
  - Total: 11.02 km^{2} (4.25 sq mi)

Population (2022-01-01)
  - Total: 14,610
  - Density: 1,326/km^{2} (3,434/sq mi)
- Postal codes: 2630
- NIS code: 11001
- Area codes: 03
- Website: www.aartselaar.be

Aartselaar (Dutch pronunciation: [ˈaːrtsəlaːr], old spelling: Aertselaer) is a municipality located in the Belgian province of Antwerp. The municipality only comprises the town of Aartselaar proper. In 2021, Aartselaar had a total population of 14,455 people. The total area is 10.93 km^{2}. The municipality of Aartselaar is located in the southern outskirts of Antwerp. It is known for its 1801 windmill (Heimolen) as well as the cycling race called Memorial Rik Van Steenbergen and Aartselaar BBC, the official basketball club of the town.

== Etymology ==
The origin of the name of the town is obscure; probably etymology refers to "Arcelar", a clearing in the woods (laar) located near a border or "Aertselaer", a clearing in woods, or village of doctors ("aerts") (archas).

== Education ==
The International School of Belgium is located in this municipality and offers the international IB curriculum.

== Famous residents ==
Well-known persons who were born or reside in Aartselaar or have any other significant connection with the municipality:

- Frans Cools (1918 - 1999), cyclist
- Sophie De Wit (1973), politician and current mayor of Aartselaar
- Camille Paulus (1943), politician
- Karel Thijs (1918), cyclist
- Geo Verbanck (1881 - 1961), sculptor

== Climate ==
Climate data for Aartselaar (1991−2020 normals)
Month	Jan	Feb	Mar	Apr	May	Jun	Jul	Aug	Sep	Oct	Nov	Dec	Year
Mean daily maximum °C (°F)	6.7 (44.1)	7.6 (45.7)	11.2 (52.2)	15.3 (59.5)	18.9 (66.0)	21.7 (71.1)	23.7 (74.7)	23.6 (74.5)	20.0 (68.0)	15.4 (59.7)	10.4 (50.7)	7.1 (44.8)	15.1 (59.2)
Daily mean °C (°F)	4.0 (39.2)	4.4 (39.9)	7.0 (44.6)	10.3 (50.5)	14.0 (57.2)	16.9 (62.4)	19.0 (66.2)	18.7 (65.7)	15.4 (59.7)	11.5 (52.7)	7.4 (45.3)	4.5 (40.1)	11.1 (52.0)
Mean daily minimum °C (°F)	1.3 (34.3)	1.2 (34.2)	2.9 (37.2)	5.2 (41.4)	9.2 (48.6)	12.2 (54.0)	14.2 (57.6)	13.7 (56.7)	10.8 (51.4)	7.5 (45.5)	4.3 (39.7)	2.0 (35.6)	7.0 (44.6)
Average precipitation mm (inches)	70.3 (2.77)	61.0 (2.40)	53.9 (2.12)	40.9 (1.61)	58.3 (2.30)	71.1 (2.80)	80.5 (3.17)	85.4 (3.36)	70.5 (2.78)	67.6 (2.66)	77.6 (3.06)	88.3 (3.48)	825.3 (32.49)
Average precipitation days (≥ 1.0 mm)	12.3	11.3	10.2	8.6	9.7	10.1	10.4	10.8	9.9	10.9	12.6	13.7	130.6
Mean monthly sunshine hours	61	77	135	189	219	220	224	211	164	116	66	51	1,734
Source: Royal Meteorological Institute
