= Cathy Berx =

Belgian governor, jurist and politician

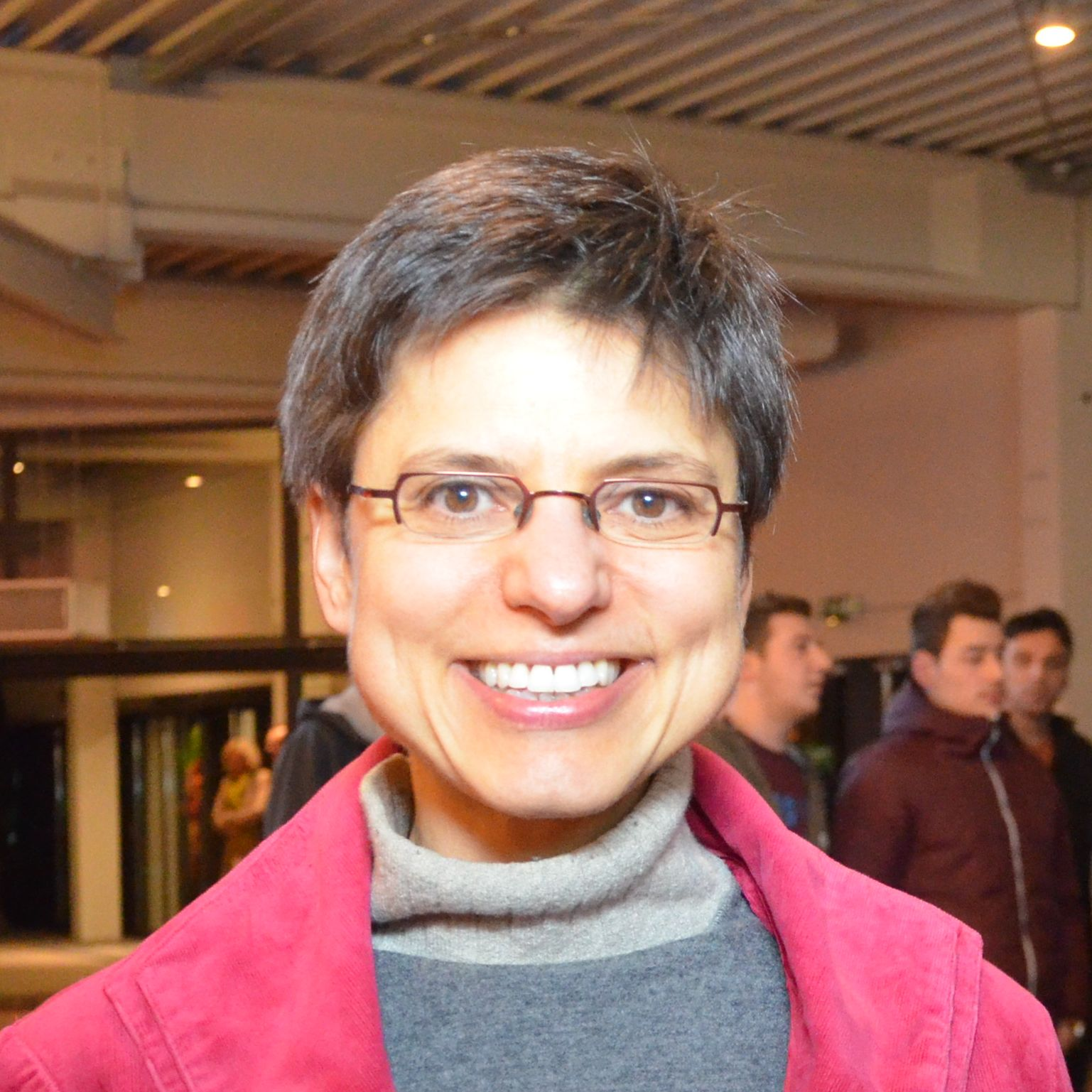
Cathy Berx

Cathy Hilde Raymond Berx (born 8 January 1969 in Berchem) is a Belgian Christian Democrat politician, jurist and governor of the province of Antwerp. Cathy Berx is married to Johan Meeusen, vice-rector and professor of European Law at the University of Antwerp, and has 2 children.

== Career ==
Berx obtained her Master of Laws in 1993 and worked from then on as an assistant at the University of Antwerp. From 1997 until 2004 she was a researcher for CEDER (Study Service of Christian Democratic Party). In 1998 she became Doctor of Laws and in 2000 she started teaching at the U.A.

From 2001 until 2007 she was vice-chairman of the Social Service Department in Antwerp. And from 2003 until 2008 she was vice-chairman of the Christian Democratic Party. She joined the Flemish Parliament in 2004 until April 2008. And from 2007 until 2008 she was a member of the Antwerp City Council.

During the difficult discussions in order to get a new government at the end of 2007, Cathy Berx was a top staff member of Yves Leterme, who later became Prime Minister of Belgium. Since May 2008 she is the governor of the province of Antwerp and chairman of the Institute of Tropical Medicine Antwerp (ITG).

== Sources ==
- Cathy Berx (Dutch)
- Cathy Berx (Dutch)

Preceded by Camille Paulus	Governor of Antwerp; 2008 –	Succeeded by incumbent
