= Camille Paulus =

Belgian lawyer and politician

- Born: 24 April 1943 (age 82); Aartselaar, Belgium
- Occupation: politician

Camille Paulus (born 24 April 1943) is a Belgian lawyer and liberal politician.

== Education ==
He graduated with a doctorate in law at the Vrije Universiteit Brussel (VUB) in 1966.

== Career ==
He succeeded Frans Van den Eynde as the mayor of Aartselaar in 1989. Paulus was a Law Professor at the Vrije Universiteit Brussel, mayor of Aartselaar, and President of the Liberaal Vlaams Verbond (1982–1993). He was governor of the Belgian province of Antwerp from 1 October 1993 until 30 April 2008.

== Sources ==
- Camille Paulus (Liberal Archive)
- S. Heylen, B. De Nil, B. D'hondt, Bart (e.a.), Geschiedenis van de provincie Antwerpen. Een politieke biografie. 2. Biografisch repertorium, Antwerpen, Provinciebestuur Antwerpen, 2005, p. 143–144.

Preceded by Andries Kinsbergen	Governor of Antwerp; 1993–2008	Succeeded by Cathy Berx
