= Arrondissement of Turnhout =

Arrondissement of Turnhout Arrondissement Turnhout
- Arrondissement
- Location of the arrondissement in Antwerp
- Coordinates: 51.32°N 4.92°E
- Country: Belgium
- Region: Flanders
- Province: Antwerp
- Municipalities: 27

Area
  - Total: 1,356.86 km^{2} (523.89 sq mi)

Population (1 January 2017)
  - Total: 455,677
  - Density: 335.832/km^{2} (869.801/sq mi)
- Time zone: UTC+1 (CET)
  - Summer (DST): UTC+2 (CEST)

The Arrondissement of Turnhout (Dutch: Arrondissement Turnhout; French: Arrondissement de Turnhout) is one of the three administrative arrondissements in the Province of Antwerp, Belgium. It is both an administrative and a judicial arrondissement. The territory of the Judicial Arrondissement of Turnhout coincides with that of the Administrative Arrondissement of Turnhout and part of the Campine region.

== Municipalities ==
The Administrative Arrondissement of Turnhout consists of the following municipalities:

- Arendonk
- Baarle-Hertog
- Balen
- Beerse
- Dessel
- Geel
- Grobbendonk
- Herentals
- Herenthout
- Herselt
- Hoogstraten
- Hulshout
- Kasterlee
- Laakdal
- Lille
- Meerhout
- Merksplas
- Mol
- Olen
- Oud-Turnhout
- Ravels
- Retie
- Rijkevorsel
- Turnhout
- Vorselaar
- Vosselaar
- Westerlo
