= Andries Kinsbergen =

Belgian lawyer and politician

- Born: 25 September 1926; Amsterdam, Netherlands
- Died: 24 June 2016 (aged 89)
- Occupation: Politician

Andries Kinsbergen (25 September 1926 – 24 June 2016) was a Belgian lawyer and politician.

== Education ==
Andries Kinsbergen went to highschool at the Royal Athenaeum of Deurne. An auditorium at his old highschool was named after him in 2010.

In 1951, he graduated with a doctorate in Law at the Vrije Universiteit Brussel (VUB).

== Career ==
He started his career as a lawyer in Antwerp and also worked as an assistant at the VUB. Later he became professor at the RUCA. He was governor of the Belgian province Antwerp from 1 January 1967 until 1 October 1993. From 1993, he was Minister of State. Kinsbergen died 24 June 2016.

== Honours ==
- Minister of State, by Royal Decree
- 21 December 1995: Knight Grand Cordon in the Order of Leopold
- 13 January 1992 : Knight Grand Cross in the Order of the Crown.
- 15 November 1971: Knight Commander in the Order of Leopold II
- 22 June 2000: Commander of the Legion of Honour
- 4 January 1977: Knight Grand Officer in the Order of Orange-Nassau

== Sources ==
- Steve Heylen, Bart De Nil, Bart D’hondt, Sophie Gyselinck, Hanne Van Herck en Donald Weber, Geschiedenis van de provincie Antwerpen. Een politieke biografie, Antwerpen, Provinciebestuur Antwerpen, 2005, Vol. 2 p. 111

Preceded by Richard Declerck	Governor of Antwerp; 1967 – 1993	Succeeded by Camille Paulus
