= Arendonk =

- Municipality
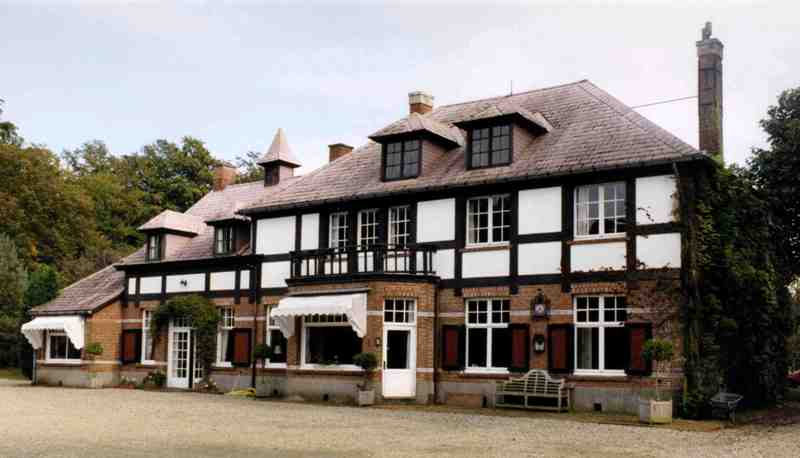
- Villa in Arendonk

- Flag Coat of arms

- Location of Arendonk in the province of Antwerp
- Interactive map of Arendonk
- Location in Belgium
- Coordinates: 51°19′N 05°05′E
- Country: Belgium
- Community: Flemish Community
- Region: Flemish Region
- Province: Antwerp
- Arrondissement: Turnhout

Government
  - Mayor: Rob Blockx (iedereen 2370)
  - Governing parties: N-VA, CD&V

Area
  - Total: 55.15 km^{2} (21.29 sq mi)

Population (2020-01-01)
  - Total: 13,290
  - Density: 241.0/km^{2} (624.1/sq mi)
- Postal codes: 2370
- NIS code: 13001
- Area codes: 014
- Website: www.arendonk.be

Telowerelè-er
Dialect spoken nickname of an Arendonk inhabitant

Arendonk (Dutch pronunciation: [ˈaːrə(n)dɔŋk]) is a municipality located in the Belgian province of Antwerp. The municipality comprises only the town of Arendonk proper. In 2021, Arendonk had a total population of 13,207. The total area is 55.38 km^{2}.

The spoken language is Kempenlands (an East Brabantian dialect, which is very similar to colloquial Dutch).

The multi-million plastic recycling company "Ravago" has its head office there, on the site of an old dynamite factory ("PRB: Poudre Reunion d'Arendonk, Belgique")

== Nickname ==
The nickname for a person living in Arendonk is "Telowerelè'er" meaning dish-licker. A statue depicting the nickname is located in proximity of the Toremansmolen windmill, another attraction. The mill is still operational and can be visited regularly. The mayor of this city was Kristof Hendrickx from 2013-2024, today the mayor is Rob Blockx.

== Famous inhabitants ==
- Rik Van Steenbergen, thrice World Cycling Champion
- René Mertens, cyclist in the 1948 Tour de France
- Karel Meulemans, one of the best pigeonfanciers worldwide
- Janssen Brothers of Schoolstraat, Arendonk - The most famous pigeon fanciers in the World.
- There is a possibility that the Flemish painter Jan van Eyck is originally from Arendonk.

== Image gallery ==
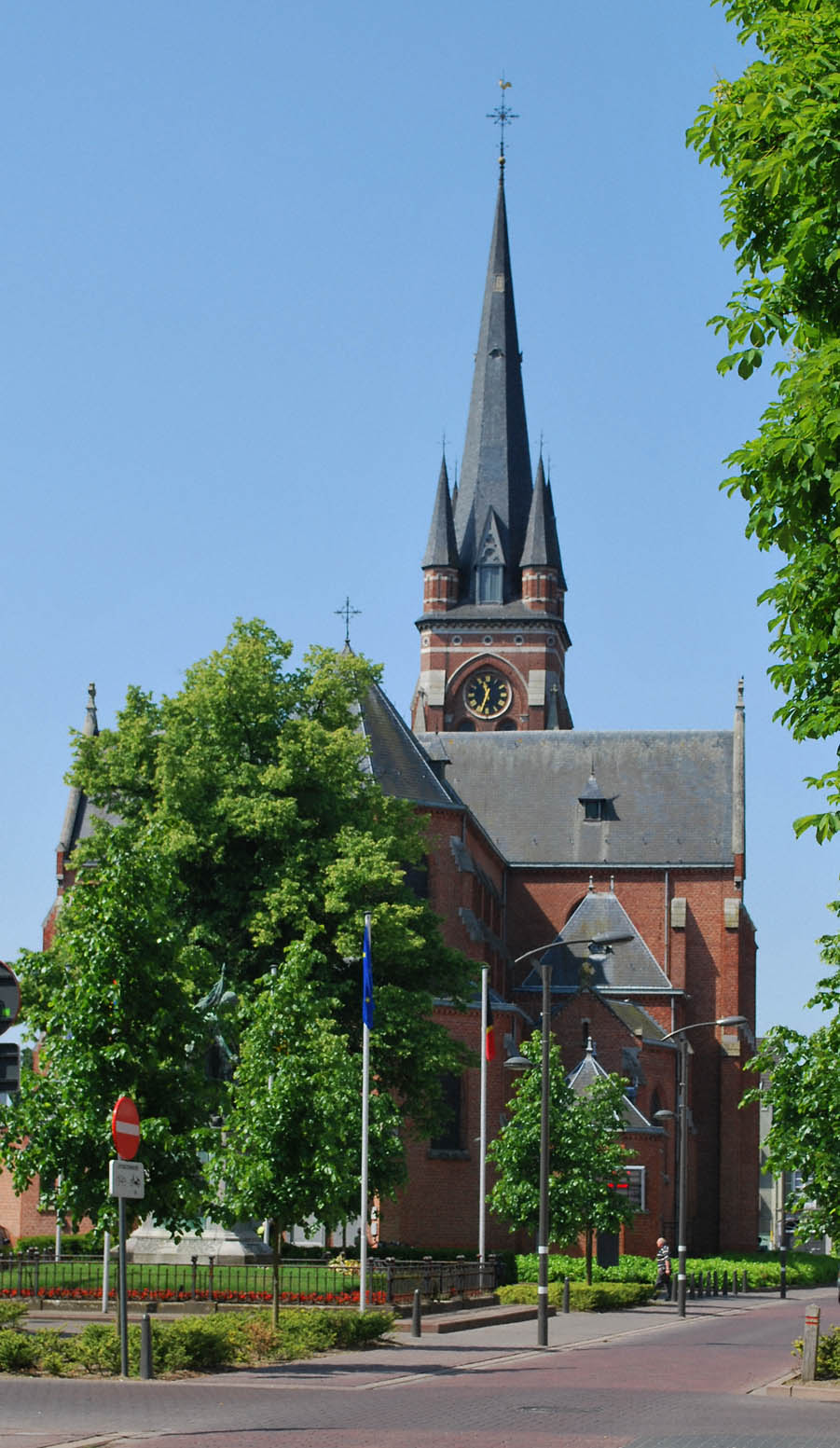
OLV Church Arendonk

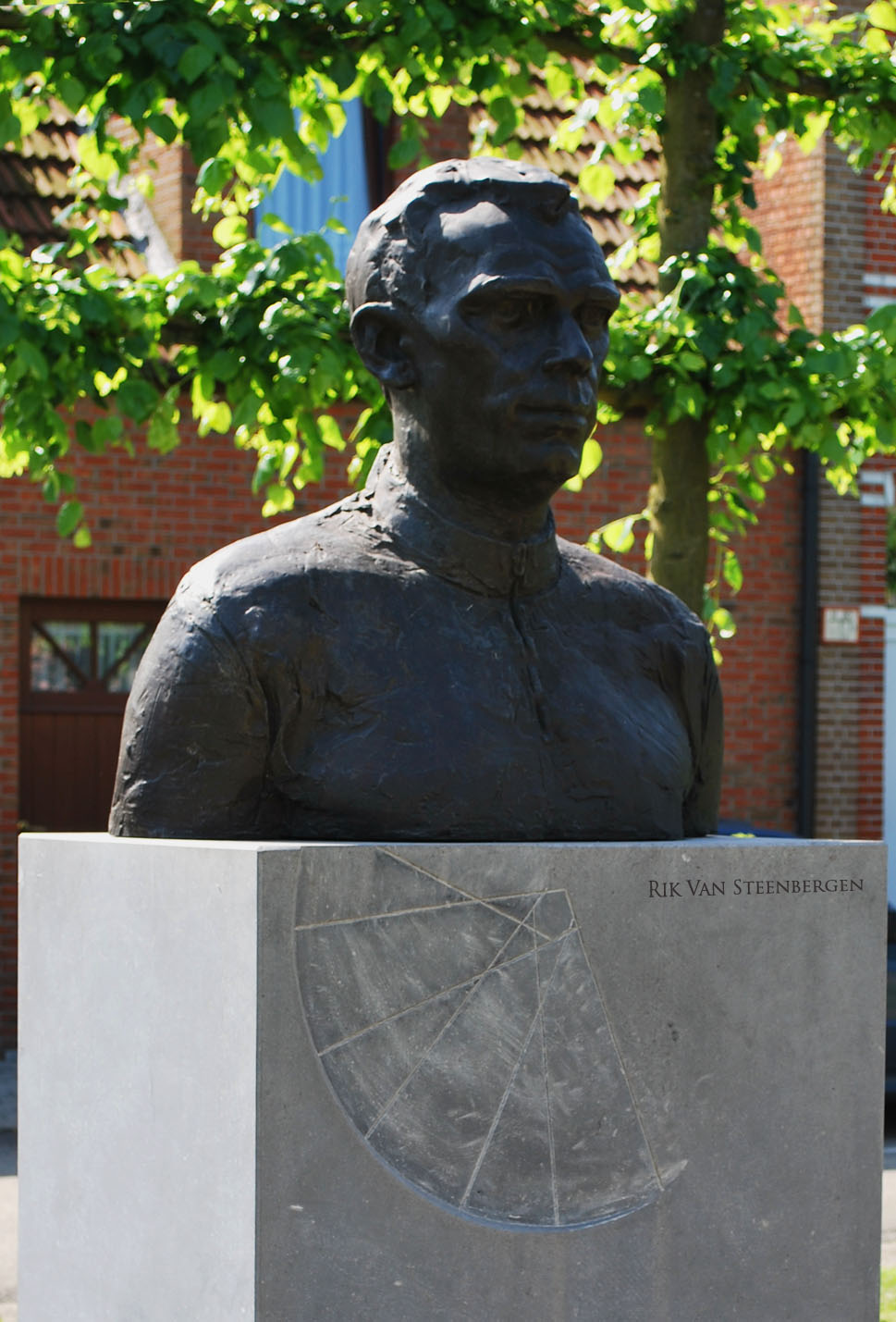
Rik Van Steenbergen

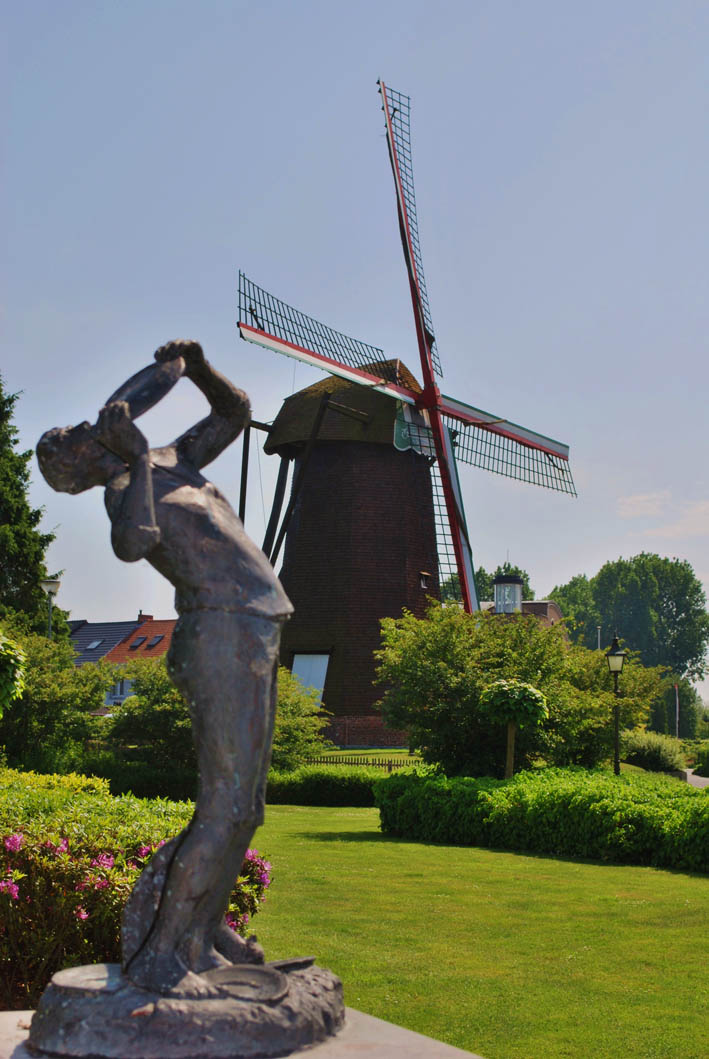
Telowerelè'er and Toremansmolen

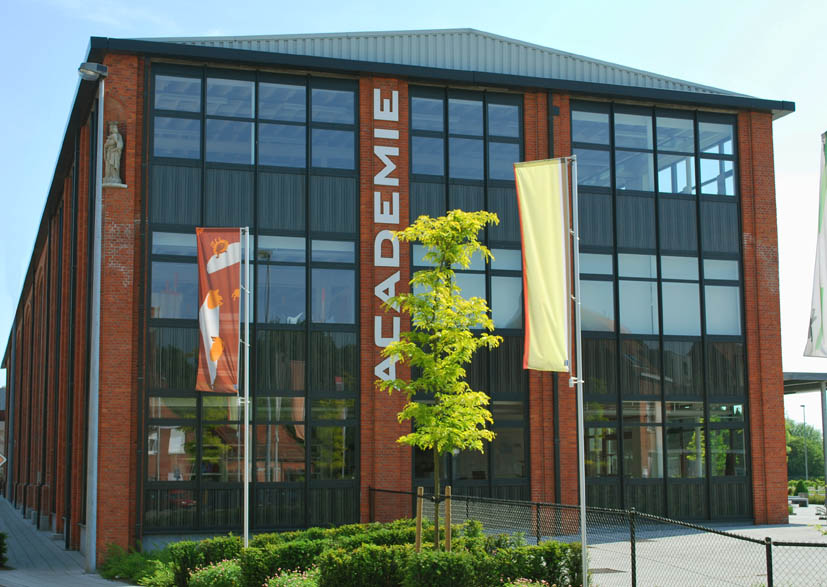
Arendonk's Academy of art located in a former cigar factory of "Karel I sigaren"

== Climate ==
Climate data for Arendonk (1991−2020 normals)
Month	Jan	Feb	Mar	Apr	May	Jun	Jul	Aug	Sep	Oct	Nov	Dec	Year
Mean daily maximum °C (°F)	6.3 (43.3)	7.3 (45.1)	11.1 (52.0)	15.5 (59.9)	19.1 (66.4)	21.8 (71.2)	23.8 (74.8)	23.5 (74.3)	19.9 (67.8)	15.1 (59.2)	10.1 (50.2)	6.7 (44.1)	15.0 (59.0)
Daily mean °C (°F)	3.5 (38.3)	3.9 (39.0)	6.7 (44.1)	10.0 (50.0)	13.8 (56.8)	16.6 (61.9)	18.6 (65.5)	18.2 (64.8)	14.9 (58.8)	11.1 (52.0)	6.9 (44.4)	4.1 (39.4)	10.7 (51.3)
Mean daily minimum °C (°F)	0.7 (33.3)	0.6 (33.1)	2.3 (36.1)	4.5 (40.1)	8.5 (47.3)	11.5 (52.7)	13.5 (56.3)	12.9 (55.2)	10.0 (50.0)	7.0 (44.6)	3.8 (38.8)	1.5 (34.7)	6.4 (43.5)
Average precipitation mm (inches)	72.2 (2.84)	66.6 (2.62)	57.1 (2.25)	43.4 (1.71)	60.1 (2.37)	74.0 (2.91)	82.2 (3.24)	80.2 (3.16)	66.5 (2.62)	69.2 (2.72)	76.1 (3.00)	92.0 (3.62)	839.7 (33.06)
Average precipitation days (≥ 1.0 mm)	12.7	11.6	10.7	8.7	9.9	10.2	11.2	11.1	10.2	10.9	12.6	14.1	133.7
Mean monthly sunshine hours	62	79	133	186	215	214	220	205	160	116	67	52	1,708
Source: Royal Meteorological Institute

== See also ==
- Ravago
