= Ravago =

Plastic production company

Ravago is a plastic producing company with its headquarters located in Luxembourg. The company is active in polymer and chemical distribution, building materials, recycling and compounding of plastic and elastomeric raw materials.

== History ==
On 25 April 1961, the company was founded by Raf Van Gorp and in 1965 he bought the premises of his former employer, a dynamite company (PRB: Poudre Reunion d'Arendonk, Belgique) in Arendonk.

== Operations ==
The Ravago group represents over 8,800,000 metric tons of annual polymer sales serving more than 57,000 active customers through 325+ locations across more than 60+ countries worldwide. Ravago’s production competence consists of 50+ manufacturing facilities of which 25 recycling and compounding plants in North America, Europe, Asia and Africa; 20 production plants in Europe that are offering finished product solutions for the building sector and 8 plants and 9 application laboratories for our Chemicals & Life Ingredients business. The operations are run by 10,000 employees.
