= Berlaar =

- Municipality
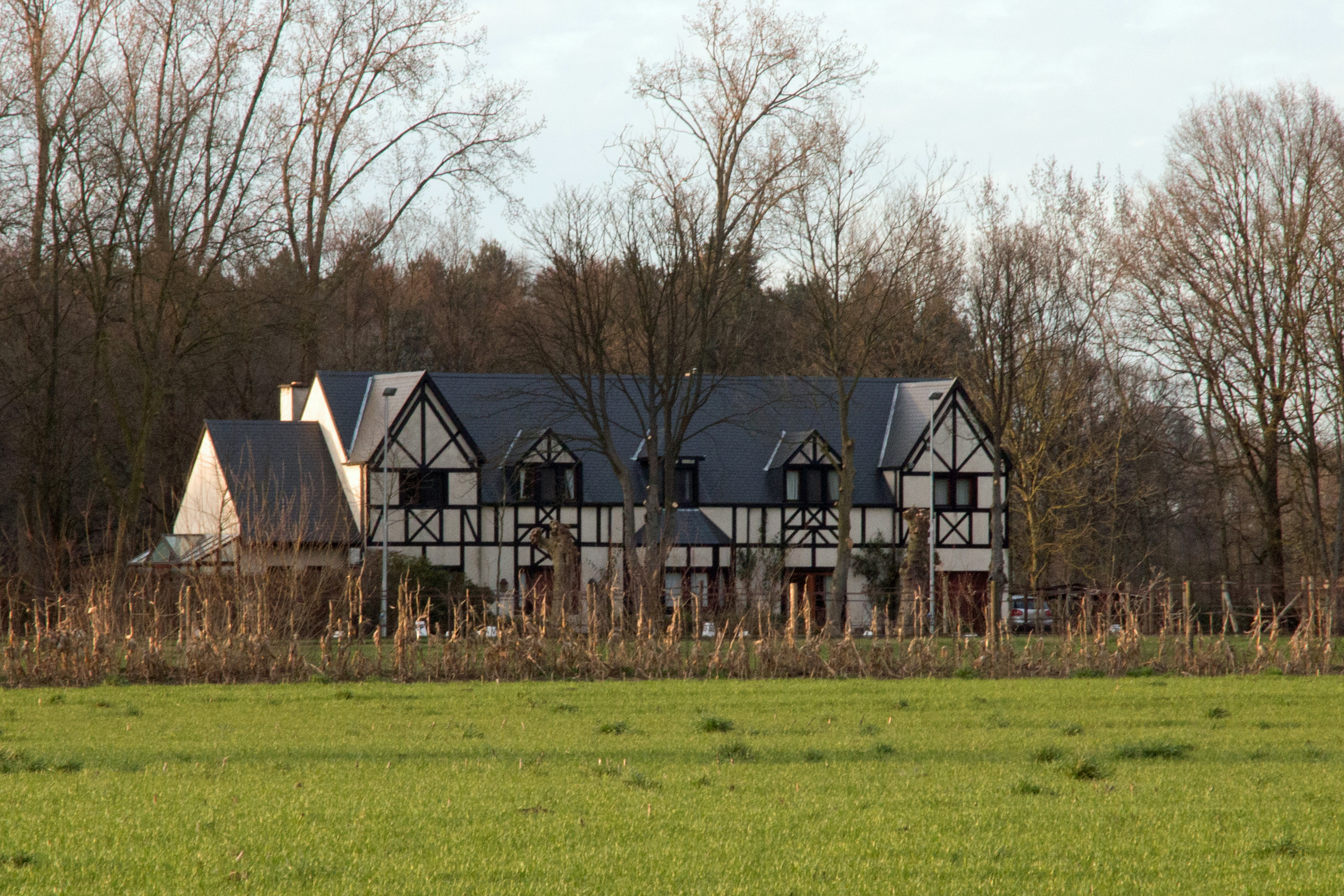
- Personnel houses of Gestelhof Castle

- Flag Coat of arms

- Location of Berlaar in the province of Antwerp
- Interactive map of Berlaar
- Location in Belgium
- Coordinates: 51°07′N 04°39′E
- Country: Belgium
- Community: Flemish Community
- Region: Flemish Region
- Province: Antwerp
- Arrondissement: Mechelen

Government
  - Mayor: Walter Horemans (CD&V)
  - Governing parties: CD&V, N-VA

Area
  - Total: 24.53 km^{2} (9.47 sq mi)

Population (2020-01-01)
  - Total: 11,656
  - Density: 475.2/km^{2} (1,231/sq mi)
- Postal codes: 2590
- NIS code: 12002
- Area codes: 03, 015
- Website: www.berlaar.be

Berlaar (Dutch pronunciation: [ˈbɛrlaːr]) is a municipality located in the Belgian province of Antwerp. The municipality comprises the towns of Berlaar proper and Gestel. In 2021, Berlaar had a total population of 11,710. The total area is 24.57 km^{2}.

== History ==
The current municipality of Berlaar was founded on 1 January 1965. Berlaar is actually a fusion of the former municipality Gestel and the Core of Berlaar itself. Berlaar is a part of the Belgische Kempen.

According to legend, the citizens of the early Middle Ages could not agree on where the church had to be built. They let fate decide and let two bears fight over it. Where the one bear killed the other, that would be the location the church should be built. Hence the exceptional position of the church at the end of the village square and not in the centre as usual.

One company of the recently-established 1st Fusilier Battalion was assigned to Berlaar in late 2026, as part of the recent expansion and strengthening of the Belgian Army.

== Climate ==
Climate data for Berlaar (1991−2020 normals)
Month	Jan	Feb	Mar	Apr	May	Jun	Jul	Aug	Sep	Oct	Nov	Dec	Year
Mean daily maximum °C (°F)	6.7 (44.1)	7.7 (45.9)	11.4 (52.5)	15.7 (60.3)	19.3 (66.7)	22.0 (71.6)	24.0 (75.2)	23.8 (74.8)	20.2 (68.4)	15.6 (60.1)	10.5 (50.9)	7.1 (44.8)	15.3 (59.5)
Daily mean °C (°F)	4.0 (39.2)	4.4 (39.9)	7.1 (44.8)	10.4 (50.7)	14.1 (57.4)	17.0 (62.6)	19.1 (66.4)	18.7 (65.7)	15.4 (59.7)	11.5 (52.7)	7.3 (45.1)	4.5 (40.1)	11.1 (52.0)
Mean daily minimum °C (°F)	1.2 (34.2)	1.0 (33.8)	2.8 (37.0)	5.1 (41.2)	9.0 (48.2)	12.1 (53.8)	14.2 (57.6)	13.5 (56.3)	10.6 (51.1)	7.4 (45.3)	4.2 (39.6)	1.9 (35.4)	6.9 (44.4)
Average precipitation mm (inches)	72.0 (2.83)	63.9 (2.52)	56.8 (2.24)	43.6 (1.72)	56.5 (2.22)	73.5 (2.89)	78.0 (3.07)	83.5 (3.29)	70.8 (2.79)	66.0 (2.60)	77.3 (3.04)	89.3 (3.52)	831.2 (32.72)
Average precipitation days (≥ 1.0 mm)	12.5	11.5	10.8	8.7	9.5	9.9	10.5	10.5	9.6	10.9	12.6	13.9	131.0
Mean monthly sunshine hours	61	76	134	187	217	217	223	209	162	117	67	51	1,718
Source: Royal Meteorological Institute

== Gallery ==
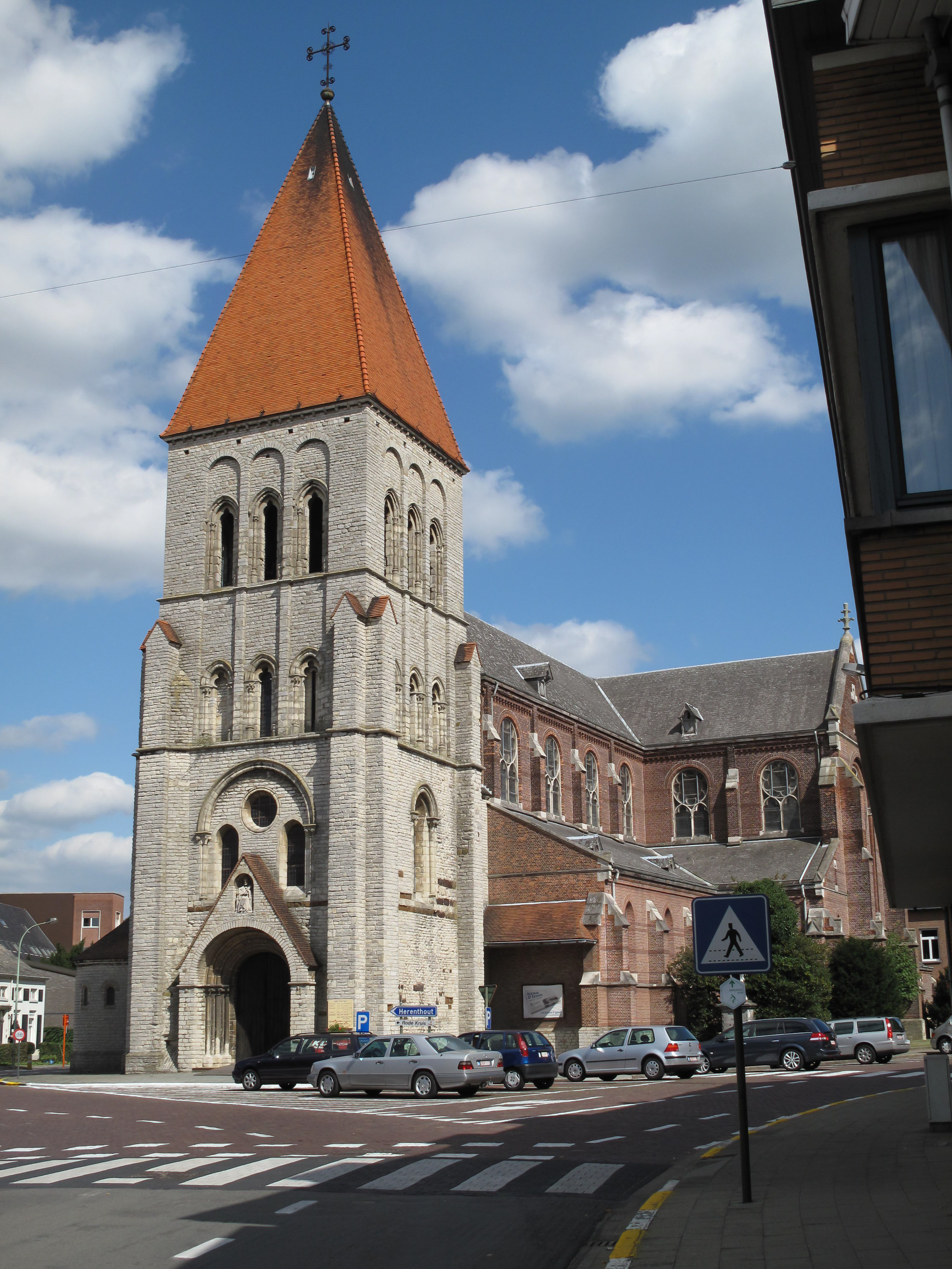
Berlaar church

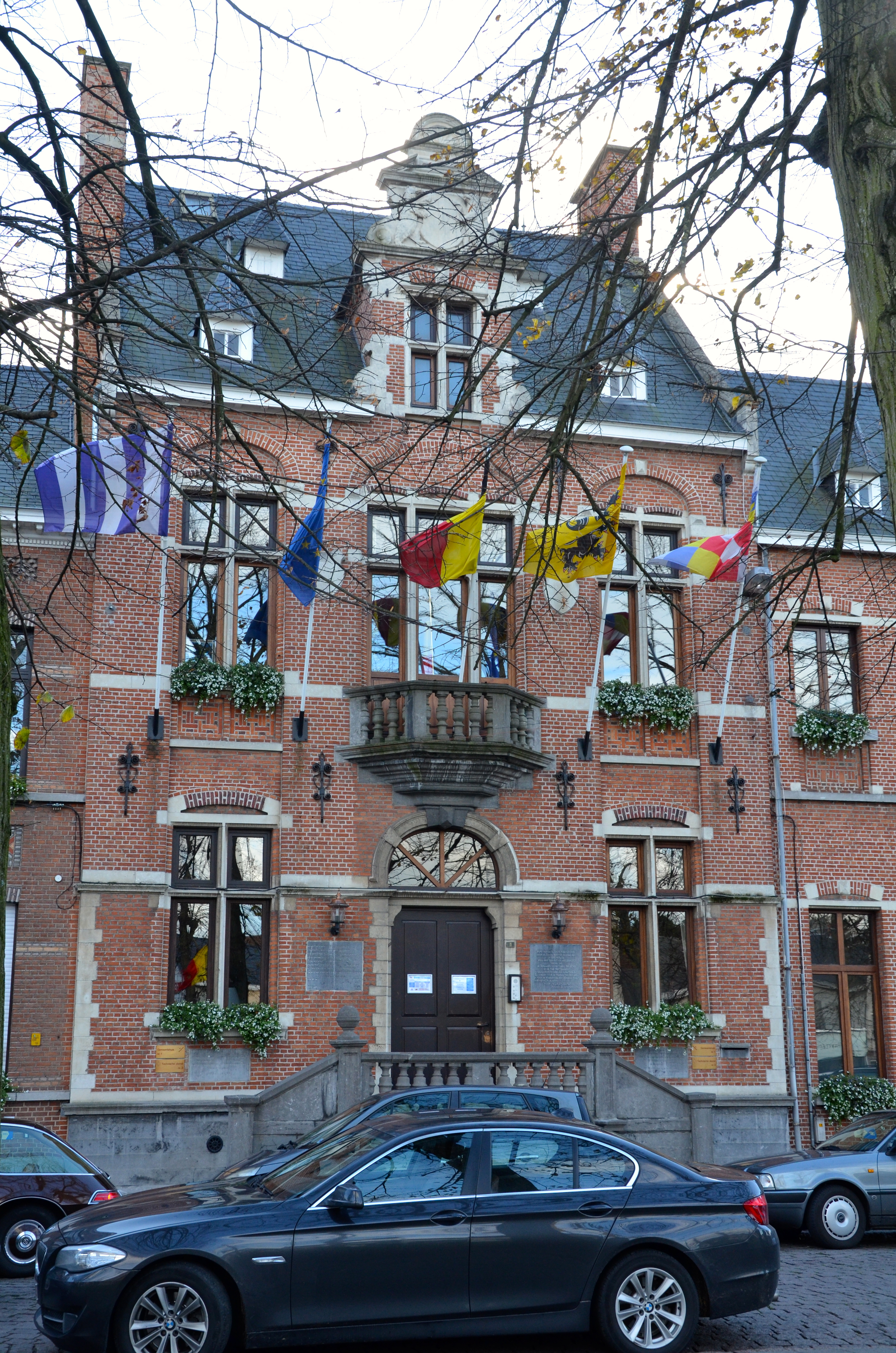
Town hall

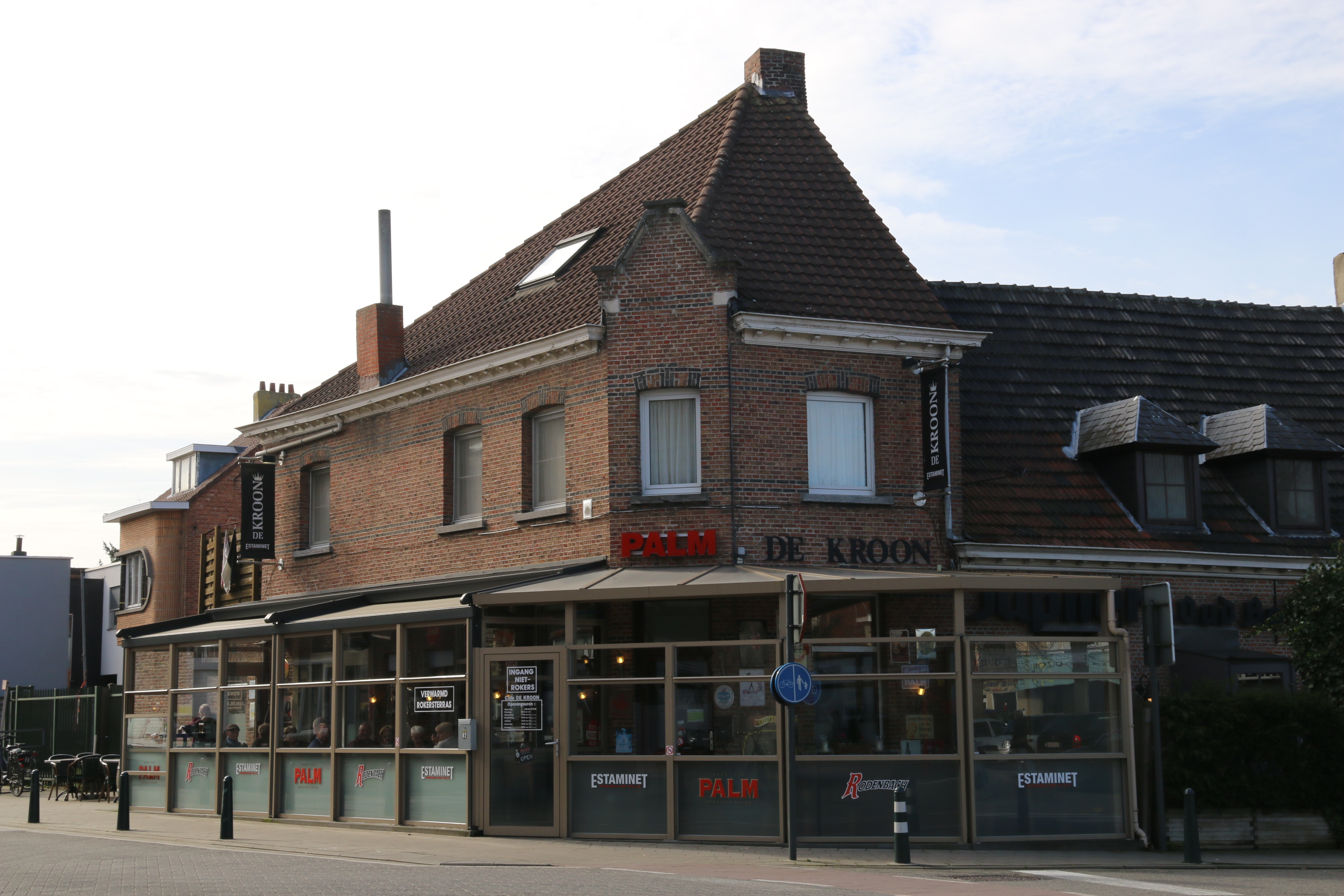
Pub in Berlaar

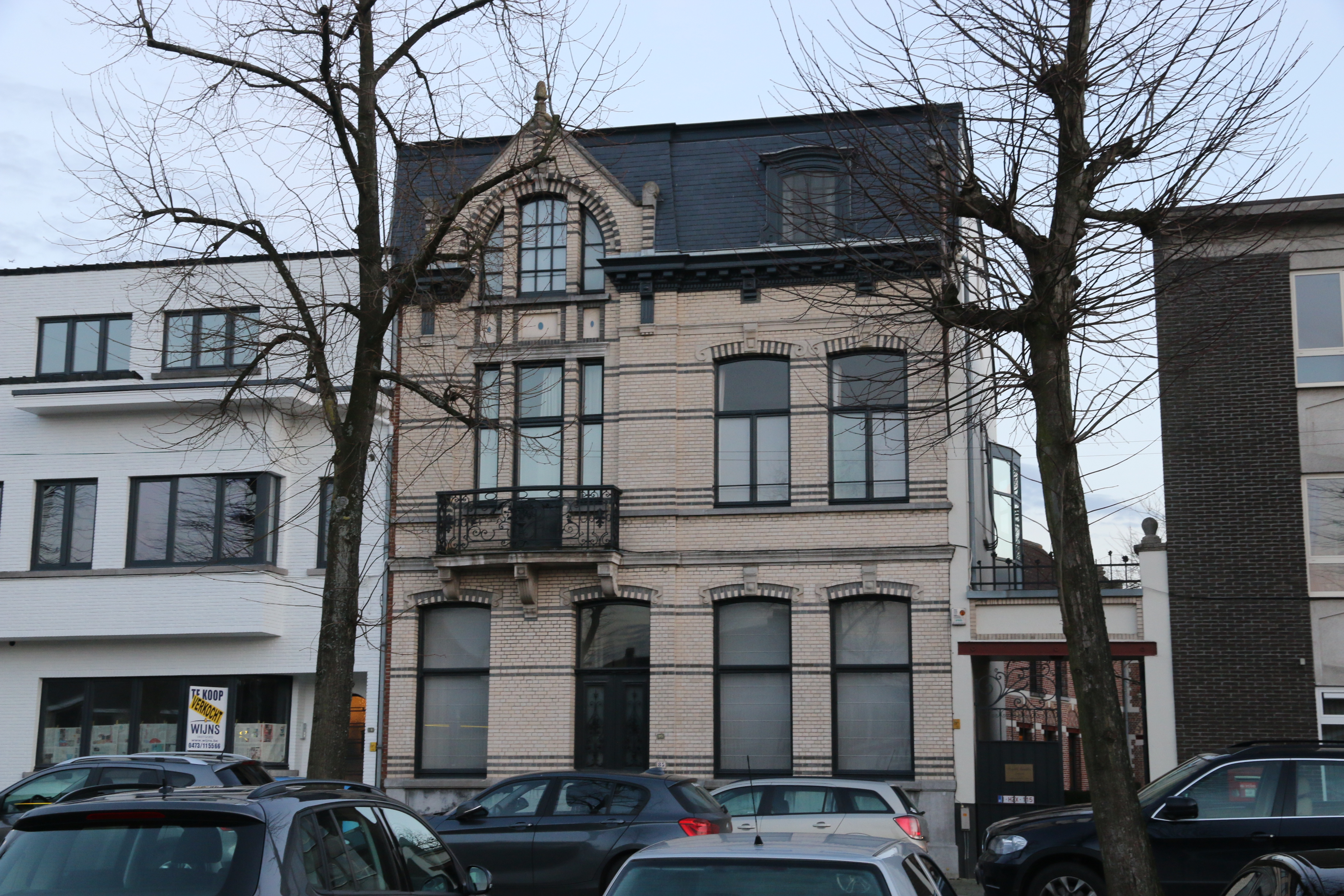
House on the market
