= Antwerp International School =

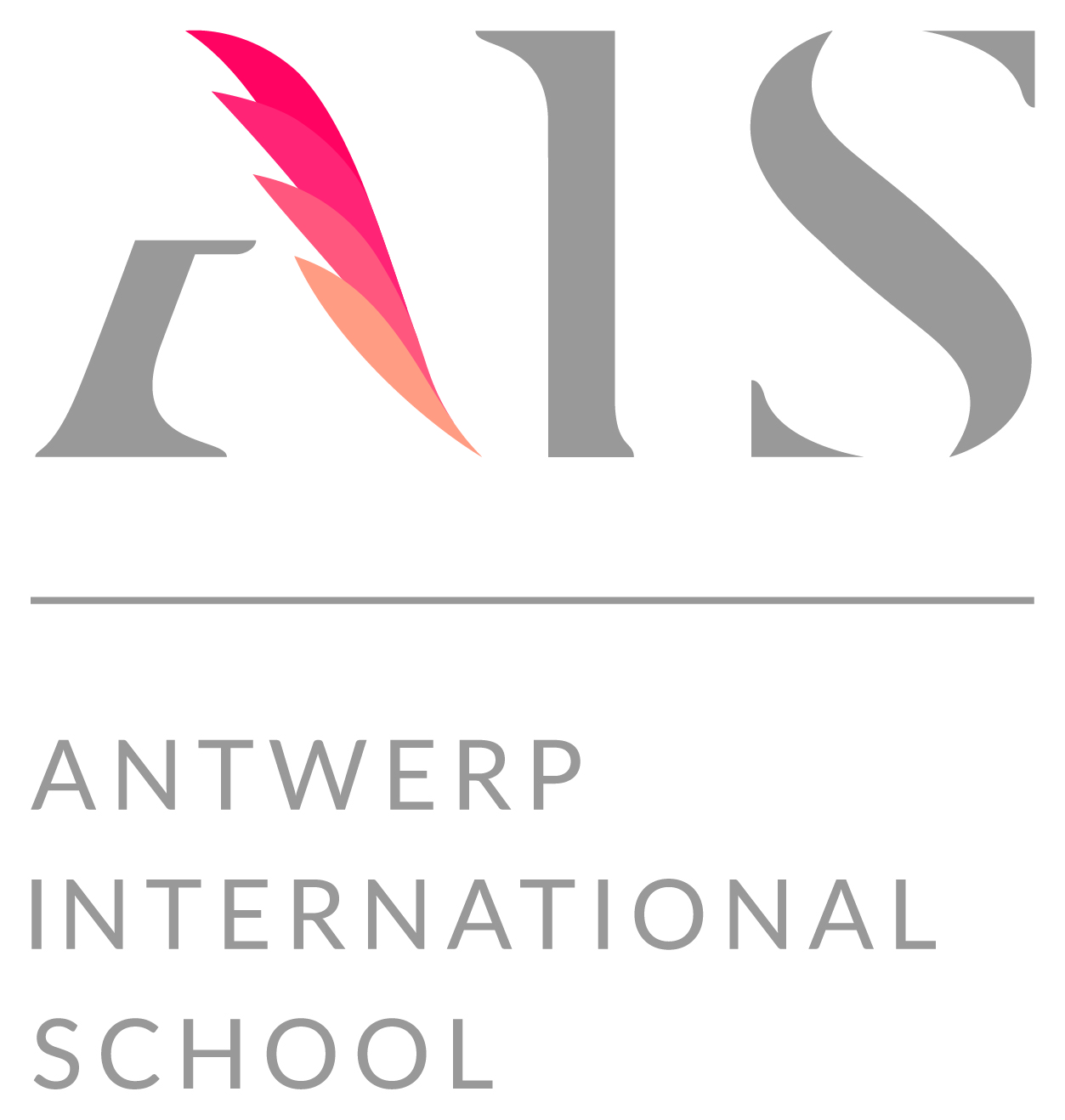

Location
- Veltwijcklaan 180, 2180 Ekeren-Antwerp, Belgium; Antwerp; Belgium
- Coordinates: 51.280152°N 4.430307°E

Information
- Type: Private/Co-Educational
- Motto: Inspiring Successful Futures
- Established: 1967
- Head of school: Andreas Koini
- Enrollment: Approx. 400
- Color(s): White, Grey, Burgundy (Red)
- Mascot: Griffin
- Website: https://www.ais-antwerp.be

Antwerp International School (AIS) is a private, international, co-educational preschool, prekindergarten, kindergarten, primary, and secondary school located in Antwerp, Belgium. Founded in 1967, the school hosts approximately 400 students and 90 staff members from at least 35 countries. AIS offers the entire continuum of the International Baccalaureate, which includes the Primary Years Programme (PYP), the Middle Years Programme (MYP) and the Diploma Programme (DP). The first senior class of AIS graduated in 1971, and the school celebrated its 50th anniversary in 2017.

== Accreditation ==
AIS is fully accredited by the Council of International Schools (CIS) and the New England Association of Schools and Colleges (NEASC). The school offers the International Baccalaureate Diploma Programme since 1976. AIS received authorisation to offer the Primary Years Programme and the Middle Years Programme in 2017.

AIS was the first international school to gain accreditation by the European Council of International Schools (ECIS). In July 2003, the accreditation authority became the Council of International Schools [CIS]. In 2012, it was the first school to receive five consecutive re-accreditations by ECIS/CIS.

== Facilities ==
By the end of the 1990–91 school year, AIS added a kitchen and cafeteria, a library, two computer labs, eleven secondary school classrooms and twenty elementary school classrooms. Three science laboratories were renovated. Since September 1991, students at AIS have had access to specialised facilities for art, music and theatre. A Middle School building and High School addition were completed in the spring of 2001, and a new gymnasium and health centre in March 2003.

As of 2021, AIS has completed construction of its new STEM facilities, which encompasses the renovation of what used to be called the "Old Gym" - the former gymnasium. This new stem facility houses specialized facilities for Design, Science and Mathematics; a new presentation area and a new administrative section.

== Sports ==
AIS is a member of the Northwest European Council of International Schools (NECIS), playing competitively against other schools in Northwestern Europe: Denmark, Germany, Luxembourg, the Netherlands, Norway and Sweden.

The AIS sports teams are named after the Griffin, a mythical creature with the body of a lion (symbolising the Flemish community) and the head and wings of an American eagle (a nod to the school's roots as the American School of Antwerp).

== Arts ==
The campus hosts a Fine Arts Centre with two art studios, multiple music rooms and a 350-seat theatre.
