= Lycée Français International d'Anvers =

French international school in Antwerp, Belgium

Coordinates: 51.20308°N 4.42014°E

Lycée Français International Anvers, formerly Collège Marie-José, is a French international school in Antwerp, Belgium. In central Antwerp the Lycée Français International offers a curriculum in French, English and Dutch. Run in conjunction with the Agency for French Education Abroad (AEFE), the Lycée Français International is part of a network of 500 schools in 130 countries.

== A trilingual education ==
Since 2021, the LFIA is part of the Odyssey network. It offers a trilingual programme, all lessons in primary school (kindergarten and elementary) are given in French (13h), English (10h) and Dutch (3h). This teaching allows for immersion in French and English, as well as an introduction to Dutch.

Non-French or non-English speaking pupils are supported during their initial contact with their new language thanks to a system called Passerelle, which empowers them through intensive sessions given in very small groups to acquire the tools necessary for immersion learning.

As of 2021 the school has 110 students from around twenty different nationalities. Some students live in Brussels and commute to this school. Moreover LFIA is only 40 kilometres away from Brussels and easily reachable by train or public transport, making it possible to welcome children from all around the country.

French International School of Antwerp - Lycée Français International d'Anvers
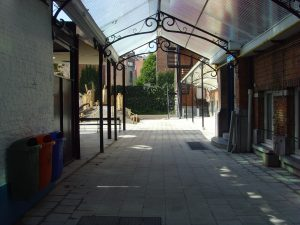
- Antwerp, Belgium

Information
- Established: 1901
- Head of school: Fabrice Humann

== History ==
Lycée Français International, founded in 1901, was first a Belgian establishment for French-speaking education known as Institut Rochez then it became Lycée d’Anvers. In 1919 a girl-school opened its doors in the actual buildings of the Lycée Français International under the name of Collège Marie-José.

After the reforms of Belgian education in the 1970s, it became the Lycée Français International in 2001.

Since then, the school is part of the AEFE network (Agency for French Education Abroad) and guarantees that French programs and values are respected in every Lycée Français abroad thanks to a service of inspections and regional coordination.
