= Ravels =

- Municipality
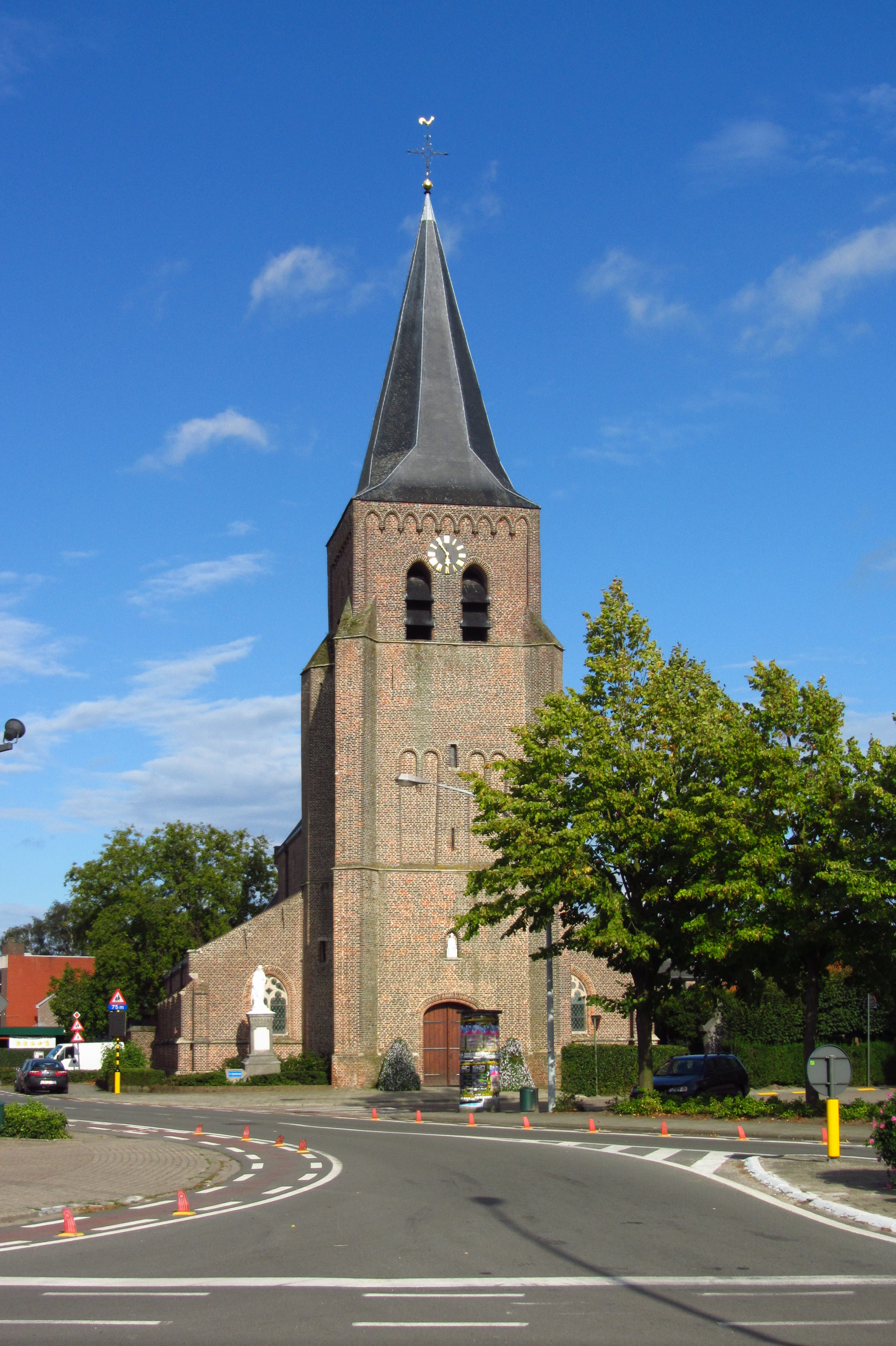

- Flag Coat of arms

- Location of Ravels in the province of Antwerp
- Interactive map of Ravels
- Location in Belgium
- Coordinates: 51°22′N 05°00′E
- Country: Belgium
- Community: Flemish Community
- Region: Flemish Region
- Province: Antwerp
- Arrondissement: Turnhout

Government
  - Mayor: Walter Luyten (CD&V)
  - Governing party: CD&V

Area
  - Total: 95.13 km^{2} (36.73 sq mi)

Population (2018-01-01)
  - Total: 14,871
  - Density: 156.3/km^{2} (404.9/sq mi)
- Postal codes: 2380-2382
- NIS code: 13035
- Area codes: 014
- Website: www.ravels.be

Ravels (Dutch pronunciation: [ˈraːvəls]) is a municipality located in the Belgian province of Antwerp. The municipality comprises the towns of Poppel, Ravels proper and Weelde. In 2021, Ravels had a total population of 15,105. The total area is 94.99 km^{2}. A large proportion of its inhabitants are immigrants from The Netherlands. The local economy is mainly agrarian. Ravels is a center of livestock farming in Belgium (especially cows, pigs, poultry), since the local climate is ideal for the animals.

The town hall and the municipal services are located in Weelde.
