= Duesenberg (disambiguation) =

Duesenberg was an automobile manufacturer active from 1913 to 1937. Duesenberg may also refer to:

- August Duesenberg, German-American automobile manufacturer
- Fred Duesenberg, German-American automobile manufacturer
- Duesenberg Guitars, a German company producing electric guitars and basses

== See also ==
- Duisenberg
- Duesberg (disambiguation)
