= Eugène Anspach =

Belgian lawyer and civil servant

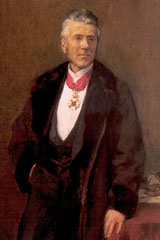
Portrait of Anspach by the artist Herman Richir.

Eugène Guillaume Anspach (7 February 1833 – 21 December 1890) was a Belgian lawyer, civil servant, and former governor of the National Bank of Belgium (NBB) from 1888 until 1890. Born in Brussels, he was a convinced protestant.

== Career ==
He was appointed as censor of the NBB in 1864 and as a member of the discount committee of the bank in 1868. In 1870 he was made a director and in 1882 he became vice-governor. He was appointed governor of the bank in 1888.

As governor of the National Bank of Belgium he took an interest in the efficient organisation of the discount offices and the branches of the NBB. The gradual disintegration of the Latin Monetary Union made him, together with Eudore Pirmez and Walthère Frère-Orban, try to restore monetary order.

Anspach died in Brussels on 21 December 1890.

Preceded by Alexandre Jamar	Governor of the National Bank of Belgium; 1888–1890	Succeeded by Victor Van Hoegaerden
