= Cecil de Strycker =

Belgian economist and civil servant

Baron Cecil de Strycker (1915–2004) was a Belgian economist, civil servant, and former governor of the National Bank of Belgium (NBB) from 1975 until 1982. Under his management, the NBB established the Central Balance Sheet Office and the Central Office of Consumer Credit and a new wing was added to the Brussels headquarters of the Bank.

He obtained a PhD in commercial sciences with a thesis on the National Bank. He joined the NBB in 1945 as an executive in the Foreign Affairs department, and in 1958 he was appointed as a director at the bank. In 1968 he became a member of the European Economic Community's Monetary Committee. In 1971 he succeeded Franz de Voghel as vice-governor of the Bank, and he was appointed governor in 1975. During his tenure as governor of the NBB, the management of the Bank remained resolute in the face of ever-increasing calls for a devaluation of the belgian franc to resolve the crisis which hit Belgium in the 1970s. As an alternative, Cecil de Strycker emphasised the need for an effective recovery policy and wage moderation.

He played an important role on the Committee of Governors of the Central Banks of the Member States of the European Economic Community and in the European Monetary Cooperation Fund, and in 1978 he became the president of both these institutions. In 1979, the European Monetary System was launched, which based on the ECU.

On 19 February 1982 the Belgian government of Martens V, informed him that a devaluation of the Belgian franc was imminent. The National Bank had not been directly involved in the preparations for the devaluation, which had been prepared by Alfons Verplaetse and Jacques van Ypersele de Strihou. Cecil de Strycker retired in March 1982

== Sources ==
- SE MURIÓ EL BARÓN DE STRYCKER (in Spanish)
- Cecil de Strycker

| Preceded by Robert Vandeputte | Governor of the National Bank of Belgium; 1975–1982 | Succeeded by Jean Godeaux |
