= Luc Coene =

Belgian economist

Luc Coene (11 March 1947 – 5 January 2017) was a Belgian economist. He was Governor of the National Bank of Belgium (NBB) from April 2011 until March 2015.

== Education ==
Luc Coene was born in Ghent and graduated in economics at Ghent University in 1970 (Ghent, Belgium) and obtained a postgraduate diploma in European economic integration at the College of Europe in 1971 (Bruges).

== Career ==
He started his career at the NBB in July 1973, where he worked at the Research Department (Information division) until May 1976. From May 1976 until November 1979, he worked at the Foreign Department (International Agreements division) of the NBB. From November 1979 until February 1985, worked as Assistant to the Belgian Executive Director at the International Monetary Fund (IMF). He worked as Deputy chef de cabinet to the Minister of Finance from February 1985 until November 1985, and Chef de cabinet to the Vice-Premier and Minister for the Budget from November 1985 until May 1988.

He was a visiting scholar at the IMF from June 1988 until November 1988 and an Economic adviser at the ECFIN Directorate of the European Commission from January 1989 until January 1992. From February 1992 until October 1995, he worked for the NBB at the Foreign Department as Adviser to the head of department.

From November 1995 until July 1999, he was a Senator for the VLD in the Belgian Senate and subsequently Chef de cabinet to the Prime Minister and Secretary to the Council of Ministers from July 1999 until September 2001. From September 2001 until August 2003, he was Chairman of the Board of Directors of the Chancellery of, Prime Minister Guy Verhofstadt and Secretary to the Council of Ministers.

From August 2003, he became a Director and Deputy Governor of the NBB for a 6-year term. On 1 April 2011 he was appointed Governor until 11 March 2015. He was succeeded by Jan Smets.

He was a member of the Advisory Board of the Itinera Institute think-tank.

In March 2015, he became a member of the ECB Supervisory Board, the operational decision-making body of European Banking Supervision.

== See also ==
- Crown Council of Belgium

| Preceded by Guy Quaden | Governor of the National Bank of Belgium; 2011-2015 | Succeeded by Jan Smets |
