= Victor Van Hoegaerden =

Belgian businessman

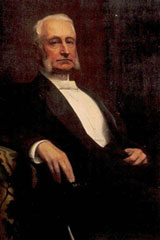
Victor Van Hoegaerden

Victor Van Hoegaerden (1828–1905) was a Belgian businessman and governor of the National Bank of Belgium (NBB) from 1891 until 1905.

== Career ==
He started his career as a businessman establishing weaving mills in Ohain, Lokeren, Tubize, Zele and Ghent. The mills of Tubize, Zele and Ghent would, years later, grow into the Usines Cotonnières de Belgique. From the establishment of the Caisse générale d'épargne et de retraite in 1865, he became a member of its management board and became its president in 1889.

In 1869 he was appointed to the discount committee of the NBB, and a year later he became a director. He succeeded Eugène Anspach as vice-governor of the NBB in 1888 and as governor in 1891. His term as governor of the NBB coincided with an economic revival after the economic depression which had lasted from 1873 until 1895.

Under his leadership the Public Depository as a new department was established at the bank. From now on people could deposit all sorts of valuables or securities, and the bank would take charge of the deposits. On 26 March 1900 the law came into force which for the second time extended the term of the Bank by thirty years.

== Sources ==
- Victor Van Hoegaerden

Preceded by Eugène Anspach	Governor of the National Bank of Belgium; 1891–1905	Succeeded by Théophile de Lantsheere
