= Duesberg =

Duesberg may refer to:

- Peter Duesberg (1936–2026), German-American molecular biologist, academic, and AIDS denialist
  - Duesberg hypothesis, disproven claim that HIV does not cause AIDS
- Museum François Duesberg, a museum of decorative arts in Belgium
- Helen Tobias-Duesberg (1919–2010), Estonian–American composer
