= Théophile de Lantsheere =

Belgian politician

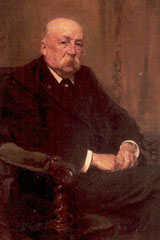
- 1907 portrait of de Lantsheere

President of the Chamber of Representatives
- In office 12 November 1884 – 30 January 1896
- Preceded by: Xavier Victor Thibaut
- Succeeded by: Auguste Marie François Beernaert

Personal details
- Born: 4 November 1833 Asse, Belgium
- Died: 21 February 1918 (aged 84) Brussels, Belgium
- Party: Catholic Party

Théophile Charles André de Lantsheere (4 November 1833 – 21 February 1918) was a Belgian Catholic Party politician.

Born in Asse, de Lantsheere was a student of law, obtaining a doctorate, and practiced as an advocate in Brussels. He was elected to the Belgian Chamber of Representatives in 1872 for the Diksmuide area, serving until 1900.

He served as Minister of Justice from 1871 to 1878. From 1884 to 1895 he was President of the Chamber of Representatives. After leaving the Chamber of Representatives he served a term from 1900 to 1905 in the Belgian Senate representing West Flanders.

From 1890, he held the post of director of the National Bank of Belgium and from 1905 until his death in 1918 he was governor of the National Bank of Belgium (NBB). Together with Baron Alphonse de Moreau d’Andoy and Victor Allard, Théophile de Lantsheere formed the first group of Catholics on the board of the NBB. Before the outbreak of World War I he arranged the transfer of the bullion and cash reserves of the NBB as well as the banknotes and printing material to the Bank of England.

He died in Brussels, a few months before the end of the war. His son Léon de Lantsheere was later also Minister of Justice.

== Honours ==
- Knight grand Cross in the Order of the Oak Crown.

== Sources ==
- Théophile de Lantsheere

Political offices
Preceded by Xavier Victor Thibaut	President of the Chamber of Representatives; 1884–1896	Succeeded by Auguste Marie François Beernaert
Government offices
Preceded by Victor Van Hoegaerden	Governor of the National Bank of Belgium; 1905–1918	Succeeded by Leon Van der Rest
