= Leon Van der Rest =

Belgian lawyer and businessman (1846–1932)

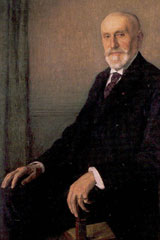
- Leon Van der Rest
- Born: 1846
- Died: 1932 (aged 85–86)
- Occupations: Lawyer businessman governor

Léon Van der Rest (1846–1932) was a Belgian lawyer, businessman and governor of the National Bank of Belgium (NBB) from 1918 until 1923.

== Career ==
He started his career as a lawyer at the Brussels Bar, but after a few years took charge of the family business as an ironmonger. Besides being active in the family business, he also served as commissioner for a number of other companies. In 1888 he became a member of the discount committee of the NBB, while being an administrator of the Crédit Anversois. In 1898 he was appointed as a censor of the bank and in 1905 as a director. In 1912, he became vice-governor under Théophile de Lantsheere. When Théophile de Lantsheere was removed as governor of the bank by the Germans on 22 December 1914 at the start of the occupation of Belgium during World War I, he became in charge of the NBB.

During the war Léon Van der Rest, was vice-president of the National Aid and Food Provision Committee, under Emile Francqui. After the war, he became governor of the NBB in 1918. The immediate postwar period knew a rampant inflation and loss of value of the belgian franc. In 1923, he did not seek the renewal of this term as governor and became the first honorary governor of the NBB. He was succeeded by Fernand Hautain.

== Sources ==
- Léon Van der Rest

Preceded by Théophile de Lantsheere	Governor of the National Bank of Belgium; 1918–1923	Succeeded by Fernand Hautain
