= Museum of the National Bank of Belgium =

Central bank museum in Brussels, Belgium

- Museum van de Nationale Bank van België (Dutch); Musée de la Banque nationale de Belgique (French); Museum der Belgischen Nationalbank (German)
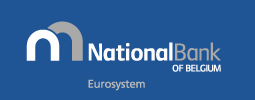

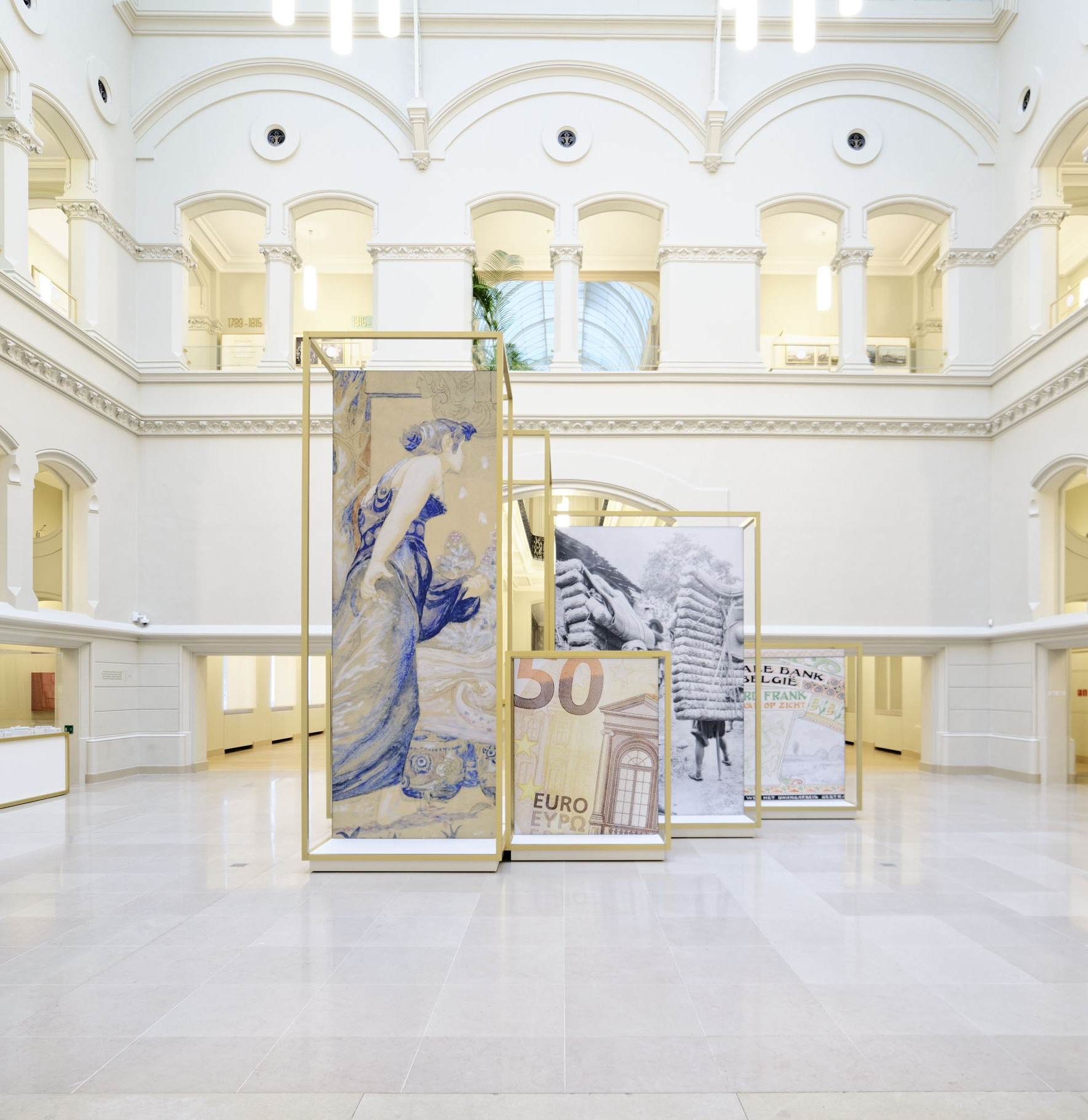
- Atrium of the UCB building, housing the Museum of the National Bank of Belgium
- Interactive fullscreen map
- Established: 1982; 44 years ago
- Location: Rue Montagne aux Herbes Potagères / Warmoesberg 57, 1000 City of Brussels, Brussels-Capital Region, Belgium
- Coordinates: 50°50′59″N 4°21′26″E
- Type: History museum
- Website: museum.nbb.be/en

The Museum of the National Bank of Belgium (Dutch: Museum van de Nationale Bank van België; French: Musée de la Banque nationale de Belgique; German: Museum der Belgischen Nationalbank) is a museum in central Brussels, Belgium, belonging to the National Bank of Belgium (NBB). Opened in 1982, it is one of the oldest central bank museums in Europe.

== Building ==
The museum's current building was constructed between 1872 and 1874 to serve as a bank for the Union du Crédit de Bruxelles bank. It was designed by the local architect Désiré De Keyser. In 1969, Union du Crédit de Bruxelles was acquired by the United California Bank. In 1979, the National Bank of Belgium purchased the building and several others nearby. The building was restored between 2004 and 2009. Before its restoration, the building had been severely damaged by dry rot and alterations. The museum has occupied the building since 2018.

== Collection ==
The museum is divided into three exhibits: the history of money, the history of the National Bank of Belgium, and the interactions between people and money and the design of money. It has a collection of old Belgian coins and explains the emergence of currency through the centuries.

== Gallery ==
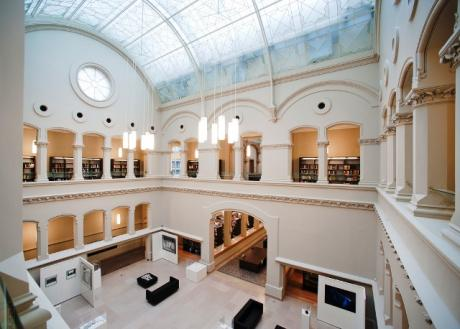
Atrium

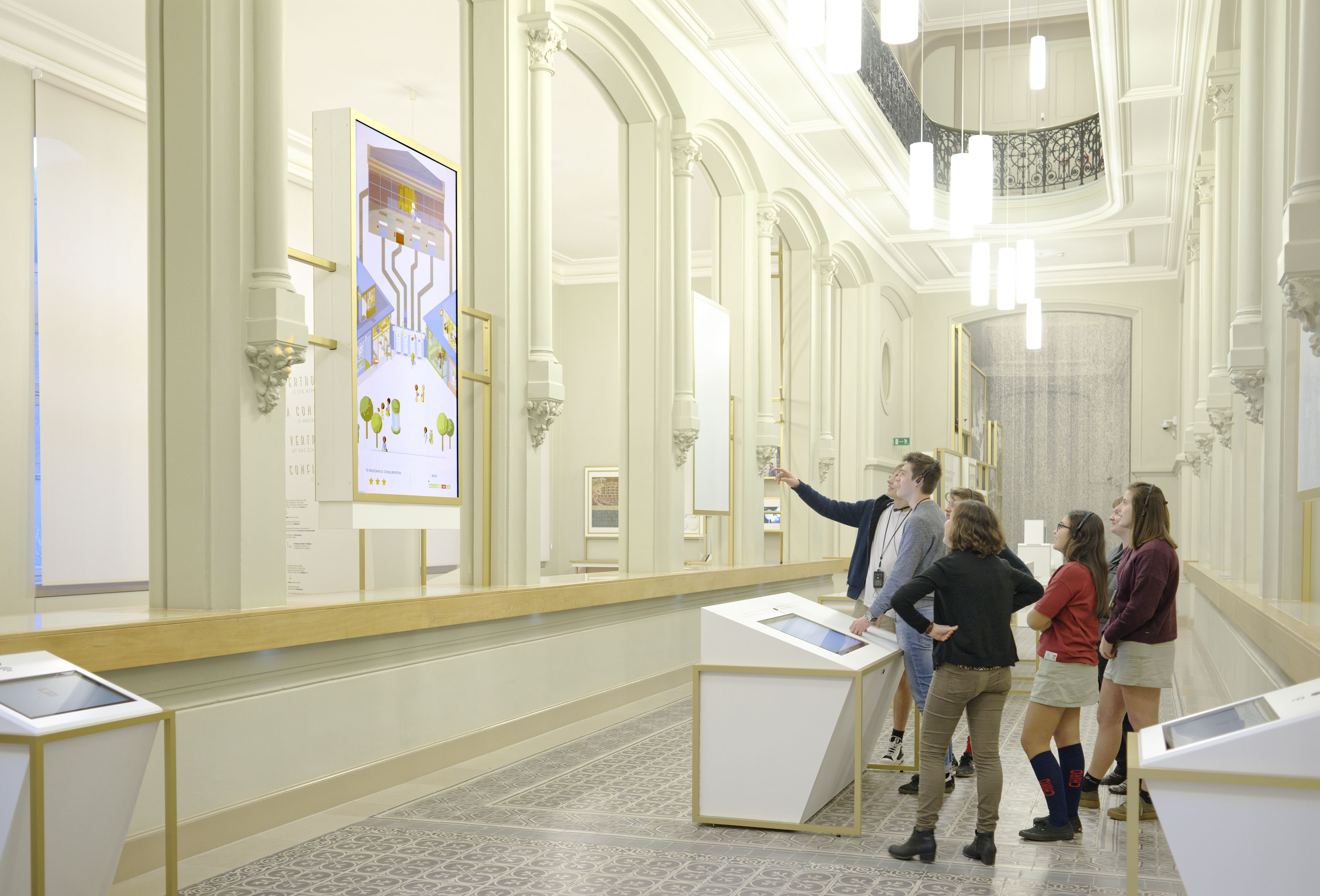
Former counter hall

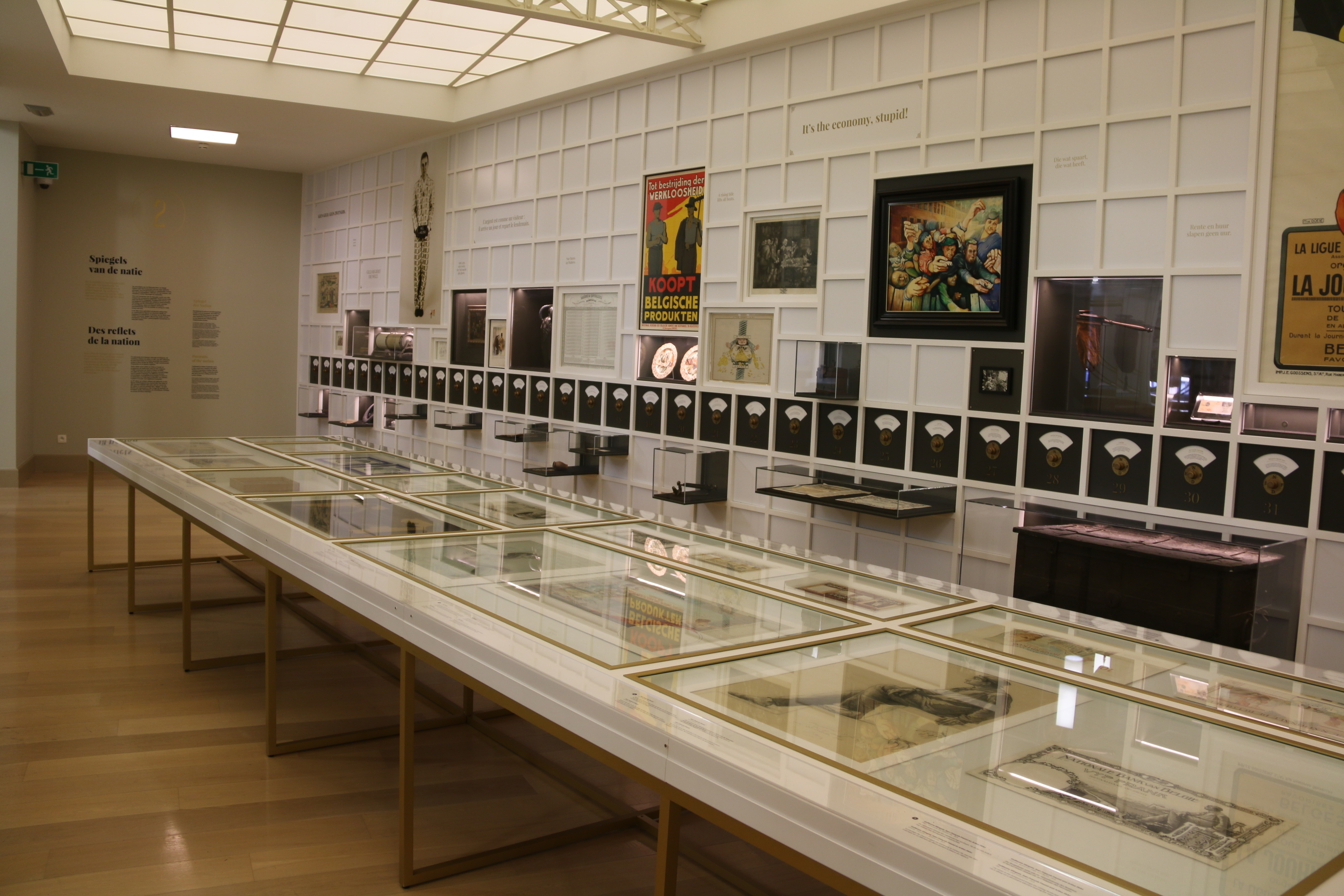
Exhibition space

== See also ==
- List of museums in Brussels
- History of Brussels
- Belgium in the long nineteenth century
