= Georges Theunis =

Belgian politician

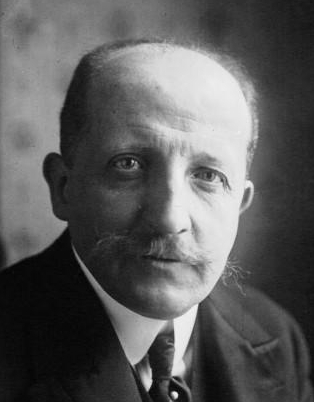
- Theunis in 1921

Prime Minister of Belgium
- In office 20 November 1934 – 25 March 1935
- Monarch: Leopold III
- Preceded by: Charles de Broqueville
- Succeeded by: Paul van Zeeland
- In office 16 December 1921 – 13 May 1925
- Monarch: Albert I
- Preceded by: Henri Carton de Wiart
- Succeeded by: Aloys Van de Vyvere

Governor of the National Bank of Belgium
- In office 1941–1944
- Preceded by: Albert Goffin
- Succeeded by: Maurice Frère

Personal details
- Born: 28 February 1873 Montegnée, Belgium
- Died: 4 January 1966 (aged 92) Brussels, Belgium
- Party: Catholic Party

Georges (George) Emile Léonard Theunis (28 February 1873 – 4 January 1966) was the prime minister of Belgium from 1921 to 1925 and again from 1934 to 1935. He was governor of the National Bank of Belgium (NBB) in exile in London, from 1941 until 1944. He was also the minister of Finance from 1920 to 1925.

== Life ==
Theunis received military training and was also trained as an engineer. Georges Theunis started his career in the Empain group, where he was an administrator and later the president of the board of ACEC. During World War I, he headed the Belgian Wartime Provisions Commission in London. After the war he was involved in the Paris Peace Conference, in 1919 and served as the Belgian delegate to the Reparations Commission. In May 1927 he chaired the World Economic Conference in Geneva.

In 1926 Theunis joined the newly formed council of Regency of the National Bank, together with Emile Francqui, and remained a member until the war, except for two breaks during his ministerial duties. As regents of the NBB, both Theunis and Francqui represented the power which the large private banks had gained since 1926. During World War II he served as a special ambassador to the United States of America. In 1941, he was appointed governor of the National Bank of Belgium by the Pierlot government in exile at London instead of Albert Goffin who had been appointed by Secretary General Charles Plisnier. On his return to Belgium after the war, he resigned as governor of the NBB.

== Honours ==
- Belgium: Minister of State, by Royal Decree.
- Belgium: Grand Cordon in the Order of Leopold
- Czechoslovakia: Grand Cross of the Order of the White Lion
- France: knight Grand Cross Legion of Honour
- United Kingdom: Order of Saint Michael and Saint George
- Grand Cross in the Order of Saint Gregory the Great, 1932.

== Sources ==
- Georges Theunis on the site of the Belgian Federal Government
- Georges Theunis
- A tribute to America, the U.S.A. at war as seen through Belgian eyes A speech by Theunis

Political offices
Preceded by Henri Carton de Wiart	Prime Minister of Belgium; 1921–1925	Succeeded by Aloys Van de Vyvere
Preceded by Charles de Broqueville	Prime Minister of Belgium; 1934–1935	Succeeded by Paul van Zeeland
Government offices
Preceded by Albert Goffin	Governor of the National Bank of Belgium; 1941–1944	Succeeded by Maurice Frère
