= François-Philippe de Haussy =

Belgian businessman, liberal politician and civil servant

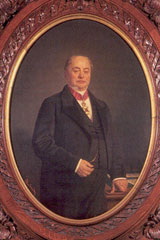
- Born: François Philippe Louis Hyacinthe Joseph de Haussy; 3 July 1789; Mons, Prince-Bishopric of Liège
- Died: 19 October 1869 (aged 80); Brussels, Belgium
- Occupations: politician, businessman, civil servant

François Philippe Louis Hyacinthe Joseph de Haussy (French pronunciation: [fʁɑ̃swa filip lwi jasɛ̃t ʒozɛf də osi]; 3 July 1789 – 19 October 1869) was a Belgian businessman, liberal politician and civil servant. He was Belgian minister of justice from 1847 until 1850.

He was appointed as the first governor of the newly founded National Bank of Belgium by king Leopold I of Belgium and Walthère Frère-Orban in 1850. He remained in office until 1869.

He was born in Mons and died in Brussels aged 80.

== Sources ==
- François-Philippe de Haussy

Preceded by none	Governor of the National Bank of Belgium; 1850–1869	Succeeded by Eugène Prévinaire
