= Jean Godeaux =

Belgian economist and civil servant

Baron Jean Godeaux (3 July 1922 – 27 April 2009) was a Belgian economist, civil servant and former governor of the National Bank of Belgium (NBB) from 1982 until 1989.

Jean Godeaux studied both law and economics, and started his career in 1947 at the NBB in the Foreign Affairs department. From 1949 until 1955, he was a member of the Belgian delegation to the International Monetary Fund. When he returned to Brussels in 1955, he was appointed as a director of the Banque Lambert, where he subsequently became co-administrator, and later chairman of the board of the bank. He was involved in the preparations for the merger with the Banque de Bruxelles, which would lead to the creation of the Banque Bruxelles Lambert. Godeaux resigned in 1974, before the finalisation of the merger, in order to become the president of the Banking Commission of Belgium, and in 1979 he joined the European Commission's Banking Advisory Committee.

When he was appointed as governor of the NBB in 1982, he was immediately faced with the devaluation of the Belgian franc. Due to this devaluation the relations with Luxembourg had been seriously disrupted and he had the task to normalize the relations.

In 1988, Godeaux became president of the Committee of Governors of the Central Banks of the Member States of the EEC, and of the European Monetary Cooperation Fund. In 1989 he contributed to the preparation of the Delors Report. He left the NBB in 1990, after which he joined the board of the Société Générale de Belgique, where he stayed until 1996. He was succeeded by Alfons Verplaetse as governor of the NBB.

Godeaux had a passion for poetry. The poet Arthur Rimbaud was, by far, one of his favorites. Godeaux made a conference on him at the Midis de la Poésie in 1992.

Godeaux died 27 April 2009 at the age of 86.

== See also ==
- Delors Committee

== Sources ==
- Entretien avec le Baron Jean Godeaux à propos de la lutte contre la corruption (French)
- Jean Godeaux, Report on the Measurement of International Capital Flows, Balance of Payments Compilation Guide, published by the International Monetary Fund, p. 65.

| Preceded by Cecil de Strycker | Governor of the National Bank of Belgium; 1982–1989 | Succeeded by Alfons Verplaetse |
