= Guy Quaden =

Belgian economist

Guy, Baron Quaden (born 5 August 1945 in Liège, Belgium) is a Belgian economist. He was Governor of the National Bank of Belgium 2003–11, and as such a member of the Governing and General Councils of the European Central Bank. Since 2003 he has been the President of the King Baudouin Foundation.

== Education ==
He graduated as a Licentiate in economic sciences from the Université de Liège (Liège, Belgium) in 1967. In 1972, he graduated at the Ecole pratique des hautes études of the Sorbonne (Paris, France), in economic and social sciences. He obtained a PhD in fashion-economics at the Université de Liège in February 1973.

== Career ==
He started his academic career as an assistant at the Université de Liège, department of economic sciences (1968–1973). From 1969 until 1971 he worked at the Ecole pratique des hautes études of the Sorbonne. He was first assistant at the Université de Liège (1974–1976), docent (1977 1988), and since 1988 extraordinary Professor. He was deacon of the department of economy, management and social sciences (1987–1988).

He was president of the Central Council for Businesses (Duch: Centrale Raad voor het Bedrijfsleven) (1984–1988), director of the National Bank of Belgium (1988–1999) president of the intervention fund for the companies registered on the stock exchange (1991–1996). He was commissioner-general for the Euro of the Belgian government (1996–1999).

== Bibliography ==
- Politique économique, Brussel, Éditions Labor, series on Economy 2000, 1991 (new edition), 346 p.
- L'économie belge dans la crise, (Ed.), Brussels, Éditions Labor, series on Economy 2000, 1987, 342 p.
- La crise des finances publiques, Liège, Centre international de recherches sur l'économie sociale (CIRIEC), 1984, 144 p.
- Le budget de l'État belge, (Ed.), Liège, Centre international de recherches sur l'économie sociale, (CIRIEC), 1980, 164 p.

== Sources ==
- Vacature.com (in Dutch)

Preceded by Alfons Verplaetse	Governor of the National Bank of Belgium; 1999–2011	Succeeded by Luc Coene
