= Fernand Hautain =

Belgian businessman (1858–1942)

- Born: 1858
- Died: 1942 (aged 83–84)
- Occupation: Businessman

Fernand Hautain (1858–1942) was a Belgian businessman and governor of the National Bank of Belgium (NBB) from 1923 until 1926.

== Career ==
He started his career at an early age and combined working with evening classes and self-tuition. He started working for the NBB at the age of 19, as a bank clerk in the bank's branch in his hometown of Nivelles and three years went on to work as a clerk at the Brussels head office. In 1901, Fernand Hautain was appointed an agent in Philippeville and then in La Louvière, where in 1907 he became the manager of the discount office. As a businessman, he became commissioner for several industrial limited companies. When World War I broke out, he was appointed as a director of the Bank and after the war, in 1923, he succeeded Leon Van der Rest as governor of the NBB.

During his term as governor, the Belgian government tried to deal with the postwar monetary crisis and to stabilise the Belgian franc. In 1926, Emile Francqui, as minister Minister without Portfolio was the architect of the reform plan which would solve the monetary crisis. The bad relationship between Emile Francqui and Fernand Hautain would lead to the dismissal of Fernand Hautain from office. He was succeeded by Louis Franck.

After his dismissal, Hautain returned to the business world, and he remained as deputy administrator of the Société Nationale de Crédit à l'Industrie, which he had helped to establish in 1919.

== Sources ==
- P. Kauch, Fernand Hautain, neuvième Gouverneur de la Banque Nationale de Belgique (1868–1942), Bruxelles, BNB, 1960
- Fernand Hautain

Preceded by Leon Van der Rest	Governor of the National Bank of Belgium; 1923–1926	Succeeded by Louis Franck
