= André-Eugène Pirson =

Belgian liberal politician and civil servant

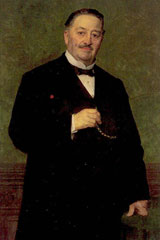
- André-Eugène Pirson
- Born: 21 March 1817; Dinant, United Kingdom of the Netherlands
- Died: 28 December 1881 (aged 64); Brussels, Belgium
- Occupations: politician, civil servant

André-Eugène Pirson (21 March 1817 – 28 December 1881) was a Belgian liberal politician, civil servant, and former governor of the National Bank of Belgium (NBB) from 1877 until 1881. From 1857 to 1861, he was a member of the Belgian Chamber of Representatives.

== Career ==
Born in Dinant, he started his career in the army, but left after four years of service to become the State cashier's agent for the Société Générale de Belgique, first in Oudenaarde, and later in Tournai until 1850, when the National Bank of Belgium was established. André-Eugène Pirson continued his career at the National Bank as an agent for the NBB in Tournai. In 1855, he set up a discount office in Tournai and also worked as a commissioner and administrator of a number of savings banks.

In 1864, he was appointed director of the National Bank, and became vice-governor under Eugène Prévinaire, whom he succeeded in 1877. During his term of office he was confronted by an economic recession and growing tensions within the Latin Monetary Union.

He died in Brussels aged 64 in 1881.

== Sources ==
- De Paepe, Jean-Luc, Raindorf-Gérard, Christiane (ed.), Le Parlement Belge 1831-1894. Données Biographiques, Brussels, Académie Royale de Belgique, 1996, p. 466.
- Closson, E., in : Biographie Nationale, Brussels, Académie Royale des Sciences, des Lettres et des Beaux Arts, 1866–1986, XVII, 1903, kol. 664–665.
- André-Eugène Pirson

Preceded by Eugène Prévinaire	Governor of the National Bank of Belgium; 1877–1881	Succeeded by Alexandre Jamar
