= Albert Goffin =

Belgian banker

Albert Goffin (died 1958) was a Belgian banker, civil servant and governor of the National Bank of Belgium (NBB) from 16 July until 27 November 1941.

He started his career at the NBB in 1907. In 1922, he became administrator delegate at the Banque Liégeoise and administrator of the Banque de Bruxelles in Liège in 1931 after which he returned to the NBB in 1934, where he was in charge of the discount operations. In 1941, he was appointed as governor of the NBB by Secretary General Plisnier, but the Pierlot government in exile at London did not recognise his appointment. On 27 November 1941, Georges Theunis was appointed instead, by the Pierlot-government. After the end of World War II, Goffin was obliged to resign, which brought an end to his career.

== Sources ==
- Albert Goffin

Preceded by Georges Janssen	Governor of the National Bank of Belgium; 1941	Succeeded by Georges Theunis
