= Eudore Pirmez =

Belgian lawyer and liberal politician

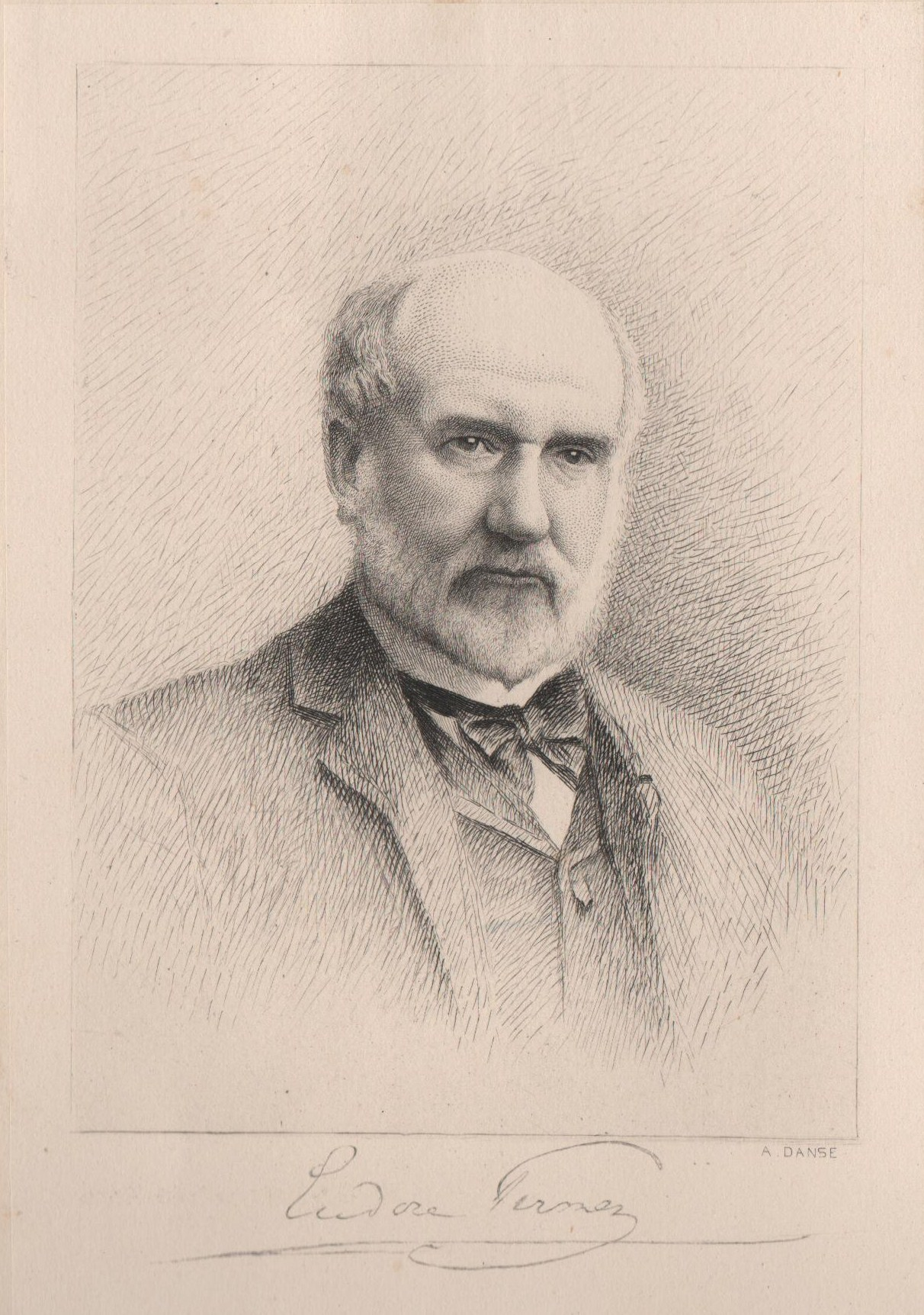
- Born: 14 December 1830; Marcinelle, United Netherlands
- Died: 2 March 1890 (aged 60); Brussels, Belgium
- Occupations: politician, lawyer

Eudore Pirmez (14 December 1830 – 2 March 1890) was a Belgian lawyer and liberal politician. He was director of the National Bank of Belgium, member of parliament and minister.

== See also ==
- Liberal Party

== Sources ==
- Eudore Pirmez, by Albert Nyssens 1893, Polleunis & Ceuterick, Bruxelles. 384 pp
- Liberal Archive
