= Georges Janssen =

Belgian lawyer and civil servant

Georges Janssen (1892 – 9 June 1941) was a Belgian lawyer, civil servant and governor of the National Bank of Belgium (NBB) from 1938 until 1941. During his time as governor he had to defend the Belgium currency from speculative attack during 1938 and he came into conflict during the Nazi occupation during World War II that led to his death.

== Education and early life ==
George Janssen started his career as a lawyer and also built an academic career, as from 1928 he was a professor in the Law Faculty of the Free University of Brussels. His father, Camille Janssen, had been the Governor-General of the Congo Free State. George also worked as an administrator at the Mutuelle Solvay (1928) and the Société Belge de Banque (1932). When in 1935 the Banking Commission was established, he was appointed as its president.

== National bank of Belgium ==
Georges Janssen was appointed as a director of the NBB on 13 October 1937 and one week later became its vice-governor. On the death of Louis Franck, he was appointed governor of the bank on 13 January 1938. He was criticised for combining the positions of governor of the NBB and president of the Banking Commission, which made him resign in September 1938 from the Banking Commission.

In 1938 heavily speculative attacks were launched against the Belgian franc, which he had to ward off in order to protect the Belgian currency. He succeeded in establishing the leadership of the National Bank in monetary matters. During his term as governor, arrangements were made to safeguard the Belgian gold reserves by transferring them abroad before the outbreak of World War II.

== During the second world war ==
When the war broke out in May 1940, he followed the Belgian government to France but returned to Belgium, with the approval of Camille Gutt, after the Franco-German armistice in June 1940. Although he resumed his post as governor of the National Bank, he almost immediately came into conflict with the Nazis who occupied Belgium. The conflict centered on such matters as payment for the occupation costs, the circulation of banknotes and the Bank’s gold, which had been transferred to the United Kingdom. In addition, he also came into conflict on the situation of the Université libre de Bruxelles. The mounting conflicts with the occupying forces and his deteriorating health would lead to his death on 9 June 1941.

Preceded by Louis Franck	Governor of the National Bank of Belgium; 1938–1941	Succeeded by Albert Goffin
