= Alexandre Jamar =

Belgian businessman and liberal politician (1821-1888)

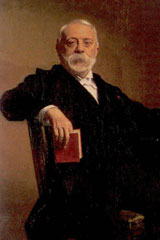
- Alexandre Jamar
- Born: 6 November 1821; Brussels
- Died: 15 August 1888 (aged 66); Brussels

Alexandre Marie Auguste Jamar (6 November 1821 – 15 August 1888) was a Belgian businessman, liberal politician, and former governor of the National Bank of Belgium (NBB) from 1882 until 1888. From 1868 to 1870, he was the minister of public works in the government of Walthère Frère-Orban.

== Career ==
Born in Brussels on 6 November 1821, Jamar started his career at the age of 17, when he became a partner in the family printing business of his brother. Later on he became a commissioner for the Banque de Belgique and had a seat on the first management board of the Caisse générale d'épargne et de retraite and the Crédit Communal de Belgique.

Jamar became a censor at the NBB in 1865 and a member of the discount committee of the NBB. In 1870 he became the director of the NBB and in 1882 the governor of the National Bank of Belgium. During his time in office, he had to deal with the consequences of an economic depression. In addition he had to deal with problems within the Latin Monetary Union, caused by the refusal of Belgium to sign the new convention of 1885. His experience in the printing business resulted in better-quality banknotes.

Jamar died in Brussels on 15 August 1888.

== Sources ==
- Kauch, P., in: Biographie Nationale, Brussels, Académie Royale des Sciences, des Lettres et des Beaux Arts, 1866–1986, XXIX, 1956–1957, kol. 719–722.
- Alexandre Jamar

Preceded by André-Eugène Pirson	Governor of the National Bank of Belgium; 1882–1888	Succeeded by Eugène Anspach
