= Alfons Verplaetse =

Belgian economist (1930–2020)

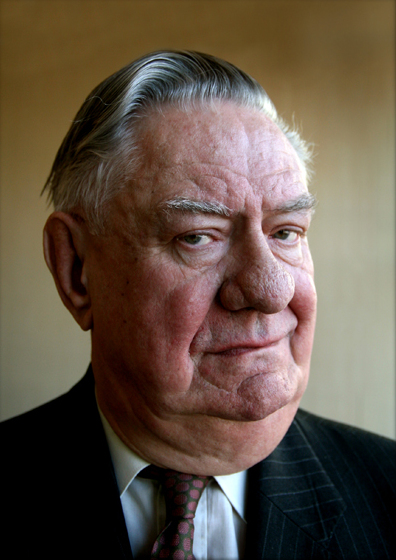

Governor of the National Bank of Belgium
- In office 1989–1999
- Preceded by: Jean Godeaux
- Succeeded by: Guy Quaden

Personal details
- Born: Alfons Remi Emiel, Viscount Verplaetse; 19 February 1930 Zulte, Belgium
- Died: 15 October 2020 (aged 90) Bonheiden, Belgium
- Occupation: economist, civil servant

Alfons "Fons" Remi Emiel, Viscount Verplaetse (19 February 1930 – 15 October 2020) was a Belgian economist who served as Governor of the National Bank of Belgium (NBB) from 1989 until 1999. He was one of the architects of the devaluation of the Belgian Frank in 1982 when he worked at the cabinet of Wilfried Martens in the government Martens V. As governor of the NBB, he prepared the entry of Belgium to the euro in 1999.

== Career ==
Verplaetse was born on 19 February 1930, in Zulte. After he graduated in commercial sciences from the Catholic University of Leuven, Alfons Verplaetse started his career at the National Bank in 1953, where he worked at the Research department. In 1982, in the government Martens V, he was seconded to the Prime Minister's Office as associate chief of staff, and subsequently as head of the Economic Office until 1987. Together with Jacques van Ypersele de Strihou, he was one of the architects of the economic recovery policy launched by the February 1982 devaluation of the Belgian franc. The plan was mainly conceived by four people meeting in Verplaetse's holiday residence in Poupehan, a tiny village in the Ardennes. Later Poupehan became a term for backroom politics.

He was appointed as a director of the NBB in 1985 and became vice-governor in 1988 and succeeded Jean Godeaux as governor in 1989. In 1990, the Belgian franc was linked to the German mark, in order to stabilise the Belgian currency. The reform of the Belgian monetary policy instruments in 1991 was another step to stabilise and improve the Belgian monetary situation.

An important challenge of his tenure as governor of the NBB was the European monetary integration, which was initiated under Jacques Delors. Alfons Verplaetse became a member of the board of governors of the European Monetary Institute in 1994 and of the Governing Council of the European Central Bank in 1998.

Verplaetse was supposed to retire in 1997, but remained in office until 1999 to oversee the introduction of the euro to replace the Belgian franc, on 1 January 1999, as the official currency of Belgium. He was succeeded by Guy Quaden as governor of the National Bank. On 10 March 1997, Verplaetse was elected President of the Bank for International Settlements. He was replaced on 8 February 1999 by Urban Bäckström. After his retirement, he made his expertise available in the service of economic and financial development in the Democratic Republic of Congo.

Verplaetse died from COVID-19 on 15 October 2020, during the COVID-19 pandemic in Belgium.

Preceded by Jean Godeaux	Governor of the National Bank of Belgium; 1989-1999	Succeeded by Guy Quaden
