= National Bank of Belgium =

Belgian central bank

National Bank of Belgium Nationale Bank van België (in Dutch) Banque nationale de Belgique (in French) Belgische Nationalbank (in German)

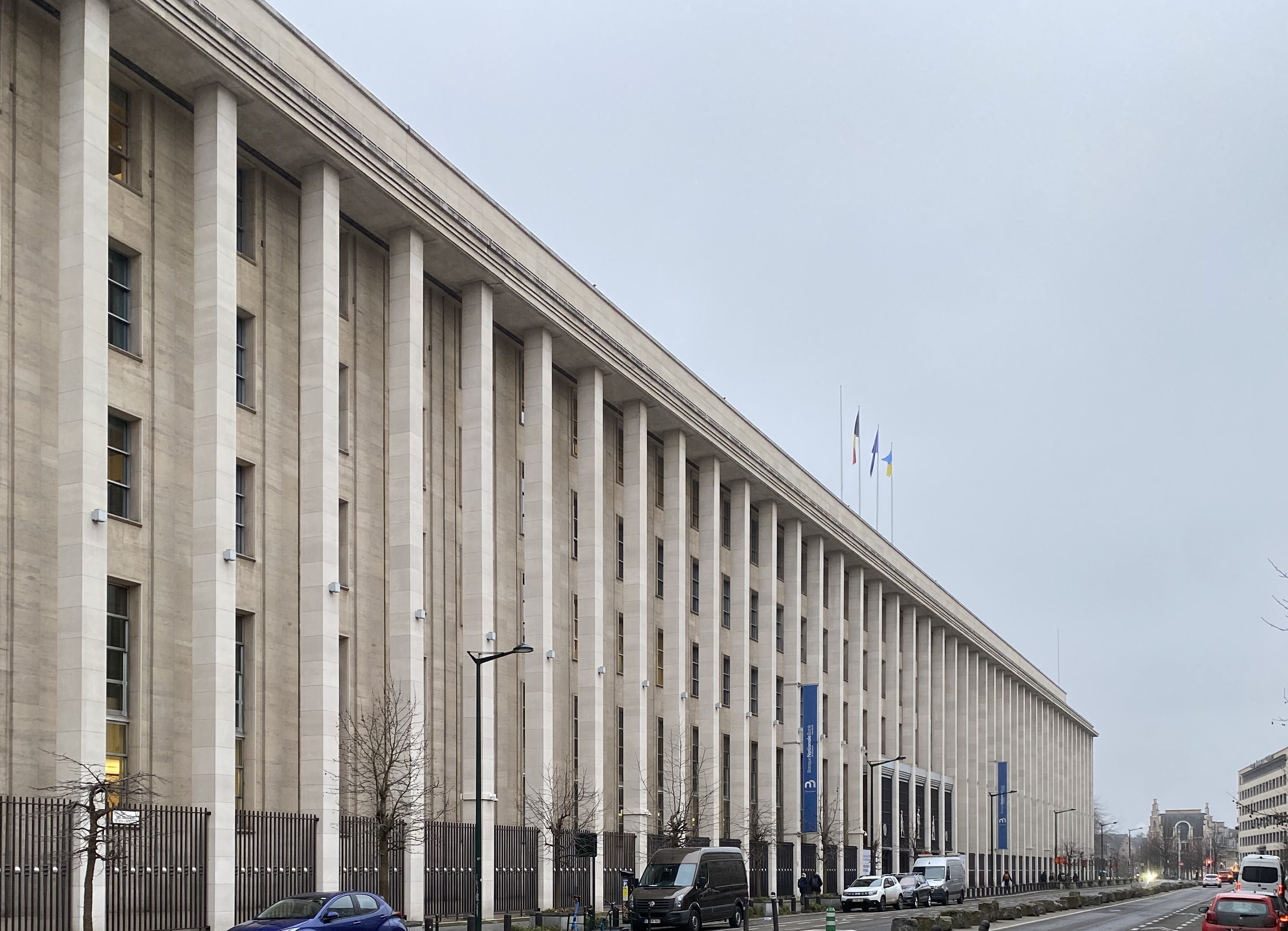
- Central bank of: Belgium
- Headquarters: Brussels
- Established: 5 May 1850
- Ownership: Government of Belgium (50%); Public float (50%); Traded as: Euronext Brussels: BNB
- Governor: Pierre Wunsch
- Reserves: 8 450 million USD
- Succeeded by: European Central Bank (1999)^{1}
- Website: www.nbb.be
- ^{1} The National Bank of Belgium still exists but many functions have been taken over by the ECB.

The National Bank of Belgium (NBB; Dutch: Nationale Bank van België, (Note: Flemish pronunciation: [nɑ(t)ɕoːˌnaːlə ˈbɑŋk fɑm ˈbɛlɣijə].) NBB; French: Banque nationale de Belgique, (Note: French pronunciation: [bɑ̃k nɑsjɔnal də bɛlʒik].) BNB; German: Belgische Nationalbank, (Note: German pronunciation: [ˈbɛlɡɪʃə natsi̯oˈnaːlˌbaŋk].) BNB) is the national central bank for Belgium within the Eurosystem. It was the Belgian central bank from 1850 until 1998, established by law of 5 May 1850 and issuing the Belgian franc.

The Belgian government has held half of the National Bank's equity since the aftermath of World War II. It thus remains one of relatively few central banks whose equity capital is partly in private hands, with stock being traded on Euronext Brussels.

In addition to its monetary role, the NBB is also a financial supervisory authority. Since 2011, it has been Belgium's prudential supervisor. In the area of financial market infrastructure, it stands out as supervisor of Euroclear and lead overseer of SWIFT. It also operates a central securities depository of its own, the National Bank of Belgium Securities Settlement System or NBB-SSS. Additional tasks include the management of foreign currency reserves; the collection, circulation and analysis of economic and financial information; a role of financial ambassador to international economic and financial bodies; and services for the Belgian State, the Belgian financial sector, and the general public.

In that capacity, the NBB increasingly implements policies set at the European Union level. It is the national competent authority for Belgium within European Banking Supervision. is a voting member of the respective Boards of Supervisors of the European Banking Authority (EBA) and European Insurance and Occupational Pensions Authority (EIOPA). It is Belgium's designated National Resolution Authority and plenary session member of the Single Resolution Board (SRB). It provides the permanent single common representative for Belgium in the Supervisory composition of the General Board of the Anti-Money Laundering Authority (AMLA). It is also a member of the European Systemic Risk Board (ESRB).

== History ==
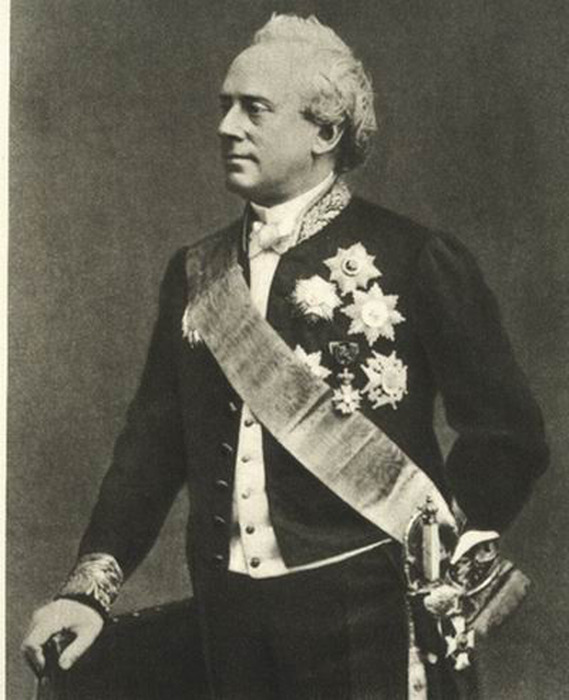
Walthère Frère-Orban (1812–1896), architect of the creation of the National Bank

=== Creation and early decades ===
The National Bank was created by Minister Walthère Frère-Orban in 1850 with a unique hybrid status: in the form of a limited company, but with the main objective to carry out missions of general interest entrusted to it by legislation of 5 May 1850, including replacing the Société Générale de Belgique (SGB) as fiscal agent of the Belgian government. It came from a protracted process of negotiation with the Société Générale and the Banque de Belgique, until then the two main financial institutions in the country which had been negatively impacted by financial turmoil in 1848. As part of the same train of reform, Frère-Orban established the Caisse générale de retraite, which later became the Caisse Générale d'Épargne et de Retraite. Initially the National Bank was mainly an issuing and discounting bank, leaving the business of longer-term credit and investment to the SGB and others.

The National Bank's design was widely viewed as an improvement on earlier central banks. It soon became a source of reference in other countries, including the Netherlands with the reform of De Nederlandsche Bank in 1864 and Japan with the creation of the Bank of Japan in 1882. The NBB's prominent influence over the Bank of Japan's institutional design was paralleled 15 years later in terms of architectural influence, as Bank of Japan architect Tatsuno Kingo was inspired by the buildings designed by Hendrik Beyaert for the National Bank in Brussels and Antwerp. In 1910, a report of the U.S. National Monetary Commission noted: "The history of the National Bank of Belgium is of special interest to the student of banking systems because of [...] the ability of its founders to garner up the results of the experience of Belgium and of other countries in what they conceived to be the best attainable form of organization". Its charter was renewed in 1872 and in 1900, each time giving rise to extensive parliamentary debates about its mandate and setup.

=== World War I and interwar period ===
On 26 August 1914, shortly before the outbreak of World War I, minister of Finance Michel Levie ordered the National Bank to send its reserve assets to London. In retaliation, the German occupier force withdrew the National Bank's issuing privileges by decree of 20 November 1914, and entrusted it to the SGB instead. The SGB, however, still used the National Bank's printing presses. Once the war was over, the National Bank regained its issuing privileges.

During the European banking crisis of 1931, the National Bank had large holding in pound sterling and therefore incurred significant losses when the United Kingdom exited the Gold standard in September 1931. It had to rely on an emergency non-interest-bearing loan from the Belgian government to stay afloat.

=== World War II and postwar development ===
When Belgium was invaded in May 1940, its leadership and much of the staff again left the country and initially relocated to France. In late June, the German forces in Brussels forced the creation of a Bank of Issue (French: Banque d'Émission) to supply the occupied country's currency needs and to finance the payments of occupation costs. Following France's defeat, however, Governor Georges Janssen led the National Bank's return to Brussels by mid-July, even though he ensured that a representative in London could manage the Bank's foreign assets. The Bank of Issue kept acting as an adjunct to the National Bank, particularly by financing the clearing claims on Germany.

After Janssen's death in June 1941, the London-based Belgian government in exile repudiated the appointment of its Brussels-based successor Albert Goffin and instead expanded the London office into a fully-fledged administration-in-exile of the National Bank led by former Prime Minister Georges Theunis from late November 1941. A series of agreements in 1940 and 1941 resulted in the Belgian Congo joining the Sterling area. The Banque du Congo Belge thus became an important financial agency of the exiled government during the war, and temporarily severed links with its occupied head office in Brussels.

Meanwhile, the National Bank under occupation in Brussels kept operating, led until the liberation of Belgium by Goffin who was simultaneously President of the Bank of Issue, and with a German Commissioner, Hans von Becker, overseeing both institutions. The National Bank and Bank of Issue together financed the German war effort by printing large amounts of Belgian currency, triggering high inflation.

Before the war started, the National Bank had prudently moved one third of its gold reserves to the United Kingdom and another third to the United States and Canada. in early 1940, Finance Minister Camille Gutt directed the relocation of the last third, or 200 tons, to France. The gold was shipped from Ostend to Bordeaux and taken in custody by the Bank of France. With the advance of German troops, the latter further moved the National Bank's gold in early June 1940 to Lorient, a military port. The National Bank wanted the gold to be transported from there to the United States, but the French Navy shipped it instead to Dakar, where it landed on 28 June 1940 and was subsequently moved inland to Kayes in present-day Mali. In late 1940, collaborationist French Prime Minister Pierre Laval decided to hand over the National Bank's gold to the Reichsbank; the gold eventually reached Berlin in May 1942, via French Algeria and Marseille, and was melted into new ingots with false year marks at the Reichsmünze. On 5 February 1941, the London-based National Bank under Theunis's leadership sued the Bank of France in New York, eventually reaching a settlement in October 1944 by which the Bank of France agreed to full retrocession. The Bank of France in turn was able to recover 130 tons after the gold was found by U.S. forces together with stolen art in a salt mine in Merkers, Thuringia and reclaimed by the National Bank via the Tripartite Commission for the Restitution of Monetary Gold.

The National Bank was part-nationalized following the end of World War II. Unlike the cases of the Bank of England and Bank of France, both of which were fully nationalized, the Belgian government left the National Bank's prior private-sector shareholders in ownership of half of its equity.

=== 21st century ===
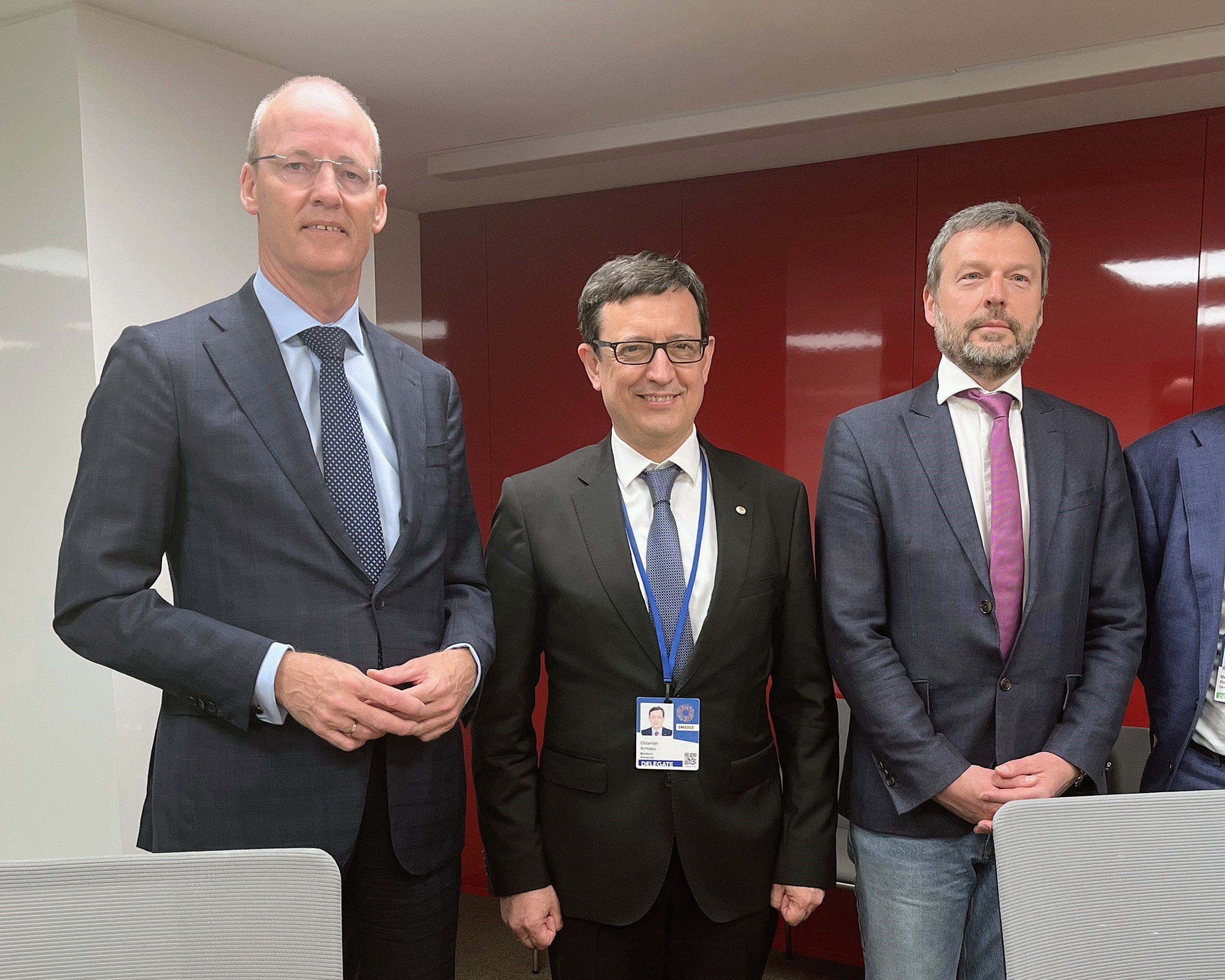
Current NBB gorvenor Pierre Wunsch (right) metting with fellow bank gorvenors Octavian Armașu (centre; NBM) and Klaas Knot (DNB) in Washington D.C., April 2022

Following the turmoil that affected Fortis and Dexia in late 2008, an overhaul of financial regulation in Belgium led to the closure of the Belgian Banking Commission and the entrusting of prudential supervision to the National Bank, while the Financial Services and Markets Authority was created to take over the oversight of market integrity and conduct-of-business regulation.

The printing works of the National Bank closed its doors in August 2020, and the building that hosted them in the center of Brussels was sold in 2021. Since then, the NBB no longer prints euro banknotes itself. At the end of 2020, the Bank had 1,680 full-time equivalent workers.

In September 2022, the quotation of the NBB stock was suspended after its stock price collapsed due to information that the bank would make losses as a consequences of the abrupt interest rates hikes decided by the European Central Bank. Despite these losses, there are currently no plans for the NBB to request a recapitalization from the Belgian government. The NBB made clear that it could operate with negative equity.

== Ownership ==
The NBB is one of the rare central banks in Europe that still is a private entity with private shareholders (other examples are Greece, Switzerland and Italy).

The Federal Government of Belgium owns half of the National Bank's shares. the rest of the shares are listed on Euronext Brussels and widely dispersed among market participants, with no shareholder known to hold more than one percent of total equity as of early 2024.

== Head office ==
The National Bank was initially located on the Rue Royale/Koningsstraat, at the corner of what is now the Rue du Moniteur/Staatsbladsstraat, in a building that is no longer extant. In 1859, it acquired properties on the nearby Rue du Bois Sauvage/Wildewoudstraat, and commissioned architects Hendrik Beyaert and Wynand Janssens to design a new building. Construction work started in 1860, with sections opened in 1865, the whole building completed in 1874 and interior decoration finishing in 1878. That building was subsequently repurposed as the formal apartment of the National Bank's governor until 1957, and is still known as the Hôtel du Gouverneur. The ground floor and first floor of the Hôtel du Gouverneur are still preserved in a state close to that in the 1870s and are used by the National Bank as a venue for events. The building features sculpture by Guillaume de Groot, Jean Schoonjans and Édouard Fiers, and painted ceilings by Joseph Stallaert and Faustin Besson.

The entire block was remodeled in the mid-20th century with a state-of-the-art complex built for the bank as part of the broader transportation and urban transformation project known as the North–South connection. Architect Marcel Van Goethem was appointed project architect on 1 February 1940, but the reconstruction process was suspended during the German occupation of Belgium during World War II and construction work only started in 1946. The new building features a 200-meters-long monumental Stripped Classicism façade on the Boulevard de Berlaimont/Berlaimontlaan and a monumental banking hall. The initial plans foresaw the demolition of the Hôtel du Gouverneur, but preservationists won the decision to keep it standing in 1948. The construction works were eventually completed in 1958. The complex designed by Van Goethem includes the printing presses building on the other side of the Boulevard de Berlaimont, connected to the main headquarters by an underground tunnel. It features exterior sculpture by Marcel Rau, including aluminium figures of Mercury, Minerva, and Vulcan above the bank's entrance on the Boulevard de Berlaimont; and two bronze statues of kneeling women, respectively by George Grard on the southern side and Charles Leplae to the north. In 2023, the National Bank announced plans for comprehensive renovation of its head office complex, on a design by firms KAAN Architecten and LOW Architecten, combined with the construction of a cash logistics center in Zellik, an outer northwestern suburb of Brussels.

In 1982, the National Bank opened its own museum in the Hôtel du Gouverneur. In 2018, the museum moved to new premises in the former 1872 headquarters of the Union du Crédit de Bruxelles, a cooperative bank, which the National Bank had purchased in 1979 and renovated in the 2000s.

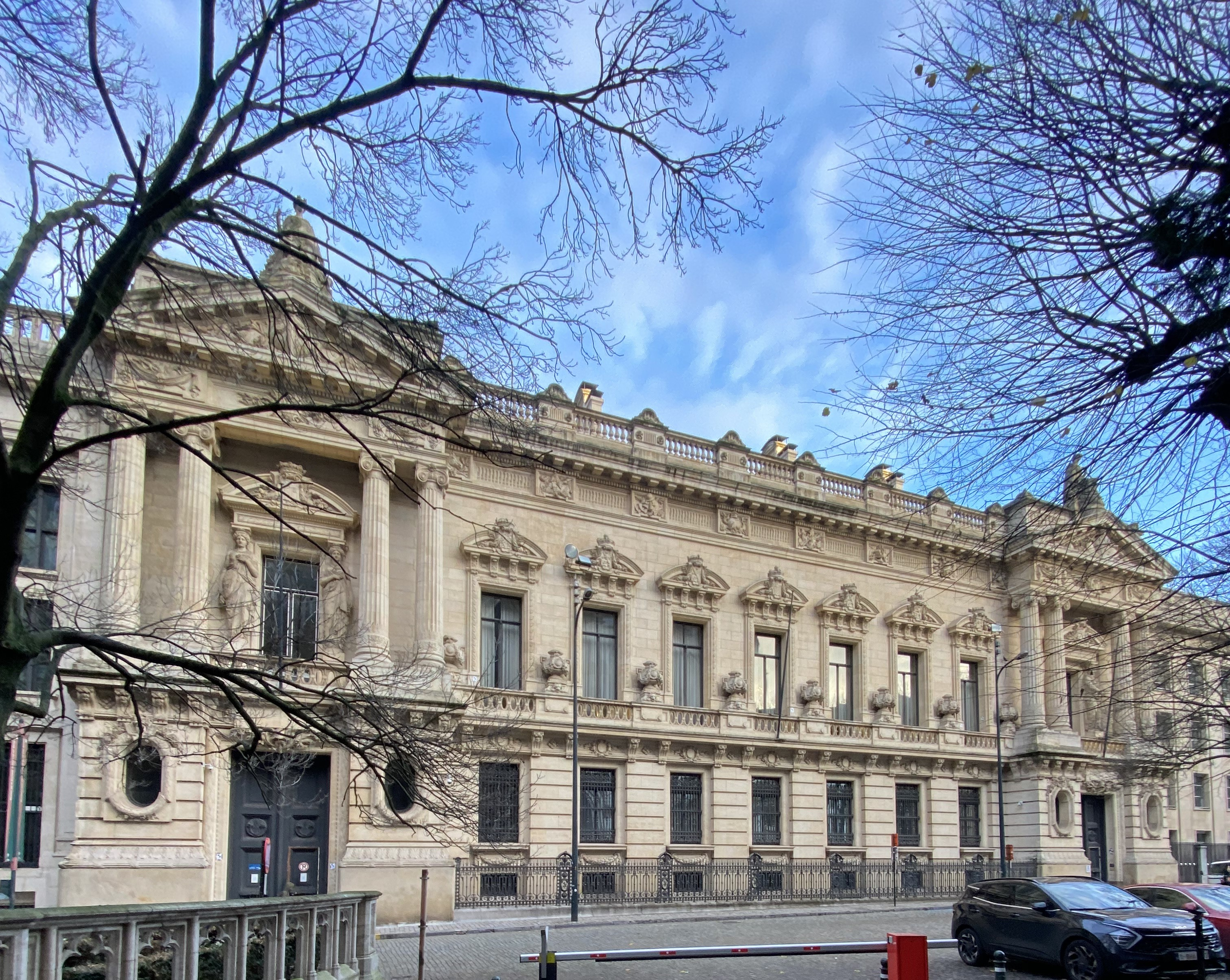
The Hôtel du Gouverneur, former main office of the National Bank erected in the 1860s

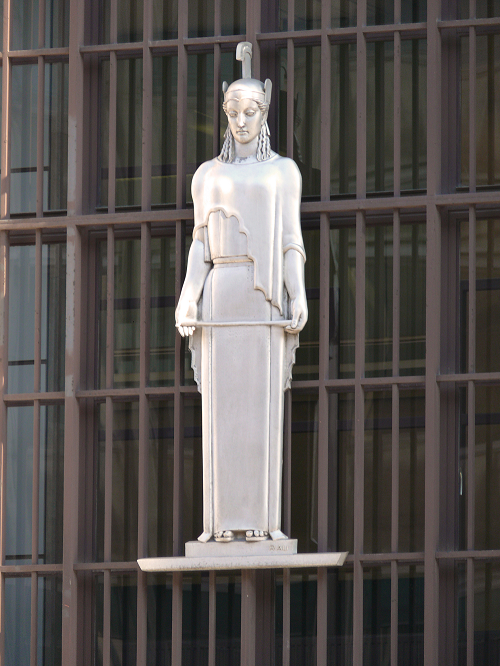
Sculpture of Minerva by Marcel Rau above the bank's main entrance

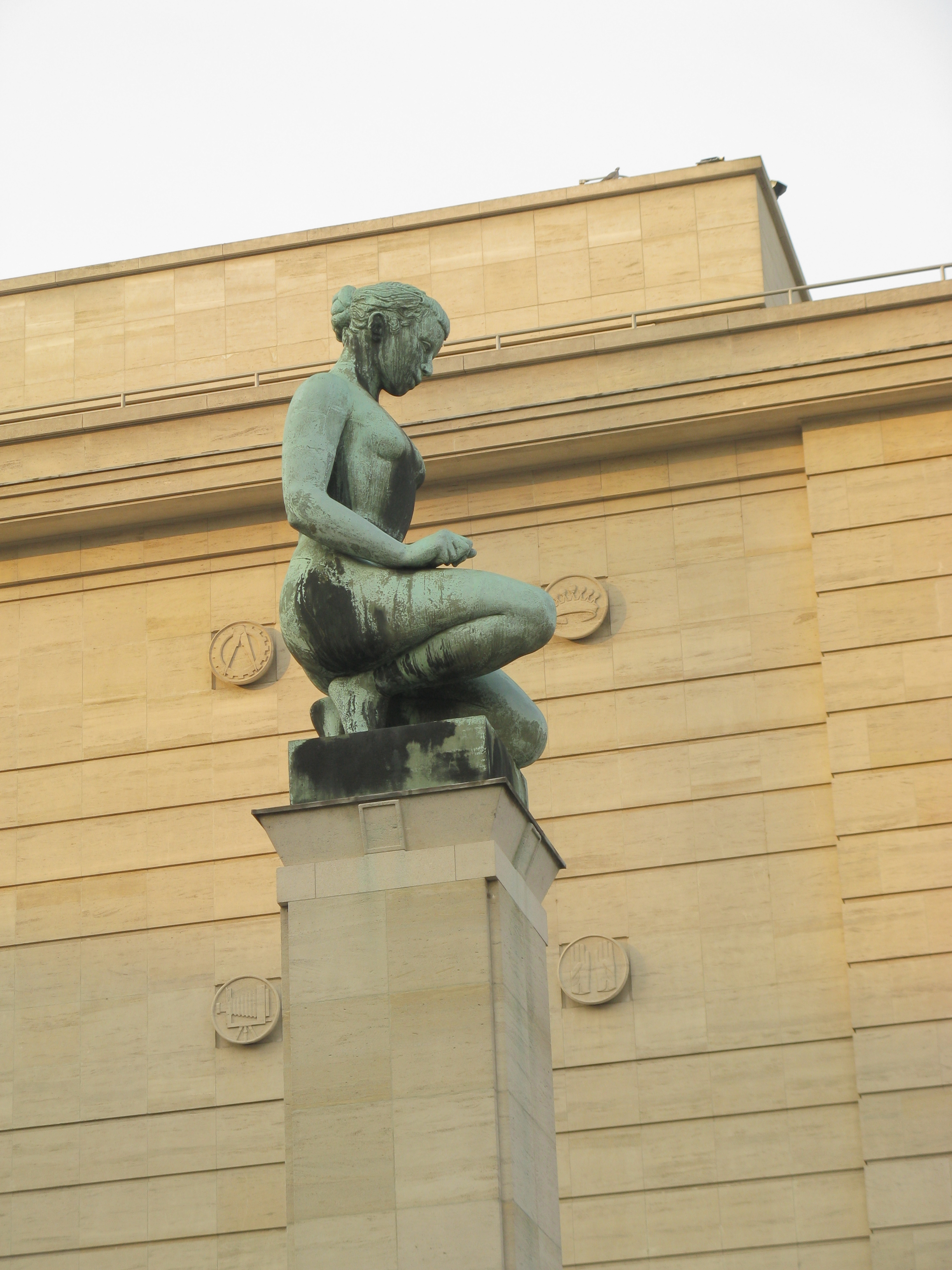
Sculpture by Charles Leplae

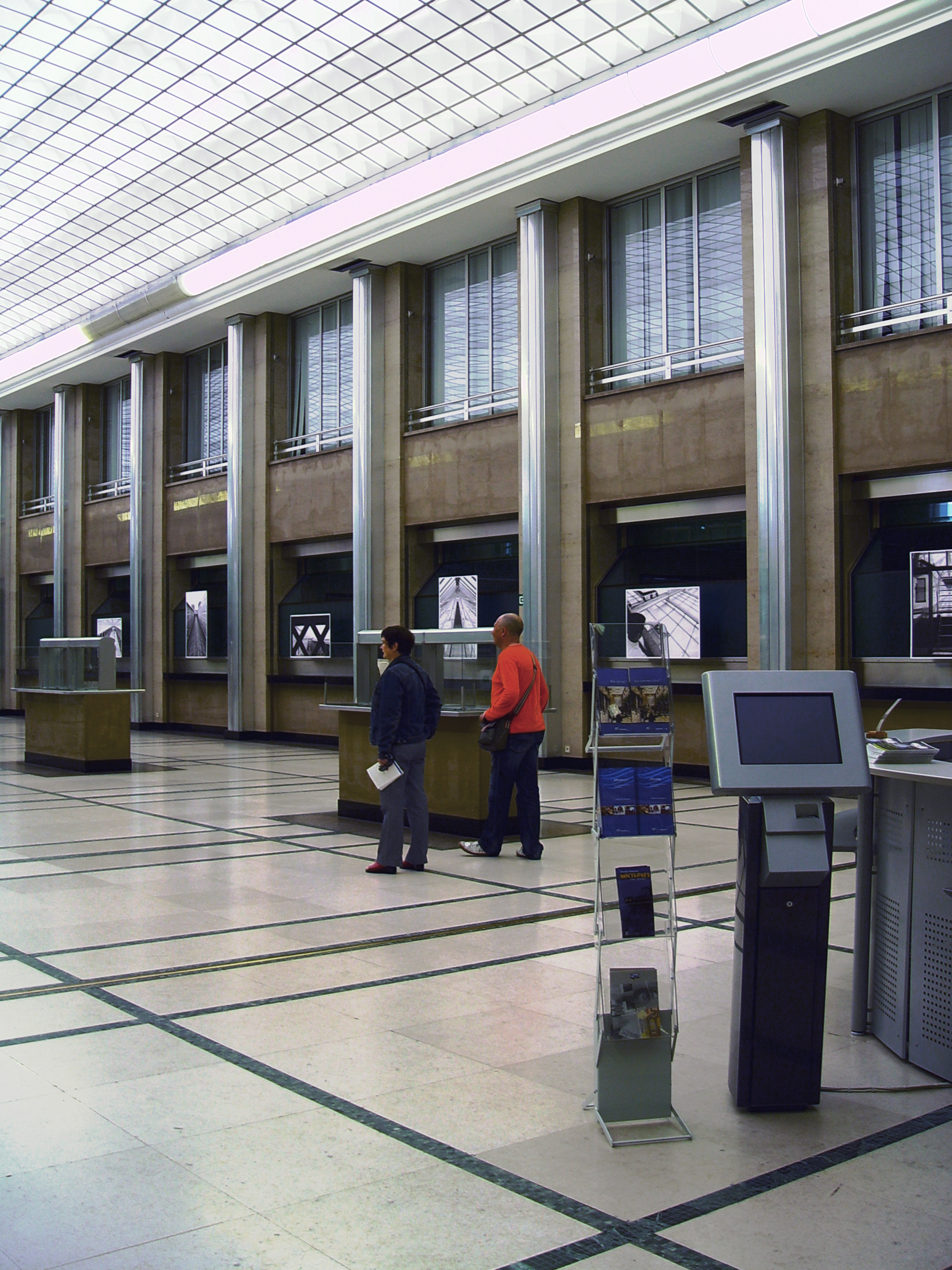
Banking hall

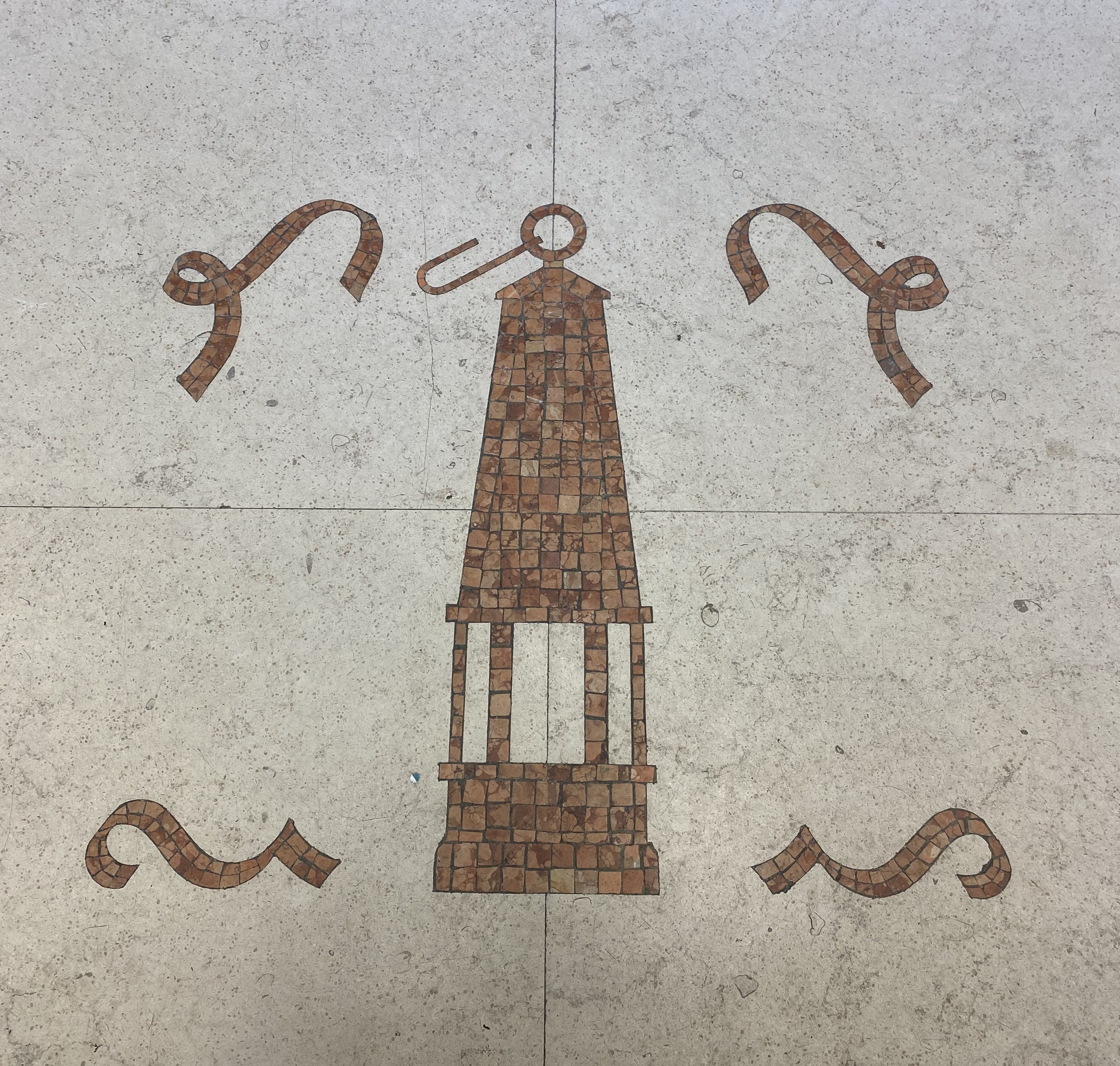
Mosaic of a safety lamp representing the Belgian mining industry in the entrance lobby

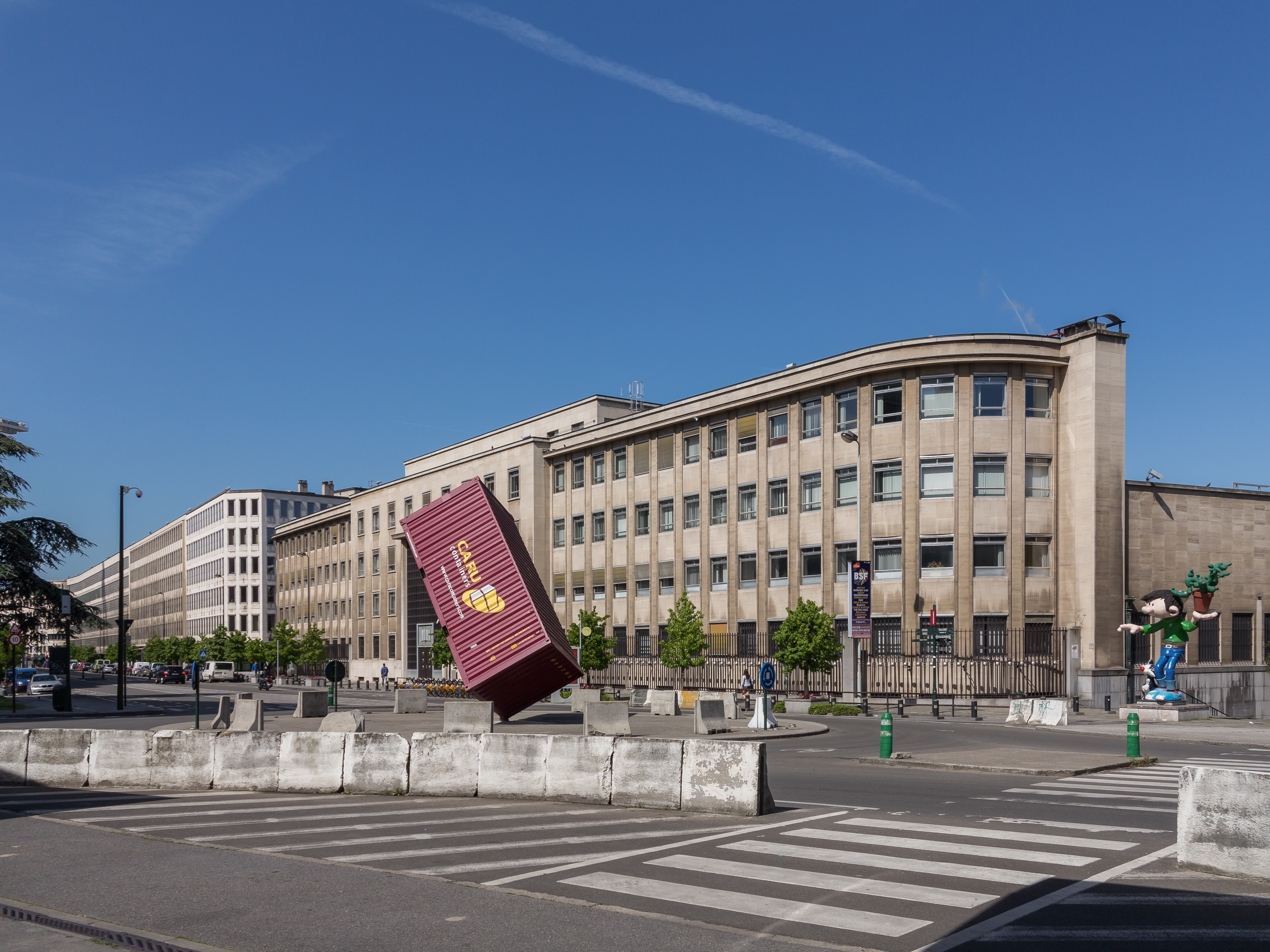
Printing presses building, with sculpture The Container by Luc Deleu in front

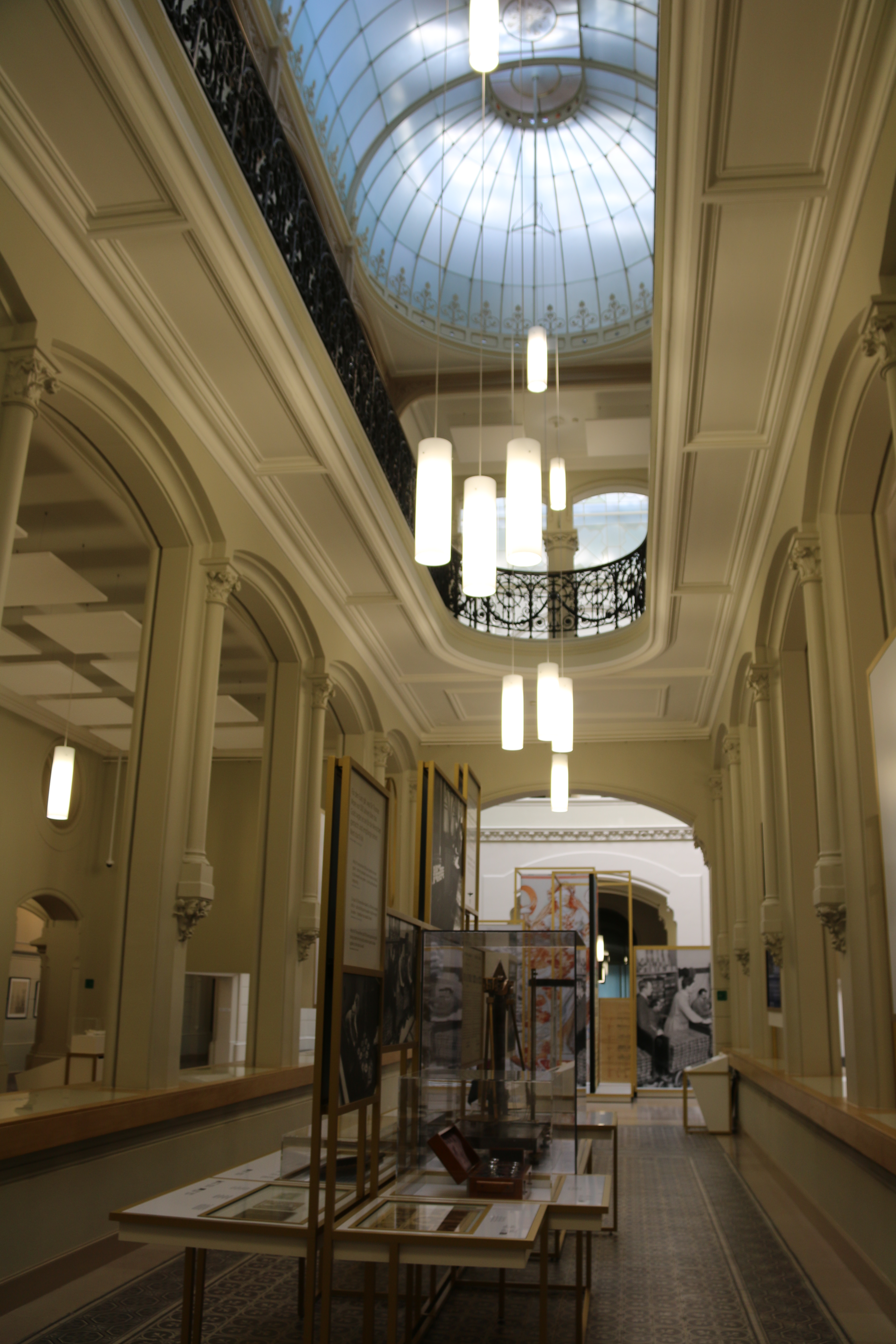
Former building of the Union du Crédit de Bruxelles, home of the Museum of the National Bank since 2018

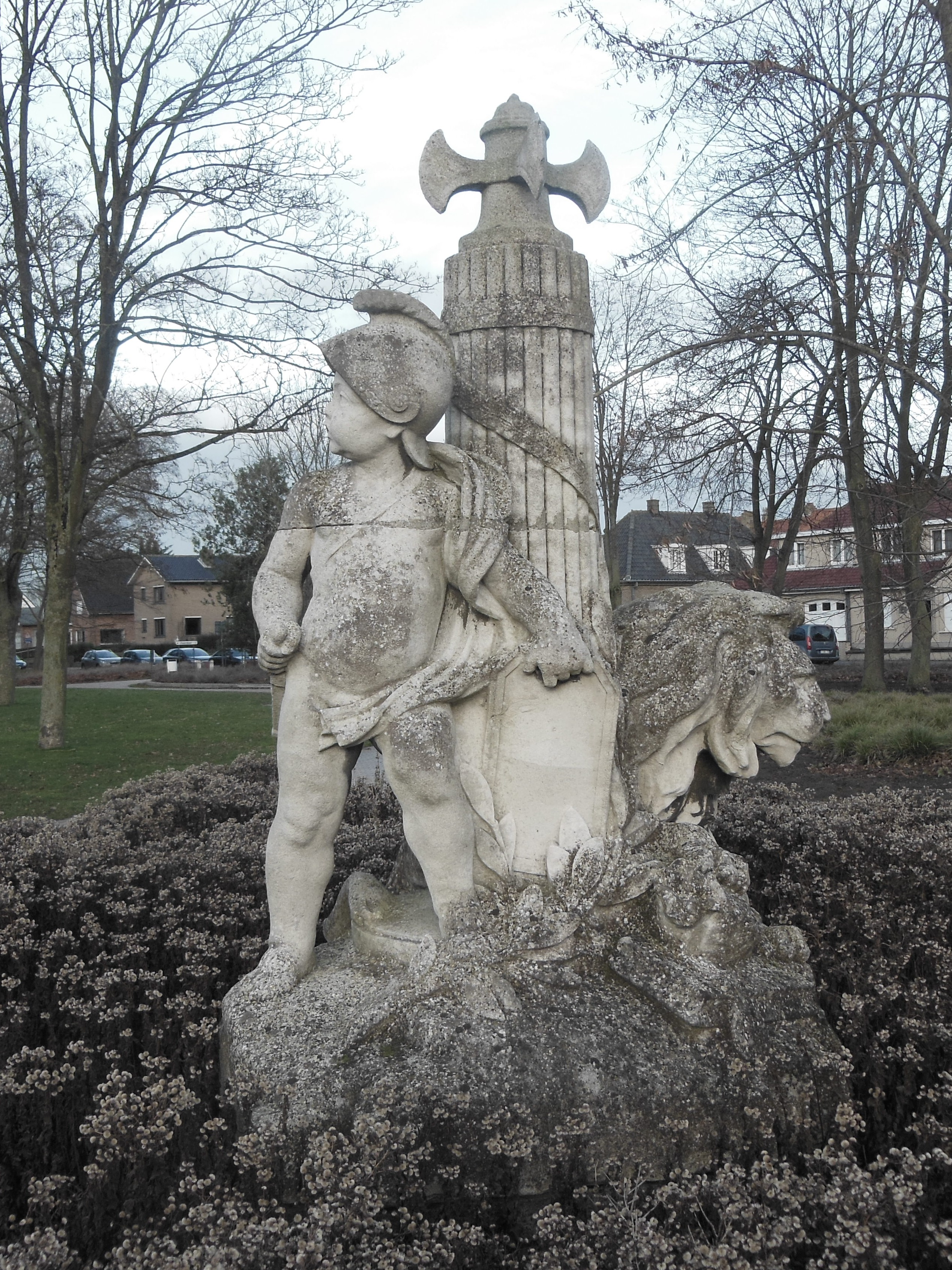
Sculpture from "Beyaert's Tower", one of the bank's buildings demolished in the late 1940s, relocated in Leopold Park

== Branches ==
The National Bank used to maintain branches and offices throughout the country as well as Luxembourg, reaching a total of 43 locations between 1936 and 1974. The branch in Antwerp was an opulent eclectic building designed by Hendrik Beyaert, the architect of the bank's main office in Brussels, and completed in 1879. Most of these branches included a discount office (French: comptoir d'escompte), technically a separate entity owned by local individuals which acted as a guarantor for paper discounted by the bank.

In Luxembourg, following a bilateral agreement of 23 May 1935 modifying the terms of the Belgium–Luxembourg Economic Union, the National Bank on 16 August 1935 purchased an urban mansion that had been erected in 1882–1883 on a design by local architect Oscar Belanger, on 43 avenue Monterey. After renovation, that building opened to the public on 2 November 1936 as the National Bank's Luxembourg office (French: agence), was elevated in 1963 to the status of branch (French: succursale), then closed on 31 December 1998 after the creation of the Central Bank of Luxembourg (BCL) had made it redundant. The BCL acquired the building on 8 May 2001 and had it demolished in 2003 to erect a new facility known as the Monterey Building, inaugurated in 2007.

The National Bank gradually shed its network of branches from 1974 onward, as they no longer served an operational purpose. The prominent Antwerp branch closed on 30 September 2013, and was subsequently converted into commercial offices. The last two branches, in Kortrijk and Liège, were closed in 2018.

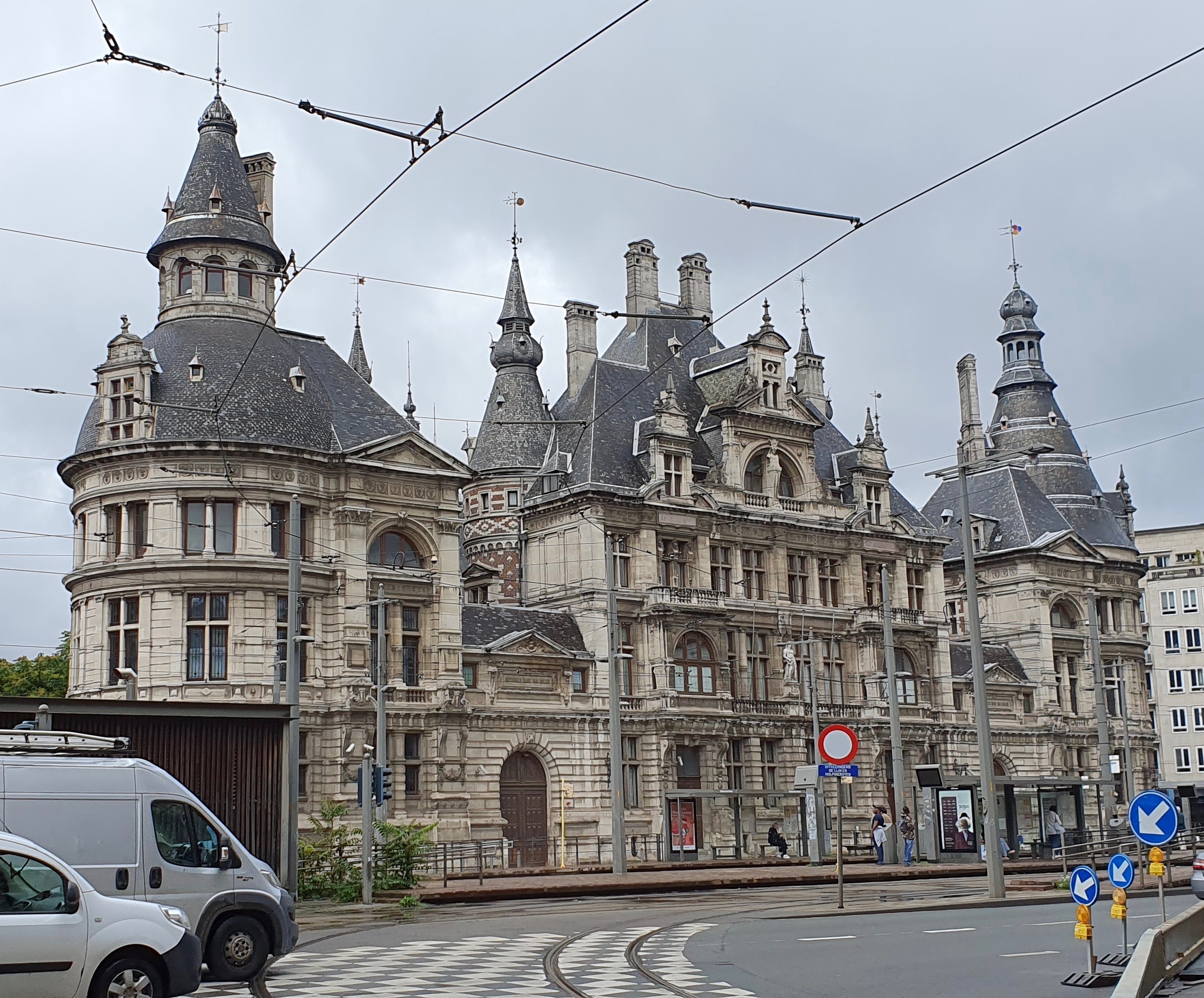
Former branch building in Antwerp

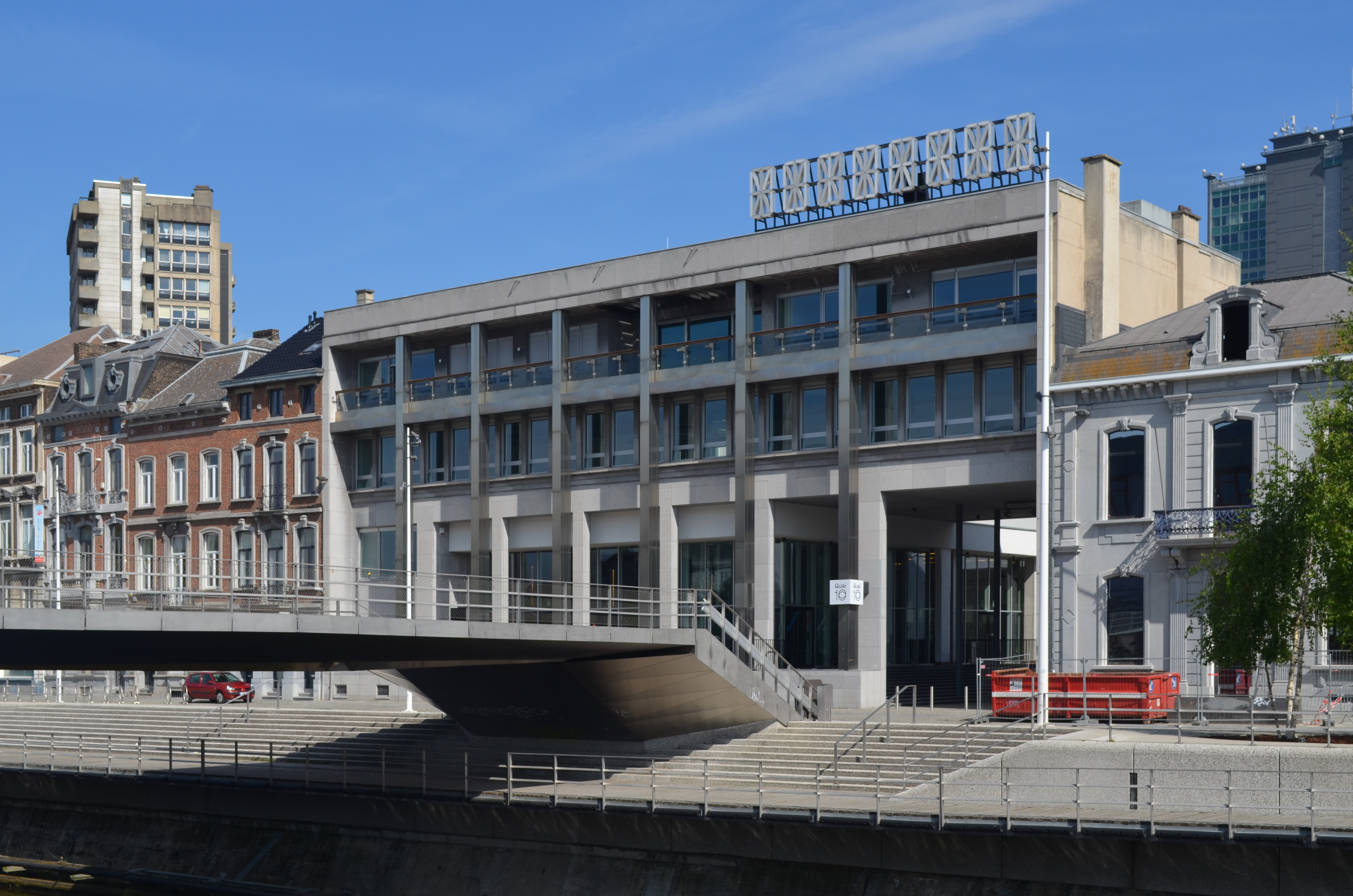
Former branch building in Charleroi from 1851 to 2002 (reconstructed in the meantime)

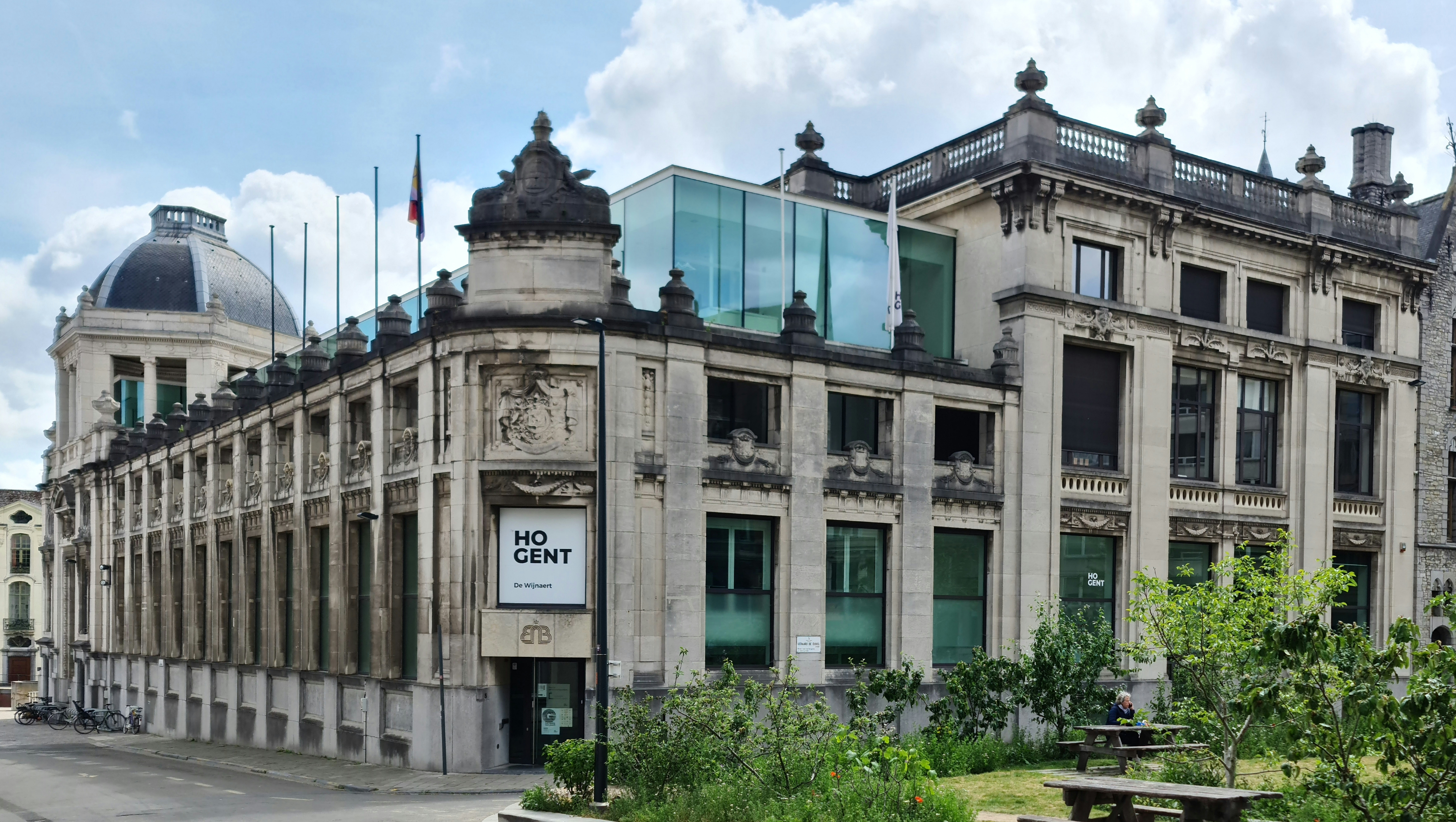
Former branch building in Ghent

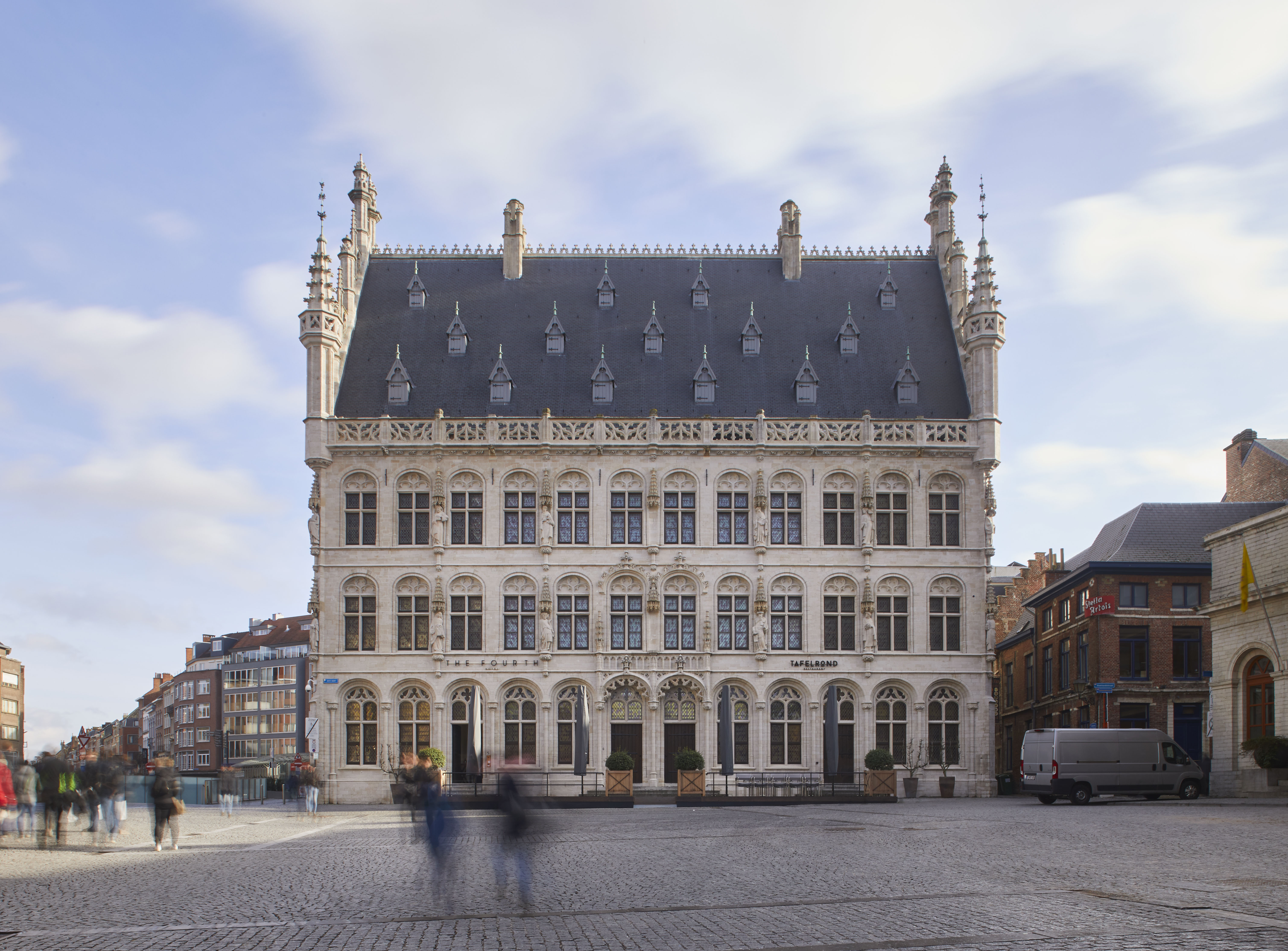
Tafelrond, reconstructed after World War I and branch building in Leuven from 1930 to 2002

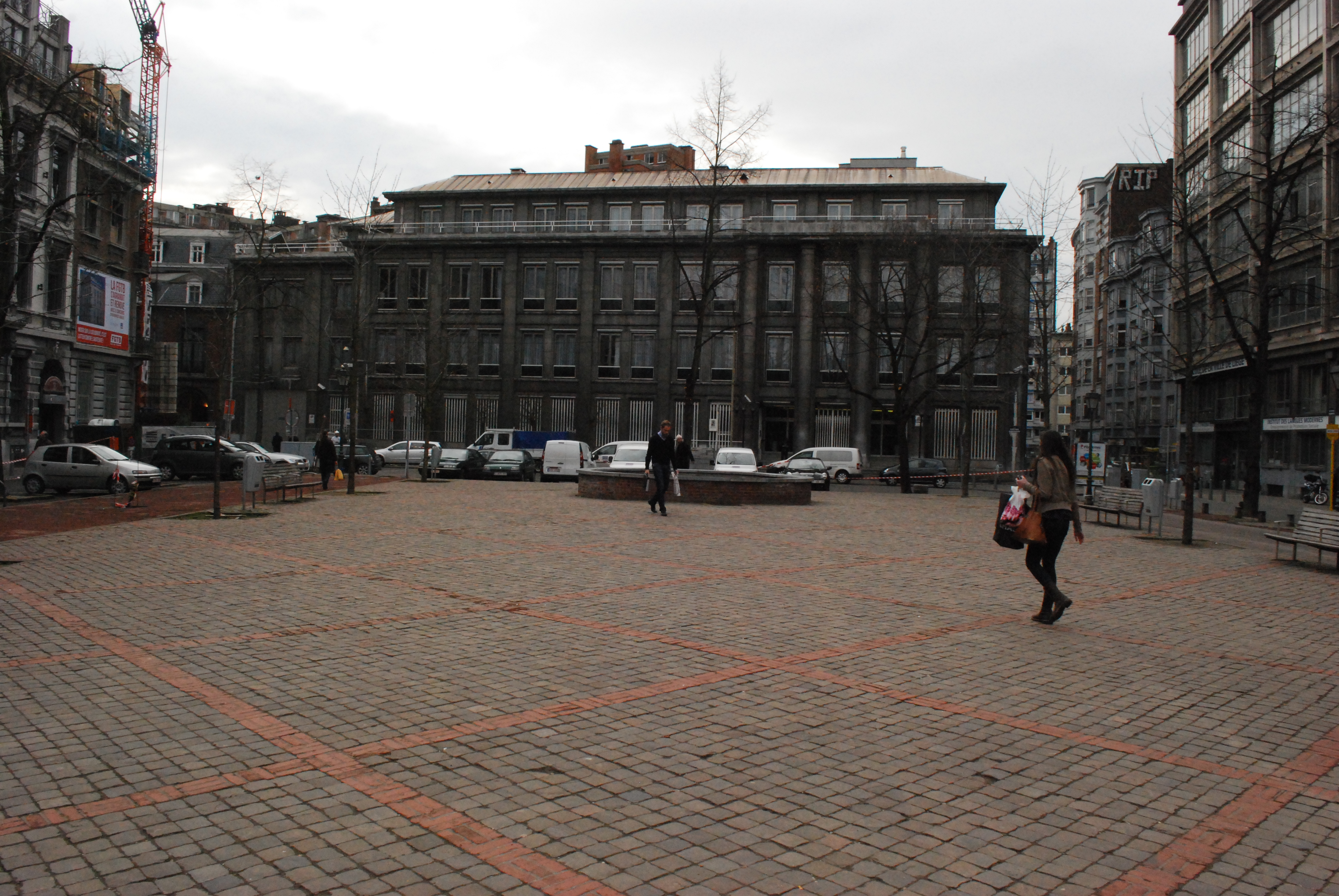
Extension built 1963-1968 of the former branch building in Liège from 1851 to 2018

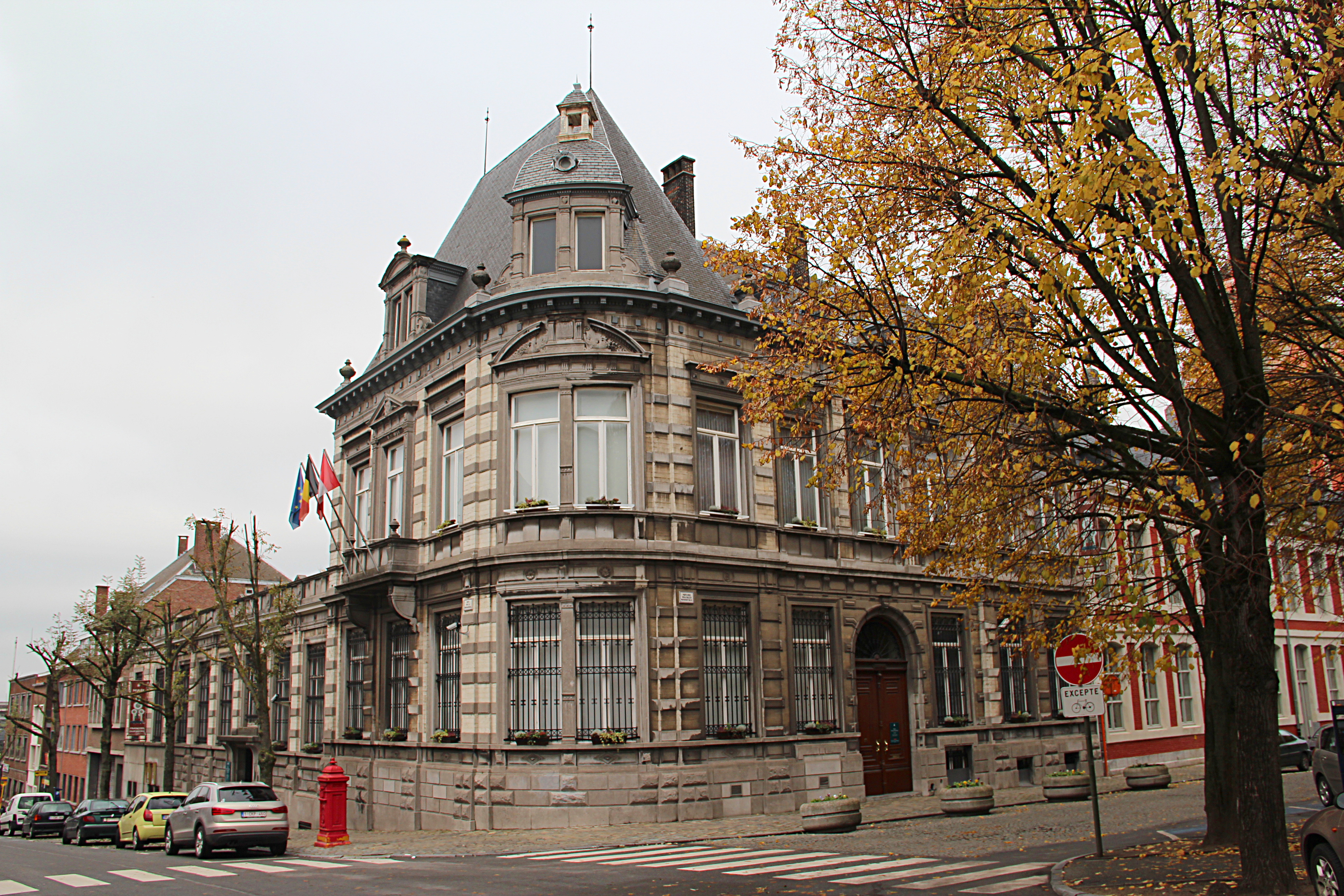
Former branch building in Mons from 1851 to 1993, repurposed in 1994 as Museum François Duesberg

== Leadership ==
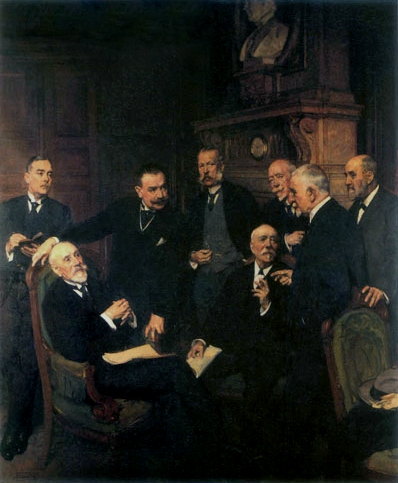
Meeting of the Administrative Council of the National Bank (1918) by Herman Richir

=== Governors ===
- François-Philippe de Haussy (1850–1869)
- Eugène Prévinaire (1870–1877)
- André-Eugène Pirson (1877–1881)
- Alexandre Jamar (1882–1888)
- Eugène Anspach (1888–1890)
- Victor Van Hoegaerden (1891–1905)
- Théophile de Lantsheere (1905–1918)
- Leon Van der Rest (1918–1923)
- Fernand Hautain (1923–1926)
- Louis Franck (1926–1937)
- Georges Janssen (1938–1941)
- Albert Goffin (1941–1944, in Brussels)
- Georges Theunis (1941–1944, in London)
- Maurice Frère (1944–1957)
- Hubert Ansiaux (1957–1971)
- Robert Vandeputte (1971–1975)
- Cecil de Strycker (1975–1982)
- Jean Godeaux (1982–1989)
- Alfons Verplaetse (1989–1999)
- Guy Quaden (1999–2011)
- Luc Coene (2011–2015)
- Jan Smets (2015–2019)
- Pierre Wunsch (2019–present)

=== Vice-Governors ===
(List to be expanded)

- Luc Coene (2003–2011)
- Mathias Dewatripont (2014–2015)
- Pierre Wunsch (2015–2019)

== See also ==
- Belgian franc – Currency of Belgium from 1832 to 2002
- Economy of Belgium
- Jonathan-Raphaël Bischoffsheim – Belgian banker, businessman and philanthropist (1808–1883)
- List of banks in Belgium
- List of central banks
- List of financial supervisory authorities by country
- Museum of the National Bank of Belgium – Central bank museum in Brussels, Belgium
