= Museum François Duesberg =

Museum in Belgium

Coordinates: 50°27′15″N 3°56′46″E

Museum François Duesberg was opened on 21 September 1994 and is devoted to decorative arts from the period 1775 to 1825. The museum is located in Mons (Hainaut) opposite the collegiate Saint Waltrude Church in the former buildings of the National Bank of Belgium. It houses a large collection of objects in perfect condition: it has a prestigious collection of clocks and mantel clocks, exceptional gilded French bronzes, porcelain (mainly from Paris and Brussels), pottery, jewelry (including the famous Mons-punch), and numerous items of similar quality.

It was founded by François Duesberg and his wife Betty whose collections focus on the periods of Louis XVI, that of Charles X of France and of the First French Empire under Napoleon.

== Gallery ==
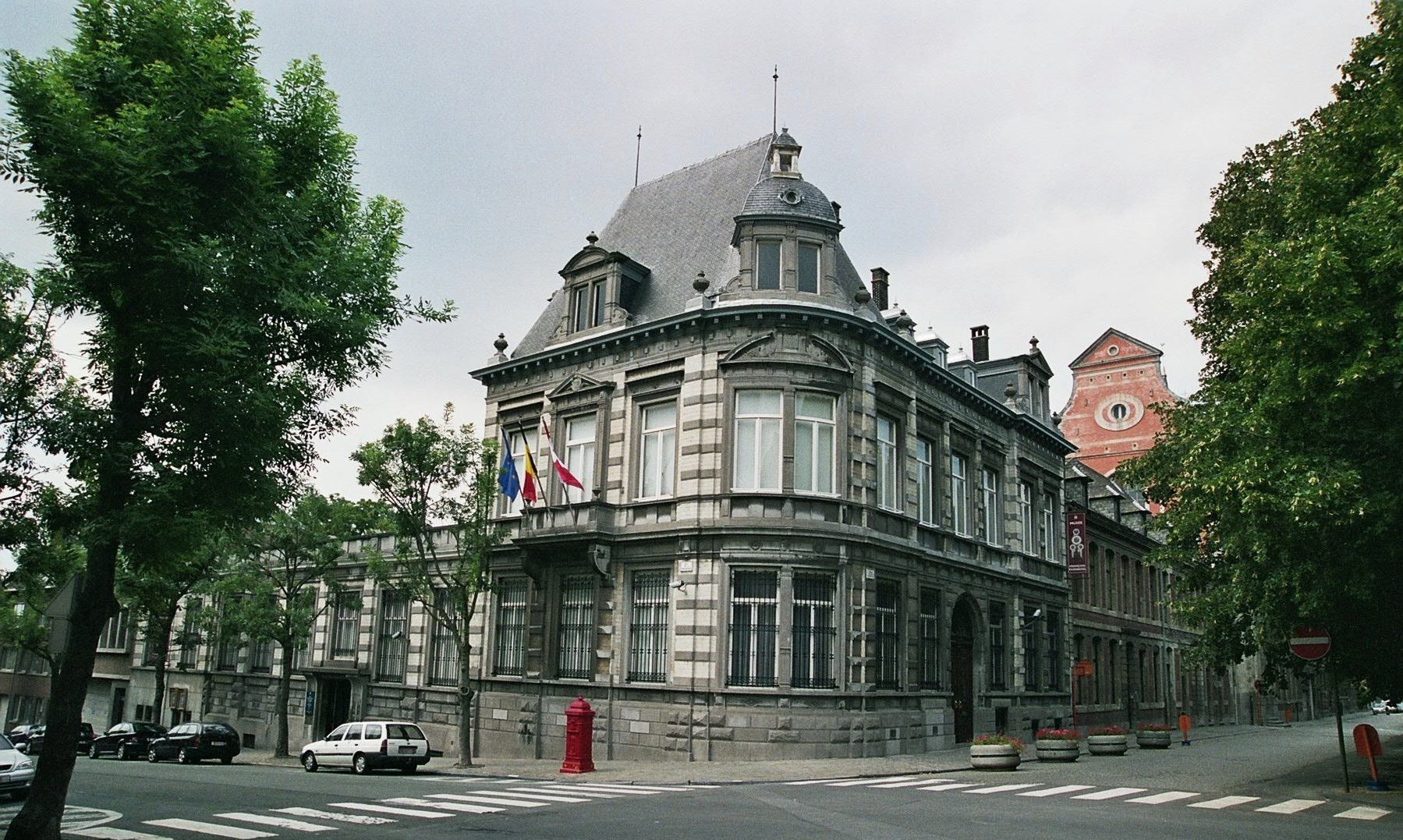
The museum on 12 Square Franklin Roosevelt. Entry of the museum on 2 Rue de la Houssière.

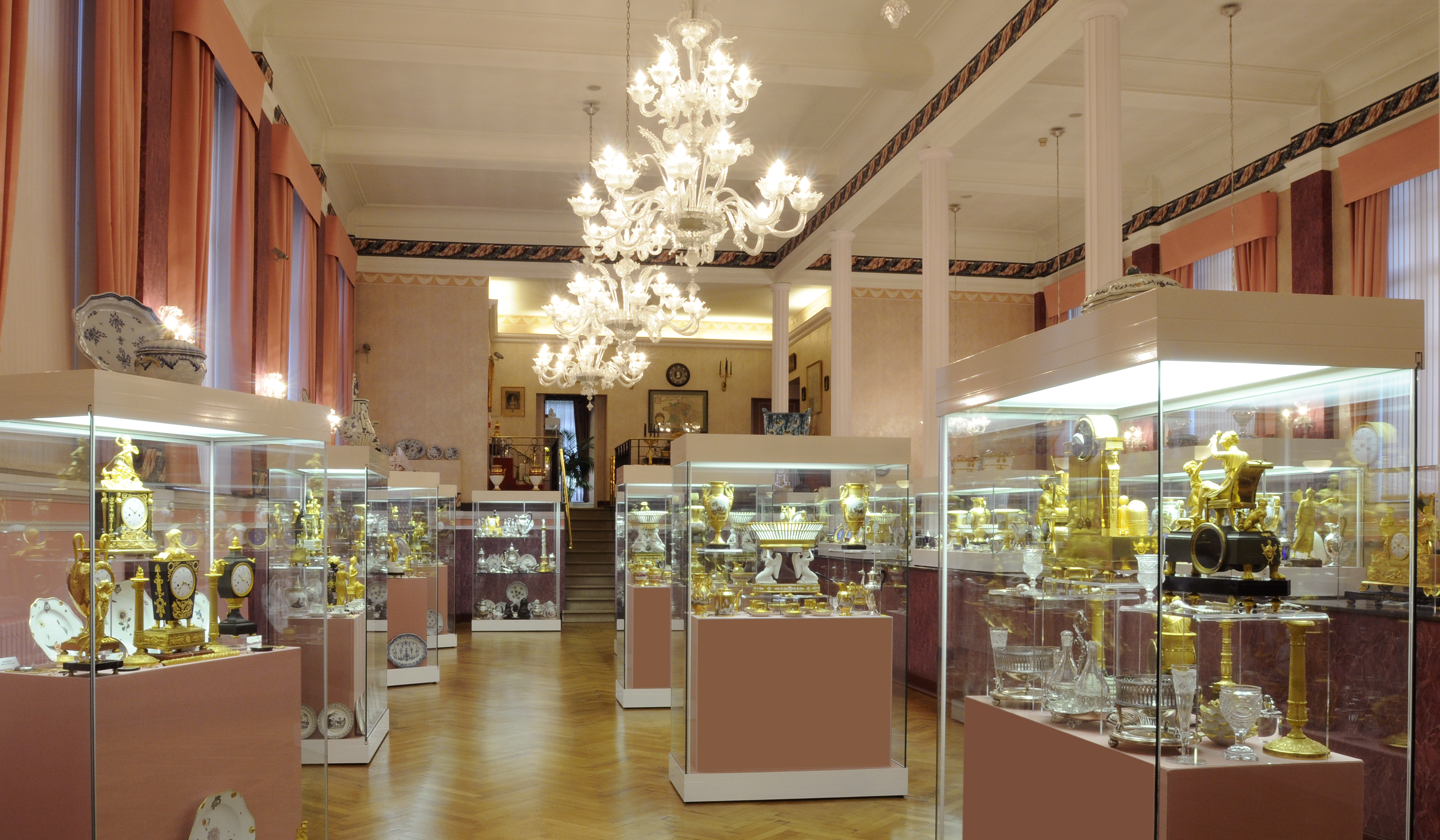

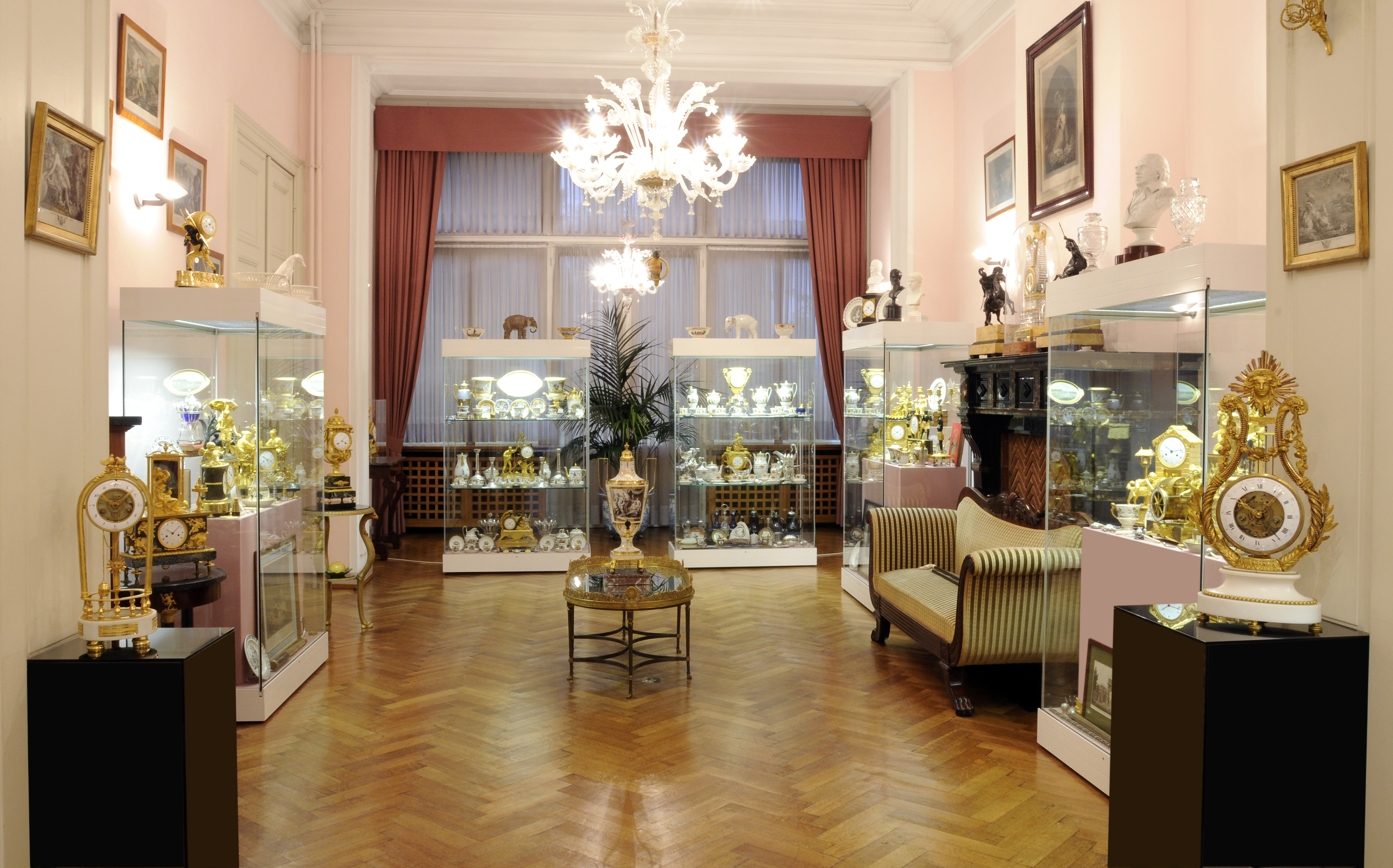

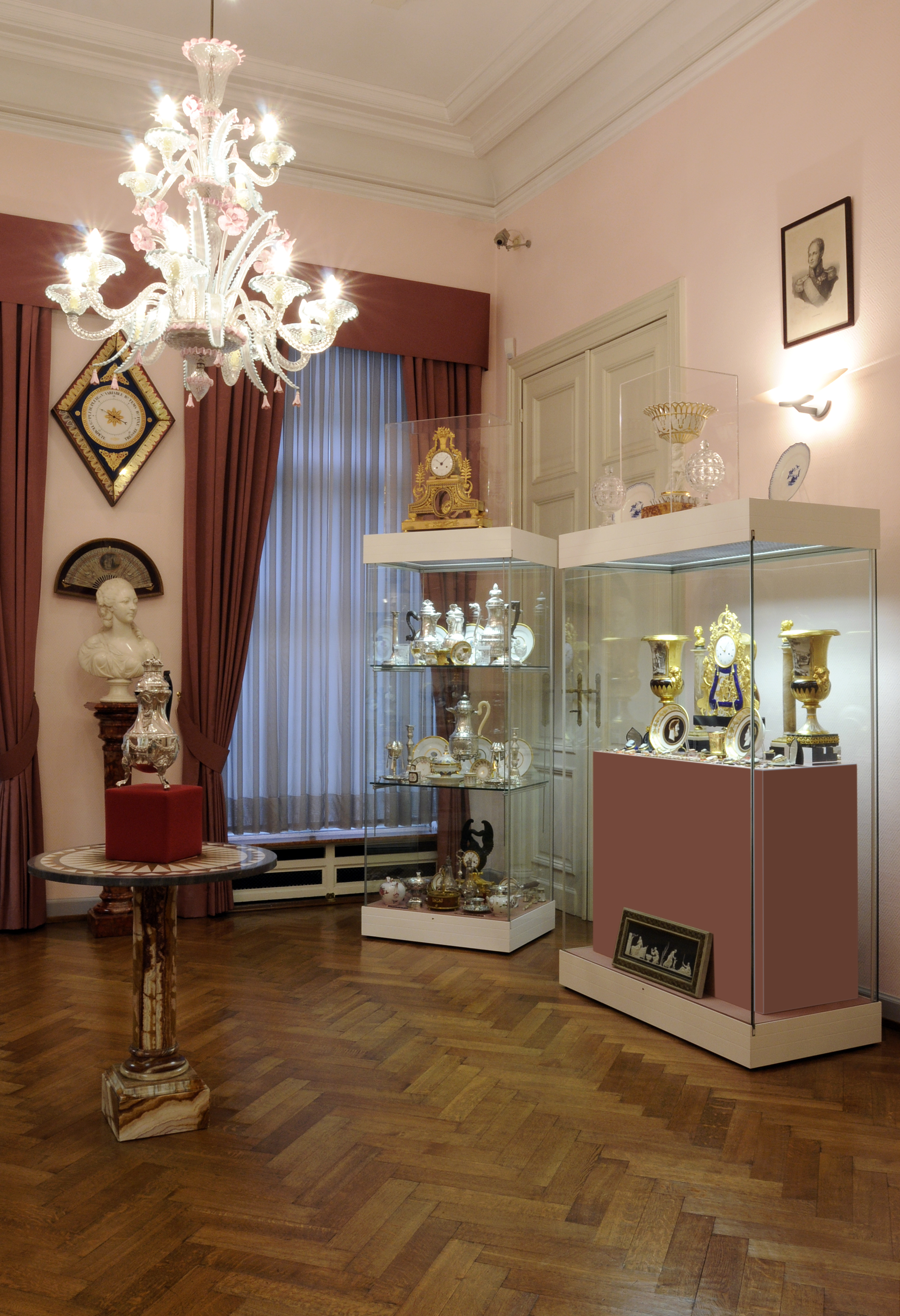

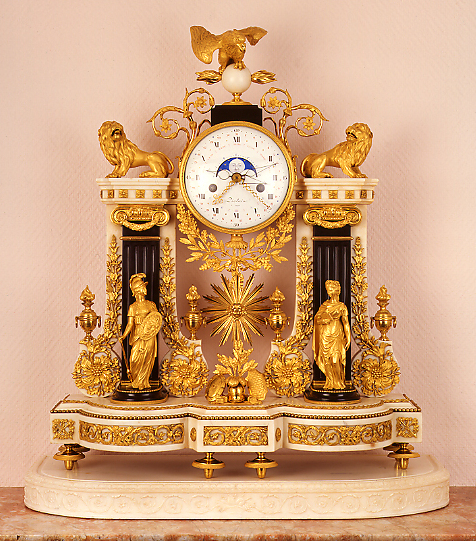
