= List of Belgian provincial governors =

This is the list of current Belgian province governors.

== Current governors ==
Province	Governor	Party	Office entered
Antwerp	Cathy Berx	CD&V	2008
East Flanders	Carina Van Cauter	Anders	2020
Flemish Brabant	Jan Spooren	N-VA	2020
Hainaut	Tommy Leclercq	PS	2013
Liège	Hervé Jamar	MR	2015
Limburg	Jos Lantmeeters	N-VA	2020
Luxembourg	Olivier Schmitz		2016
Namur	Denis Mathen	MR	2007
Walloon Brabant	Gilles Mahieu	PS	2015
West Flanders	Carl Decaluwé	CD&V	2012

== Past governors (since 1830) ==
=== Antwerp ===
#	Governor	Party	Office entered	Office left
1.	François de Robiano		1830	1831
2.	Jean-François Tielemans		1831	
3.	Charles Rogier		1831	1832
3.	Charles Rogier		1834	1840
4.	Henri de Brouckère		1840	1844
5.	Jules Malou		1844	1845
6.	Jan Teichmann		1845	1862
7.	Edward Pycke d'Ideghem		1862	1887
8.	Charles du Bois de Vroylande		1887	1888
9.	Edward Osy de Zegwaart		1889	1900
10.	Fredegand Cogels		1900	1907
11.	Louis de Brouchoven de Bergeyck		1907	1908
12.	Ferdinand de Baillet-Latour		1908	1912
13.	Gaston van de Werve de Schilde		1912	1923
14.	Georges Holvoet		1923	1945
15.	Richard Declerck		1946	1966
16.	Andries Kinsbergen		1967	1993
17.	Camille Paulus		1993	2008
18.	Cathy Berx	CD&V	2008	present

=== Brabant (1830–1995) ===
- 1830 Pierre-François Van Meenen (temporary)
- 1830 - 1834 Feuillien-Charles-Marie-Joseph de Coppin
- 1834 - 1838 Goswin baron de Stassart (liberal)
- 1839 - 1845 Guillaume-Jean-Antoine baron de Viron
- 1845 - 1852 Charles Liedts (liberal)
- 1852 - 1855 P. Annemans (ad interim)
- 1855 - 1860 Charles Liedts (liberal)
- 1861 - 1862 P. Annemans (ad interim)
- 1862 - 1883 François Dubois-Thorn
- 1883 - 1884 Theodore Heyvaert (liberal)
- 1885 - 1906 Auguste Vergote
- 1906 - 1928 Henri Emile de Béco
- 1928 - 1935 François-André Nens
- 1935 - 1942 Albert Houtart
  - 1942 - 1943 replaced by Jean-Mathieu Croonenberghs
  - 1943 replaced by Frans Wildiers
  - 1943 - 1944 vervangen door Adrien Gilles de Pelichy
- 1944 - 1945 Jean Herinckx (ad interim)
- 1945 Jules Hansez (ad interim)
- 1945 - 1951 Fernand Demets (liberal)
- 1951 - 1976 Jean de Neeff (catholic party)
- 1977 - 1989 Ivan Roggen
- 1989 - 1995 André Degroeve (PS)

==== Flemish Brabant ====
#	Governor	Party	Office entered	Office left
1.	Lodewijk De Witte	SP.A	1995	2020
2.	Jan Spooren	N-VA	2020	present

==== Walloon Brabant ====
#	Governor	Party	Office entered	Office left
1.	Valmy Féaux	PS	1995	2000
2.	Emmanuel Hendrickx	PS	2000	2006
3.	Éttiene Hachez	PS	2006	2007
4.	Marie-José Laloy	PS	2007	2014
5.	Christophe Baes	PS	2014	2015
6.	Gilles Mahieu	PS	2015	-

=== East Flanders ===
#	Governor	Party	Office entered	Office left
1.	Pierre De Ryckere		1830	
2.	Werner de Lamberts-Cortenbach		1830	1834
3.	Charles Vilain XIIII		1834	1836
4.	Louis de Schiervel		1837	1843
5.	Léandre Desmaisières		1843	1848
6.	Edouard De Jaegher		1848	1871
7.	Emile de T'Serclaes De Wommersom		1871	1879
8.	Léon Verhaeghe de Naeyer		1879	1885
9.	Raymond de Kerchove d'Exaerde		1885	1919
10.	Maurice Lippens		1919	1921
11.	André de Kerchove de Denterghem		1921	1929
12.	Karel Weyler		1929	1935
13.	Jules Ingenbleek		1935	1938
14.	Louis Frederiq		1938	1939
15.	Maurice Van den Boogaerde		1939	1954
16.	Albert Mariën		1954	1963
17.	Roger De Kinder	BSP	1963	1984
18.	Herman Balthazar	SP/SP.A	1984	2004
19.	André Denys	Open VLD	2004	2013
20.	Jan Briers		2013	2018
21.	Didier Detollenaere	Open VLD	2018	2020
22.	Carina Van Cauter	Anders	2020	

=== Hainaut ===
#	Governor	Party	Office entered	Office left
1.	Ambroise de Puydt		1830	1834
2.	Jean-Baptiste Thorn		1836	1841
3.	Charles Liedts		1841	1845
4.	Édouard Mercier		1845	1847
5.	Augustin Dumon-Dumortier		1847	1848
6.	Adolphe de Vrière		1848	1849
7.	Louis Troye		1849	1870
8.	Joseph de Riquet de Caraman-Chimay		1870	1878
9.	Auguste Wanderpepen		1878	
10.	Oswald de Kerchove de Denterghem		1878	1884
11.	Auguste Vergote		1884	1885
12.	Joseph d'Ursel		1885	1889
13.	Charles d'Ursel		1889	1893
14.	Raoul du Sart de Bouland		1893	1908
15.	Maurice Damoiseaux		1908	1937
16.	Henri Van Mol		1937	1940
17.	Émile Cornez		1944	1967
18.	Emilien Vaes		1967	1983
19.	Michel Tromont		1983	2004
20.	Claude Durieux	PS	2004	2012
21.	Guy Bracaval		2013	2013
21.	Tommy Leclercq	PS	2013	present

=== Liège ===
#	Governor	Party	Office entered	Office left
1.	Etienne de Sauvage		1830	1831
2.	Jean-François Tielemans		1831	1832
3.	Charles van den Steen de Jehay		1832	1844
4.	Henri de Brouckère		1844	1846
5.	Edmond de la Coste		1846	1847
6.	Ferdinand de Macar		1847	1863
7.	Charles de Luesemans		1863	1882
8.	Léon Pety de Thozée		1882	1908
9.	Henry Delvaux de Fenffe		1908	1919
10.	Gaston Gregoire		1919	1927
11.	Henri Pirard		1927	1937
12.	Jules Mathieu		1937	1943
13.	Joseph Leclercq	PSB	1944	1953
14.	Pierre Clerdent	PRL	1953	1971
15.	Gilbert Mottard	PS	1972	1990
16.	Paul Bolland		1990	2004
17.	Michel Foret	MR	2004	2015
18.	Hervé Jamar	MR	2015	present

=== Limburg ===
#	Governor	Party	Office entered	Office left
1.	Frans de Loë Imstenraedt de Mheer		1830	1831
2.	Jean-François Hennequin		1831	1834
3.	Werner de Lamberts-Cortenbach		1834	1843
4.	Pierre de Schiervel		1843	1857
5.	Theodoor de T'Serclaes de Wommersom		1857	1871
6.	Pieter de Decker		1871	
7.	Joseph Bovy		1872	1879
8.	Adolphe Goupy de Beauvolers		1879	1894
9.	Henri de Pitteurs-Hiégaerts		1894	1914
10.	Vacant (World War I)		1914	1919
11.	Theodore de Renesse		1919	1927
12.	Hubert Verwilghen		1928	1940
13.	Gérard Romsée		1940	1941
14.	Jef Lysens		1941	1944
15.	Hubert Verwilghen		1944	1950
16.	Louis Roppe		1950	1978
17.	Harry Vandermeulen		1978	1995
18.	Hilde Houben-Bertrand	CVP/CD&V	1995	2005
19.	Steve Stevaert	SP.A	2005	2009
20.	Herman Reynders	SP.A	2009	2020
21.	Jos Lantmeeters	N-VA	2020	present

=== Luxembourg ===
#	Governor	Party	Office entered	Office left
1.	Jean-Baptiste Thorn		1830	1836
2.	Victorin de Steenhault		1936	1841
3.	Joseph de Riquet de Caraman et de Chimay		1841	1842
4.	Charles Vandamme		1862	1884
5.	Paul de Gerlache		1884	1891
6.	Édouard Orban de Xivry		1891	1901
7.	Emmanuel de Briey		1902	1932
8.	Fernand Van den Corput		1932	1940
9.	René Greindl		1940	1944
10.	Fernand Van den Corput		1944	1945
11.	Pierre Clerdent		1946	1953
12.	Maurice Brasseur		1965	1976
13.	Jacques Planchard		1976	1996
14.	Bernard Caprasse	CDH	1996	2016
15.	Oliver Schmitz		2016	present

=== Namur ===
#	Governor	Party	Office entered	Office left
1.	Goswin de Stassart		1830	1834
2.	Joseph Lebeau		1834	1840
3.	Edouard d'Huart		1840	1847
4.	Adolphe de Vrière		1847	1848
5.	Victor Pirson		1848	1851
6.	Charles de Baillet		1853	1875
7.	D. de Mevius		1876	1877
8.	Albert de Beauffort		1877	1881
9.	Léon Pety de Thozée		1881	1882
10.	Auguste Vergote		1882	1884
11.	Charles de Montpellier de Vedrin		1884	1914
12.	Pierre de Gaiffier d'Hestroy		1919	1937
13.	François Bovesse		1937	1944
14.	Robert Gruslin		1945	1968
15.	René Close	PS	1968	1977
16.	Pierre Falize	PS	1977	1980
17.	Emile Lacroix	PS	1980	1987
18.	Emile Wauthy	PSC	1987	1994
19.	Amand Dalem	PSC	1994	2007
20.	Denis Mathen	MR	2007	present

=== West Flanders ===
#	Governor	Party	Office entered	Office left
1.	Felix de Muelenaere	Catholic	1830	1831
1.	Felix de Muelenaere	Catholic	1832	1834
1.	Felix de Muelenaere	Catholic	1836	1849
2.	Adolphe de Vrière	Liberal	1849	1857
3.	Benoît Vrambout		1857	1877
4.	Léon Ruzette		1877	1878
5.	Theodore Heyvaert		1878	1883
6.	Guillaume De Brouwer		1883	1884
7.	Léon Ruzette		1884	1901
8.	Jean-Baptiste de Bethune		1901	
9.	Charles d'Ursel		1901	1903
10.	Jean-Baptiste de Bethune		1903	1907
11.	Albéric Ruzette		1907	1912
12.	Léon Janssens de Bisthoven		1912	1933
13.	Henri Baels		1933	1940
14.	Michel Bulckaert		1940	1944
15.	Pierre van Outryve d'Ydewalle		1944	1979
16.	Leo Vanackere	CVP	1979	
17.	Olivier Vanneste	CVP	1979	1997
18.	Paul Breyne	CVP/CD&V	1997	2012
19.	Carl Decaluwe	CD&V	2012	present

== National Bank of Belgium ==
- François-Philippe de Haussy (1850–1869)
- Eugène Prévinaire (1870–1877)
- André-Eugène Pirson (1877–1881)
- Alexandre Jamar (1882–1888)
- Eugène Anspach (1888–1890)
- Victor Van Hoegaerden (1891–1905)
- Théophile de Lantsheere (1905–1918)
- Leon Van der Rest (1918–1923)
- Fernand Hautain (1923–1926)
- Louis Franck (1926–1937)
- Georges Janssen (1938–1941)
- Albert Goffin (1941)
- Georges Theunis (1941–1944)
- Maurice Frère (1944–1957)
- Hubert Ansiaux (1957–1971)
- Robert Vandeputte (1971–1975)
- Cecil de Strycker (1975–1982)

#	Governor	Party	Office entered	Office left
	Jean Godeaux		1982	1989
	Alfons Verplaetse		1989	1999
	Guy Quaden	PS	1999	2011
	Luc Coene	Open VLD	2011	2015
	Jan Smets	CD&V	2015	2018
	Pierre Wunsch	MR	2019	Present
