= 1946 Belgian general election =

- 17 February 1946

All 202 seats in the Chamber of Representatives 102 seats needed for a majority
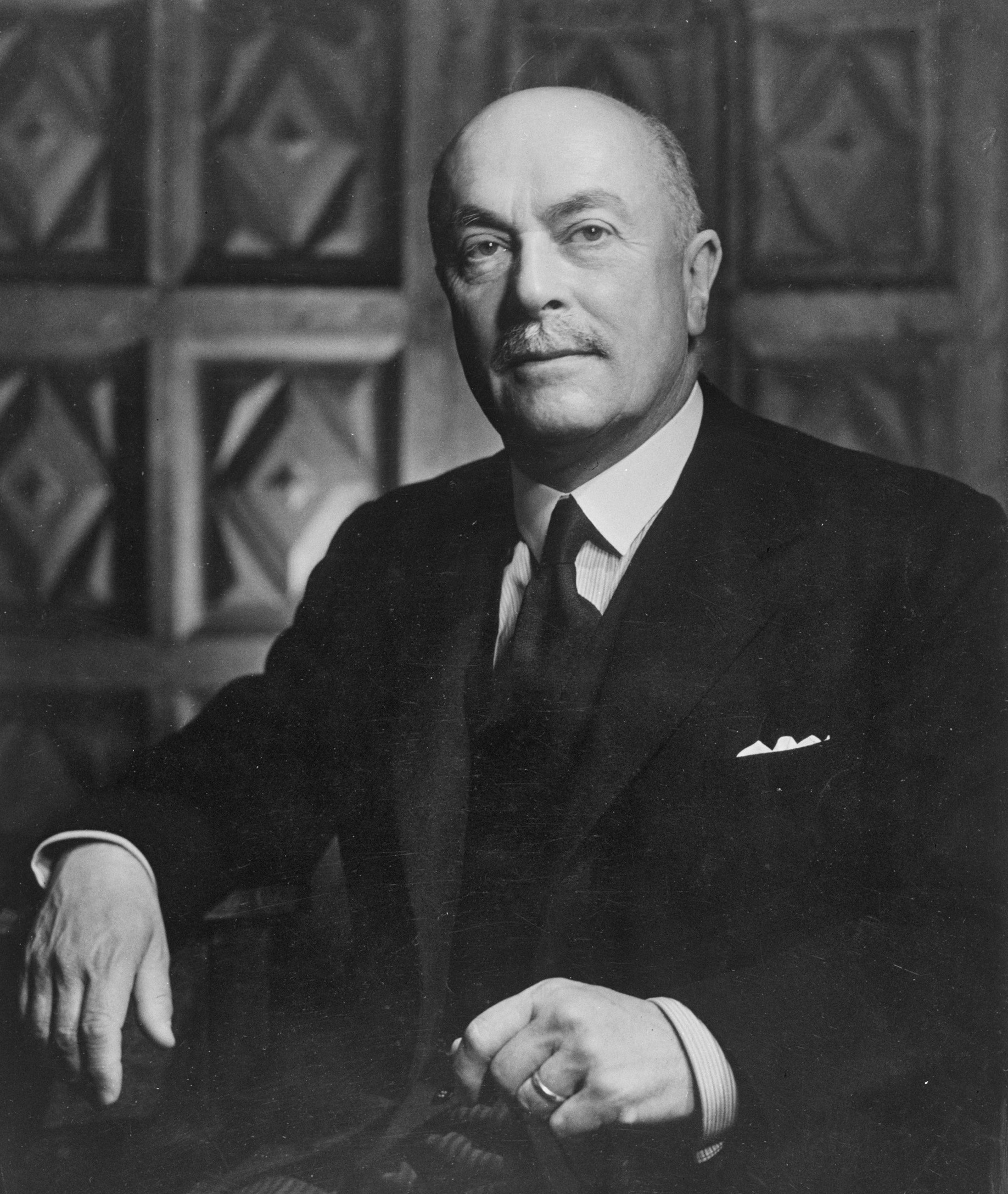

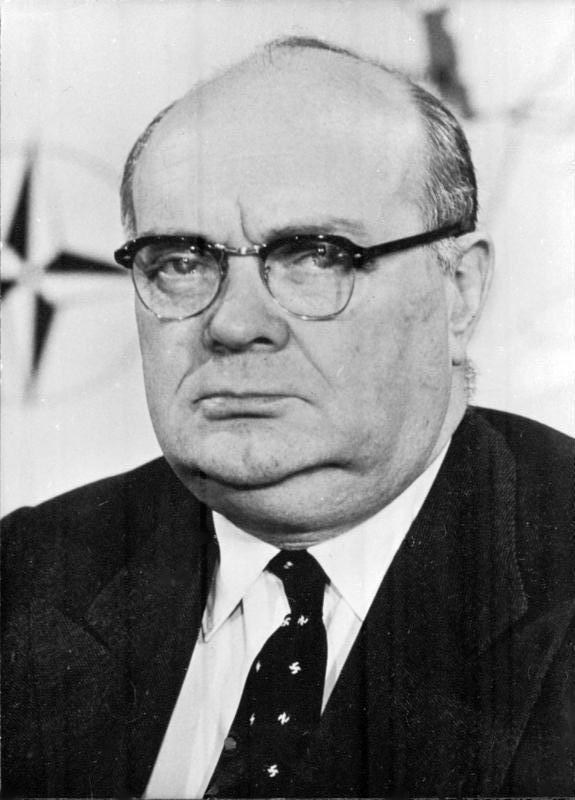

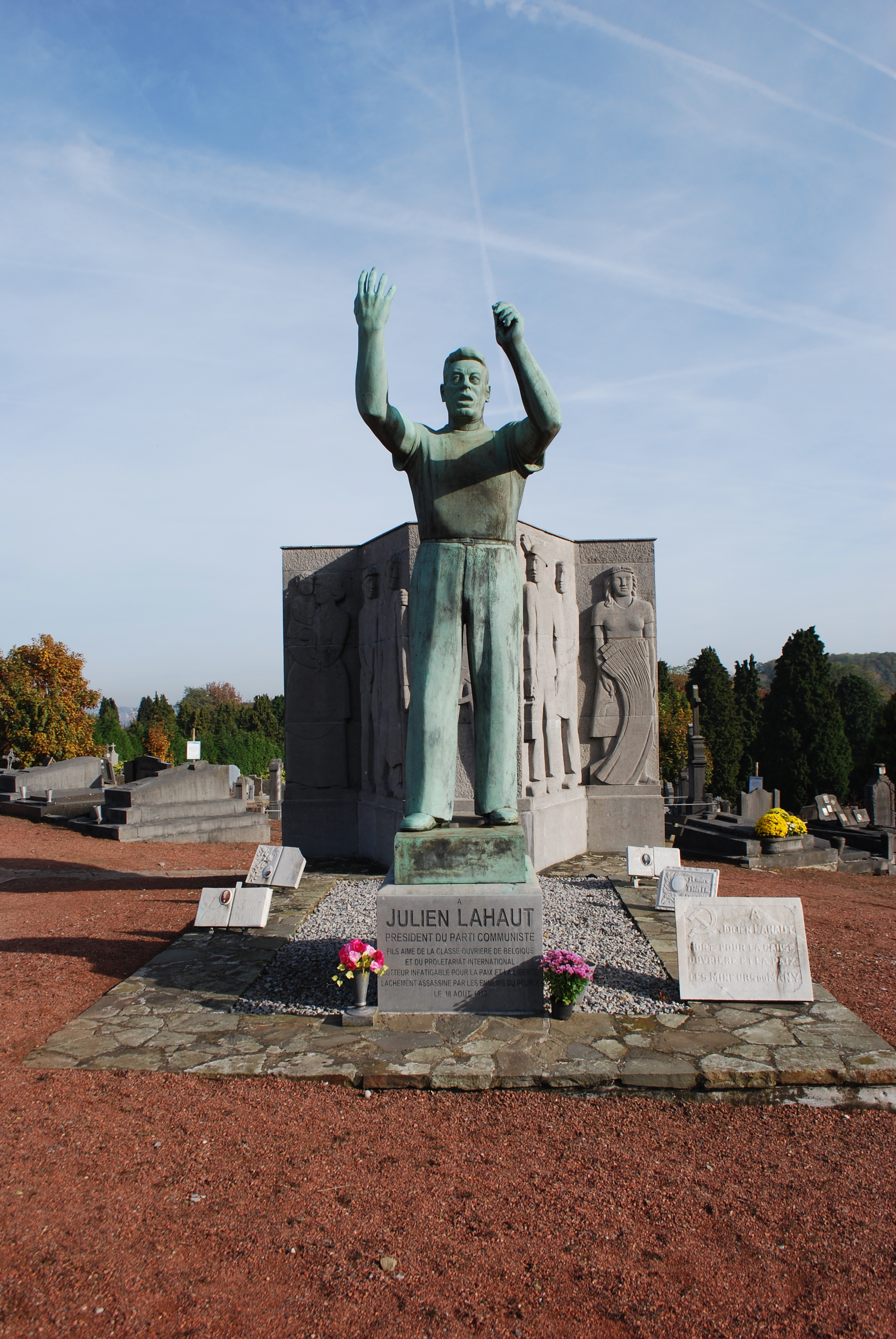

	First party	Second party	Third party
Leader	Hubert Pierlot	Paul-Henri Spaak	Julien Lahaut
Party	Christian Social	Socialist	Communist
Leader since	Candidate for PM?	Candidate for PM	1945
Last election	73 seats, 33.58%	64 seats, 29.44%	9 seats, 4.65%
Seats won	92	69	23
Seat change	▲19	▲5	▲14
Popular vote	1,006,293	746,738	300,099
Percentage	42.54%	31.57%	12.69%
Swing	▲8.96%	▲2.13%	▲8.04%
	Fourth party	Fifth party
Leader	Roger Motz	Pierre Clerdent; Antoine Delfosse
Party	Liberal	Democratic Union
Leader since	1945	1945
Last election	33 seats, 17.18%	New party
Seats won	17	1
Seat change	▼16	▲1
Popular vote	211,143	51,095
Percentage	8.93%	2.16%
Swing	▼8.25	▲2.16%
- Seats by constituency
Government before election
van Acker II
BSP/PSB-Lib-UDB-KPB/PCB
Government after election
Spaak II
BSP/PSB

General elections were held in Belgium on 17 February 1946. The result was a victory for the Christian Social Party, which won 92 of the 202 seats in the Chamber of Representatives and 51 of the 101 seats in the Senate. Voter turnout was 90.3%.

They were the first elections after the Second World War and saw fundamental changes among the political parties. The Flemish National Union, which held 17 seats prior to the war and collaborated with Nazi Germany during the war, was outlawed. The Catholic Party changed into the Christian Social Party while the Belgian Labour Party changed into the Belgian Socialist Party. The Liberal Party suffered major losses, while the Christian Social Party and the Communist Party made major gains.

Following the elections, Paul-Henri Spaak formed a Socialist minority government supported by the Communists. After he failed to win the confidence of the Christian Social and Liberal parties, outgoing PM Achille Van Acker formed a new government which included Socialists, Communists and Liberals.

== Results ==
=== Chamber of Deputies ===
Party	Votes	%	Seats
Christian Social Party	1,006,293	42.54	92
Belgian Socialist Party	746,738	31.57	69
Communist Party of Belgium	300,099	12.69	23
Liberal Party	211,143	8.93	17
Belgian Democratic Union	51,095	2.16	1
Liberal–Socialist Kartels	37,844	1.60	0
Union of Trades	3,360	0.14	0
FRENSSEN	2,480	0.10	0
Walloon Unity Party	1,774	0.07	0
Belgian People's Movement	865	0.04	0
Resistant	676	0.03	0
Middle Classes	274	0.01	0
Belgian Free Independents	212	0.01	0
Independents	2,785	0.12	0
Total	2,365,638	100.00	202
Valid votes	2,365,638	96.14	
Invalid/blank votes	94,971	3.86	
Total votes	2,460,609	100.00	
Registered voters/turnout	2,724,796	90.30	
Source: Belgian Elections

=== Senate ===
Party	Votes	%	Seats
Christian Social Party	999,264	42.74	51
Belgian Socialist Party	729,943	31.22	34
Communist Party of Belgium	300,655	12.86	11
Liberal Party	214,837	9.19	4
Belgian Democratic Union	48,441	2.07	0
Liberal–Socialist Kartels	33,732	1.44	1
Union of Trades	3,764	0.16	0
Demarrez	3,753	0.16	0
Independents	3,866	0.17	0
Total	2,338,255	100.00	101
Valid votes	2,338,255	95.63	
Invalid/blank votes	106,767	4.37	
Total votes	2,445,022	100.00	
Source: Belgian Elections
