= Governor of Limburg =

The governor of the Belgian province Limburg is the provincial head of government.

== Governors ==
Governors of Limburg (Belgium and the Netherlands):

- 1815–1828: Charles de Brouckere (1757–1830)
- 1828–1830: Maximilien de Beeckman (1781–1834)

Governors of Belgian Limburg (whole Limburg, Maastricht not included):

- 1830–1831: Frans Karel Anton de Loe (1789–1838)
- 1831–1834: Jean François Hennequin (1772–1846)
- 1834–1843: Werner de Lamberts Cortenbach (1775–1849)
- 1843–1857: Pierre Leonard Louise Marie de Schiervel (1783–1866)
- 1857–1871: Theodoor de T 'serclaes de Wommersom (1809–1880)
- 1871–1871: Pierre Jacques François de Decker (1812–1891)
- 1872–1879: Joseph Bovy (1810–1879)
- 1879–1894: Adolphe Goupy de Beauvolers (1825–1894)
- 1894–1914: Henri Theodore Jules de Pitteurs-Hiégaerts (1834–1917)
- 1914–1918: Vacant – First World War
- 1919–1927: Theodore de Renesse (1854–1927)
- 1928–1950: Hubert Verwilghen (1889–1955)
- 1940–1941: Gérard Romsée (1901–1976) (* ad interim)
- 1941–1944: Jozef Lysens (1896–1950)
- 1950–1978: Louis Roppe (1914–1982)
- 1978–1995: Harry Vandermeulen (1928– )
- 1995–2005: Hilde Houben-Bertrand (1940– )
- 2005–2009: Steve Stevaert (1954–2015)
- 2009–2020: Herman Reynders
- 2020– : Jos Lantmeeters
