= Belgian Democratic Union =

Belgian Democratic Union French: Union Démocratique Belge Dutch: Belgische Democratische Unie
- Leaders: Max Bastin, Pierre Clerdent
- Founded: 1944
- Dissolved: 1946
- Split from: Catholic Party
- Merged into: Belgian Socialist Party
- Headquarters: Brussels
- Ideology: Social democracy Christian democracy Christian left Belgian unionism
- Political position: Centre-left
- Colours: Fucsia

The Belgian Democratic Union (Union Démocratique Belge, UDB; Belgische Democratische Unie, BDU) was a short-lived centre-left political party in Belgium which existed from 1944 to 1946. Aimed at uniting left-leaning Christian Democrats with moderate socialists and others, the movement adhered to a programme which it described as "labourism" (travaillisme). It failed to achieve an electoral breakthrough in Belgium's first postwar elections in 1946 and collapsed shortly afterwards.

== History ==
=== Formation ===
The UDB was one of two post-war parties founded in Belgium appealing to Christian thought, the other being the Christian Social Party (PSC-CVP), heir to the prewar Catholic Party. The UDB's main founders were Pierre Clerdent and Antoine Delfosse and the party essentially originated in the French-speaking Christian trade unions, being unable to gain major supporters from its Flemish counterpart.

The UDB was essentially a "labourist" (travailliste) party which would now be placed on the centre-left which advocated the Catholic Church's disengagement from national politics (déconfessionnalisation) and an agenda based on progressivism (progressisme). It had ambitions to be a nationwide party, but was mainly restricted to Wallonia and the French-speakers in Brussels, making it short on influence in the capital's political circles. Its leaders came from the Belgian resistance and the other parties hoped that the UDB and CVP would compete against and weaken each other by splitting the Christian Democrat vote. When the PSC-CVP refused to participate in the second government of Achiel Van Acker (2 August 1945 - 9 January 1946), two UDB members of parliament joined it - Marcel Gregoire for Justice and Jacques Basyn for Defence. Franz De Voghel (with UDB sympathies) was minister of finance.

=== Fall ===
UDB hopes were high at the general elections on 17 February 1946, but these were disappointed, with the party only gaining 51,095 votes (mainly in Brussels) and only managed to elect one person to the Chamber of Representatives (Paul M. G. Lévy for the arrondissement of Nivelles, though he resigned after only a few weeks and was replaced by Werner Marchand). It was clear that the party had several leaders but no members. In 1946 it had 2,637 members - 380 in Flanders, 904 in Brabant (Brussels) and 1,353 in Wallonia. This marked its end.

Some of its leaders went over to the CVP, including Pierre Clerdent (governor of Luxembourg and Liège and later a liberal senator), Alfred Califice (frequently a minister for the CVP) and Antoine Delfosse (for whom this meant a switch back to the CVP). Lévy, Max Bastin and Jacques Basyn became independents.
