= Collectif contre les expulsions (CCLE) =

The Collectif contre les expulsions (CCLE) is an independent organization created in 1998 in Brussels to defend freedom of movement and to support illegal immigrants detained in immigrant detention centres managed by the Belgian Immigration Office. Almost 8,000 people awaiting expulsion or rejection orders are detained in such detention centres.

Giving priority to nonviolent resistance and civil disobedience, the CCLE does not assume a position "for" illegal immigrants but "with" them.

== Legislation ==
In Belgium, the General Directorate of the Immigration Office is charged with foreign policy. Fundamental rules are mentioned in the Law of 15 December 1980 on the access to the territory, stay, establishment, and return of foreigners and in a royal order of 8 October 1981. Article 77 of this law punishes "everyone who knowingly helps a foreigner […] illegally to enter or remain" with imprisonment from 8 days up to three months and a fine of from 1,700 up to 6,000 euros. According to the same law, this rule "will not apply if the aid or assistance to such foreigners was offered for primarily humanitarian reasons".

Existing legislation has been tightened with the Law of 13 April 1995 incorporating all the measures necessary for the Suppression of the Traffic in Persons and Child Pornography with the aim of introducing more serious punishments against organised crime.
