= Charles Vilain XIIII =

Belgian politician

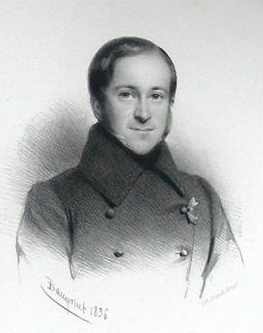
Portrait from 1838, made by Charles Baugniet

Viscount Charles Ghislain Guillaume Vilain XIIII (15 May 1803 – 16 November 1878) was a Belgian politician, serving as governor of East Flanders, Minister of Foreign Affairs and President of the Chamber of Representatives of Belgium.

== Early life ==
Charles Vilain XIIII was born in Brussels in 1803 as the eldest son of Count Philippe-Louis Vilain XIIII, mayor of Rupelmonde, and Baroness Sophie de Feltz. He was the eldest male descendant of one of the main branches of the ancient noble family Vilain XIIII. He studied at the Lyceum of Brussels, the Charlemagne college in Paris, and the Jesuit college in Saint-Acheul. He started studying law at the University of Liège in 1821, but dropped out of school and married Baroness Pauline de Billehé de Valensart (1800–1842) on 21 May 1822.

== Political career ==
In 1828, Charles Vilain XIIII became a member of the States-General of the Netherlands and joined the opposition against William I of the Netherlands, but influenced by the writings of Hugues Felicité Robert de Lamennais, he had more progressive ideas than his father and his uncle Charles-Hippolyte Vilain XIIII, both also members of the States-General.

In 1830, he was a member of the National Congress of Belgium, where he became the Secretary of the Central Bureau, which was responsible for drafting the new Constitution of Belgium. Charles Vilain XIIII read the Belgian Constitution at the Oath of the first king, Leopold I. In 1830, he was offered but refused the function of Governor of Limburg. He was elected to the Chamber of Representatives in 1831 for Sint-Niklaas, and reelected in 1832, 1833, 1834 and 1835.

Vilain XIIII was appointed Belgian Ambassador to the Holy See in 1832, and sent to the Vatican and some Italian kingdoms as a special emissary in 1832, a mission which was largely a failure, and which was responsible for Charles' move away from progressive ideas towards more reactionary and anti-democratic principles. On his return, he became governor of East Flanders in September 1834, succeeding Werner de Lamberts-Cortenbach; he held this position until the end of August 1836. At the end of 1835, he again became a special emissary to the Vatican and the Italian States; this mission lasted until 1839 and was a success. Due to his frequent absences, he didn't stand in the 1836 elections for MP.

After the end of his mission in Italy, he again was a candidate MP for Sint-Niklaas, and became the MP from 1839 until 1848. He was the vice-president of the Chamber of Representatives from 1843 until 1847. In 1848, he switched from Sint-Niklaas to Maaseik (where his family castle was located), and became MP for Maaseik from 1848 until his death in 1878. He was President of the Chamber between 1855 and 1858. He was mayor of Leut from 1842 until 1878. He was a candidate for Governor of Antwerp in 1844, but didn't get the position.

In 1855, he became Minister of Foreign Affairs in the Pierre de Decker government, until the end of that cabinet in 1857. From 1870 until 1875 he was again elected president of the Chamber of Representatives, and in 1875 he received the honorary title of Minister of State.

He was made a Knight in the Order of Leopold on 30 August 1835, and raised to Officer in the same order on 13 Mai 1843; he was also awarded the Iron Cross. Foreign decorations include the Knight Grand Cross of the Order of Saint Januarius in Sicily, Grand Cross of the Order of Saints Maurice and Lazarus in Italy, Grand Cross of the Imperial Order of the Medjidie in the Ottoman Empire, Grand Cross of the Order of the Immaculate Conception of Vila Viçosa in Portugal, Grand Cross of the Order of the White Eagle in Russian Poland, and Grand Cross of the Order of the Polar Star in Sweden.

== Personal life ==
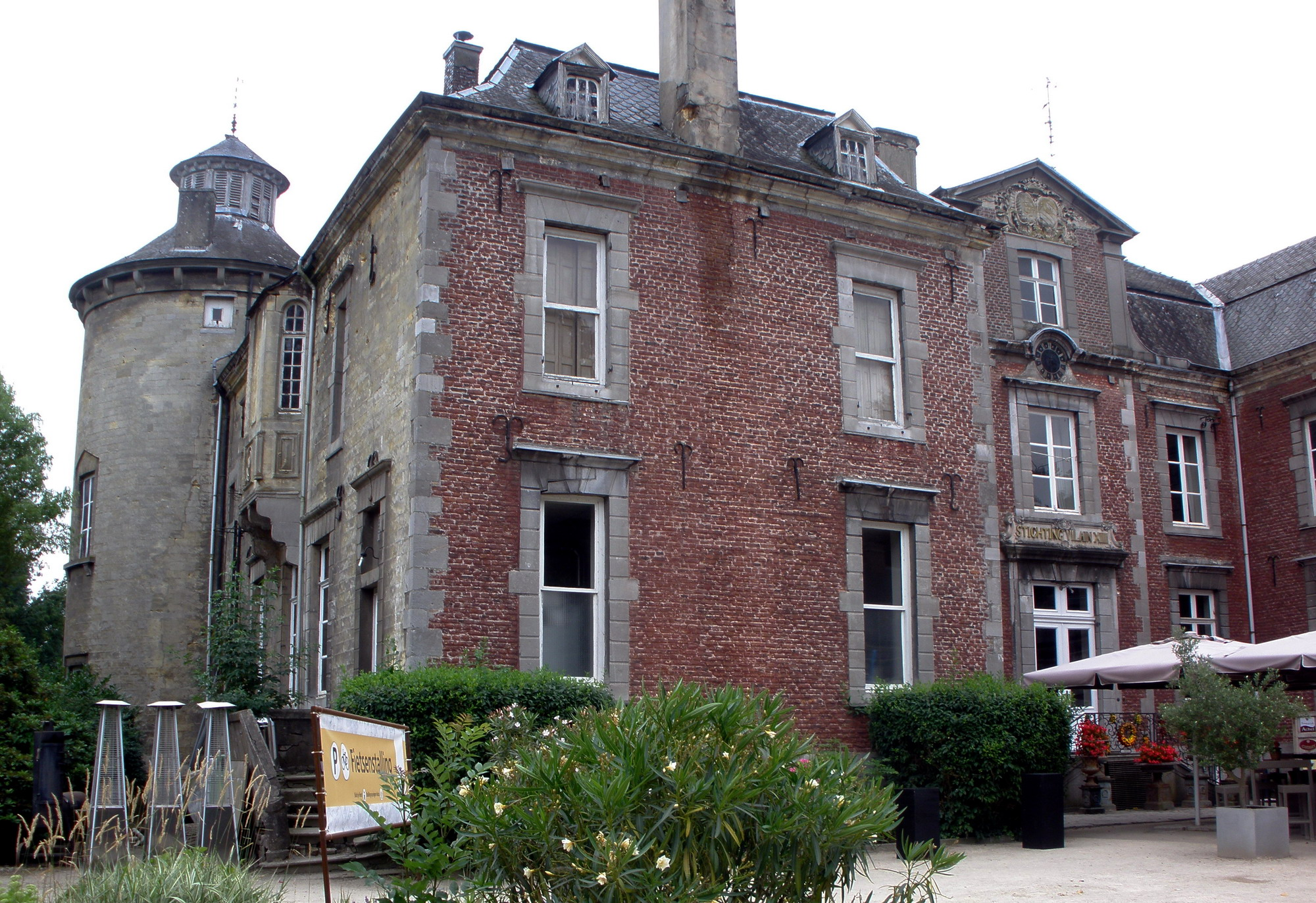
Castle of Leut, also known as Castle Vilain XIIII, home of Charles from 1822 until his death

Pauline de Billehé died on 9 April 1842. They had seven children, all daughters. The marriage gave him the castle of Leut, in Maasmechelen, which became the new family home until the last of his daughters died in 1922; it is now the retirement home Vilain XIIII. Not having a male heir, he was succeeded as head of the Vilain XIIII family by his younger brother Alfred Vilain XIIII.

Charles' oldest daughter Zoë Théodorine Ghislaine Vilain XIIII was born 1 November 1824; she married Baron Gustave de Marches à Guirsch on 16 April 1844. Her sister Marguerite Ghislaine Alfredine Antoinette was born 20 September 1829 and married Baron Jacques de Schiervel on 7 January 1852. Younger sister Georgine married Baron Louis de Brigode, and Philippine married in 1860 Baron Gustave de Villeneuve.

== Honours ==
National

- Belgium:
  - Minister of State, by Royal Decree.
  - Grand Cordon in the Order of Leopold.
  - Croix de Fer

Foreign

- Austrian Empire: Knight Grand Cross in the Order of Leopold
- Two Sicilies: Knight Grand Cross in the Illustrious Royal Order of Saint Januarius.
- Kingdom of Italy: Knight Grand Cross of the Order of Saints Maurice and Lazarus.
- Kingdom of Greece: : Knight Grand Cross of the Order of the Redeemer
- Sweden: Knight Grand Cross of the Order of the Polar Star.
- Holy See: Knight Grand Cross in the Order of Pope Pius IX.
- Russian Empire: Knight Grand Cross in the Order of the White Eagle
- Tuscany: Knight Grand Cross in the Order of Saint Joseph.
- Persia: Knight Grand Cross in the Order of the Lion and the Sun.
- Ottoman Empire: 1st Class, Order of the Medjidie.

== External Lists ==
- Charles Vilain XIIII in ODIS - Online Database for Intermediary Structures
