= Steve Stevaert =

Belgian politician (1954–2015)

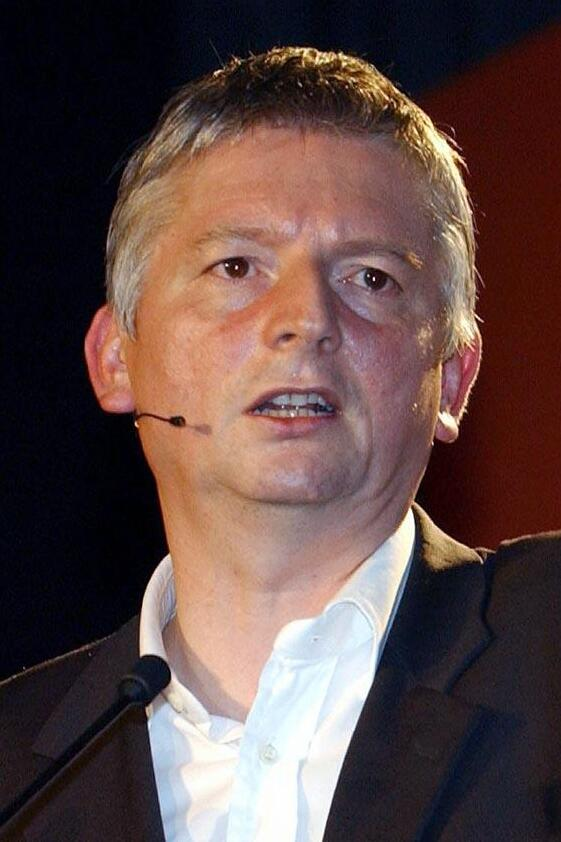

Governor of Limburg
- In office 2005–2009
- Preceded by: Hilde Houben-Bertrand
- Succeeded by: Herman Reynders

Personal details
- Born: Robert Stevaert; 12 April 1954 Rijkhoven, Belgium
- Died: 2 April 2015 (aged 60) Hasselt, Belgium
- Occupation: Politician

Steve Stevaert (Dutch: [stif ˈsteːvaːrt]; born Robert Stevaert [ˈrɔbərt ˈsteːvaːrt]; 12 April 1954 – 2 April 2015) was a Belgian politician of the Flemish Socialist Party: the SP.A.

== Biography ==
Stevaert was born on 12 April 1954, in Rijkhoven. After his studies at the "Hoger Rijksinstituut voor Toerisme, Hotelwezen en Voedingsbedrijven", Stevaert started as a bar owner in 1972.

Stevaert became politically active in 1982 under the wings of his mentor Willy Claes. Stevaert was elected to the Provincial Council of Limburg from 1985 to 1995. He became mayor and member of the city council of Hasselt in 1995. There he became famous for his policy of free public transport in 1997, which gave him his nickname "Steve Stunt".

Stevaert was also elected to the Flemish parliament in 1995 and was re-elected in 1999 and 2004. Stevaert served as Flemish minister of Public Works, Transport and Spatial planning from 1998 to 1999 and as Flemish minister of Mobility, Transport and Public Works from 1999 to 2003, when he resigned having become chairman of his party, succeeding Patrick Janssens.

He was chairman from 2003 until he resigned on 25 May 2005, having been appointed governor of the province Limburg, in which function he succeeded governor Hilde Houben-Bertrand. He became the 15th governor, and also the first 'socialist' governor of this province. Caroline Gennez succeeded him as temporary chairman, until Johan Vande Lanotte was officially elected as the new chairman in October 2005. On 9 June 2009, the day of the Flemish regional elections, Stevaert announced he would step down as governor. He was succeeded by his fellow socialist Herman Reynders.

Stevaert was given the honorary title of Minister of State on 26 January 2004.

== Death ==
In early April 2015, allegations of rape were made public in the Belgian media. Subsequently, on 2 April 2015, the public prosecutor of Hasselt confirmed that Stevaert had gone missing. His body was found that same day around 6:00 p.m. by divers in the Albert Canal near Hasselt.

Preceded by Hilde Houben-Bertrand	Governor of Limburg; 2005–2009	Succeeded by Herman Reynders
