= Royal order =

Official decree from a monarch

A royal order or royal decree is an official order or decision issued by a monarch, often having the force of law. It is a formal pronouncement, similar to an edict or executive order, that can cover various matters, from appointing officials to enacting laws.

== By country ==
=== Belgium ===
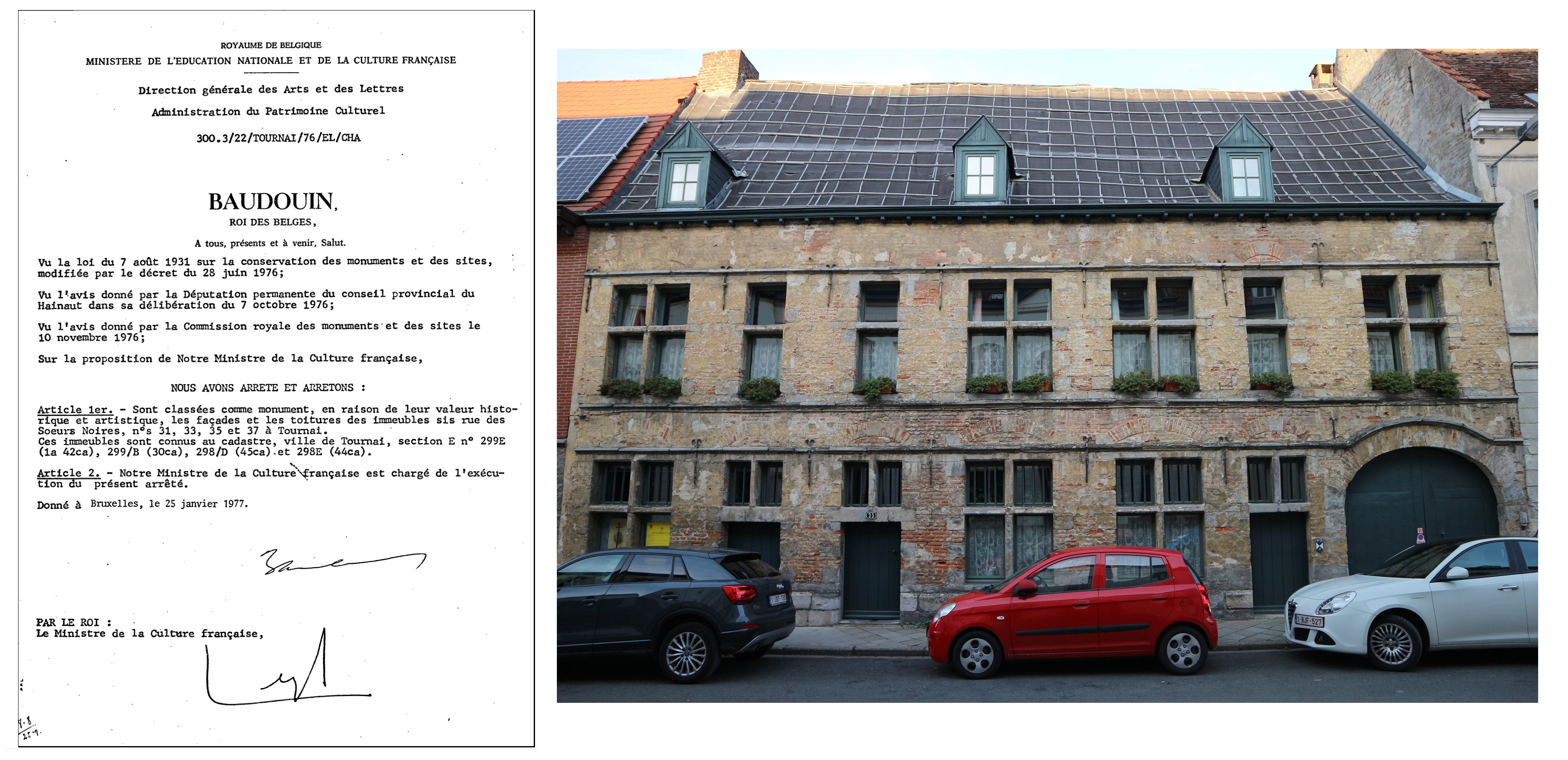
A royal decree signed by King Baudouin of Belgium regarding protection of immovable heritage in Tournai

In Belgium, a royal decree (RD) or royal order (Dutch: koninklijk besluit; French: arrêté royal; German: königlicher Erlass) is a federal government decree implementing legislation, or exercising powers the legislature has delegated to the crown as secondary legislation.

Under the Constitution of Belgium, the king cannot act alone. While the monarch is vested with executive power, it is exercised through his ministers. Hence, while Royal Orders are issued with the king's signature, they must be countersigned by a minister to be valid. In turn, the countersigning minister assumes political responsibility for the order. Its implementation usually begins on the date that it is published in the Belgian official journal.

=== Spain ===
In Spain, a royal order (Spanish: real orden) was a legal document with the force of law issued by the Spanish sovereign. They were issued by sovereigns from Philip II in the 1550s to Alfonso XIII, who ruled from 1886 to 1931. With the advent of the Second Spanish Republic in 1931, they ceased to be valid, and have been replaced by the decree-law.

== See also ==
- Primary and secondary legislation
- Executive order
- Order in Council
