= Edouard Osy de Zegwaart =

Belgian politician

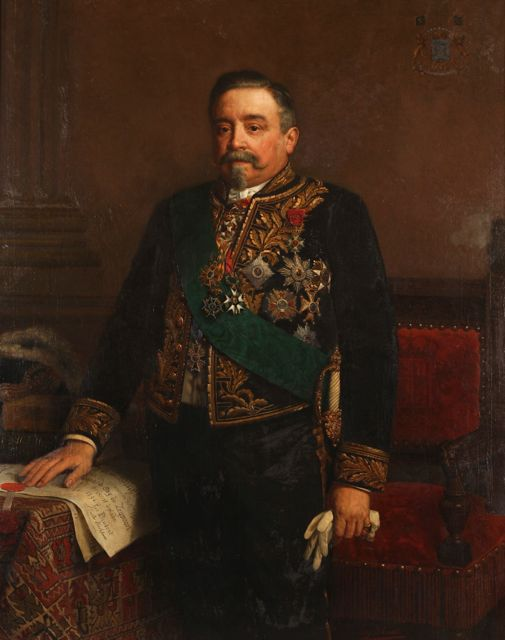
- Portrait of baron Edouard Osy de Zegwaart by Eugène Siberdt, 1890
- Born: Eduardus Josephus Franciscus de Paulo Osy de Zegwaart; 24 March 1832; Deurne, Belgium
- Died: 5 December 1900 (aged 68); Ekeren, Belgium
- Occupation: politician

Baron Eduardus (Edouard) Josephus Franciscus de Paulo Osy de Zegwaart (24 March 1832 – 5 December 1900) was a Belgian politician.

== Political career ==
Edouard Osy de Zegwaart was a member of the provincial council for the canton of Antwerp from 5 July 1864 until 22 May 1876. He was a senator in the Belgian Senate from 1877 until 1878 and a member of the Belgian Chamber of Representatives from 1880 until 1889. In 1888 he was a founding member of the Antwerp section of the Belgian Anti-Slavery Society.

Osy de Zegwaart was governor of the province of Antwerp from 26 January 1889 until his death on 5 December 1900. This made him president of the provincial committee of the Commission Royale des Monuments, in which he took an active interest.

He died at home, in Hoogboom Castle.

| Preceded by Charles du Bois de Vroylande | Governor of Antwerp; 1889 – 1900 | Succeeded by Fredegand Cogels |
