= Jan Teichmann =

Belgian engineer and politician

- Born: Jean Théodore Frédéric Teichmann; 3 August 1788; Venlo, Dutch Republic
- Died: 4 June 1867 (aged 78); Antwerp, Belgium
- Occupations: politician, engineer

Jean (Jan) Théodore Frédéric Teichmann (3 August 1788 – 4 June 1867) was a Belgian engineer and politician. He was governor ad interim of the province of Antwerp from 11 October 1833 until 3 August 1834 and governor from 10 November 1845 until 4 April 1862.

== Political career ==
Jan Teichmann was ad interim Belgian minister of Interior in 1831. He was a member of the Belgian Parliament from 1832 until 1835 and a Senator in the Belgian Senate from 1847 until 1848.

== Sources ==
- Steve Heylen, Bart De Nil, Bart D’hondt, Sophie Gyselinck, Hanne Van Herck en Donald Weber, Geschiedenis van de provincie Antwerpen. Een politieke biografie, Antwerpen, Provinciebestuur Antwerpen, 2005, Vol. 2 p. 172

Preceded by Jules Malou	Governor of Antwerp; 1845 – 1862	Succeeded by Edouard Pycke
