= Fredegand Cogels =

Belgian politician (1850–1932)

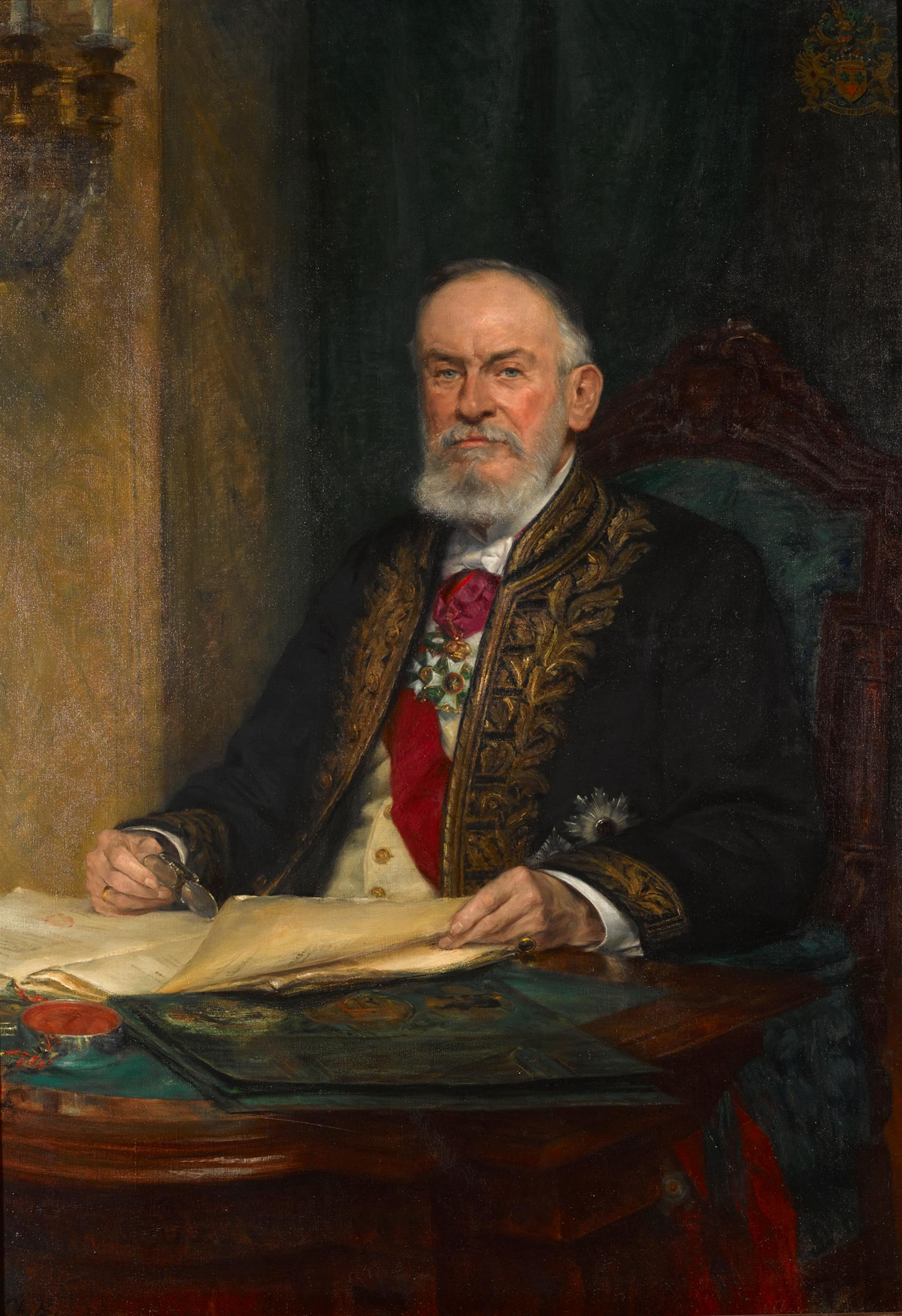
- Born: Fredegandus Patricius Josephus Maria Cogels; 14 April 1850; Antwerp, Belgium
- Died: 17 February 1932 (aged 81); Antwerp, Belgium
- Occupation: politician

Baron Fredegandus (Fredegand) Patricius Josephus Maria Cogels (14 April 1850 – 17 February 1932) was a Belgian politician and a member of the Meeting party. He was governor of the province of Antwerp from 16 December 1900 until 28 May 1907 and for a short while after World War I in 1918.

== Political career ==
Fredegand Cogels was senator in the Belgian Senate from 1892 until 1900 and again from 1918 until 1920.

== Sources ==
- Steve Heylen, Bart De Nil, Bart D’hondt, Sophie Gyselinck, Hanne Van Herck en Donald Weber, Geschiedenis van de provincie Antwerpen. Een politieke biografie, Antwerpen, Provinciebestuur Antwerpen, 2005, Vol. 2 p. 33

Preceded by Edouard Osy de Zegwaart	Governor of Antwerp; 1900–1907	Succeeded by Louis de Brouchoven de Bergeyck
