= Edouard Pycke =

Belgian liberal politician

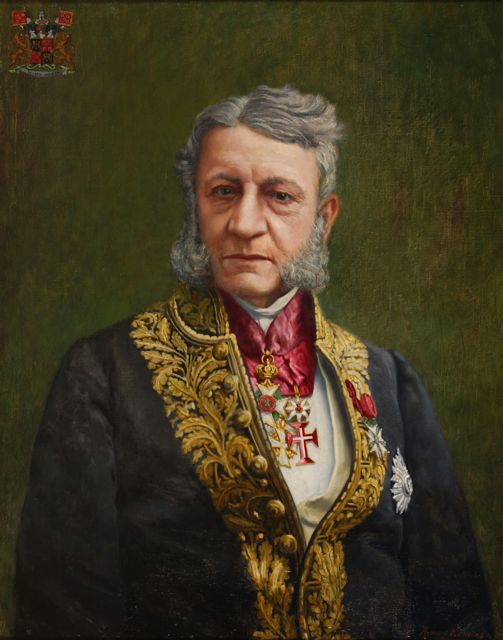
- Born: Jean Joseph Edouard Pycke d'Ideghem; 11 December 1807; Brussels
- Died: 27 April 1892 (aged 84); Mechelen
- Occupation: politician

Baron Jean Joseph Edouard Pycke d'Ideghem (11 December 1807 – 27 April 1892) was a Belgian liberal politician. He was governor of the province of Antwerp from 5 April 1862 until 23 March 1887.

== Political career ==
Edouard Pycke was a member of the Antwerp provincial council for the Canton Mechelen from 5 July 1842 until 25 May 1846 and from 18 July 1848 until 5 April 1846. He was a deputy to the provincial council from 4 August 1848 until 5 April 1862.

Preceded by Jan Teichmann	Governor of Antwerp; 1862–1887	Succeeded by Charles du Bois de Vroylande
