= List of protected heritage sites in Tournai =

This table shows an overview of the protected heritage sites in the Walloon city of Tournai listed as part of Belgium's national heritage.

Object	Year/architect	Town/section	Address	Coordinates	Number^{?}	Image
Notre Dame Cathedral ^{(nl)} ^{(fr)}		Tournai	Tournai	50.606520°N 3.388884°E	57081-CLT-0002-01 Info	Onze-Lieve-Vrouwekathedraal More images
Church of Saint-Brice ^{(nl)} ^{(fr)}		Tournai	Tournai	50.608147°N 3.394945°E	57081-CLT-0005-01 Info	Kerk Saint-Brice More images
Church of Saint-Jacques ^{(nl)} ^{(fr)}		Tournai	Tournai	50.608885°N 3.384661°E	57081-CLT-0006-01 Info	Kerk Saint-Jacques More images
Old church of Croisiers ^{(nl)} ^{(fr)}		Tournai	rue des Croisiers, Tournai	50.605648°N 3.400699°E	57081-CLT-0007-01 Info	Oude kerk van Croisiers
Chapel of Saint-Lazare, formerly the chapel of the "Leproserie du Val d'Orcq" ^{(nl)} ^{(fr)}		Tournai	chaussée de Lille, Tournai	50.604589°N 3.370524°E	57081-CLT-0008-01 Info	Kapel Saint-Lazare, eerder de kapel Léproserie du Val d'Orcq
Church of Saint-Nicolas ^{(nl)} ^{(fr)}		Tournai		50.612015°N 3.389260°E	57081-CLT-0009-01 Info	Kerk Saint-Nicolas
Chapel of the Athénée Royal ^{(nl)} ^{(fr)}		Tournai	rue de Quesnoy, Tournai	50.609348°N 3.396752°E	57081-CLT-0010-01 Info	Kapel van het Athénée Royal
Church of Saint Quentin ^{(nl)} ^{(fr)}		Tournai	Tournai	50.606714°N 3.385063°E	57081-CLT-0011-01 Info	Kerk Saint Quentin More images
Église Saint-Piat ^{(nl)} ^{(fr)}		Tournai	Tournai	50.604710°N 3.392458°E	57081-CLT-0012-01 Info	Église Saint-Piat More images
Tower and portico of the church of Sainte-Marguerite ^{(nl)} ^{(fr)}		Tournai		50.606360°N 3.381383°E	57081-CLT-0013-01 Info	Toren en portiek van de kerk Sainte-Marguerite
Tower of the church of Saint-Jean ^{(nl)} ^{(fr)}		Tournai	Tournai	50.605594°N 3.399196°E	57081-CLT-0014-01 Info	Toren van de kerk Saint-Jean
church of Sainte-Marie-Madeleine ^{(nl)} ^{(fr)}		Tournai	Tournai	50.611390°N 3.382481°E	57081-CLT-0015-01 Info	Kerk Sainte-Marie-Madeleine
Maison de fondations ^{(nl)} ^{(fr)}		Tournai	rue de Marvis n°29, Tournai	50.607171°N 3.400086°E	57081-CLT-0016-01 Info	Huis van fondations
Ensemble of the towers, curtain walls, gardens, and remnants of the twelfth century enceinte ^{(nl)} ^{(fr)}		Tournai	Tournai	50.601838°N 3.400074°E	57081-CLT-0025-01 Info	Ensemble van de torens, muren van courtine, tuinen, plantages en restanten van de muren van de twaalfde eeuw
Belfry of Tournai ^{(nl)} ^{(fr)}		Tournai		50.605757°N 3.388031°E	57081-CLT-0034-01 Info	Belfort van Doornik More images
Public Library, former Hôtel des Anciens Prêtres ^{(nl)} ^{(fr)}		Tournai	Place de l'Eveché, Tournai	50.607162°N 3.388228°E	57081-CLT-0035-01 Info	Openbare bibliotheek, voormalig Hôtel des Anciens Prêtres
Parts of the convent of Soeurs Noires ^{(nl)} ^{(fr)}		Tournai	rue de l'Hôpital Notre-Dame n°13, Tournai	50.607906°N 3.389849°E	57081-CLT-0037-01 Info	Delen van het klooster van Soeurs Noires
Building: Academy of Fine Arts and Decorative Arts ^{(nl)} ^{(fr)}		Tournai	rue de l'Hopital Notre-Dame n°14, Tournai	50.607748°N 3.390457°E	57081-CLT-0038-01 Info	Gebouw: Academie voor Schone Kunsten en Decoratieve Kunsten
Old Bank van Lening and the tower (now archaeological museum) ^{(nl)} ^{(fr)}		Tournai	rue des Carmes n°8, Tournai	50.607925°N 3.383366°E	57081-CLT-0039-01 Info	Oude Mont-de-Piété en de toren (momenteel archeologisch museum) More images
Tower called "Tour Henry VIII" ^{(nl)} ^{(fr)}		Tournai	rue du Rempart, tegenwoordig rue du Château n°30, Tournai	50.612327°N 3.392075°E	57081-CLT-0040-01 Info	Toren genaamd "Tour Henri VIII"
Part of the two groups of towers of the ramparts from the 13th century ^{(nl)} ^{(fr)}		Tournai	Tournai	50.602147°N 3.401115°E	57081-CLT-0041-01 Info	Deel van de twee groepen van torens van de omwalling uit de 13e eeuw
Old cloth hall "Halle-aux-Draps", now a museum ^{(nl)} ^{(fr)}		Tournai		50.606010°N 3.386140°E	57081-CLT-0043-01 Info	Oude Halle-aux-Draps, tegenwoordig museum
Roman house ^{(nl)} ^{(fr)}		Tournai	rue Barre-Saint-Brice n°10, Tournai	50.608092°N 3.394163°E	57081-CLT-0046-01 Info	Romaans huis
Roman house, now Protestant temple (facade) ^{(nl)} ^{(fr)}		Tournai	rue Barre-Saint-Brice n°12-14, Tournai	50.608188°N 3.394180°E	57081-CLT-0047-01 Info	Romaans huis, tegenwoordig protestantse tempel (gevel) More images
House ^{(nl)} ^{(fr)}		Tournai	rue des Jésuites n°14	50.604255°N 3.391714°E	57081-CLT-0048-01 Info	Huis
House ^{(nl)} ^{(fr)}		Tournai	rue des Jésuites n°12, Tournai	50.604293°N 3.391757°E	57081-CLT-0049-01 Info	Huis
Tower Saint-Georges ^{(nl)} ^{(fr)}		Tournai	rue Saint-Georges n°4/6, Tournai	50.605070°N 3.385421°E	57081-CLT-0054-01 Info	Toren Saint-Georges
Swan Tower ^{(nl)} ^{(fr)}		Tournai	rue des Fossés n°19, Tournai	50.608829°N 3.387648°E	57081-CLT-0055-01 Info	Toren
House facade ^{(nl)} ^{(fr)}		Tournai	rue des Jésuites n°s 14 b-16	50.604180°N 3.391666°E	57081-CLT-0056-01 Info	Huis: gevel More images
Building called "Hôtel Boucher" ^{(nl)} ^{(fr)}		Tournai	Saint-Brice n°44, Tournai	50.608030°N 3.398025°E	57081-CLT-0060-01 Info	Gebouw genaamd "Hôtel Boucher"
Tower of Fort Rouge ^{(nl)} ^{(fr)}		Tournai	Tournai	50.607379°N 3.384832°E	57081-CLT-0062-01 Info	Toren van Fort rouge
Facades, roofs, cladding of the barracks Septfontaines ^{(nl)} ^{(fr)}		Tournai	Tournai	50.611095°N 3.380133°E	57081-CLT-0064-01 Info	Gevels, daken, bekleding van de kazerne Sept Fontaines
Concert Hall and the ensemble of the hall and the buildings in the block bounded by rue Saint-Martin, rue des Primetiers and rue du Parc ^{(nl)} ^{(fr)}		Tournai	Tournai	50.605022°N 3.388154°E	57081-CLT-0068-01 Info	Concertzaal en het ensemble van de zaal en de gebouwen in het blok dat wordt begrensd door rue Saint-Martin, rue des Primetiers en rue du Parc
Drève de Maire, a width of 70 meters between the rows, down in a central strip of 20 meters wide part in the public domain of the state and two lateral bands of 25 m wide section of the public domain ^{(nl)} ^{(fr)}		Tournai	Tournai	50.620401°N 3.369232°E	57081-CLT-0069-01 Info	Drève de Maire: een breedte van 70 meter tussen de rijen, naar beneden in een centrale strook van 20 meter breed deel in het publieke domein van de staat en twee laterale banden van 25 m breed deel van het publieke domein
Facade in the style of Louis 15th ^{(nl)} ^{(fr)}		Tournai	rue Saint-Jacques n°17, Tournai	50.609307°N 3.384634°E	57081-CLT-0070-01 Info	Gevel in stijl van Louis 15e
Main Facade of the chapel and hospice of the Soeurs de Charité, former seminary ^{(nl)} ^{(fr)}		Tournai	Tournai	50.608723°N 3.399204°E	57081-CLT-0071-01 Info	Hoofdgevel en kapel van de hospice van de Soeurs de Charité, voormalige seminarie
Facades and roofs of the right part of the old seminary of Choiseul ^{(nl)} ^{(fr)}		Tournai	Tournai	50.608635°N 3.399831°E	57081-CLT-0073-01 Info	Gevels en daken van het rechter deel van de oude seminarie van Choiseul
Front facade and roof of the building ^{(nl)} ^{(fr)}		Tournai	rue de la Tête d'Or n° 7, Tournai	50.605687°N 3.390708°E	57081-CLT-0075-01 Info	Gevel en voorzijde dak van het gebouw
Facades and roofs of buildings Gorin ^{(nl)} ^{(fr)}		Tournai	côté place Reine Astrid en côté Parc de l'Hôtel de Ville, Tournai	50.604209°N 3.388391°E	57081-CLT-0077-01 Info	Gevels en daken van gebouw Gorin
Facades and roofs of the building ^{(nl)} ^{(fr)}		Tournai	rue du Marvis n°35 en 37, Tournai	50.607171°N 3.400186°E	57081-CLT-0078-01 Info	Gevels en daken van het gebouw
Building ^{(nl)} ^{(fr)}		Tournai	rue de la Madeleine n°2, Tournai	50.610026°N 3.382604°E	57081-CLT-0079-01 Info	Gebouw
Facades and roofs of the building ^{(nl)} ^{(fr)}		Tournai	rue des Soeurs Noires n°31, Tournai	50.609518°N 3.382501°E	57081-CLT-0081-01 Info	Gevels en daken van het gebouw
Facades and roofs of the building ^{(nl)} ^{(fr)}		Tournai	rue du Floc à Brebis n°13, Tournai	50.609959°N 3.382145°E	57081-CLT-0082-01 Info	Gevels en daken van het gebouw
Facades and roofs of the building ^{(nl)} ^{(fr)}		Tournai	rue Saint-Jacques n°22	50.609789°N 3.382873°E	57081-CLT-0083-01 Info	Gevels en daken van het gebouw
Facades and roofs of the Hôtel du Prince de la Tour d'Auvergne ^{(nl)} ^{(fr)}		Tournai	Place de Lille n°4, Tournai	50.607019°N 3.381873°E	57081-CLT-0085-01 Info	Gevels en daken van het Hôtel du Prince de la Tour d'Auvergne
Facades and roofs of the building ^{(nl)} ^{(fr)}		Tournai	rue des Puits l'Eau n° 23, Tournai	50.606156°N 3.391837°E	57081-CLT-0086-01 Info	Gevels en daken van het gebouw More images
"Maison des Six Filles" ^{(nl)} ^{(fr)}		Tournai	rue des Six Filles, in de wijk Saint-Jean, Tournai	50.605793°N 3.399474°E	57081-CLT-0087-01 Info	"Maison des Six Filles"
Facades and roofs of the building at the corner of Clovis Place and Rue Saint-Brice-Barre ^{(nl)} ^{(fr)}		Tournai	Place Clovis n°12, Tournai	50.608252°N 3.394365°E	57081-CLT-0089-01 Info	Gevels en daken van het gebouw op de hoek van Place Clovis en rue Barre-Saint-Brice
Town Hall and its entrance on the rue Saint-Martin ^{(nl)} ^{(fr)}		Tournai	rue Saint-Martin	50.602960°N 3.386842°E	57081-CLT-0091-01 Info	Raadhuis en diens entree aan de weg rue Saint-Martin
Ensemble of the town hall and the municipal park ^{(nl)} ^{(fr)}		Tournai	Tournai	50.603684°N 3.386005°E	57081-CLT-0092-01 Info	Ensemble van het raadhuis en het sectionlijk park More images
Museum of Fine Arts "Musée des Beaux-Arts de l'Enclos Saint-Martin" ^{(nl)} ^{(fr)}		Tournai		50.602547°N 3.385462°E	57081-CLT-0093-01 Info	Museum van Schone Kunsten van Enclos Saint-Martin
Tower from the 15th century church of Saint-Pierre ^{(nl)} ^{(fr)}		Tournai	Béclers	50.621486°N 3.504073°E	57081-CLT-0096-01 Info	Toren uit de 15e eeuw van de kerk Saint-Pierre
Choir and sacristy of the church Saint-Amand ^{(nl)} ^{(fr)}		Tournai	Ere	50.582116°N 3.367110°E	57081-CLT-0098-01 Info	Koor en sacristie van de kerk Saint-Amand
Stone cross called "Croix Notre-Dame" ^{(nl)} ^{(fr)}		Tournai	Froidmont	50.585584°N 3.343226°E	57081-CLT-0099-01 Info	Stenen kruis genaamd "Croix Notre-Dame"
Ensemble of the castle of Beauregard, the park and tourist center consisting of the church, the lane of lime trees, an old water ponds and the surrounding areas ^{(nl)} ^{(fr)}		Tournai	Froyennes	50.619562°N 3.353450°E	57081-CLT-0101-01 Info	Ensemble van het kasteel van Beauregard, het park en toeristisch centrum bestaand uit de kerk, de dreef met lindebomen, oude watermolen, de vijvers en de omliggende terreinen More images
Chapel Notre-Dame de la Tombe ^{(nl)} ^{(fr)}		Tournai	Kain	50.627925°N 3.389713°E	57081-CLT-0102-01 Info	Kapel Notre-Dame de la Tombe
Ensemble of the chapel Notre-Dame de la Paix and the two neighboring lime trees ^{(nl)} ^{(fr)}		Tournai	Orcq	50.604287°N 3.352732°E	57081-CLT-0103-01 Info	Ensemble van de kapel Notre-Dame de la Paix en de twee omringende lindebomen
Ensemble of the Grand-Place, with a 300-year-old lime tree ^{(nl)} ^{(fr)}		Tournai	Saint-Maur	50.570913°N 3.388617°E	57081-CLT-0105-01 Info	Ensemble van de Grand-Place, met de driehonderdjarige lindeboom
Castle Templeuve ^{(nl)} ^{(fr)}		Tournai	Templeuve	50.644697°N 3.284248°E	57081-CLT-0108-01 Info	Kasteel van Templeuve
Ruins of the old castle, called "Château de Jules Cesar" ^{(nl)} ^{(fr)}		Tournai	Vaulx-lez-Tournai	50.589470°N 3.427430°E	57081-CLT-0110-01 Info	Ruïnes van het oude kasteel, genaamd "Château de Jules César" More images
Church of Saint-Pierre: main facade and nave with its columns and arches from the 14th century and the carillon ^{(nl)} ^{(fr)}		Tournai	Vezon	50.568943°N 3.500821°E	57081-CLT-0111-01 Info	Kerk Saint-Pierre: hoofdgevel en middenschip met diens zuilen en arcaden uit de 14e eeuw en het carillon
House facades, roofs and structures in wood, upholstery, ^{(nl)} ^{(fr)}		Tournai	rue des Corriers 44, Tournai	50.610355°N 3.384664°E	57081-CLT-0114-01 Info	Huis: gevels, daken en structuren in hout, bekleding,
House: walls and roofs ^{(nl)} ^{(fr)}		Tournai	rue des Carliers n°20, Tournai	50.605643°N 3.392917°E	57081-CLT-0115-01 Info	Huis: gevels en daken
House: walls and roofs ^{(nl)} ^{(fr)}		Tournai	rue des Carliers n°24, Tournai	50.605519°N 3.392787°E	57081-CLT-0116-01 Info	Huis: gevels en daken
House: walls and roofs ^{(nl)} ^{(fr)}		Tournai	rue Haigne n°17, Tournai	50.606518°N 3.396580°E	57081-CLT-0118-01 Info	
the entire building including windows and cladding of the house ^{(nl)} ^{(fr)}		Tournai	rue Cambron n°s 29-31-33, Tournai	50.607309°N 3.394992°E	57081-CLT-0119-01 Info	het totale gebouw waaronder kozijnen en bekleding van het huis
Rear and roof of the building ^{(nl)} ^{(fr)}		Tournai	rue Saint-Martin n° 24, Tournai	50.604674°N 3.387270°E	57081-CLT-0120-01 Info	Achtergevel en dak van het gebouw
Garden of the building Gorin ^{(nl)} ^{(fr)}		Tournai	Tournai	50.604072°N 3.388415°E	57081-CLT-0121-01 Info	Tuin van het gebouw Gorin
Facades and roofs of the hotel Duquesne, and the ensemble of the building and its garden ^{(nl)} ^{(fr)}		Tournai	rue Saint-Martin 28, Tournai	50.604307°N 3.387410°E	57081-CLT-0122-01 Info	Gevels en daken van het hotel Duquesne, en het ensemble van het gebouw en diens tuin
Limekiln ^{(nl)} ^{(fr)}		Tournai	rue de la Lys, Tournai	50.598885°N 3.408092°E	57081-CLT-0123-01 Info	Kalkoven
Facades and roofs of the building ^{(nl)} ^{(fr)}		Tournai	rue de l'Arbalète n°9, Tournai	50.607907°N 3.389387°E	57081-CLT-0124-01 Info	Gevels en daken van het gebouw
Facades and roofs of all buildings (including the old bakery) of Castle Baudignies and the ensemble of the castle and its surroundings ^{(nl)} ^{(fr)}		Tournai		50.644241°N 3.438366°E	57081-CLT-0125-01 Info	Gevels en daken van alle gebouwen (inclusief de oude bakkerij) van kasteel van Baudignies en het ensemble van het kasteel en zijn omgeving
Pavilion in the Imperial Style ^{(nl)} ^{(fr)}		Tournai	rue des Jésuites n°55, Tournai	50.603286°N 3.388784°E	57081-CLT-0126-01 Info	Paviljoen in Keizersstijl
House: walls and roofs ^{(nl)} ^{(fr)}		Tournai	place de Lille, N°16	50.606428°N 3.380848°E	57081-CLT-0127-01 Info	Huis: gevels en daken
Building: walls and roofs, and the ensemble of the building and garden ^{(nl)} ^{(fr)}		Tournai	rue Saint Martin n°47, Tournai	50.604878°N 3.386275°E	57081-CLT-0129-01 Info	Gebouw: gevels en daken, en het ensemble van het gebouw en de tuin
Buildings, facades, cladding and roofing ^{(nl)} ^{(fr)}		Tournai	quai Notre-Dame n°30, Tournai	50.608567°N 3.390189°E	57081-CLT-0131-01 Info	Gebouwen: gevels, bekleding en daken
Building: facades, cladding and roofing ^{(nl)} ^{(fr)}		Tournai	quai Notre-Dame n°9, Tournai	50.609380°N 3.388737°E	57081-CLT-0132-01 Info	Gebouw: gevels, bekleding en daken
Buildings, facades, cladding and roofing ^{(nl)} ^{(fr)}		Tournai	quai Notre-Dame n°10, Tournai	50.609331°N 3.388800°E	57081-CLT-0133-01 Info	Gebouwen: gevels, bekleding en daken
Buildings, facades, cladding and roofing ^{(nl)} ^{(fr)}		Tournai	quai Notre-Dame n°11, Tournai	50.609265°N 3.388873°E	57081-CLT-0134-01 Info	Gebouwen: gevels, bekleding en daken
Building: facades, cladding and roofing ^{(nl)} ^{(fr)}		Tournai	quai Notre-Dame n°12/13, Tournai	50.609245°N 3.388951°E	57081-CLT-0135-01 Info	Gebouw: gevels, bekleding en daken
Buildings, facades, cladding and roofing ^{(nl)} ^{(fr)}		Tournai	quai Notre-Dame n° 19/19b, Tournai	50.609036°N 3.389319°E	57081-CLT-0136-01 Info	Gebouwen: gevels, bekleding en daken
Buildings, facades, cladding and roofing ^{(nl)} ^{(fr)}		Tournai	quai Notre-Dame n°20, Tournai	50.608956°N 3.389477°E	57081-CLT-0137-01 Info	Gebouwen: gevels, bekleding en daken
Building: facades, cladding and roofing ^{(nl)} ^{(fr)}		Tournai	quai Notre-Dame n°21, Tournai	50.608902°N 3.389549°E	57081-CLT-0138-01 Info	Gebouw: gevels, bekleding en daken
Building: facades, cladding and roofing ^{(nl)} ^{(fr)}		Tournai	quai Notre-Dame n°22, Tournai	50.608872°N 3.389617°E	57081-CLT-0139-01 Info	Gebouw: gevels, bekleding en daken
Building: facades, cladding and roofing ^{(nl)} ^{(fr)}		Tournai	quai Notre-Dame n°23, Tournai	50.608848°N 3.389671°E	57081-CLT-0140-01 Info	Gebouw: gevels, bekleding en daken
Building: facades, cladding and roofing ^{(nl)} ^{(fr)}		Tournai	quai Notre-Dame n°24, Tournai	50.608815°N 3.389738°E	57081-CLT-0141-01 Info	Gebouw: gevels, bekleding en daken
Building: facades, cladding and roofing ^{(nl)} ^{(fr)}		Tournai	quai Notre-Dame n°8, Tournai	50.609411°N 3.388654°E	57081-CLT-0142-01 Info	Gebouw: gevels, bekleding en daken
Building: facades, cladding and roofing ^{(nl)} ^{(fr)}		Tournai	quai Notre-Dame n°29, Tournai	50.608606°N 3.390141°E	57081-CLT-0143-01 Info	Gebouw: gevels, bekleding en daken
Building: facades, cladding and roofing ^{(nl)} ^{(fr)}		Tournai	quai Notre-Dame n°31, Tournai	50.608490°N 3.390294°E	57081-CLT-0144-01 Info	Gebouw: gevels, bekleding en daken
Building: facades, cladding and roofing ^{(nl)} ^{(fr)}		Tournai	quai Notre-Dame n°33, Tournai	50.608450°N 3.390337°E	57081-CLT-0145-01 Info	Gebouw: gevels, bekleding en daken
Building: facades, cladding and roofing ^{(nl)} ^{(fr)}		Tournai	quai Notre-Dame n°s 34/35, Tournai	50.608415°N 3.390390°E	57081-CLT-0146-01 Info	Gebouw: gevels, bekleding en daken
Building: facades, cladding and roofing ^{(nl)} ^{(fr)}		Tournai	quai Notre-Dame n°s 36/37, Tournai	50.608361°N 3.390462°E	57081-CLT-0147-01 Info	Gebouw: gevels, bekleding en daken
Building: facades, cladding and roofing ^{(nl)} ^{(fr)}		Tournai	quai Notre-Dame n° 38, Tournai	50.608313°N 3.390552°E	57081-CLT-0148-01 Info	Gebouw: gevels, bekleding en daken
Building: facades, cladding and roofing ^{(nl)} ^{(fr)}		Tournai	quai Vifquin n°12, Tournai	50.606550°N 3.394391°E	57081-CLT-0149-01 Info	Gebouw: gevels, bekleding en daken
Building: facades, cladding and roofing ^{(nl)} ^{(fr)}		Tournai	quai Marché-aux-Poissons n°8A/8B, Tournai	50.607708°N 3.391282°E	57081-CLT-0150-01 Info	Gebouw: gevels, bekleding en daken
Building: facades, cladding and roofing ^{(nl)} ^{(fr)}		Tournai	Quai Marché-aux-Poissons, n°18	50.607184°N 3.391786°E	57081-CLT-0151-01 Info	Gebouw: gevels, bekleding en daken
Building: facades, cladding and roofing ^{(nl)} ^{(fr)}		Tournai	Marché-aux-Poissons n°22	50.606961°N 3.391981°E	57081-CLT-0152-01 Info	Gebouw: gevels, bekleding en daken
Building: facades, cladding and roofing ^{(nl)} ^{(fr)}		Tournai	quai Marché-aux-Poissons n° 23	50.606930°N 3.392032°E	57081-CLT-0153-01 Info	Gebouw: gevels, bekleding en daken
Building: facades, cladding and roofing ^{(nl)} ^{(fr)}		Tournai	quai Staline n°6, tegenwoordig quai Sakharov n°6	50.611025°N 3.387450°E	57081-CLT-0154-01 Info	Gebouw: gevels, bekleding en daken
Building: facades, cladding and roofing ^{(nl)} ^{(fr)}		Tournai	quai des Poissonsceaux n°2 en op de hoek van rue des Carliers, n°2	50.606103°N 3.393498°E	57081-CLT-0155-01 Info	Gebouw: gevels, bekleding en daken
Building: facades, cladding and roofing ^{(nl)} ^{(fr)}		Tournai	quai des Poissonsceaux n°8	50.606024°N 3.393727°E	57081-CLT-0156-01 Info	Gebouw: gevels, bekleding en daken
Building: facades, cladding and roofing ^{(nl)} ^{(fr)}		Tournai	quai des Poissonsceaux n°s 24-2	50.605209°N 3.395493°E	57081-CLT-0157-01 Info	Gebouw: gevels, bekleding en daken
Building: facades, cladding and roofing ^{(nl)} ^{(fr)}		Tournai	rue des Puits-l'Eau n°11, op de hoek van rue de la Triperie	50.606422°N 3.392313°E	57081-CLT-0158-01 Info	Gebouw: gevels, bekleding en daken
Building: facades, cladding and roofing ^{(nl)} ^{(fr)}		Tournai	quai des Salines n°12	50.610403°N 3.386176°E	57081-CLT-0159-01 Info	Gebouw: gevels, bekleding en daken
Building: facades, cladding and roofing ^{(nl)} ^{(fr)}		Tournai	quai des Salines n°14	50.610467°N 3.386011°E	57081-CLT-0160-01 Info	Gebouw: gevels, bekleding en daken
Building: facades, cladding and roofing ^{(nl)} ^{(fr)}		Tournai	quai Taille-Pierres n°1	50.605081°N 3.395744°E	57081-CLT-0161-01 Info	Gebouw: gevels, bekleding en daken
Building: facades, cladding and roofing ^{(nl)} ^{(fr)}		Tournai	quai Taille-Pierres n°3a-3b	50.604924°N 3.396009°E	57081-CLT-0162-01 Info	Gebouw: gevels, bekleding en daken
Building: facades, cladding and roofing ^{(nl)} ^{(fr)}		Tournai	quai Dumon n°1	50.609774°N 3.389871°E	57081-CLT-0163-01 Info	Gebouw: gevels, bekleding en daken
Building: facades, cladding and roofing ^{(nl)} ^{(fr)}		Tournai	quai Dumon n°2	50.609898°N 3.389596°E	57081-CLT-0164-01 Info	Gebouw: gevels, bekleding en daken
Building: facades, cladding and roofing ^{(nl)} ^{(fr)}		Tournai	quai Vifquin n°19	50.606284°N 3.394765°E	57081-CLT-0165-01 Info	Gebouw: gevels, bekleding en daken
Building: facades, cladding and roofing ^{(nl)} ^{(fr)}		Tournai	quai Vifquin n°26	50.605890°N 3.395536°E	57081-CLT-0166-01 Info	Gebouw: gevels, bekleding en daken
Building: facades, cladding and roofing ^{(nl)} ^{(fr)}		Tournai	quai Vifquin n°30	50.605730°N 3.395824°E	57081-CLT-0167-01 Info	Gebouw: gevels, bekleding en daken
Building: facades, cladding and roofing ^{(nl)} ^{(fr)}		Tournai	quai Notre-Dame n°39 en rue de l'hôpital Notre-Dame n°s 1-3-5-7	50.608223°N 3.390560°E	57081-CLT-0168-01 Info	Gebouw: gevels, bekleding en daken
Building: facades, cladding and roofing ^{(nl)} ^{(fr)}		Tournai	rue de la Triperie n°11	50.606543°N 3.392166°E	57081-CLT-0169-01 Info	Gebouw: gevels, bekleding en daken
Building: facades, cladding and roofing ^{(nl)} ^{(fr)}		Tournai	rue de la Triperie n°s 13-15	50.606496°N 3.392250°E	57081-CLT-0170-01 Info	Gebouw: gevels, bekleding en daken
Building: facades, cladding and roofing ^{(nl)} ^{(fr)}		Tournai	quai Notre-Dame n°26	50.608700°N 3.389963°E	57081-CLT-0171-01 Info	Gebouw: gevels, bekleding en daken
Building: facades, cladding and roofing ^{(nl)} ^{(fr)}		Tournai	quai Notre-Dame n°27	50.608672°N 3.390033°E	57081-CLT-0172-01 Info	Gebouw: gevels, bekleding en daken
Building: facades, cladding and roofing ^{(nl)} ^{(fr)}		Tournai	quai Notre-Dame n°30b	50.608530°N 3.390230°E	57081-CLT-0173-01 Info	Gebouw: gevels, bekleding en daken
Building: facades, cladding and roofing ^{(nl)} ^{(fr)}		Tournai	quai des Salines n°19	50.610775°N 3.385575°E	57081-CLT-0174-01 Info	Gebouw: gevels, bekleding en daken
Building: facades, cladding and roofing ^{(nl)} ^{(fr)}		Tournai	quai des Salines n°26	50.611180°N 3.385036°E	57081-CLT-0175-01 Info	Gebouw: gevels, bekleding en daken
Building: facades, cladding and roofing ^{(nl)} ^{(fr)}		Tournai	quai des Salines n°27	50.611266°N 3.384917°E	57081-CLT-0176-01 Info	Gebouw: gevels, bekleding en daken
Building: facades, cladding and roofing ^{(nl)} ^{(fr)}		Tournai	quai des Salines n°28	50.611422°N 3.384714°E	57081-CLT-0177-01 Info	Gebouw: gevels, bekleding en daken
Building: facades, cladding and roofing ^{(nl)} ^{(fr)}		Tournai	quai des Salines n°s 30-30a	50.611775°N 3.384234°E	57081-CLT-0178-01 Info	Gebouw: gevels, bekleding en daken
Building: facades, cladding and roofing ^{(nl)} ^{(fr)}		Tournai	rue de Glategnies, n°27	50.606690°N 3.397739°E	57081-CLT-0179-01 Info	Gebouw: gevels, bekleding en daken
Building: facades, cladding and roofing ^{(nl)} ^{(fr)}		Tournai	rue de Glategnies n°29	50.606730°N 3.397678°E	57081-CLT-0180-01 Info	Gebouw: gevels, bekleding en daken
Building: facades, cladding and roofing ^{(nl)} ^{(fr)}		Tournai	quai Notre-Dame n°28	50.608652°N 3.390082°E	57081-CLT-0181-01 Info	Gebouw: gevels, bekleding en daken
Building: facades, cladding and roofing ^{(nl)} ^{(fr)}		Tournai	quai Taille-Pierres n°19	50.603547°N 3.397204°E	57081-CLT-0183-01 Info	Gebouw: gevels, bekleding en daken
Building: facades, cladding and roofing ^{(nl)} ^{(fr)}		Tournai	quai Taille-Pierres n°17	50.603605°N 3.397136°E	57081-CLT-0184-01 Info	Gebouw: gevels, bekleding en daken
Building: facades, cladding and roofing ^{(nl)} ^{(fr)}		Tournai	quai Taille-Pierres n°s 11-12	50.604253°N 3.396600°E	57081-CLT-0185-01 Info	
Building: facades, cladding and roofing ^{(nl)} ^{(fr)}		Tournai	quai Taille-Pierres n°15	50.603718°N 3.397011°E	57081-CLT-0186-01 Info	Gebouw: gevels, bekleding en daken
Building: facades, cladding and roofing ^{(nl)} ^{(fr)}		Tournai	quai Taille-Pierres n°18	50.603572°N 3.397182°E	57081-CLT-0187-01 Info	Gebouw: gevels, bekleding en daken
Ensemble of various buildings ^{(nl)} ^{(fr)}		Tournai	rue d'En-Bas	50.595196°N 3.406580°E	57081-CLT-0188-01 Info	
Expanding the site of several buildings ^{(nl)} ^{(fr)}		Tournai	rue d'En-Bas	50.595742°N 3.406401°E	57081-CLT-0189-01 Info	
Facades and roofs of the building ^{(nl)} ^{(fr)}		Tournai	rue des Jésuites n°19	50.604366°N 3.391577°E	57081-CLT-0190-01 Info	Gevels en daken van het gebouw
Facade and roof of the house ^{(nl)} ^{(fr)}		Tournai	rue Saint-Martin n°30	50.604380°N 3.386876°E	57081-CLT-0191-01 Info	Voorgevel en dak van het huis
Frontage and the totality of the roof of the building ^{(nl)} ^{(fr)}		Tournai	rue de la Tête d'Or n°3	50.605887°N 3.390842°E	57081-CLT-0193-01 Info	Voorgevel en de totaliteit van het dak van het gebouw
Facades, cladding and roofs of the building ^{(nl)} ^{(fr)}		Tournai	quai Taille-Pierres n°9	50.604382°N 3.396545°E	57081-CLT-0195-01 Info	
Facades, cladding and roofs of the building ^{(nl)} ^{(fr)}		Tournai	quai Taille-Pierres n°22	50.603356°N 3.397367°E	57081-CLT-0196-01 Info	Gevels, bekleding en daken van het gebouw
Facades and roofs of the building and the wall right of the gate ^{(nl)} ^{(fr)}		Tournai	rue des Récollets n°40	50.602714°N 3.397127°E	57081-CLT-0197-01 Info	Gevels en daken van het gebouw en de muur rechts van de poort
Facades, cladding and roofs of the building ^{(nl)} ^{(fr)}		Tournai	quai Vifquin n°18	50.606308°N 3.394707°E	57081-CLT-0198-01 Info	Gevels, bekleding en daken van het gebouw
Major Seminary ^{(nl)} ^{(fr)}		Tournai	rue des Jésuites, n°28	50.603670°N 3.391546°E	57081-CLT-0199-01 Info	Grand Séminaire: een voormalig klooster van de Jezuïeten (gevels en daken) en de tuinen More images
House facades, roofs and stairs ^{(nl)} ^{(fr)}		Tournai	rue de l'Écorcherie n°41	50.611887°N 3.382804°E	57081-CLT-0200-01 Info	Huis: gevels, daken en trap
Old hôtel des pompiers: street facade and courtyard facade, behind facade, facade of the left wing, roofs ^{(nl)} ^{(fr)}		Tournai	rue de l'Hôpital Notre-Dame, n°16	50.607508°N 3.390134°E	57081-CLT-0201-01 Info	Oud hôtel des pompiers: straatgevel en gevel aan binnenplaats, achteregevel, gevel van de linker zijvleugel, daken
Church of Saint-Thomas ^{(nl)} ^{(fr)}		Tournai	Maulde	50.617046°N 3.548716°E	57081-CLT-0202-01 Info	Kerk Saint-Thomas
Facades and roofs of the building, today a school, formerly the hospice of Vieillesse ^{(nl)} ^{(fr)}		Tournai	rue Sainte-Catherine n°32	50.602176°N 3.397282°E	57081-CLT-0203-01 Info	Gevels en daken van het gebouw, tegenwoordig school, voormalig hospice van Vieillesse
Facades, cladding and roofs of the building (former Hôtel des Artilleurs) ^{(nl)} ^{(fr)}		Tournai	rue Saint-Martin n°42	50.604108°N 3.386537°E	57081-CLT-0204-01 Info	Gevels, bekleding en daken van het gebouw (voormalig hôtel des artilleurs)
Facades, cladding and roofs of the building ^{(nl)} ^{(fr)}		Tournai	rue Saint-Martin n°44	50.604046°N 3.386470°E	57081-CLT-0205-01 Info	
Expansion of the classification: the stairs of the house ^{(nl)} ^{(fr)}		Tournai	rue Saint-Martin n°44	50.604017°N 3.386526°E	57081-CLT-0206-01 Info	Uitbreiding van de classificatue met de trap van het huis
Facades, cladding and roofs of the building ^{(nl)} ^{(fr)}		Tournai	rue Saint-Martin n°46	50.603970°N 3.386390°E	57081-CLT-0207-01 Info	Gevels, bekleding en daken van het gebouw
Facades, cladding and roofs of the building ^{(nl)} ^{(fr)}		Tournai	rue Saint-Martin n°48	50.603885°N 3.386280°E	57081-CLT-0208-01 Info	Gevels, bekleding en daken van het gebouw
Facade with monumental portal, courtyard facades, facade on garden side, and all trim and roofs of the building ^{(nl)} ^{(fr)}		Tournai	rue Saint-Jacques n°41	50.609821°N 3.383592°E	57081-CLT-0209-01 Info	Gevel met monumentaal portaal, gevels aan binnenplaats, gevel aan tuinzijde, en alle bekleding en daken van het gebouw
Facades, cladding and roofs of the building ^{(nl)} ^{(fr)}		Tournai	rue Saint-Martin n°54	50.603641°N 3.386013°E	57081-CLT-0210-01 Info	Gevels, bekleding en daken van het gebouw
Facades, cladding and roofs of the building ^{(nl)} ^{(fr)}		Tournai	rue Saint-Martin n°56	50.603563°N 3.385930°E	57081-CLT-0211-01 Info	Gevels, bekleding en daken van het gebouw
Facades, cladding and roofs of the building ^{(nl)} ^{(fr)}		Tournai	rue Saint-Martin n°58	50.603485°N 3.385834°E	57081-CLT-0212-01 Info	Gevels, bekleding en daken van het gebouw
Facades, cladding and roofs of the building ^{(nl)} ^{(fr)}		Tournai	rue Saint-Martin n°60	50.603383°N 3.385721°E	57081-CLT-0213-01 Info	Gevels, bekleding en daken van het gebouw
Facades, cladding and roofs of the building ^{(nl)} ^{(fr)}		Tournai	rue Saint-Martin n°50	50.603780°N 3.386174°E	57081-CLT-0214-01 Info	Gevels, bekleding en daken van het gebouw
House facades, roofs, stairs and garden ^{(nl)} ^{(fr)}		Tournai	rue des Croisiers n°1	50.605362°N 3.399683°E	57081-CLT-0218-01 Info	Huis: gevels, daken, trap en de tuin
House facades and roofs, excluding porch ^{(nl)} ^{(fr)}		Tournai	rue Roc-Saint-Nicaise n°35	50.604975°N 3.384285°E	57081-CLT-0219-01 Info	Huis: gevels en daken, uitgezonderd de veranda
Bridge of Trou and a portion of the adjacent quays, and the ensemble of the bridge and surroundings ^{(nl)} ^{(fr)}		Tournai		50.612813°N 3.383503°E	57081-CLT-0220-01 Info	Brug van Trou en een deel van de aangrenzende kades, en het ensemble van de brug en omgeving More images
Facades, cladding and roofs of the building ^{(nl)} ^{(fr)}		Tournai	rue des Chapeliers n°1, op de hoek van rue de la Cordonnerie	50.606327°N 3.390412°E	57081-CLT-0221-01 Info	Gevels, bekleding en daken van het gebouw
House: walls and roofs ^{(nl)} ^{(fr)}		Tournai	rue Saints-Jacques n°9	50.609197°N 3.385257°E	57081-CLT-0223-01 Info	Huis: gevels en daken
House: walls and roofs ^{(nl)} ^{(fr)}		Tournai	rue de la Cordonnerie n°2	50.606776°N 3.389953°E	57081-CLT-0224-01 Info	Huis: gevels en daken
Tower of the castle ^{(nl)} ^{(fr)}		Tournai	Maulde, rue des Carondelet	50.614139°N 3.561673°E	57081-CLT-0225-01 Info	Toren van het kasteel
House facade and roof ^{(nl)} ^{(fr)}		Tournai	rue des Augustins n°s 27-29	50.609203°N 3.380515°E	57081-CLT-0226-01 Info	Huis: voorgevel en dak
House: walls and roofs ^{(nl)} ^{(fr)}		Tournai	rue des Récollets n°s 20-22	50.603221°N 3.396392°E	57081-CLT-0230-01 Info	Huis: gevels en daken
Brasserie Saint-Yves or Brasserie Carbonnelle: facades, roofs and portico of the main building ^{(nl)} ^{(fr)}		Tournai	rue de la Madeleine n°18	50.610602°N 3.382105°E	57081-CLT-0231-01 Info	Brasserie Saint-Yves of Brasserie Carbonnelle: gevels, daken en portiek van het hoofdgebouw
Hôtel Crombez: facades, roofs, porch and yard ^{(nl)} ^{(fr)}		Tournai	rue Saint-Piat n° 3	50.604543°N 3.393066°E	57081-CLT-0232-01 Info	Hôtel Crombez: gevels, daken, portiek en binnenplaats
Building: walls, roofs, banisters, two stones with the heraldic shields ^{(nl)} ^{(fr)}		Tournai	rue du Bourdon Saint-Jacques n°16	50.608874°N 3.385820°E	57081-CLT-0234-01 Info	Gebouw: gevels, daken, trapleuning, twee stenen met het wapens
building: façade and roofs ^{(nl)} ^{(fr)}		Tournai	rue Roc Saint-Nicaise n° 15	50.605452°N 3.383740°E	57081-CLT-0235-01 Info	gebouw: straatgevel en daken
Building: facades, cladding, roof and room left, and building: walls, trim, roof, hall, stairs and salon right ^{(nl)} ^{(fr)}		Tournai	rue Saint-Brice, n°51 en 53	50.607263°N 3.398361°E	57081-CLT-0237-01 Info	Gebouw: gevels, bekleding, dak en kamer links, en gebouw: gevels, bekleding, dak, hal, trap en salon rechts
Convent of the Poor Clares, a former "Clos des Récollets": facades, roofs and cladding of the wing of the building and the sidewalk along the facade to the quays and the creation of a protection zone ^{(nl)} ^{(fr)}		Tournai	quai Taille-Pierres n°s 27-27b	50.602204°N 3.398651°E	57081-CLT-0238-01 Info	Klooster van de Clarissen, voormalig "Clos des Récollets": gevels, daken en bekleding van de vleugel van het gebouw, en het trottoir langs de gevel naar de kaden en oprichting van een beschermingszone
Place Saint-Pierre ^{(nl)} ^{(fr)}		Tournai		50.607029°N 3.390351°E	57081-CLT-0239-01 Info	Place Saint-Pierre
Atheneum: street facade, cladding and roof of the gallery with arcades and facades, cladding and roofs of buildings from the 17th century adjacent to the courtyard of the Atheneum. Revocation of decree of 21 November 1983 as a monument on the street facade, cladding and roofs of buildings from the 17th century adjacent to the courtyard ^{(nl)} ^{(fr)}		Tournai	rue Duquesnoy	50.609146°N 3.396578°E	57081-CLT-0257-01 Info	Koninklijk Atheneum: straatgevel, bekleding en daken van de galerie met arcaden, en gevels, bekleding en daken van de gebouwen uit de 17e eeuw grenzend aan de binnenplaats van het Atheneum. Intrekking van uitvoeringsbesluit van 21 november 1983 als een monument aan de straatgevel, bekleding en daken van de gebouwen uit de 17e eeuw grenzend aan de binnenplaats
Building: facades, cladding and roofing ^{(nl)} ^{(fr)}		Tournai	quai Marché-aux-Poissons n°11, Tournai	50.607486°N 3.391454°E	57081-CLT-0260-01 Info	Gebouw: gevels, bekleding en daken
Building: facades, cladding and roofing ^{(nl)} ^{(fr)}		Tournai	quai Marché-aux-Poissons n°12, Tournai	50.607431°N 3.391490°E	57081-CLT-0261-01 Info	Gebouw: gevels, bekleding en daken
Building: facades, cladding and roofing ^{(nl)} ^{(fr)}		Tournai	quai Marché-aux-Poissons n°13, Tournai	50.607391°N 3.391539°E	57081-CLT-0262-01 Info	Gebouw: gevels, bekleding en daken
Building: facades, cladding and roofing ^{(nl)} ^{(fr)}		Tournai	quai Marché-aux-Poissons n°13 Bis, Tournai	50.607358°N 3.391577°E	57081-CLT-0263-01 Info	Gebouw: gevels, bekleding en daken
Building: facades, cladding and roofing ^{(nl)} ^{(fr)}		Tournai	quai Marché-aux-Poissons n°14, Tournai	50.607328°N 3.391614°E	57081-CLT-0264-01 Info	Gebouw: gevels, bekleding en daken
Building: facades, cladding and roofing ^{(nl)} ^{(fr)}		Tournai	quai Marché-aux-Poissons n°15, Tournai	50.607292°N 3.391664°E	57081-CLT-0265-01 Info	Gebouw: gevels, bekleding en daken
Building: facades, cladding and roofing ^{(nl)} ^{(fr)}		Tournai	quai Marché-aux-Poissons n°16, Tournai	50.607252°N 3.391698°E	57081-CLT-0266-01 Info	Gebouw: gevels, bekleding en daken
Building: facades, cladding and roofing ^{(nl)} ^{(fr)}		Tournai	quai Marché-aux-Poissons n°17, Tournai	50.607221°N 3.391734°E	57081-CLT-0267-01 Info	Gebouw: gevels, bekleding en daken
Jardin d'hiver (conservatory): interior, doors and roofs ^{(nl)} ^{(fr)}		Tournai	place Crombez n°20	50.611420°N 3.396835°E	57081-CLT-0268-01 Info	
Maison de fondations ^{(nl)} ^{(fr)}		Tournai	rue de Marvis n°31, Tournai	50.607155°N 3.400142°E	57081-CLT-0269-01 Info	Maison de fondations
Maison de fondations ^{(nl)} ^{(fr)}		Tournai	rue de Marvis n°33, Tournai	50.607154°N 3.400232°E	57081-CLT-0270-01 Info	Maison de fondations
Maison de fondations ^{(nl)} ^{(fr)}		Tournai	rue de Marvis n°43, Tournai	50.607109°N 3.401351°E	57081-CLT-0271-01 Info	Maison de fondations
Maison de fondations ^{(nl)} ^{(fr)}		Tournai	rue de Marvis n°45, Tournai	50.607100°N 3.401426°E	57081-CLT-0272-01 Info	Maison de fondations
Maison de fondations ^{(nl)} ^{(fr)}		Tournai	rue de Marvis n°47, Tournai	50.607082°N 3.401507°E	57081-CLT-0273-01 Info	Maison de fondations
Maison de fondations ^{(nl)} ^{(fr)}		Tournai	rue de Marvis n°49, Tournai	50.607077°N 3.401598°E	57081-CLT-0274-01 Info	Maison de fondations
Maison de fondations ^{(nl)} ^{(fr)}		Tournai	rue de Marvis n°51, Tournai	50.607060°N 3.401689°E	57081-CLT-0275-01 Info	Maison de fondations
Maison de fondations ^{(nl)} ^{(fr)}		Tournai	rue de Marvis n°53, Tournai	50.606955°N 3.401913°E	57081-CLT-0276-01 Info	Maison de fondations
Maison de fondations ^{(nl)} ^{(fr)}		Tournai	rue de Marvis n°57, Tournai	50.606899°N 3.401993°E	57081-CLT-0277-01 Info	Maison de fondations
Maison de fondations ^{(nl)} ^{(fr)}		Tournai	rue de Marvis n°59, Tournai	50.606854°N 3.402062°E	57081-CLT-0278-01 Info	Maison de fondations
Maison de fondations ^{(nl)} ^{(fr)}		Tournai	rue de Marvis n°61, Tournai	50.606775°N 3.402140°E	57081-CLT-0279-01 Info	Maison de fondations
Maison de fondations ^{(nl)} ^{(fr)}		Tournai	rue de Marvis n°63, Tournai	50.606721°N 3.402226°E	57081-CLT-0280-01 Info	Maison de fondations
Maison de fondations ^{(nl)} ^{(fr)}		Tournai	rue de Marvis n°65, Tournai	50.606674°N 3.402291°E	57081-CLT-0281-01 Info	Maison de fondations
Maison de fondations ^{(nl)} ^{(fr)}		Tournai	rue de Marvis n°67, Tournai	50.606637°N 3.402349°E	57081-CLT-0282-01 Info	Maison de fondations
Maison de fondations ^{(nl)} ^{(fr)}		Tournai	rue de Marvis n°69, Tournai	50.606602°N 3.402429°E	57081-CLT-0283-01 Info	Maison de fondations
Maison de fondations ^{(nl)} ^{(fr)}		Tournai	rue de Marvis n°71, Tournai	50.606551°N 3.402501°E	57081-CLT-0284-01 Info	Maison de fondations
Building: walls and roofs ^{(nl)} ^{(fr)}		Tournai	rue des Soeurs Noires n°33, Tournai	50.609474°N 3.382605°E	57081-CLT-0285-01 Info	Gebouw: gevels en daken
Building: walls and roofs ^{(nl)} ^{(fr)}		Tournai	rue des Soeurs Noires n°35, Tournai	50.609496°N 3.382552°E	57081-CLT-0286-01 Info	Gebouw: gevels en daken
Building: walls and roofs ^{(nl)} ^{(fr)}		Tournai	rue des Soeurs Noires n°37, Tournai	50.609518°N 3.382501°E	57081-CLT-0287-01 Info	Gebouw: gevels en daken
Building: walls and roofs ^{(nl)} ^{(fr)}		Tournai	rue Saint-Jacques n°24	50.609852°N 3.382791°E	57081-CLT-0288-01 Info	Gebouw: gevels en daken
House: walls and roofs ^{(nl)} ^{(fr)}		Tournai	place de Lille n°17, Tournai	50.606439°N 3.380931°E	57081-CLT-0289-01 Info	Huis: gevels en daken
Building: front and left side ^{(nl)} ^{(fr)}		Tournai	rue de la Madeleine n°20	50.610602°N 3.382105°E	57081-CLT-0290-01 Info	Gebouw: voorgevel en linker zijgevel
Building: façade and roofs ^{(nl)} ^{(fr)}		Tournai	rue Roc Saint Nicaise n°17	50.605405°N 3.383795°E	57081-CLT-0291-01 Info	Gebouw: straatgevel en daken
Building: façade and gabled roofs ^{(nl)} ^{(fr)}		Tournai	rue Roc Saint Nicaise n°19	50.605362°N 3.383846°E	57081-CLT-0292-01 Info	Gebouw: straatgevel en daken met puntgevel
Ensemble of the Notre Dame Cathedral with the exception of the organ in the choir (instrumental part and buffet) ^{(nl)} ^{(fr)}		Tournai		50.606520°N 3.388884°E	57081-PEX-0001-01 Info	Ensemble van de Onze-Lieve-Vrouwekathedraal, met uitzondering van het orgel in het koor (instrumentaal deel en buffet)
Ensemble of the church Saint-Jacques, excluding the instrumental part of the organ ^{(nl)} ^{(fr)}		Tournai		50.608885°N 3.384661°E	57081-PEX-0002-01 Info	Ensemble van de kerk Saint-Jacques, uitgezonderd het instrumentaal deel van het orgel
Belfry of Tournai ^{(nl)} ^{(fr)}		Tournai		50.605757°N 3.388031°E	57081-PEX-0003-01 Info	Belfort van Doornik
Tower called "Tour Henry VIII" ^{(nl)} ^{(fr)}		Tournai		50.612327°N 3.392075°E	57081-PEX-0004-01 Info	Toren genaamd "Tour Henri VIII"
House facade and roof ^{(nl)} ^{(fr)}		Tournai	rue des Jésuites n°14	50.604255°N 3.391714°E	57081-PEX-0005-01 Info	Huis: voorgevel en daken
House facade and roof ^{(nl)} ^{(fr)}		Tournai	rue des Jésuites, n°12	50.604293°N 3.391757°E	57081-PEX-0006-01 Info	Huis: voorgevel en daken
House facade and roof ^{(nl)} ^{(fr)}		Tournai	rue des Jésuites n°s 14 b-16	50.604180°N 3.391666°E	57081-PEX-0007-01 Info	Huis: voorgevel en daken
Museum of fine arts, l'Enclos Saint-Martin ^{(nl)} ^{(fr)}		Tournai		50.602547°N 3.385462°E	57081-PEX-0008-01 Info	

== See also ==
- List of protected heritage sites in Hainaut (province)
- Tournai
