= Jean-Baptiste Thorn =

Luxembourg-born jurist and politician

- Born: 17 March 1783; Remich
- Died: 23 March 1841 (aged 58); Mons
- Occupations: politician, judge

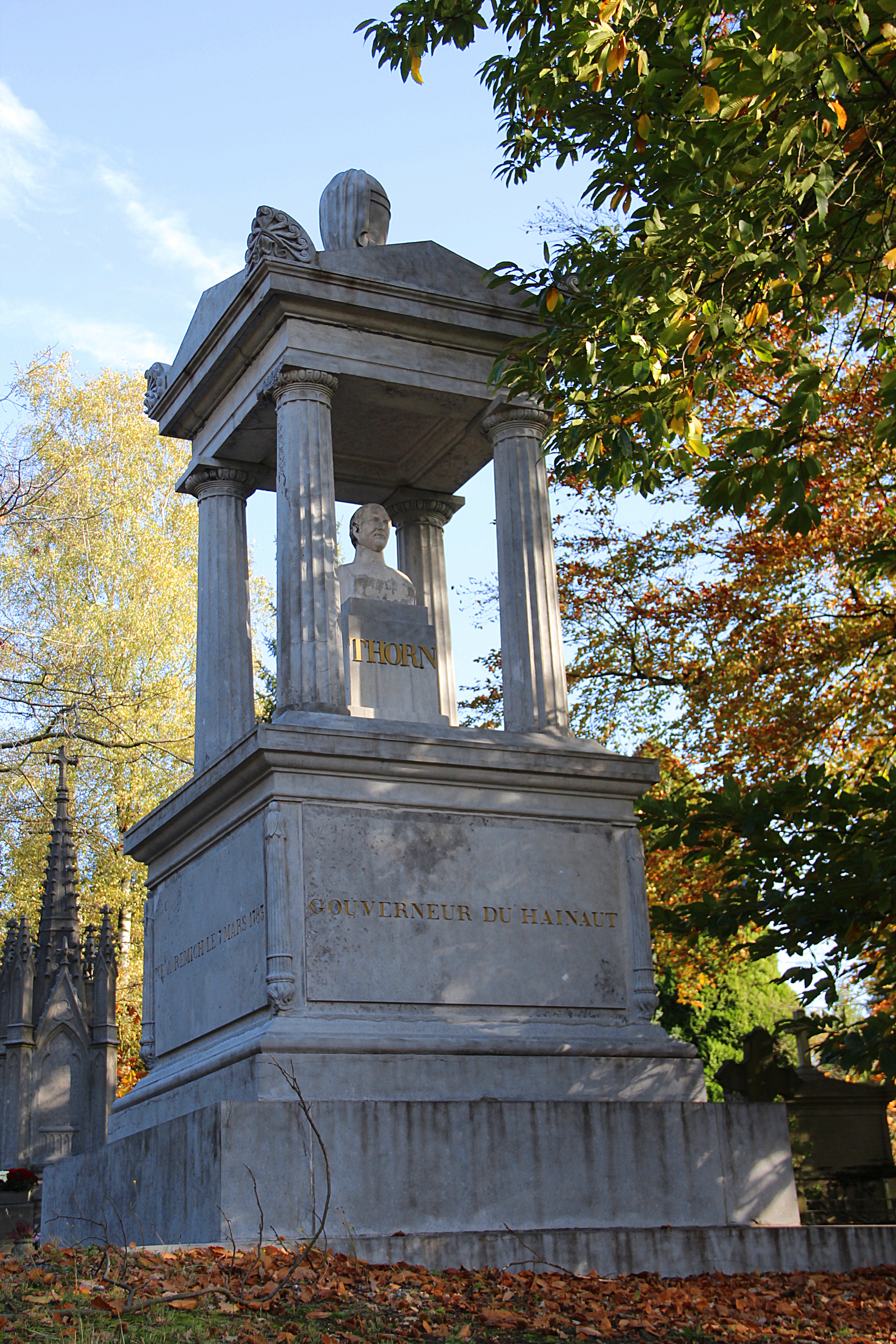

Jean-Baptiste Thorn (17 March 1783 – 23 March 1841) was a Luxembourg-born jurist and politician that held office in both Luxembourg and Belgium during and immediately after the Belgian Revolution.

He was a member of the National Congress of Belgium (1830–1831), the revolutionary body responsible for drafting the new Belgian constitution, and served as governor of the Belgian provinces of Luxembourg (1830–1836) and Hainaut (1836–1841).

After the Revolution, Thorn returned to the (partitioned) Grand Duchy of Luxembourg, where he became a councillor on the communal council of Luxembourg City.

Political offices
New title Belgium declared independence	Governor of Luxembourg; 1830–1836	Succeeded by Victorin de Steenhault
Preceded by	Governor of Hainaut; 1836–1841	Succeeded by Charles Liedts
