= Louis de Brouchoven de Bergeyck =

Belgian politician

- Born: Louis Charles Joseph Marie de Brouchoven de Bergeyck; 14 May 1871; Antwerp, Belgium
- Died: 20 December 1938 (aged 67); Antwerp, Belgium
- Occupation: politician

Count Louis Charles Joseph Marie de Brouchoven de Bergeyck (14 May 1871 – 20 December 1938) was a Belgian politician. He was governor of the province of Antwerp from 15 November 1907 until 14 March 1908.

== Political career ==
Louis de Brouchoven de Bergeyck was a member of the Belgian Parliament from 1908 until 1912 and a senator in the Belgian Senate from 1918 until 1936.

== Sources ==
- Steve Heylen, Bart De Nil, Bart D’hondt, Sophie Gyselinck, Hanne Van Herck en Donald Weber, Geschiedenis van de provincie Antwerpen. Een politieke biografie, Antwerpen, Provinciebestuur Antwerpen, 2005, Vol. 2 p. 45

Preceded by Fredegand Cogels	Governor of Antwerp; 1907–1908	Succeeded by Ferdinand de Baillet-Latour
