= Charles du Bois de Vroylande =

Belgian lawyer and politician

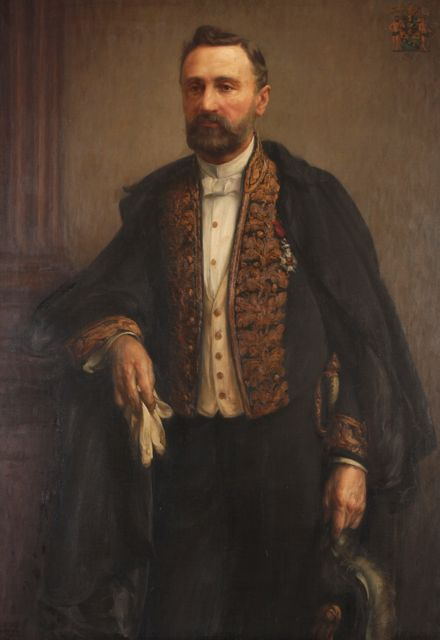
- Born: Charles Louis du Bois de Vroylande; 21 January 1835; Antwerp, Belgium
- Died: 30 December 1888 (aged 53); Antwerp, Belgium
- Occupation: politician

Jonkheer Charles Louis du Bois de Vroylande (21 January 1835 – 30 December 1888) was a Belgian lawyer and politician. He was governor of the province of Antwerp from 24 March 1887 until 30 December 1888.

== Political career ==
Charles du Bois de Vroylande was a member of the Provincial council of Antwerp for the Canton Zandhoven from 3 July 1866 until 23 May 1886, and provincial deputy from 6 July 1876 until 1886. He was a member of the communal council of Halle until 1876 and burgomaster from 1862 until 1876.

== Sources ==
- Steve Heylen, Bart De Nil, Bart D’hondt, Sophie Gyselinck, Hanne Van Herck en Donald Weber, Geschiedenis van de provincie Antwerpen. Een politieke biografie, Antwerpen, Provinciebestuur Antwerpen, 2005, Vol. 2 p. 79

Preceded by Edouard Pycke	Governor of Antwerp; 1887–1888	Succeeded by Edouard Osy de Zegwaart
