= Hilde Houben-Bertrand =

Belgian politician (born 1940)

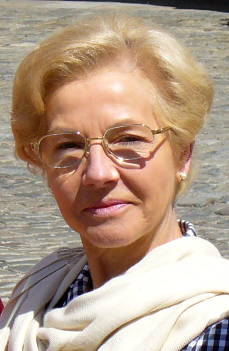
Hilde Houben-Bertrand

Hilde Houben-Bertrand (born Genk, 24 May 1940) is a Belgian politician of the Christian Democratic and Flemish Party (CD&V). She is best known for being a former governor of the Belgian province Limburg.

Preceded by Harry Vandermeulen	Governor of Limburg; 1995 – 2005	Succeeded by Steve Stevaert
