= Herman Reynders =

Herman Reynders (born Hasselt, 1 February 1958) is a Belgian former basketball player and politician of the Vooruit party.

== Basketball ==
Herman Reynders played in the Basketball League Belgium during a period of eight years, the highest Belgian basketball league for, amongst others, Koninklijke Sint-Truidense basketbal. He played over 35 A-interlands with the Belgium national basketball team between 1979 and 1983. He played in EuroBasket 1979, in Turin, Italy, where the Belgian team ended 12th and last.

== Politics ==
In 1989 he became a city council member of the municipality of Hasselt. From 1995 he was also alderman, in charge of financial affairs. He became acting mayor in 1998, when fellow party member Steve Stevaert became a minister in the Flemish government of Dewael. In 2003 Stevaert became party chairman, and Reynders was once again named acting mayor. From June 2004 until February 2006 Reynders also held a seat in the Flemish Parliament. In 2005 he became mayor of Hasselt, which he would remain until 2009. He was succeeded by Hilde Claes.

On 5 October 2009 Reynders succeeded Stevaert as governor of the province of Limburg.

== See also ==
- List of governors of Limburg, Belgium
