= Harry Vandermeulen =

Belgian politician (1928–2022)

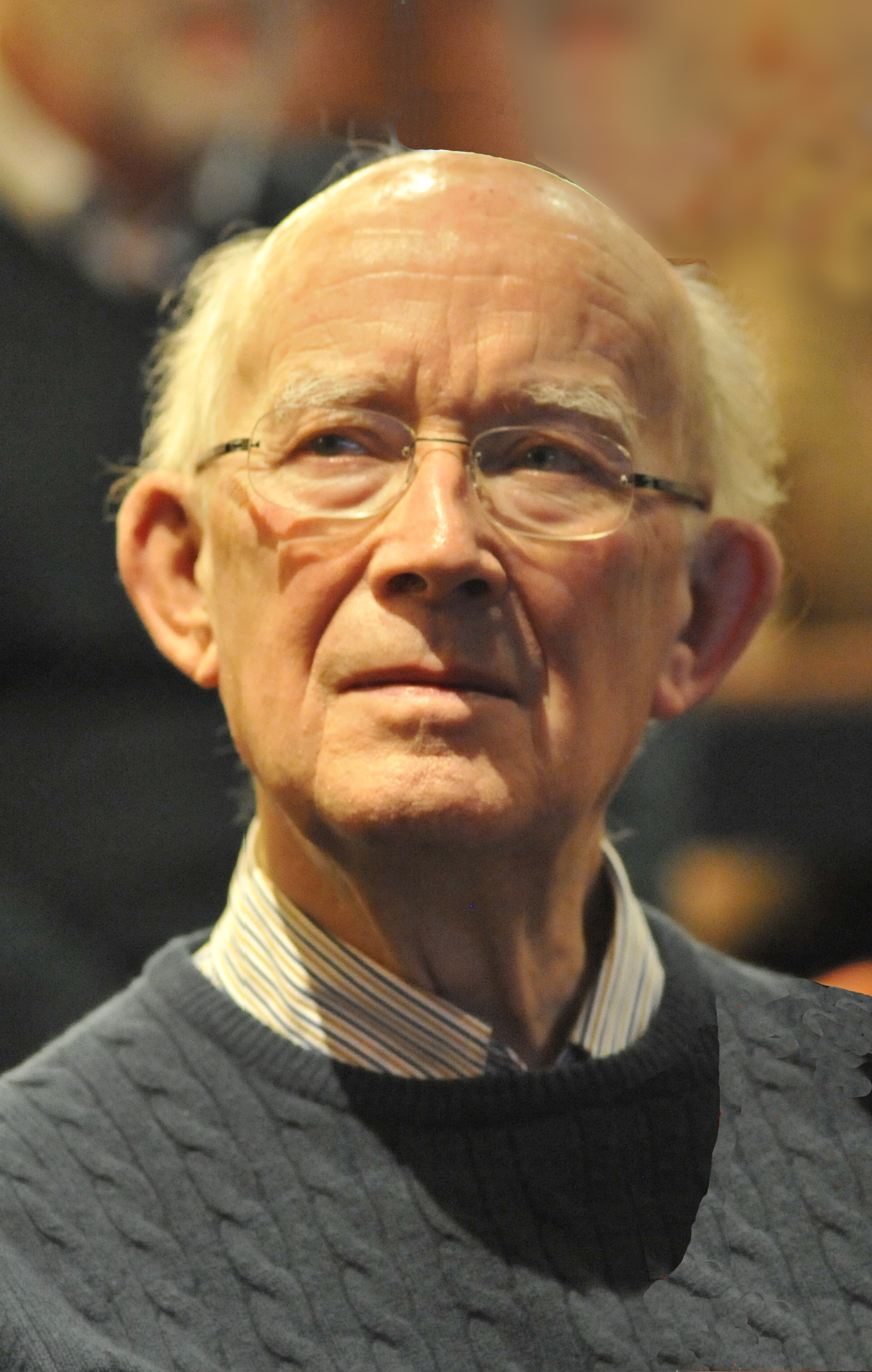
- Vandermeulen in 2015

Governor of Limburg
- In office 1978–1995
- Preceded by: Louis Roppe
- Succeeded by: Hilde Houben-Bertrand

Personal details
- Born: 27 November 1928 Bree, Belgium
- Died: 27 November 2022 (aged 94)
- Party: Christian Social Party; Christian People's Party
- Education: KU Leuven

Harry Vandermeulen (27 November 1928 – 27 November 2022) was a Belgian politician. A member of the Christian People's Party, he served as governor of Limburg from 1978 to 1995.

Vandermeulen died on 27 November 2022, his 94th birthday.
