= Pierre Clerdent =

Belgian politician

Pierre Charles Jean Joseph, Count Clerdent (29 April 1909 – 11 June 2006) was a Belgian politician.

== Career ==
During his career he was governor of Liege and Luxemburg.

== Honours ==
- Created Count Clerdent in 1995 by Royal order of King Albert II.
- Honorary Governor of Liege.
- Grand Cross in the Order of Leopold II.
- Grand Cross in the Order of Merit of the Federal Republic of Germany.
- Grand Officer in the Order of Leopold.
- Grand Officer in the Legion of Honour.
- Grand Officer in the Order of the Oak Crown.
- Grand Officer in the Order of Orange-Nassau
- Grand Officer in the Order of Merit of the Italian Republic
- Grand Officer in the Order of the Phoenix
- Knight Commander of the Royal Victorian Order.
